= Mandatory Palestine =

British mandate territory (1920–1948)

Palestine
- 1920–1948
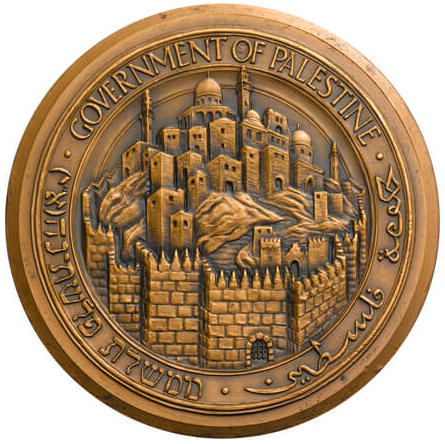
- Flag Public Seal

- Mandatory Palestine in 1946
- Status: Class A League of Nations mandate of the United Kingdom
- Capital: Jerusalem; 31°45′16″N 35°14′12″E
- Common languages: Arabic, English, Hebrew
- Religion (1922): 78% Islam; 11% Judaism; 10% Christianity; 1% other, including Baháʼí Faith, Druze faith
- Demonym: Palestinian
- High Commissioner
  - 1920–1925 (first): Sir Herbert L. Samuel
  - 1945–1948 (last): Sir Alan Cunningham
  - Parliamentary body of the Muslim community: Supreme Muslim Council
  - Parliamentary body of the Jewish community: Assembly of Representatives
- Historical era: Interwar period; Second World War; Cold War
  - Mandate assigned: 25 April 1920
  - Britain officially assumes control: 29 September 1923
  - End of Mandate: 14 May 1948

Area
  - Total: 25,585.3 km^{2} (9,878.5 sq mi)

Population
  - Census: 757,182 (1922)
- Currency: Egyptian pound (until 1927); Palestine pound (from 1927)
Preceded by
Occupied Enemy Territory Administration
Succeeded by
Israel
Jordanian annexation of the West Bank
All-Palestine Protectorate
- Today part of: Israel; Palestine

Mandatory Palestine, officially known as Palestine, (Note: During its existence, and in most sources referring to this era, the territory was referred to as Palestine, but, a variety of other names and descriptors have been used occasionally, including Mandatory or Mandate Palestine, the British Mandate of Palestine and British Palestine (Arabic: فلسطين الانتدابية Filasṭīn al-Intidābiyah; Hebrew: פָּלֶשְׂתִּינָה (א״י), romanized: Pāleśtīnā (E.Y.), where "E.Y." indicates ’Eretz Yiśrā’ēl, the Land of Israel).) was a British administrative territory in the region of Palestine between 1920 and 1948. Under the League of Nations mandate system, Britain was entrusted with administrating Palestine on the development of representative institutions and eventual self-government. From 1922, Britain administered the territory under the Mandate for Palestine with the British High Commissioner under the Colonial Office as its chief administrator.

After the Arab Revolt against the Ottoman Empire during the First World War in 1916, British forces drove Ottoman forces out of the Levant between 1917 and 1918. For the British, the United Kingdom had agreed in the McMahon–Hussein Correspondence that it would honour Arab independence in case of a revolt but, in the end, the United Kingdom and France divided what had been Ottoman Syria under the Sykes–Picot Agreement—an act of betrayal in the eyes of the Arabs. Another issue that later arose was the Balfour Declaration of 1917, in which Britain promised its support for the establishment of a Jewish "national home" in Palestine. The declaration effectively overrode the emerging principle of self-determination for the territory's existing Palestinian Arab population. Mandatory Palestine was then established in 1920, and the British obtained a Mandate for Palestine from the League of Nations in 1922. Mandatory Palestine was designated as a Class A Mandate, based on its social, political, and economic development. This classification was reserved for post-war mandates with the highest capacity for self-governance. All Class A mandates other than Mandatory Palestine had gained independence by 1946.

At the formal beginning of the Mandate, the population was approximately 11% Jewish, 9% Christian Arab, and 78% Muslim Arab. During the Mandate, the area saw successive waves of Jewish immigration and the rise of nationalist movements in both the Jewish and Arab communities. Competing interests of the two populations led to the 1936–1939 Arab revolt in Palestine and the 1944–1948 Jewish insurgency in Mandatory Palestine. The United Nations Partition Plan for Palestine, adopted by the UN General Assembly in November 1947, recommended dividing the territory into two states, one Arab and one Jewish. The 1948 Palestine war ended with the territory of Mandatory Palestine divided among the State of Israel, the Hashemite Kingdom of Transjordan, which annexed territory on the West Bank of the Jordan River, and the Kingdom of Egypt, which established the "All-Palestine Protectorate" in the Gaza Strip.

== Etymology ==
The name given to the Mandate's territory was "Palestine", in accordance with local Palestinian Arab and Ottoman usage and with European tradition. (Note: Historian Nur Masalha describes the "British preoccupation with Palestine" and the large increase in European books, articles, travelogues and geographical publications during the 18th and 19th centuries.) The Mandate charter stipulated that Mandatory Palestine would have three official languages: English, Arabic and Hebrew.

In 1926, the British authorities formally decided to use the traditional Arabic equivalent to the English name, and its Hebrew transcription i.e. Filasţīn (فلسطين) and Pālēśtīnā (פּלשׂתינה) respectively. The Jewish leadership proposed that the proper Hebrew name should be ʾĒrēts Yiśrāʾel (ארץ ישׂראל, Land of Israel). The final compromise was to append the initials of the Hebrew proposed name, Alef-Yod, within parenthesis (א״י) after Pālēśtīnā whenever the Mandate's name was mentioned in Hebrew in official documents. The Arab leadership saw this compromise as a violation of the mandate terms. Some Arab politicians suggested "Southern Syria" (سوريا الجنوبية, Sūriyā al-Janūbiyya) as the Arabic name instead. The British authorities rejected this proposal; according to the Minutes of the Ninth Session of the League of Nations' Permanent Mandates Commission:

Colonel Symes explained that the country was described as "Palestine" by Europeans and as "Falestin" by the Arabs. The Hebrew name for the country was the designation "Land of Israel", and the Government, to meet Jewish wishes, had agreed that the word "Palestine" in Hebrew characters should be followed in all official documents by the initials which stood for that designation. As a set-off to this, certain of the Arab politicians suggested that the country should be called "Southern Syria" in order to emphasise its close relation with another Arab State.

The adjective "mandatory" indicates that the entity's legal status derived from a League of Nations mandate; it derives from the meaning of "mandate" as "authorization" rather than from "mandatory" in the sense of "compulsory".

== History ==
=== 1920s ===
Palestinians in Jaffa in the 1920s

Following the arrival of the British, Arab inhabitants established Muslim-Christian Associations in all of the major towns. In 1919 they joined to hold the first Palestine Arab Congress in Jerusalem. It was aimed primarily at representative government and opposition to the Balfour Declaration. Concurrently, the Zionist Commission formed in March 1918 and actively promoted Zionist objectives in Palestine. On 19 April 1920, elections took place for the Assembly of Representatives of the Palestinian Jewish community.

In April 1920, riots in Jerusalem caused the deaths of five Jews and four Arabs.

In July 1920, a British civilian administration headed by a High Commissioner replaced the military administration. The first High Commissioner, Sir Herbert Samuel, a Zionist and a recent British cabinet minister, arrived in Palestine on 20 June 1920 to take up his appointment from 1 July. Samuel established his headquarters and official residence in part of the Augusta Victoria Hospital complex on Mount Scopus on what was then the northeastern edge of Jerusalem, a building that had been constructed for the Germans circa 1910. Damaged by an earthquake in 1927, this building served as the headquarters and official residence of the British High Commissioners until 1933. In that year, a new, purpose-built headquarters and official residence for the High Commissioner was completed on what was then the southeastern edge of Jerusalem. Referred to as Armon HaNetziv by the Jewish population, this building, located on the 'Hill of Evil Counsel' on the ridge of Jabel Mukaber, remained in use as the headquarters and official residence of the British High Commissioners until the end of British rule in 1948.

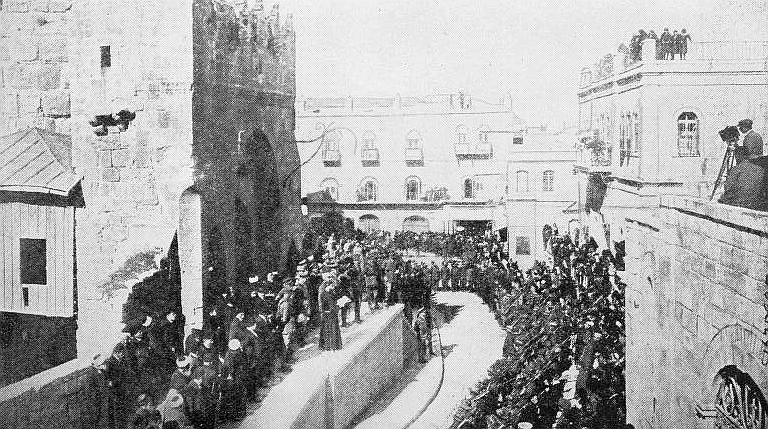
The formal transfer of Jerusalem to British rule, with a "native priest" reading the proclamation from the steps of the Tower of David

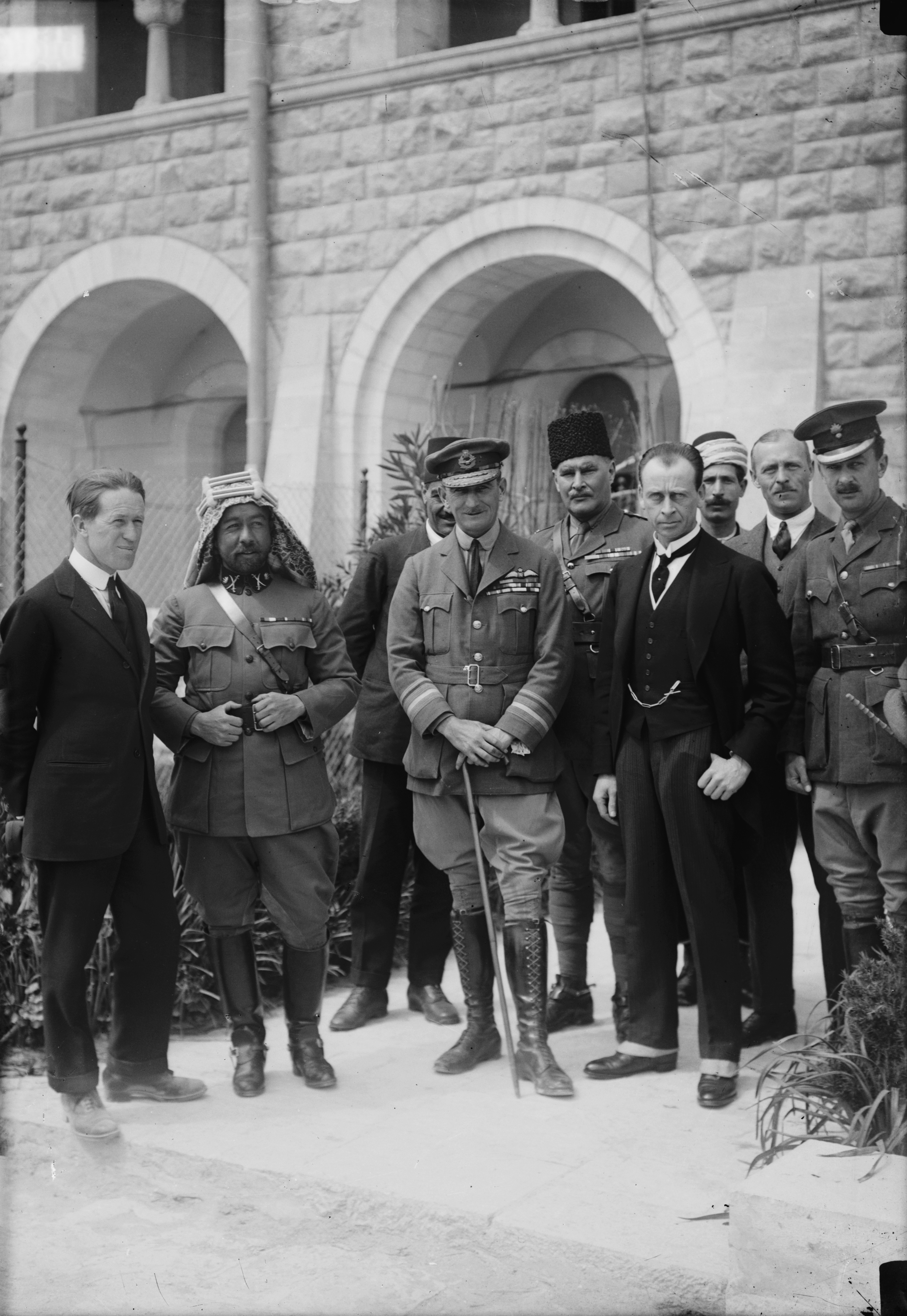
The arrival of Sir Herbert Samuel. From left to right: T. E. Lawrence, Emir Abdullah, Air Marshal Sir Geoffrey Salmond, Sir Wyndham Deedes and others

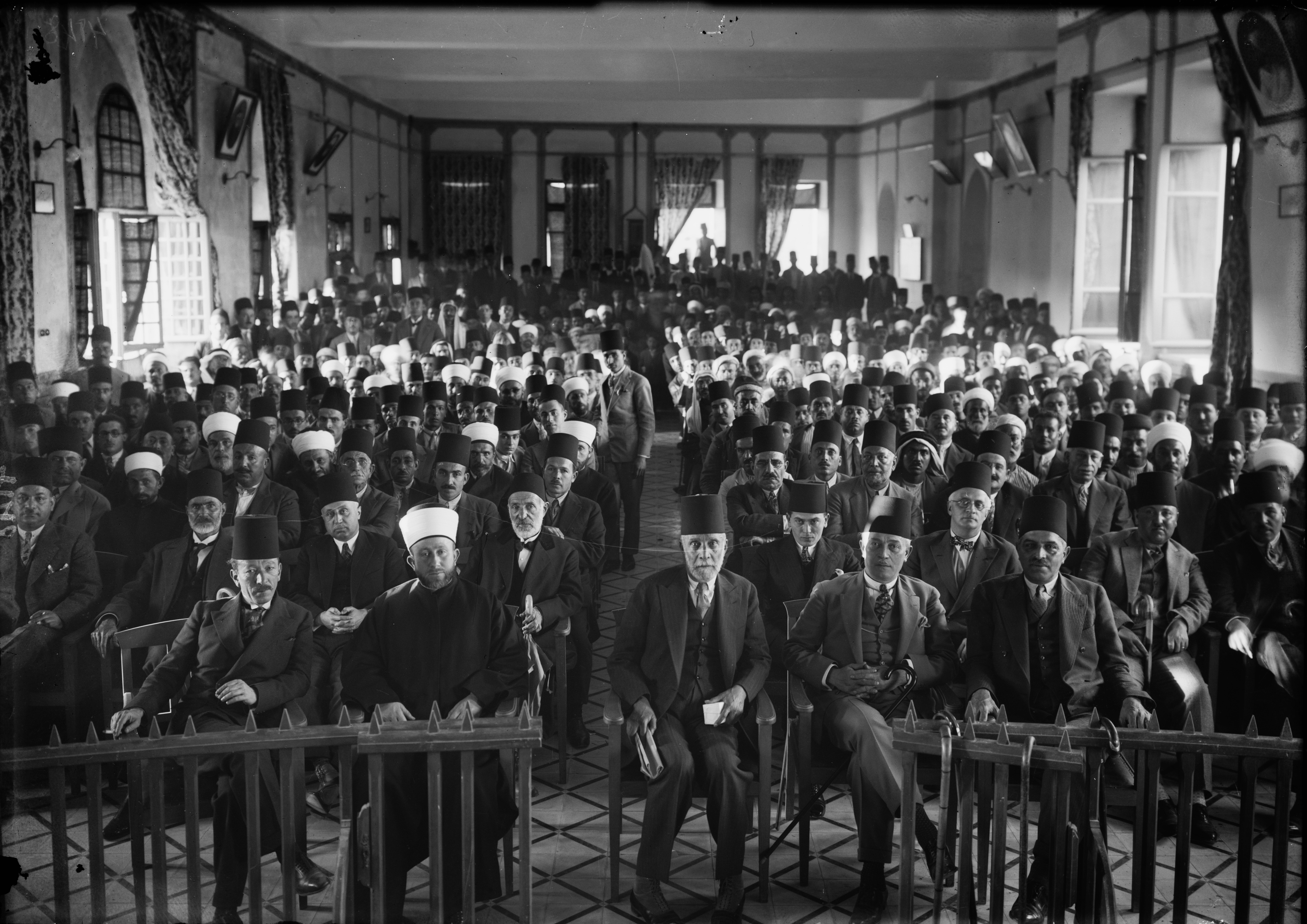
An Arab "protest gathering" in session, in the Rawdat el Maaref hall, 1929. From left to right : unknown – Amin al-Husayni – Musa al-Husayni – Raghib al-Nashashibi – unknown

One of the first actions of the newly installed civil administration was to begin granting concessions from the Mandatory government over key economic assets. In 1921 the government granted Pinhas Rutenberg – a Jewish entrepreneur – concessions for the production and distribution of electrical power. Rutenberg soon established an electric company whose shareholders were Zionist organisations, investors, and philanthropists. Palestinian-Arabs saw it as proof that the British intended to favour Zionism. The British administration claimed that electrification would enhance the economic development of the country as a whole, while at the same time securing their commitment to facilitate a Jewish National Home through economic – rather than political – means.

In May 1921, following a disturbance between rival Jewish left-wing protestors and then attacks by Arabs on Jews, almost 100 died in rioting in Jaffa.

High Commissioner Samuel tried to establish self-governing institutions in Palestine, as required by the mandate, but the Arab leadership refused to co-operate with any institution which included Jewish participation. When Kamil al-Husayni, the Grand Mufti of Jerusalem, died in March 1921, High Commissioner Samuel appointed his half-brother, Mohammad Amin al-Husseini, to the position. Amin al-Husseini, a member of the al-Husayni clan of Jerusalem, was an Arab nationalist and Muslim leader. As Grand Mufti, as well as in the other influential positions that he held during this period, al-Husseini played a key role in violent opposition to Zionism. In 1922, al-Husseini was elected President of the Supreme Muslim Council which had been established by Samuel in December 1921. The Council controlled the Waqf funds, worth annually tens of thousands of pounds, and the orphan funds, worth annually about £50,000, as compared to the £600,000 in the Jewish Agency's annual budget. In addition, he controlled the Islamic courts in Palestine. Among other functions, these courts had the power to appoint teachers and preachers.

The 1922 Palestine Order in Council established a Legislative Council, which was to consist of 23 members: 12 elected, 10 appointed, and the High Commissioner. Of the 12 elected members, eight were to be Muslim Arabs, two Christian Arabs, and two Jews. Arabs protested against the distribution of the seats, arguing that as they constituted 88% of the population, having only 43% of the seats was unfair. Elections took place in February and March 1923, but due to an Arab boycott, the results were annulled and a 12-member Advisory Council was established.

At the First World Congress of Jewish Women which was held in Vienna, Austria, 1923, it was decided that: "It appears, therefore, to be the duty of all Jews to co-operate in the social-economic reconstruction of Palestine and to assist in the settlement of Jews in that country."

In October 1923, Britain provided the League of Nations with a report on the administration of Palestine for the period 1920–1922, which covered the period before the mandate.

In August 1929, there were riots in which 250 people died.

=== 1930s: Arab armed insurgency ===
In 1930, Sheikh Izz ad-Din al-Qassam arrived in Palestine from Syria, then part of the French-ruled Mandate for Syria and the Lebanon, and organised and established the Black Hand, an anti-Zionist and anti-British militant organisation. He recruited and arranged military training for peasants, and by 1935 he had enlisted between 200 and 800 men. They used bombs and firearms against Zionist settlers and vandalised settlers' orchards and British-built railway lines. In November 1935, two of his men engaged in a firefight with a Palestine Police patrol hunting fruit thieves and a policeman was killed. Following the incident, British colonial police launched a search and surrounded al-Qassam in a cave near Ya'bad. In the ensuing battle, al-Qassam was killed.

==== The Arab revolt ====
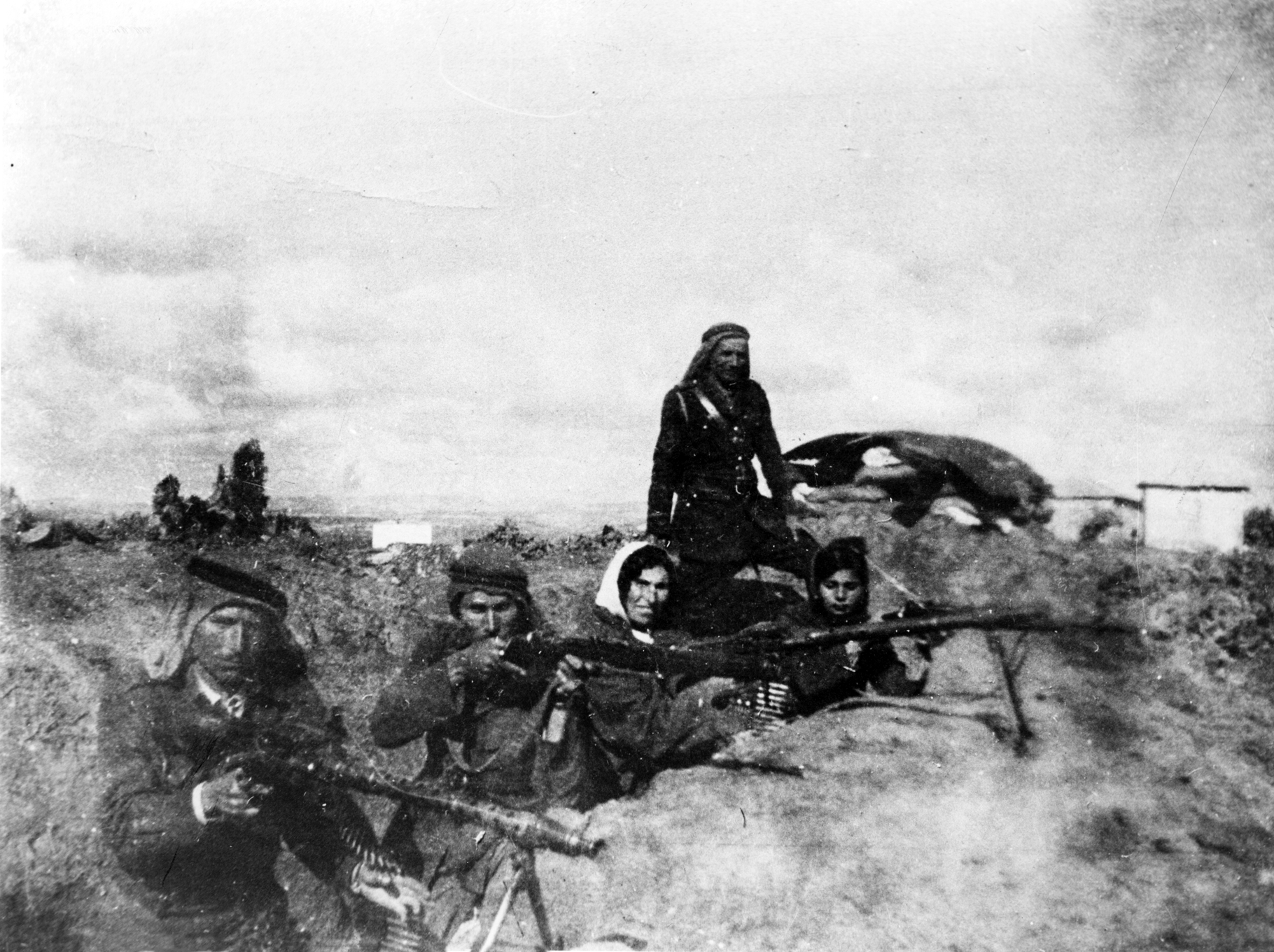
Arab revolt against the British

The death of al-Qassam on 20 November 1935 generated widespread outrage in the Arab community. Huge crowds accompanied Qassam's body to his grave in Haifa. A few months later, in April 1936, the Arab national general strike broke out. The strike lasted until October 1936, instigated by the Arab Higher Committee, headed by Amin al-Husseini. During the summer of that year, thousands of Jewish-farmed acres and orchards were destroyed. Jewish civilians were attacked and killed, and some Jewish communities, such as those in Beisan (Beit She'an) and Acre, fled to safer areas. The violence abated for about a year while the British sent the Peel Commission to investigate.

During the first stages of the Arab Revolt, due to rivalry between the clans of al-Husseini and Nashashibi among the Palestinian Arabs, Raghib Nashashibi was forced to flee to Egypt after several assassination attempts ordered by Amin al-Husseini.

After the Arab rejection of the Peel Commission recommendation, the revolt resumed in autumn 1937. Over the next 18 months, the British lost Nablus and Hebron. British forces, supported by 6,000 armed Jewish auxiliary police, suppressed the widespread riots with overwhelming force. The British officer Charles Orde Wingate (who supported a Zionist revival for religious reasons) organised Special Night Squads of British soldiers and Jewish volunteers such as Yigal Allon; these "scored significant successes against the Arab rebels in the lower Galilee and in the Jezreel valley" by conducting raids on Arab villages. Irgun, a Jewish militia group, used violence also against Arab civilians as "retaliatory acts", attacking marketplaces and buses.

By the time the revolt concluded in March 1939, more than 5,000 Arabs, 400 Jews, and 200 British had been killed and at least 15,000 Arabs were wounded. In total, 10% of the adult Arab male population was killed, wounded, imprisoned, or exiled. From 1936 to 1945, while establishing collaborative security arrangements with the Jewish Agency, the British confiscated 13,200 firearms from Arabs and 521 weapons from Jews.

The attacks on the Jewish population by Arabs had three lasting effects: firstly, they led to the formation and development of Jewish underground militias, primarily the Haganah, which were to prove decisive in 1948. Secondly, it became clear that the two communities could not be reconciled, and the idea of partition was born. Thirdly, the British responded to Arab opposition with the White Paper of 1939, which severely restricted Jewish land purchase and immigration. However, with the advent of the Second World War, even this reduced immigration quota was not reached. The White Paper policy itself radicalised segments of the Jewish population, who after the war would no longer cooperate with the British.

The revolt had also a negative effect on Palestinian Arab leadership, social cohesion, and military capabilities, and it contributed to the outcome of the 1948 War because "when the Palestinians faced their most fateful challenge in 1947–1949, they were still suffering from the British repression of 1936–1939, and were in effect without a unified leadership. Indeed, it might be argued that they were virtually without any leadership at all."

==== Partition proposals ====
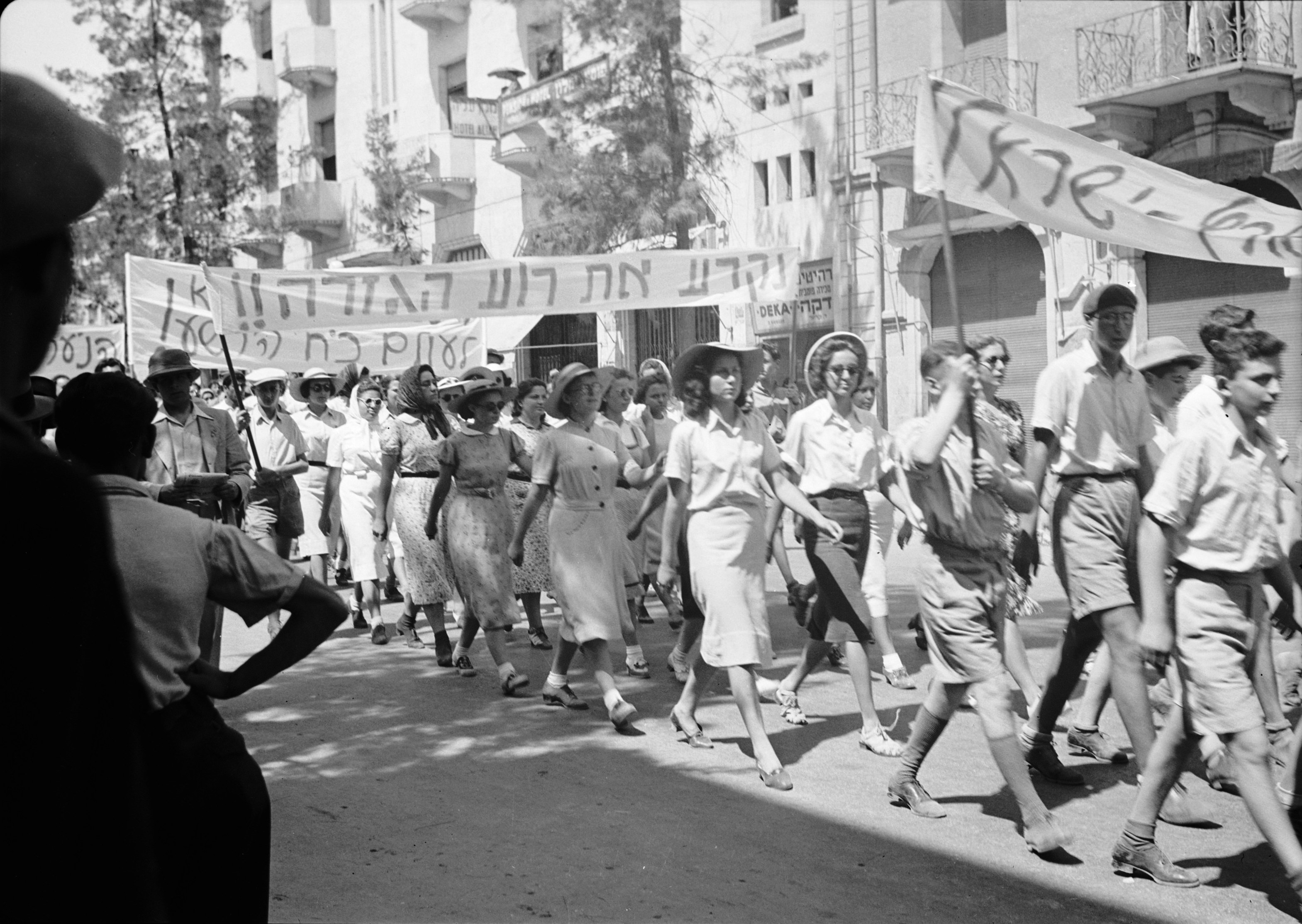
Jewish demonstration against White Paper in Jerusalem in 1939

In 1937, the Peel Commission proposed a partition between a small Jewish state, whose Arab population would have to be transferred, and an Arab state to be attached to the Emirate of Transjordan, this emirate also being part of the wider Mandate for Palestine. The proposal was rejected outright by the Arabs. The two main Jewish leaders, Chaim Weizmann and David Ben-Gurion, had convinced the Zionist Congress to equivocally approve the Peel recommendations as a basis for more negotiation. In a letter to his son in October 1937, Ben-Gurion explained that partition would be a first step to "possession of the land as a whole". He expressed similar views on other occasions, including in an address to the Zionist Executive in 1937, when he stated that after they had established a state and formed a "large army", they would "abolish partition" and "expand to the whole of Palestine". He was recorded as reiterating similar views at a meeting of the Jewish Agency executive in June 1938. Chaim Weizmann also expressed similar views.

Following the London Conference in February and March 1939, the British Government published a White Paper which proposed a limit to Jewish immigration from Europe, restrictions on Jewish land purchases, and a programme for creating an independent state to replace the Mandate within ten years. This was seen by the Yishuv as betrayal of the mandatory terms, especially in light of the increasing persecution of Jews in Europe. In response, Zionists organised Aliyah Bet, a programme of illegal immigration into Palestine. Lehi, a small group of extremist Zionists, staged armed attacks on British authorities in Palestine. However, the Jewish Agency, which represented the mainstream Zionist leadership and most of the Jewish population, still hoped to persuade Britain to allow resumed Jewish immigration and cooperated with Britain during the Second World War.

=== Second World War ===
==== Allied and Axis activity ====
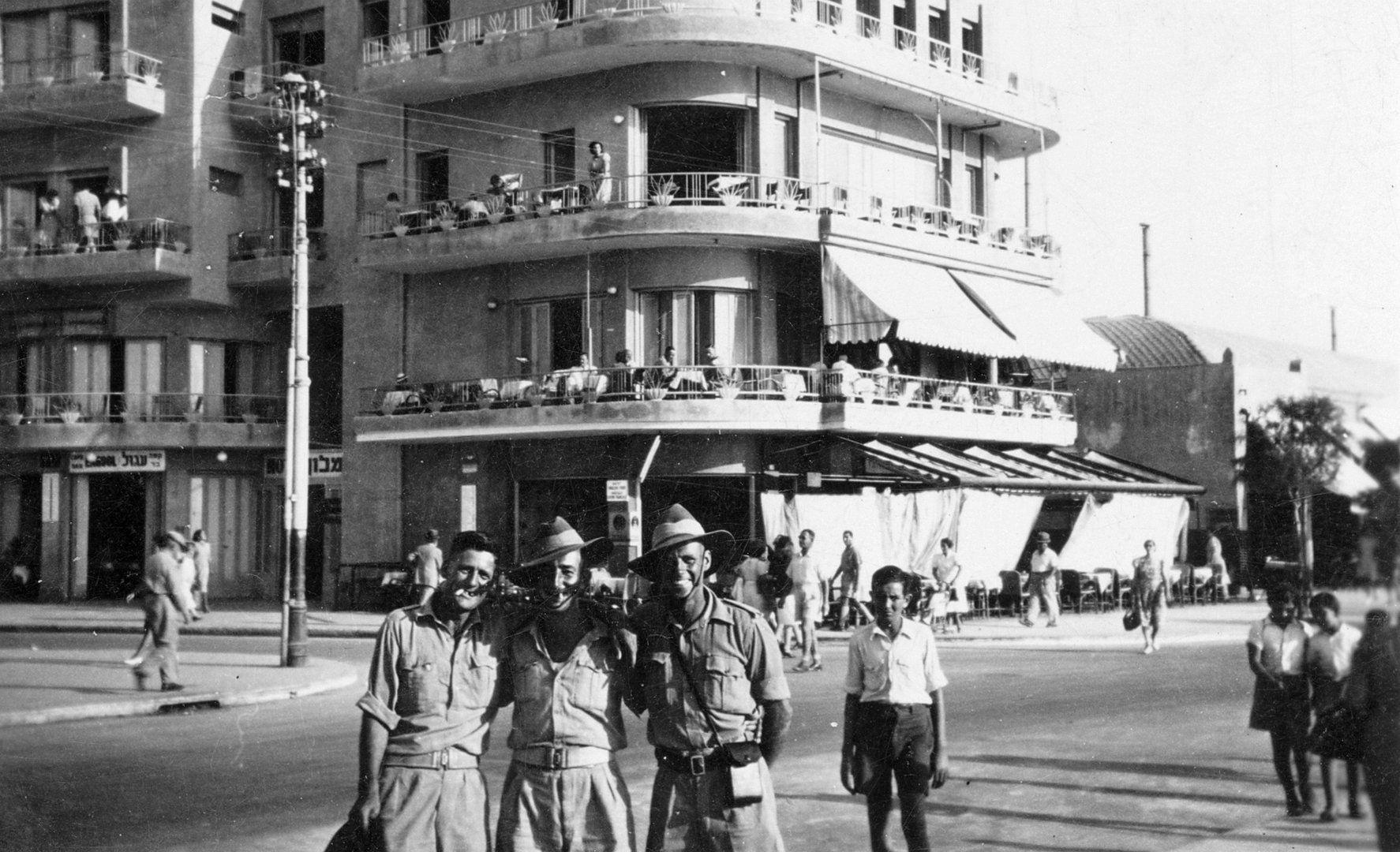
Australian soldiers in Tel Aviv in 1942

On 10 June 1940, during the Second World War, the Kingdom of Italy declared war on the British Empire and sided with Nazi Germany. Within a month, the Italians attacked Palestine from the air, bombing Tel Aviv and Haifa, inflicting multiple casualties.

In 1942, there was a period of great concern for the Yishuv, when the German forces of General Erwin Rommel advanced east across North Africa towards the Suez Canal, raising a fear that they would conquer Palestine. This period was referred to as the "200 days of dread". This event was the direct cause for the founding, with British support, of the Palmach – a highly trained regular unit belonging to Haganah (a paramilitary group composed mostly of reserves).

The Yishuv rallied around the Allied war effort despite anger over British restrictions on Jewish immigration in the White Paper of 1939. David Ben-Gurion, Chairman of the Jewish Agency, declared that "We will fight the White Paper as if there is no war, and fight the war as if there is no White Paper." About 30,000 Jews from Mandatory Palestine served with the British Armed Forces during the war, more than 700 of whom were killed in action.

As in most of the Arab world, there was no unanimity amongst the Palestinian Arabs as to their position regarding the belligerents in the Second World War. A number of leaders and public figures saw an Axis victory as the likely outcome and a way of securing Palestine back from the Zionists and the British. Even though Arabs were not highly regarded by Nazi racial theory, the Nazis encouraged Arab support as a counter to British hegemony. On the anniversary of the Balfour Declaration in 1943, Reichsführer-SS Heinrich Himmler and Foreign Minister Joachim von Ribbentrop sent telegrams of support for the Grand Mufti of Jerusalem, Mohammad Amin al-Husseini, to read out for a radio broadcast to a rally of supporters in Berlin. (Note: From Himmler: The National Socialist movement of Greater Germany has, since its inception, inscribed upon its flag the fight against the world Jewry. It has therefore followed with particular sympathy the struggle of freedom-loving Arabs, especially in Palestine, against Jewish interlopers. In the recognition of this enemy and of the common struggle against it lies the firm foundation of the natural alliance that exists between the National Socialist Greater Germany and the freedom-loving Muslims of the whole world. In this spirit I am sending you on the anniversary of the infamous Balfour declaration my hearty greetings and wishes for the successful pursuit of your struggle until the final victory. From Ribbentrop: I am sending my greetings to your eminence and to the participants of the meeting held today in the Reich capital under your chairmanship. Germany is linked to the Arab nation by old ties of friendship, and today we are united more than ever before. The elimination of the socalled Jewish national home and the liberation of all Arab countries from the oppression and exploitation of the Western powers is an unchangeable part of the Great German Reich policy. Let the hour not be far off when the Arab nation will be able to build its future and find unity in full independence.) On the other hand, as many as 12,000 Palestinian Arabs, with the endorsement of many prominent figures such as the mayors of Nablus and Gaza and media such as "Radio Palestine" (Note: For example, Radio Palestine broadcast the comments of an Egyptian writer who said, "The war is between the lofty and humane values represented by England and the forces of darkness represented by the Nazis.") and the prominent Jaffa-based Falastin newspaper, (Note: A British recruiting poster in Arabic, published in the Falastin newspaper in January 1942, read: "She couldn't stop thinking about contribution and sacrifice, she felt ongoing pride and exaltation of spirit – when she did what she saw as her sacred duty for her nation and its sons. When your country is crying out to you and asking for your service, when your country makes it plain that our Arab men need your love and support, and when your country reminds you of how cruel the enemy is – when your country is calling you, can you stand by and do nothing?") volunteered to join and fight for the British, with many serving in units that also included Jews from Palestine. 120 Palestinian women also served as part of the Auxiliary Territorial Service. However, this history has been less studied, as Israeli sources put more focus in studying the role played by Jewish soldiers. Meanwhile, Palestinian sources "were not eager to glorify the names of those who cooperated with Britain not so many years after the British put down the Arab Revolt of 1936–1939, and thereby indirectly helped the Jews establish a state."

==== Mobilisation ====
Jewish Brigade headquarters under the Union Flag and Jewish flag

On 3 July 1944, the British government consented to the establishment of a Jewish Brigade within the British Army, consisting of Jews primarily from Palestine led by hand-picked Jewish and also non-Jewish senior officers. On 20 September 1944, an official communiqué by the War Office announced the formation of the Jewish Brigade Group of the British Army. The Jewish Brigade was shipped to Italy, where it joined the British Eighth Army under the 15th Army Group, and fought in the Spring Offensive of the Italian Campaign. The Jewish Brigade was then stationed in Tarvisio, near the border triangle of Italy, Yugoslavia, and Austria, where it played a key role in the Berihah's efforts to help Jews escape Europe for Palestine, a role many of its members would continue after the brigade was disbanded. Among its projects was the education and care of the Selvino children. Later, veterans of the Jewish Brigade were to play a major role in the foundation of the Israel Defense Forces (IDF).

Besides Jews and Arabs from Palestine, in total by mid-1944 the British had assembled a multiethnic force consisting of volunteer European Jewish refugees (from German-occupied countries), Yemenite Jews and Abyssinian Jews.

==== The Holocaust and immigration quotas ====
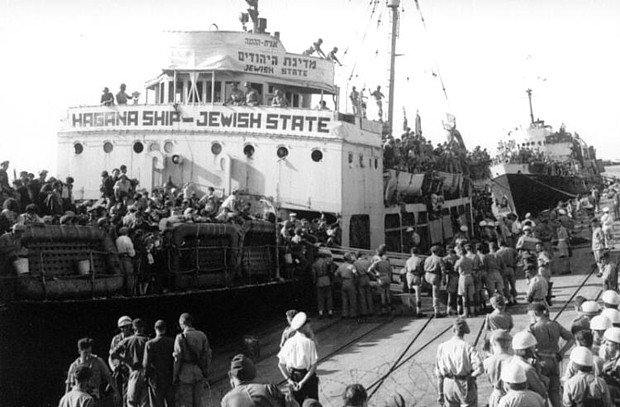
Jewish State ship, one of several Haganah ships that carried Jewish immigrants from Europe, mostly illegal, at the Haifa Port, Mandatory Palestine, 1947

In 1939, as a consequence of the White Paper of 1939, the British reduced the number of immigrants allowed into Palestine. The Second World War and the Holocaust started shortly thereafter and once the 15,000 annual quota was exceeded, Jews fleeing Nazi persecution were interned in detention camps or deported to places such as Mauritius.

Starting in 1939, a clandestine immigration effort called Aliya Bet was spearheaded by an organisation called Mossad LeAliyah Bet. Tens of thousands of European Jews escaped the Nazis in boats and small ships headed for Palestine. The British Royal Navy intercepted many of the vessels; others were unseaworthy and were wrecked; a Haganah bomb sunk the SS Patria, killing 267 people; two other ships were sunk by Soviet submarines: the motor schooner Struma was torpedoed and sunk in the Black Sea by a Soviet submarine in February 1942 with the loss of nearly 800 lives. The last refugee boats to try to reach Palestine during the war were the Bulbul, Mefküre and Morina in August 1944. A Soviet submarine sank the motor schooner Mefküre by torpedo and shellfire and machine-gunned survivors in the water, killing between 300 and 400 refugees. Illegal immigration resumed after the end of the Second World War, especially by the Haganah, who carried mostly illegal Jewish immigrants in the period 1945–47.

After the war, 250,000 Jewish refugees were stranded in displaced persons (DP) camps in Europe. Despite the pressure of world opinion, in particular the repeated requests of the U.S. President, Harry S. Truman, and the recommendations of the Anglo-American Committee of Inquiry that 100,000 Jews be immediately granted entry to Palestine, the British maintained the ban on immigration.

==== Beginning of Zionist insurgency ====
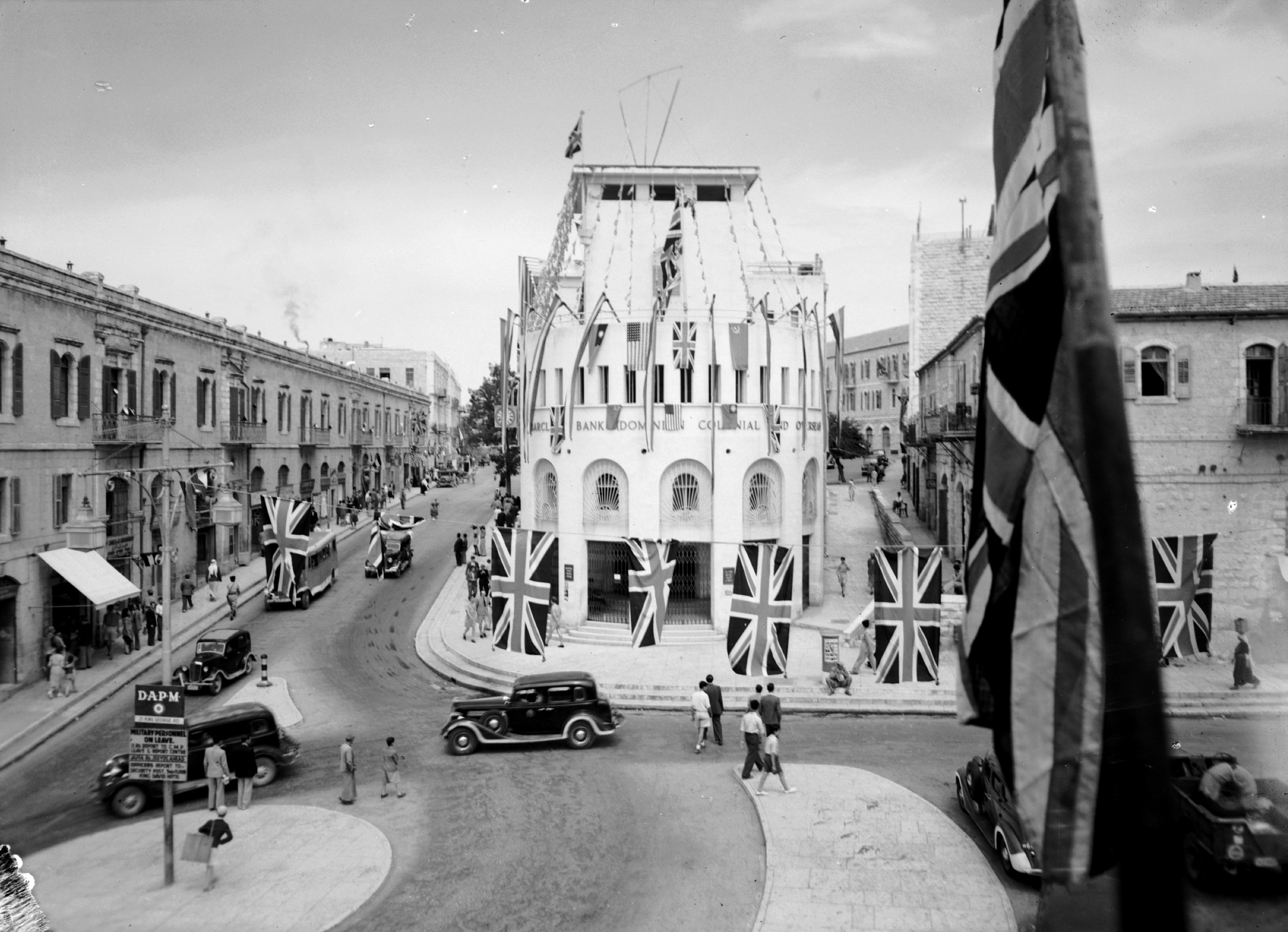
Jerusalem on VE Day, 8 May 1945

The Jewish Lehi (Fighters for the Freedom of Israel) and Irgun (National Military Organisation) movements initiated violent uprisings against the British Mandate in the 1940s. On 6 November 1944, Eliyahu Hakim and Eliyahu Bet Zuri (members of Lehi) assassinated Lord Moyne in Cairo. Moyne was the British Minister of State for the Middle East and the assassination is said by some to have turned British Prime Minister Winston Churchill against the Zionist cause. After the assassination of Lord Moyne, the Haganah kidnapped, interrogated, and turned over to the British many members of the Irgun ("The Hunting Season"), and the Jewish Agency Executive decided on a series of measures against "terrorist organisations" in Palestine. Irgun ordered its members not to resist or retaliate with violence, so as to prevent a civil war.

=== After the Second World War: Insurgency and the Partition Plan ===
The three main Jewish underground forces later united to form the Jewish Resistance Movement and carry out several attacks and bombings against the British administration. In 1946, the Irgun blew up the King David Hotel in Jerusalem, the southern wing of which was the headquarters of the British administration, killing 92 people. Following the bombing, the British Government began interning illegal Jewish immigrants in Cyprus.

On 12 November 1947, two weeks before the United Nations voted on partitioning, British soldiers attacked a house in Ra'anana where a Lehi training course for young people was being held. Four trainees aged 16–18 and their 19-year-old instructor were murdered as a calculated retribution against Lehi during the attack known as Murder of Youths in Ra'anana by British Soldiers. In 2001, over 5,000 documents that were declassified by the Israeli State Archives revealed deaths and killing of Jews at the hands of British soldiers, which were covered up by claiming self defence acts or accidents. This included the shooting of the 5 teenagers in Raanana.

In 1948, the Lehi assassinated Count Bernadotte, the UN mediator, in Jerusalem. Yitzak Shamir, a future Prime Minister of Israel, was one of the conspirators.

The UN Partition Plan

The negative publicity resulting from the situation in Palestine caused the Mandate to become widely unpopular in Britain itself and caused the United States Congress to delay granting the British vital loans for reconstruction. The British Labour Party had promised before its election in 1945 to allow mass Jewish migration into Palestine but reneged on this promise once in office. Anti-British Jewish militancy increased, and the situation required the presence of over 100,000 British troops in the country. Following the Acre Prison Break and the retaliatory hanging of British sergeants by the Irgun, the British announced their desire to terminate the mandate and to withdraw by no later than the beginning of August 1948.

The Anglo-American Committee of Inquiry in 1946 was a joint attempt by Britain and the United States to agree on a policy regarding the admission of Jews to Palestine. In April, the Committee reported that its members had arrived at a unanimous decision. The Committee approved the American recommendation of the immediate acceptance of 100,000 Jewish refugees from Europe into Palestine. It also recommended that there be no Arab or Jewish state. The Committee stated that "in order to dispose, once and for all, of the exclusive claims of Jews and Arabs to Palestine, we regard it as essential that a clear statement of principle should be made that Jew shall not dominate Arab and Arab shall not dominate Jew in Palestine". U.S. President Harry S. Truman angered the British Government by issuing a statement supporting the 100,000 refugees but refusing to acknowledge the rest of the committee's findings. Britain had asked for U.S. assistance in implementing the recommendations. The US War Department had said earlier that to assist Britain in maintaining order against an Arab revolt, an open-ended US commitment of 300,000 troops would be necessary. The immediate admission of 100,000 new Jewish immigrants would almost certainly have provoked an Arab uprising.

These events were the decisive factors that forced Britain to announce their desire to terminate the Palestine Mandate and place the Question of Palestine before the United Nations, the successor to the League of Nations. The UN created UNSCOP (the UN Special Committee on Palestine) on 15 May 1947, with representatives from 11 countries. UNSCOP conducted hearings and made a general survey of the situation in Palestine and issued its report on 31 August. Seven members (Canada, Czechoslovakia, Guatemala, Netherlands, Peru, Sweden, and Uruguay) recommended the creation of independent Arab and Jewish states, with Jerusalem to be placed under international administration. Three members (India, Iran, and Yugoslavia) supported the creation of a single federal state containing both Jewish and Arab constituent states. Australia abstained.

On 29 November 1947, the UN General Assembly, voting 33 to 13, with 10 abstentions, adopted a resolution recommending the adoption and implementation of the Plan of Partition with Economic Union as Resolution 181 (II), while making some adjustments to the boundaries between the two states proposed by it. The division was to take effect on the date of British withdrawal. The partition plan required that the proposed states grant full civil rights to all people within their borders, regardless of race, religion or gender. The UN General Assembly is only granted the power to make recommendations; therefore, UNGAR 181 was not legally binding. Both the US and the Soviet Union supported the resolution. Haiti, Liberia, and the Philippines changed their votes at the last moment after concerted pressure from the US and from Zionist organisations. The five members of the Arab League, who were voting members at the time, voted against the Plan.

The Jewish Agency, which was the Jewish state-in-formation, accepted the plan, and nearly all the Jews in Palestine rejoiced at the news.

The partition plan was rejected by the Palestinian Arab leadership and by most of the Arab population. (Note: p. 50, at 1947 "Haj Amin al-Husseini went one better: he denounced also the minority report, which, in his view, legitimized the Jewish foothold in Palestine, a "partition in disguise", as he put it."; p. 66, at 1946 "The League demanded independence for Palestine as a "unitary" state, with an Arab majority and minority rights for the Jews. The AHC went one better and insisted that the proportion of Jews to Arabs in the unitary state should stand at one to six, meaning that only Jews who lived in Palestine before the British Mandate be eligible for citizenship"; p. 67, at 1947 "The League's Political Committee met in Sofar, Lebanon, on 16–19 September, and urged the Palestine Arabs to fight partition, which it called "aggression", "without mercy". The League promised them, in line with Bludan, assistance "in manpower, money and equipment" should the United Nations endorse partition."; p. 72, at Dec 1947 "The League vowed, in very general language, "to try to stymie the partition plan and prevent the establishment of a Jewish state in Palestine,") (Note: "The Arabs rejected the United Nations Partition Plan so that any comment of theirs did not specifically concern the status of the Arab section of Palestine under partition but rather rejected the scheme in its entirety.") Meeting in Cairo on November and December 1947, the Arab League then adopted a series of resolutions endorsing a military solution to the conflict.

Britain announced that it would accept the partition plan, but refused to enforce it, arguing it was not accepted by the Arabs. Britain also refused to share the administration of Palestine with the UN Palestine Commission during the transitional period. In September 1947, the British government announced that the Mandate for Palestine would end at midnight on 14 May 1948.

Some Jewish organisations also opposed the proposal. Irgun leader Menachem Begin announced, "The partition of the Homeland is illegal. It will never be recognised. The signature by institutions and individuals of the partition agreement is invalid. It will not bind the Jewish people. Jerusalem was and will forever be our capital. Eretz Israel will be restored to the people of Israel. All of it. And for ever."

=== Termination of the mandate ===
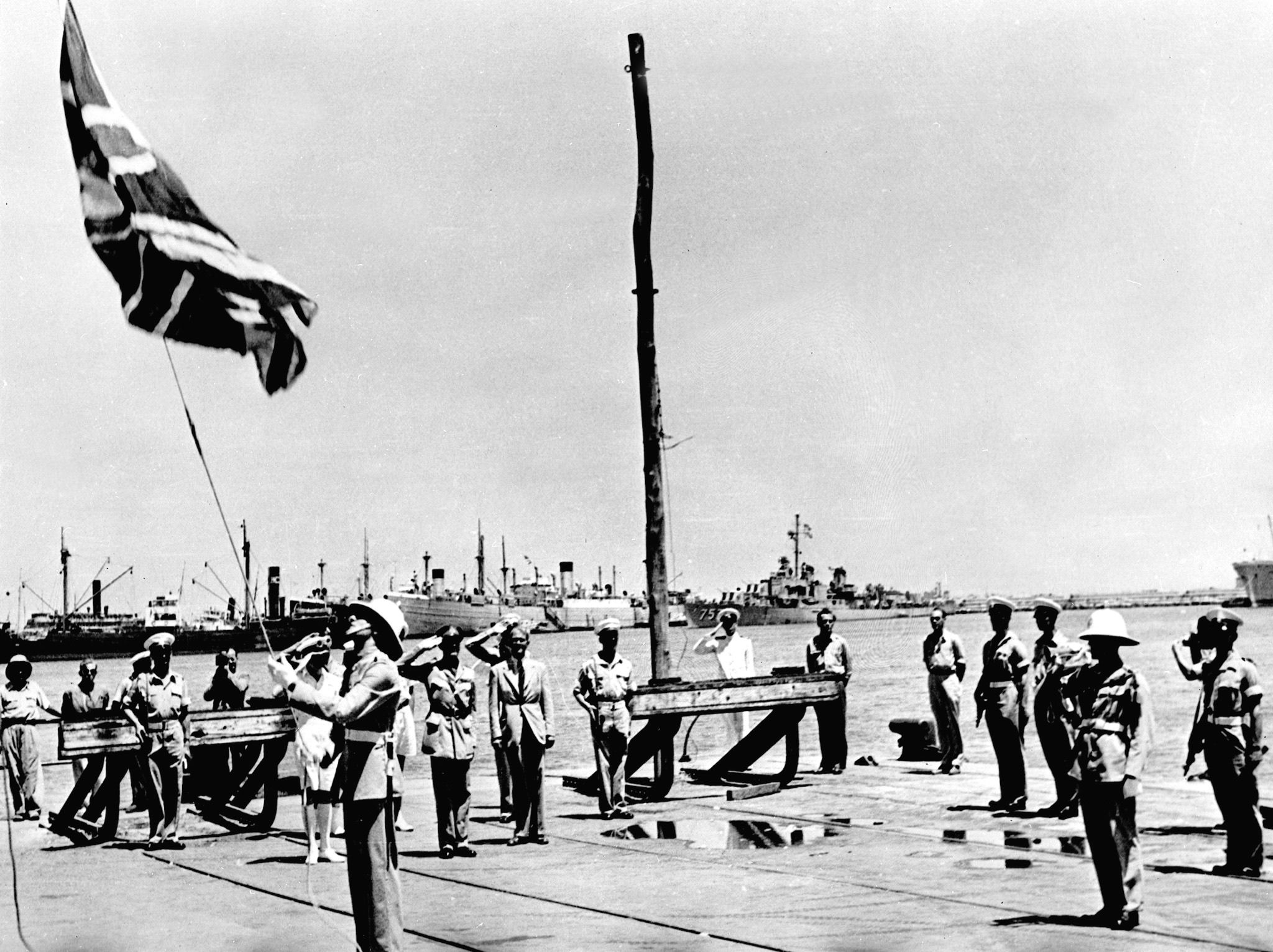
British troops leaving Haifa in 1948

When the United Kingdom announced the independence of the Emirate of Transjordan as the Hashemite Kingdom of Transjordan in 1946, the final Assembly of the League of Nations and the General Assembly both adopted resolutions welcoming the news. The Jewish Agency objected, claiming that Transjordan was an integral part of Palestine, and that according to Article 80 of the UN Charter, the Jewish people had a secured interest in its territory.

During the General Assembly deliberations on Palestine, there were suggestions that it would be desirable to incorporate part of Transjordan's territory into the proposed Jewish state. A few days before the adoption of Resolution 181 (II) on 29 November 1947, US Secretary of State Marshall noted frequent references had been made by the Ad Hoc Committee regarding the desirability of the Jewish State having both the Negev and an "outlet to the Red Sea and the Port of Aqaba". According to John Snetsinger, Chaim Weizmann visited President Truman on 19 November 1947 and said it was imperative that the Negev and Port of Aqaba be within the Jewish state. Truman telephoned the US delegation to the UN and told them he supported Weizmann's position. However, the Trans-Jordan memorandum excluded territories of the Emirate of Transjordan from any Jewish settlement.

Immediately after the UN resolution, civil war broke out between the Arab and Jewish communities, and British authority began to break down. On 16 December 1947, the Palestine Police Force withdrew from the Tel Aviv area, home to more than half the Jewish population, and turned over responsibility for the maintenance of law and order to Jewish police. As the civil war raged on, British military forces gradually withdrew from Palestine, although they occasionally intervened in favour of either side. Many of these areas became war zones. The British maintained strong presences in Jerusalem and Haifa, even as Jerusalem came under siege by Arab forces and became the scene of fierce fighting, though the British occasionally intervened in the fighting, largely to secure their evacuation routes, including by proclaiming martial law and enforcing truces. The Palestine Police Force was largely inoperative, and government services such as social welfare, water supplies, and postal services were withdrawn. In March 1948, all British judges in Palestine were sent back to Britain. In April 1948, the British withdrew from most of Haifa but retained an enclave in the port area to be used in the evacuation of British forces, and retained RAF Ramat David, an airbase close to Haifa, to cover their retreat, leaving behind a volunteer police force to maintain order. The city was quickly captured by the Haganah in the Battle of Haifa. After the victory, British forces in Jerusalem announced that they had no intention of overseeing any local administration but also that they would not permit actions that would hamper the safe and orderly withdrawal of their forces; military courts would try anybody who interfered. By this time British authority in most of Palestine had broken down, with most of the country in the hands of Jews or Arabs, but the British air and sea blockade of Palestine remained in place. Although Arab volunteers were able to cross the borders between Palestine and the surrounding Arab states to join the fighting, the British did not allow the regular armies of the surrounding Arab states to cross into Palestine.

The British had notified the UN of their intent to terminate the mandate not later than 1 August 1948. However, early in 1948, the United Kingdom announced its firm intention to end its mandate in Palestine on 15 May. In response, President Harry S. Truman made a statement on 25 March proposing UN trusteeship rather than partition, stating that "unfortunately, it has become clear that the partition plan cannot be carried out at this time by peaceful means... unless emergency action is taken, there will be no public authority in Palestine on that date capable of preserving law and order. Violence and bloodshed will descend upon the Holy Land. Large-scale fighting among the people of that country will be the inevitable result". The British Parliament passed the necessary legislation to terminate the Mandate with the Palestine Bill, which received Royal assent on 29 April 1948.

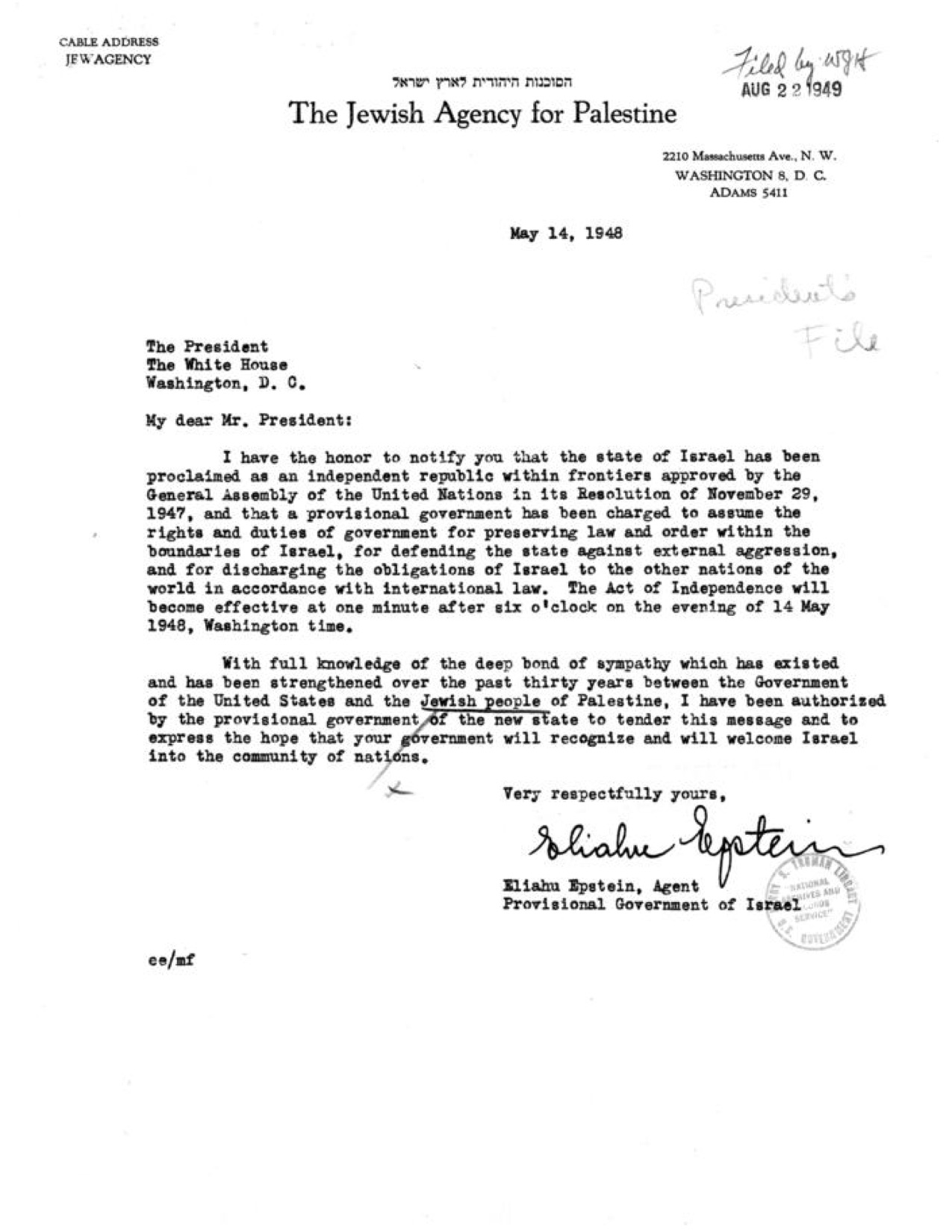
On the day of its proclamation, Eliahu Epstein wrote to Harry S. Truman that the state had been proclaimed "within the frontiers approved by the General Assembly of the United Nations in its Resolution of November 29, 1947".

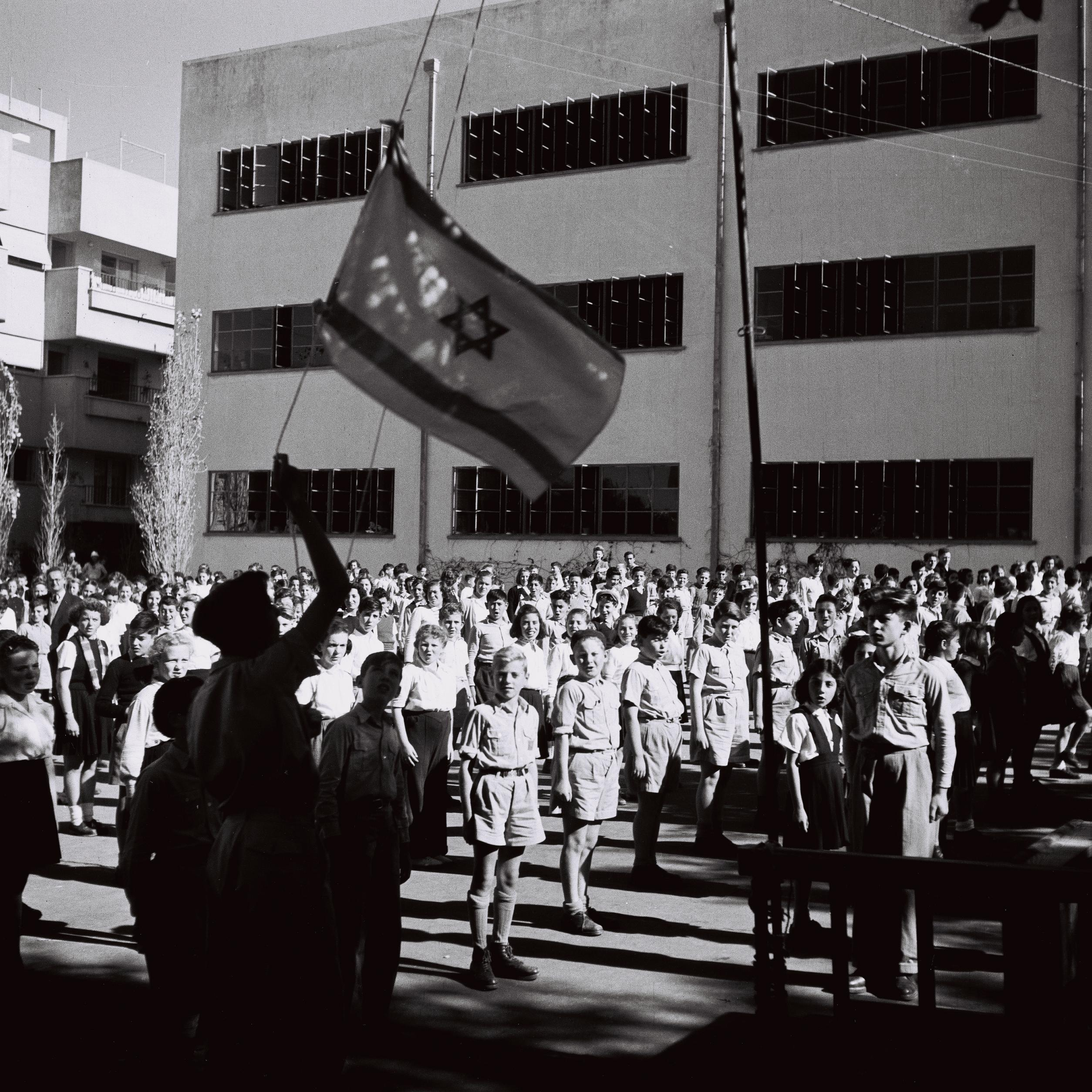
Hoisting of the Yishuv flag in Tel Aviv, 1 January 1948

By 14 May 1948, the only British forces remaining in Palestine were in the Haifa area and in Jerusalem. On that same day, the British garrison in Jerusalem withdrew, and the last High Commissioner, General Sir Alan Cunningham, left the city for Haifa, where he was to leave the country by sea. The Jewish leadership, led by the future Prime Minister, David Ben-Gurion, declared the establishment of a Jewish State in Eretz-Israel, to be known as the State of Israel, on the afternoon of 14 May 1948 (5 Iyar 5708 in the Hebrew calendar), to come into effect at the moment of termination of the Mandate at midnight. Also on the 14th, the Provisional Government of Israel asked the US Government for recognition, on the frontiers specified in the UN Plan for Partition. The United States immediately replied, recognizing "the provisional government as the de facto authority".

At midnight on 14/15 May 1948, the Mandate for Palestine expired, and the State of Israel came into being. The Palestine Government formally ceased to exist, the status of British forces still in the process of withdrawal from Haifa changed to occupiers of foreign territory, the Palestine Police Force formally stood down and was disbanded, with the remaining personnel evacuated alongside British military forces, the British blockade of Palestine was lifted, and all those who had been Palestinian citizens ceased to be British protected persons, with Mandatory Palestine passports no longer giving British protection. The 1948 Palestinian expulsion and flight took place both before and after the end of the Mandate.

Over the next few days, approximately 700 Lebanese, 1,876 Syrian, 4,000 Iraqi, and 2,800 Egyptian troops crossed over the borders into Palestine, starting the 1948 Arab–Israeli War. Around 4,500 Transjordanian troops, commanded partly by 38 British officers who had resigned their commissions in the British Army only weeks earlier, including overall commander, General John Bagot Glubb, entered the corpus separatum region encompassing Jerusalem and its environs (in response to the Haganah's Operation Kilshon) and moved into areas designated as part of the Arab state by the UN partition plan. The war, which was to last until 1949, would see Israel expand to encompass about 78% of the territory of the former British Mandate, with Transjordan seizing and subsequently annexing the West Bank and the Kingdom of Egypt seizing the Gaza Strip. With the end of the Mandate, the remaining British troops in Israel were concentrated in an enclave in the Haifa port area, through which they were being withdrawn, and at RAF Ramat David, which was maintained to cover the withdrawal. The British handed over RAF Ramat David to the Israelis on 26 May and on 30 June, the last British troops were evacuated from Haifa. The British flag was lowered from the administrative building of the Port of Haifa and the Israeli flag was raised in its place, and the Haifa port area was formally handed over to the Israeli authorities in a ceremony.

== Politics ==
The administration of the Mandate was officially under British Government Service however, the Peel Commission noted that it was unreliable, understaffed, and over-centralised and that racial antagonism between Jews and Arabs had begun affecting the whole Administration. The Jewish Agency and the Arab Higher Committee representing the Jews and the Arabs respectively, had grown to be parallel governments themselves, a case of imperium in imperio.

=== Palestinian Arab community ===
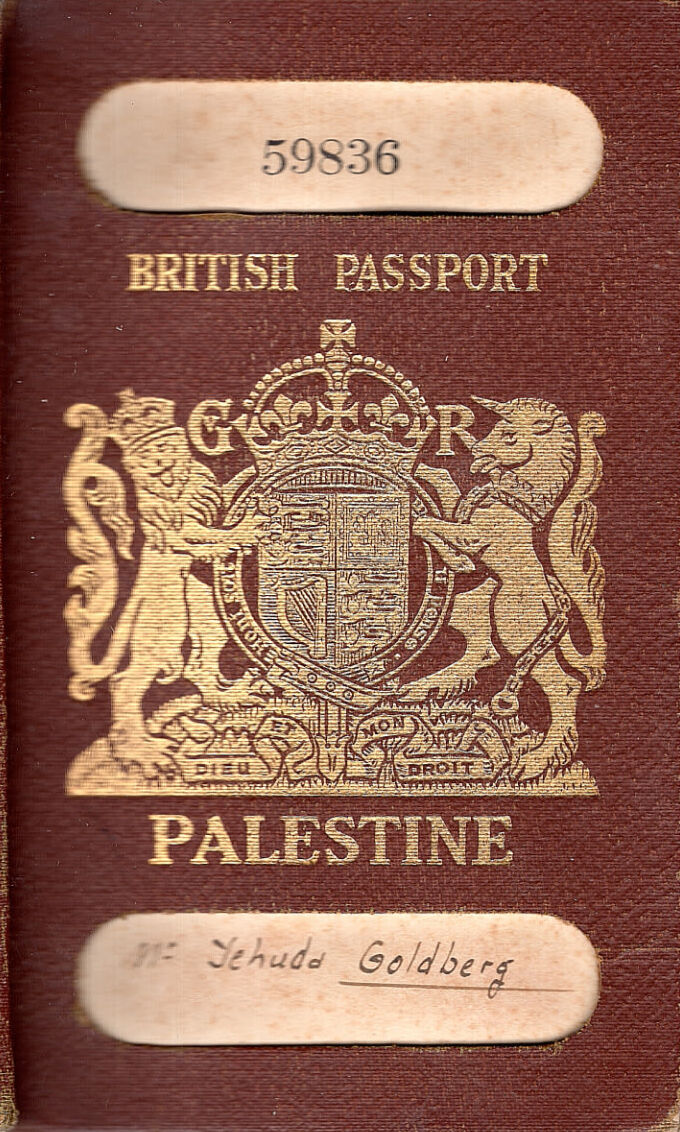
Front cover

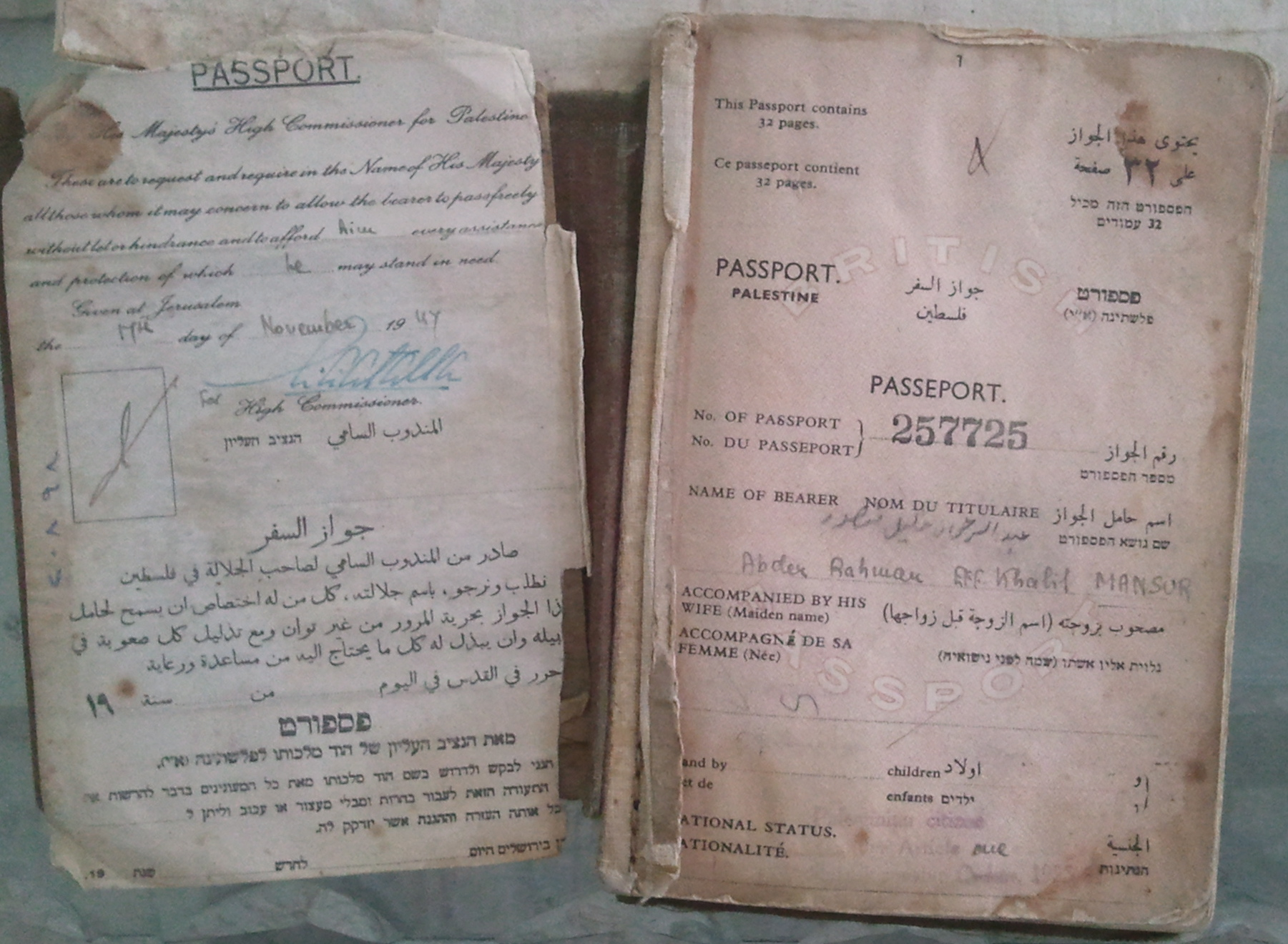
Biographical pages

Passports from the British Mandate era

The resolution of the San Remo Conference contained a safeguarding clause for the existing rights of the non-Jewish communities. The conference accepted the terms of the Mandate with reference to Palestine, on the understanding that there was inserted in the memorandum a legal undertaking by the Mandatory Power that it would not involve the surrender of the rights hitherto enjoyed by the non-Jewish communities in Palestine. The draft mandates for Mesopotamia and Palestine, and all of the post-war peace treaties, contained clauses for the protection of religious groups and minorities. The mandates invoked the compulsory jurisdiction of the Permanent Court of International Justice in the event of any disputes.

Article 62 (LXII) of the Treaty of Berlin, signed on 13 July 1878, dealt with religious freedom and civil and political rights in all parts of the Ottoman Empire. The guarantees have frequently been referred to as "religious rights" or "minority rights". However, the guarantees included a prohibition against discrimination in civil and political matters. Difference of religion could not be alleged against any person as a ground for exclusion or incapacity in matters relating to the enjoyment of civil or political rights, admission to public employments, functions, and honours, or the exercise of the various professions and industries, "in any locality whatsoever".

A legal analysis performed by the International Court of Justice (ICJ) noted that the Covenant of the League of Nations had provisionally recognised the communities of Palestine as independent nations. The mandate simply marked a transitory period, with the aim and object of leading the mandated territory to become an independent self-governing State. Judge Higgins explained that the Palestinian people are entitled to their territory, to exercise self-determination, and to have their own State." The Court said that specific guarantees regarding freedom of movement and access to the Holy Sites contained in the Treaty of Berlin (1878) had been preserved under the terms of the Palestine Mandate and a chapter of the United Nations Partition Plan for Palestine.

According to historian Rashid Khalidi, the mandate ignored the political rights of the Arabs. The Arab leadership repeatedly pressed the British to grant them national and political rights, such as representative government, over Jewish national and political rights in the remaining 23% of the Mandate of Palestine which the British had set aside for a Jewish homeland. The Arabs reminded the British of President Wilson's Fourteen Points and British promises during the First World War. The British, however, made acceptance of the terms of the mandate a precondition for any change in the constitutional position of the Arabs. A legislative council was proposed in the Palestine Order in Council of 1922, which implemented the terms of the mandate. It stated that: "No Ordinance shall be passed which shall be in any way repugnant to or inconsistent with the provisions of the Mandate." For the Arabs, this decree was unacceptable, akin to "self murder". As a result, the Arabs boycotted the elections to the Council held in 1923, which were subsequently annulled. During the interwar period, the British rejected the principle of majority rule or any other measure that would give Arabs control of the government.

The terms of the mandate required the establishment of self-governing institutions in both Palestine and Transjordan. In 1947, the Foreign Secretary, Ernest Bevin, admitted that, during the previous twenty-five years, the British had done their best to further the legitimate aspirations of the Jewish communities without prejudicing the interests of the Arabs, but had failed to "secure the development of self-governing institutions" in accordance with the terms of the Mandate.

==== Palestinian Arab leadership and national aspirations ====
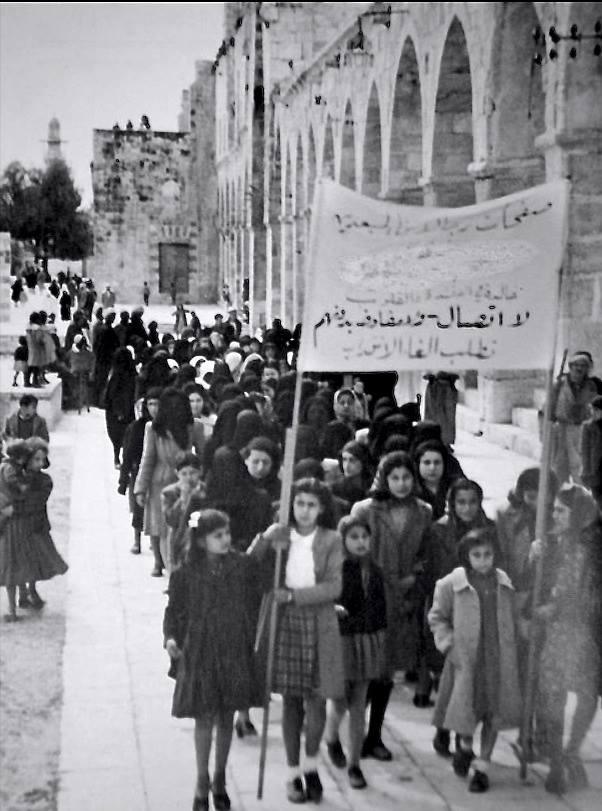
A 1930 protest in Jerusalem against the British Mandate by Arab women. The sign reads "No dialogue, no negotiations until termination of the Mandate."

Under the British Mandate, the office of "Mufti of Jerusalem", traditionally limited in authority and geographical scope, was refashioned into that of "Grand Mufti of Palestine". Furthermore, a Supreme Muslim Council (SMC) was established and given various duties, such as the administration of religious endowments and the appointment of religious judges and local muftis. In Ottoman times, these duties had been fulfilled by the Imperial bureaucracy in Constantinople (Istanbul). In dealings with the Palestinian Arabs, the British negotiated with the elite rather than the middle or lower classes. They chose Hajj Amin al-Husseini to become Grand Mufti, although he was young and had received the fewest votes from Jerusalem's Islamic leaders. One of the mufti's rivals, Raghib Bey al-Nashashibi, had already been appointed Mayor of Jerusalem in 1920, replacing Musa Kazim, whom the British removed after the Nabi Musa riots of 1920, during which he exhorted the crowd to give their blood for Palestine. During the entire Mandate period, but especially during the latter half, the rivalry between the mufti and al-Nashashibi dominated Palestinian politics. Khalidi ascribes the failure of the Palestinian leaders to enroll mass support to the fact that they had been part of the ruling elite and accustomed to their commands being obeyed; thus, the idea of mobilising the masses was unknown to them.

On the Husseini-Nashashibi rivalry, an editorial in the Arabic-language Falastin newspaper in the 1920s commented:

The spirit of factionalism has penetrated most levels of society; one can see it among journalists, trainees, and the rank and file. If you ask anyone: who does he support? He will reply with pride, Husseini or Nashasibi, or ... he will start to pour out his wrath against the opposing camp in a most repulsive manner.

There had already been rioting and attacks on and massacres of Jews in 1921 and 1929. During the 1930s, Palestinian Arab popular discontent with Jewish immigration grew. In the late 1920s and early 1930s, several factions of Palestinian society, especially from the younger generation, became impatient with the internecine divisions and ineffectiveness of the Palestinian elite and engaged in grass-roots anti-British and anti-Zionist activism, organised by groups such as the Young Men's Muslim Association. There was also support for the radical nationalist Independence Party (Hizb al-Istiqlal), which called for a boycott of the British in the manner of the Indian Congress Party. Some took to the hills to fight the British and the Jews. Most of these initiatives were contained and defeated by notables in the pay of the Mandatory Administration, particularly the mufti and his cousin Jamal al-Husseini. A six-month general strike in 1936 marked the start of the great Arab Revolt.

==== Palestinian Arab journalism ====
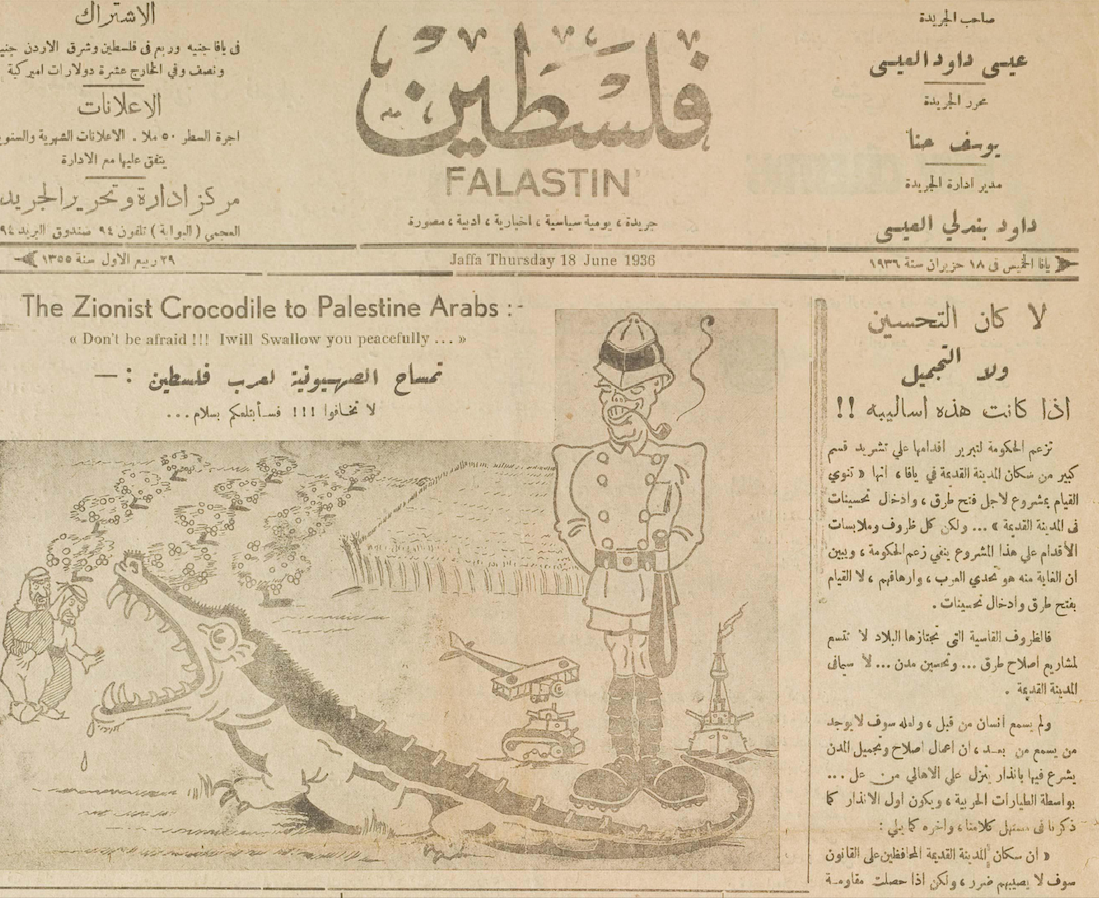
The Palestinian Arab Christian-owned Falastin newspaper featuring a caricature on its 18 June 1936 edition showing Zionism as a crocodile under the protection of a British officer telling Palestinian Arabs: "don't be afraid!!! I will swallow you peacefully...."

After the Palestinian Arab press during the Ottoman period had been suppressed due to the outbreak of World War I in 1914, only two of the three leading newspapers of the Ottoman era were reopened during the mandate period, Al-Karmil and Falastin. During this period, the press became more diverse, and increasingly reflected different political factions and national consciousness. According to one survey in the mid 1930s, over 250 Arabic newspapers and 65 in other languages were circulating in Mandatory Palestine. Twenty newspapers were established in Jerusalem, six in Jaffa, twelve in Haifa, and others in Bethlehem, Gaza and Tulkarem.

The Ottoman Press Law, which mandated licensing and the submission of translations to government authorities, was adopted by the British, but they rarely interfered until the 1929 Palestine riots, which saw violent confrontations between Arabs and Zionists, and led to a radicalization of Arab newspapers. One outspoken newspaper was established in Jaffa called Al-Difa' (The Defense) in 1934, which was associated with Hizb Al-Istiqlal (The Independence Party). Falastin and Al-Difa' became the two most prominent dailies during the mandate period, and a rivalry developed between the two, which led to improvements in their quality.

Many of the editors and owners of newspapers were members of political organizations, and used their publications for mobilizing the public. The British authorities' attitude towards Palestinian press was initially tolerant, given they had assessed that their impact on public life was minimal, but restrictive measures were soon increasingly introduced. A new Publications Law was issued in 1933, which gave the British authorities the power to revoke publication permits, suspend newspapers, and punish journalists. Regulations were issued that further restricted freedom of the press. Many major publications were suspended for extended periods between 1937 and 1938, including Falastin, Al-Difa, and Al-Liwa. After the outbreak of World War II, emergency laws were enacted and the British closed almost all the newspapers, with the exception of Falastin and Al-Difa, due to the moderation of their tone and the publishing of censored news.

=== Jewish community ===
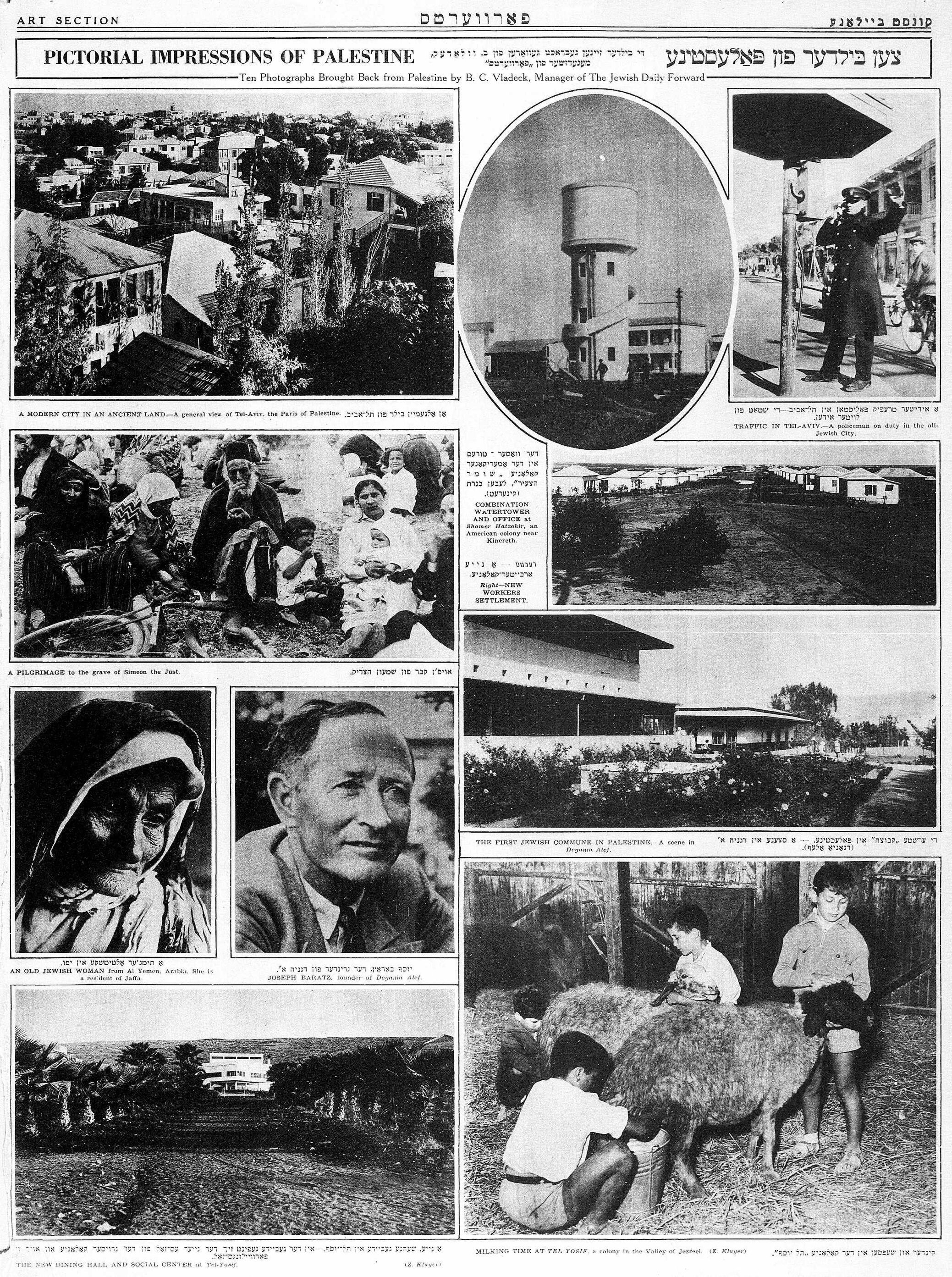
Scenes of Jewish life in Palestine, photographed by Zoltan Kluger and collected by Baruch Charney Vladeck, featured in The Jewish Daily Forward, 15 November 1936

The conquest of Ottoman Syria by British forces in 1917 found a mixed community in the region, with Palestine, the southern part of Ottoman Syria, containing a mixed population of Muslims, Christians, Jews and Druze. In this period, the Jewish community (Yishuv) in Palestine was composed of traditional Jewish communities in cities (the Old Yishuv), which had existed for centuries, and the newly established agricultural Zionist communities (the New Yishuv), established since the 1870s. With the establishment of the Mandate, the Jewish community in Palestine formed the Zionist Commission to represent its interests.

In 1929, the Jewish Agency for Palestine took over from the Zionist Commission its representative functions and administration of the Jewish community. During the Mandate period, the Jewish Agency was a quasi-governmental organisation that served the administrative needs of the Jewish community. Its leadership was elected by Jews from all over the world by proportional representation. The Jewish Agency was charged with facilitating Jewish immigration to Palestine, land purchase and planning the general policies of the Zionist leadership. It ran schools and hospitals and formed the Haganah. The British authorities offered to create a similar Arab Agency but this offer was rejected by Arab leaders.

In response to numerous Arab attacks on Jewish communities, the Haganah, a Jewish paramilitary organisation, was formed on 15 June 1920 to defend Jewish residents. Tensions led to widespread violent disturbances on several occasions, notably in 1921 (see Jaffa riots), 1929 (primarily violent attacks by Arabs on Jews – see 1929 Hebron massacre) and 1936–1939. Beginning in 1936, Jewish groups such as Etzel (Irgun) and Lehi (Stern Gang) conducted campaigns of violence against British military and Arab targets.

==== Jewish immigration ====
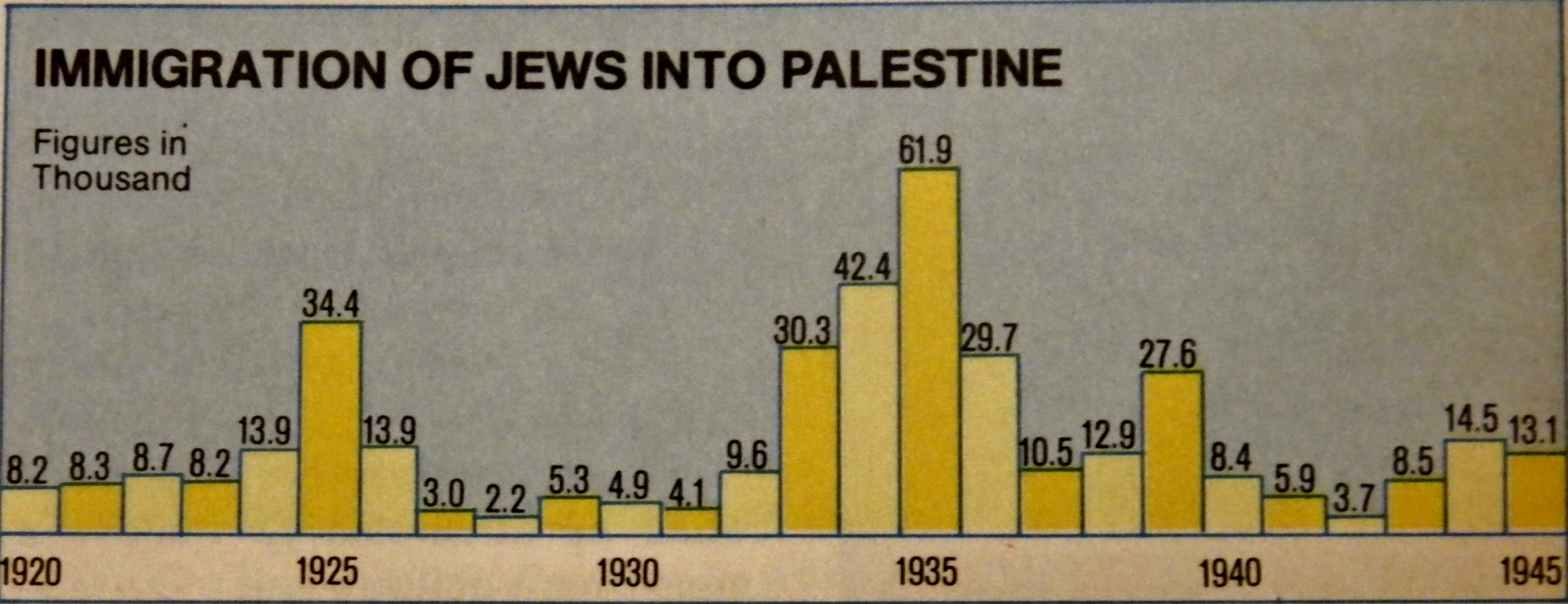
Jewish immigration to Mandatory Palestine from 1920 to 1945

During the Mandate, the Yishuv grew from one-sixth to almost one-third of the population. According to official records, 367,845 Jews and 33,304 non-Jews immigrated legally between 1920 and 1945. It was estimated that another 50,000–60,000 Jews and a marginal number of Arabs, the latter mostly on a seasonal basis, immigrated illegally during this period. Immigration accounted for most of the increase of Jewish population, while the non-Jewish population increase was largely natural. Of the Jewish immigrants, in 1939 most had come from Germany and Czechoslovakia, but in 1940–1944 most came from Romania and Poland, with an additional 3,530 immigrants arriving from Yemen during the same period.

Initially, Jewish immigration to Palestine met little opposition from the Palestinian Arabs. However, as antisemitism grew in Europe during the late 19th and early 20th centuries, Jewish immigration (mostly from Europe) to Palestine began to increase markedly. Combined with the growth of Arab nationalism in the region and increasing anti-Jewish sentiments the growth of the Jewish population created much Arab resentment. The British government placed limitations on Jewish immigration to Palestine. These quotas were controversial, particularly in the latter years of British rule, and both Arabs and Jews disliked the policy, each for their own reasons.

Jewish immigrants were to be afforded Palestinian citizenship:

Article 7. The Administration of Palestine shall be responsible for enacting a nationality law. There shall be included in this law provisions framed so as to facilitate the acquisition of Palestinian citizenship by Jews who take up their permanent residence in Palestine.

Alongside Jewish immigration and colonization, Arab rural settlement expanded significantly. Historical geography research demonstrates that Palestinian villagers reclaimed forested areas and marginal lands, establishing new hamlets and intensifying cultivation.

==== Jewish national home ====
In 1919, the general secretary (and future President) of the Zionist Organisation, Nahum Sokolow, published History of Zionism (1600–1918). He also represented the Zionist Organisation at the Paris Peace Conference.

Nahum Sokolow, History of Zionism

One of the objectives of British administration was to give effect to the Balfour Declaration, which was also set out in the preamble of the mandate, as follows:

Whereas the Principal Allied Powers have also agreed that the Mandatory should be responsible for putting into effect the declaration originally made on November 2nd, 1917, by the Government of His Britannic Majesty, and adopted by the said Powers, in favour of the establishment in Palestine of a national home for the Jewish people, it being clearly understood that nothing should be done which might prejudice the civil and religious rights of existing non-Jewish communities in Palestine, or the rights and political status enjoyed by Jews in any other country.

The United Nations Special Committee on Palestine said the Jewish National Home, which derived from the formulation of Zionist aspirations in the 1897 Basle program has provoked many discussions concerning its meaning, scope and legal character, especially since it had no known legal connotation and there are no precedents in international law for its interpretation. It was used in the Balfour Declaration and in the Mandate, both of which promised the establishment of a "Jewish National Home" without, however, defining its meaning. A statement on "British Policy in Palestine", issued on 3 June 1922 by the Colonial Office, placed a restrictive construction upon the Balfour Declaration. The statement said the British government did not contemplate "the disappearance or subordination of the Arabic population, language or customs in Palestine" or "the imposition of Jewish nationality upon the inhabitants of Palestine as a whole", and made it clear that in the eyes of the mandatory Power, the Jewish National Home was to be founded in Palestine and not that Palestine as a whole was to be converted into a Jewish National Home. The Committee noted that the construction, which restricted considerably the scope of the National Home, was made prior to the confirmation of the Mandate by the Council of the League of Nations and was formally accepted at the time by the Executive of the Zionist Organisation.

In March 1930, Lord Passfield, the Secretary of State for the Colonies, had written a Cabinet Paper which said:

In the Balfour Declaration there is no suggestion that the Jews should be accorded a special or favoured position in Palestine as compared with the Arab inhabitants of the country, or that the claims of Palestinians to enjoy self-government (subject to the rendering of administrative advice and assistance by a Mandatory as foreshadowed in Article XXII of the Covenant) should be curtailed in order to facilitate the establishment in Palestine of a National Home for the Jewish people." ... Zionist leaders have not concealed and do not conceal their opposition to the grant of any measure of self-government to the people of Palestine either now or for many years to come. Some of them even go so far as to claim that that provision of Article 2 of the Mandate constitutes a bar to compliance with the demand of the Arabs for any measure of self-government. In view of the provisions of Article XXII of the Covenant and of the promises made to the Arabs on several occasions that claim is inadmissible.

The League of Nations Permanent Mandates Commission took the position that the Mandate contained a dual obligation. In 1932 the Mandates Commission questioned the representative of the Mandatory on the demands made by the Arab population regarding the establishment of self-governing institutions, in accordance with various articles of the mandate, and in particular Article 2. The chairman noted that "under the terms of the same article, the mandatory Power had long since set up the Jewish National Home".

In 1937, the Peel Commission, a British Royal Commission headed by Earl Peel, proposed solving the Arab–Jewish conflict by partitioning Palestine into two states. The two main Jewish leaders, Chaim Weizmann and David Ben-Gurion, had convinced the Zionist Congress to approve equivocally the Peel recommendations as a basis for more negotiation. The US Consul General at Jerusalem told the State Department that the Mufti had refused the principle of partition and declined to consider it. The Consul said that the Emir Abdullah urged acceptance on the ground that realities must be faced, but wanted modification of the proposed boundaries and Arab administrations in the neutral enclave. The Consul also noted that Nashashibi sidestepped the principle, but was willing to negotiate for favourable modifications.

A collection of private correspondence published by David Ben Gurion contained a letter written in 1937 which explained that he was in favour of partition because he did not envision a partial Jewish state as the end of the process. Ben Gurion wrote "What we want is not that the country be united and whole, but that the united and whole country be Jewish." He explained that a first-class Jewish army would permit Zionists to settle in the rest of the country with or without the consent of the Arabs. Benny Morris said that both Chaim Weizmann and David Ben Gurion saw partition as a stepping stone to further expansion and the eventual takeover of the whole of Palestine. Former Israeli Foreign Minister and historian Schlomo Ben Ami writes that 1937 was the same year that the "Field Battalions" under Yitzhak Sadeh wrote the "Avner Plan", which anticipated and laid the groundwork for what would become in 1948, Plan D. It envisioned going far beyond any boundaries contained in the existing partition proposals and planned the conquest of the Galilee, the West Bank, and Jerusalem.

In 1942, the Biltmore Program was adopted as the platform of the World Zionist Organisation. It demanded "that Palestine be established as a Jewish Commonwealth".

In 1946 an Anglo-American Committee of Inquiry noted that the demand for a Jewish State went beyond the obligations of either the Balfour Declaration or the Mandate and had been expressly disowned by the Chairman of the Jewish Agency as recently as 1932. The Jewish Agency subsequently refused to accept the subsequent Morrison-Grady Plan as the basis for discussion. A spokesman for the agency, Eliahu Epstein, told the US State Department that the Agency could not attend the London conference if the Grady-Morrison proposal was on the agenda. He stated that the Agency was unwilling to be placed in a position where it might have to compromise between the Grady-Morrison proposals on the one hand and its own partition plan on the other. He stated that the Agency had accepted partition as the solution for Palestine which it favoured.

=== Land ownership ===
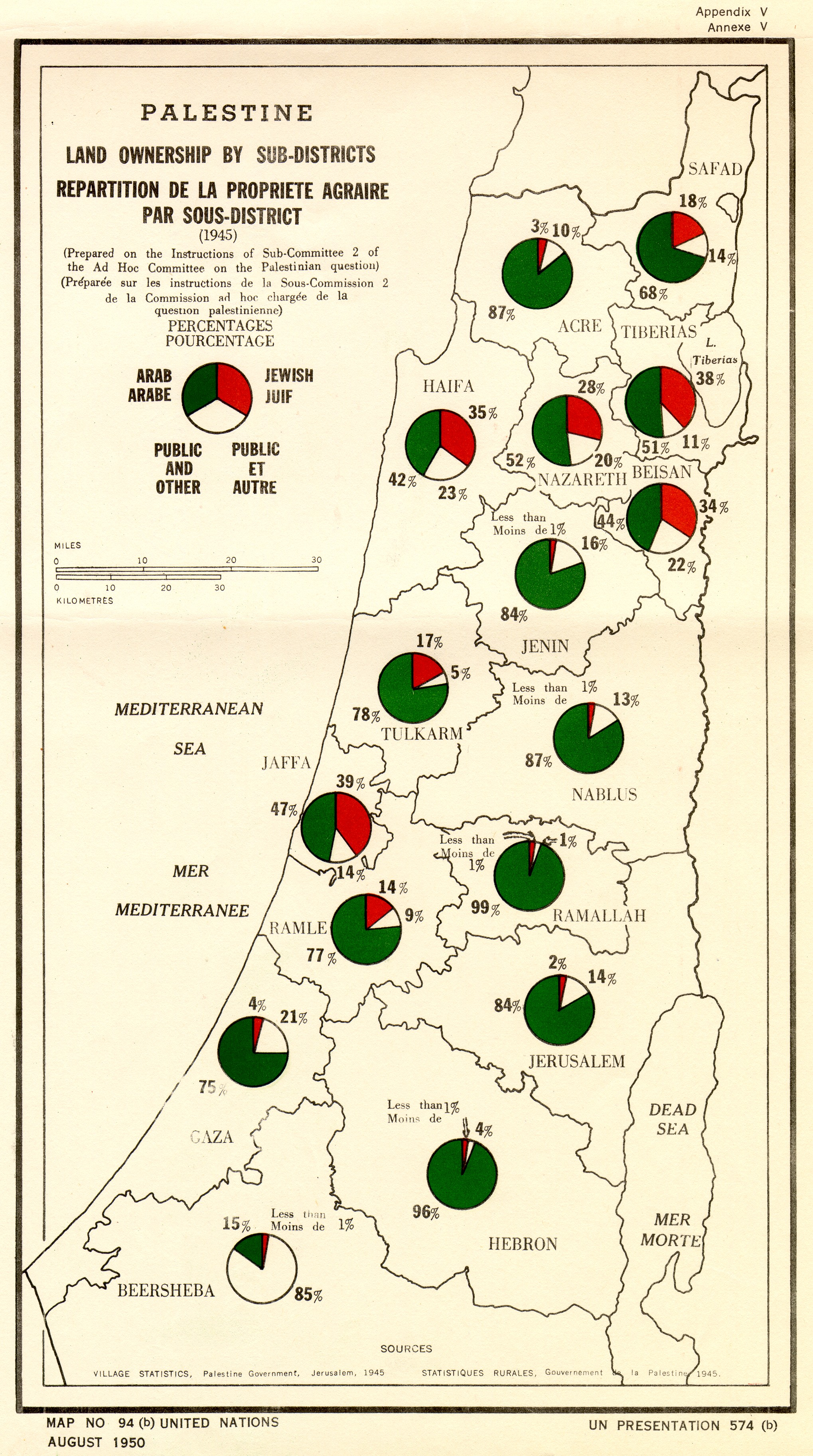
Map of Palestinian land ownership by sub-district (1945) originally published in the Village Statistics, 1945

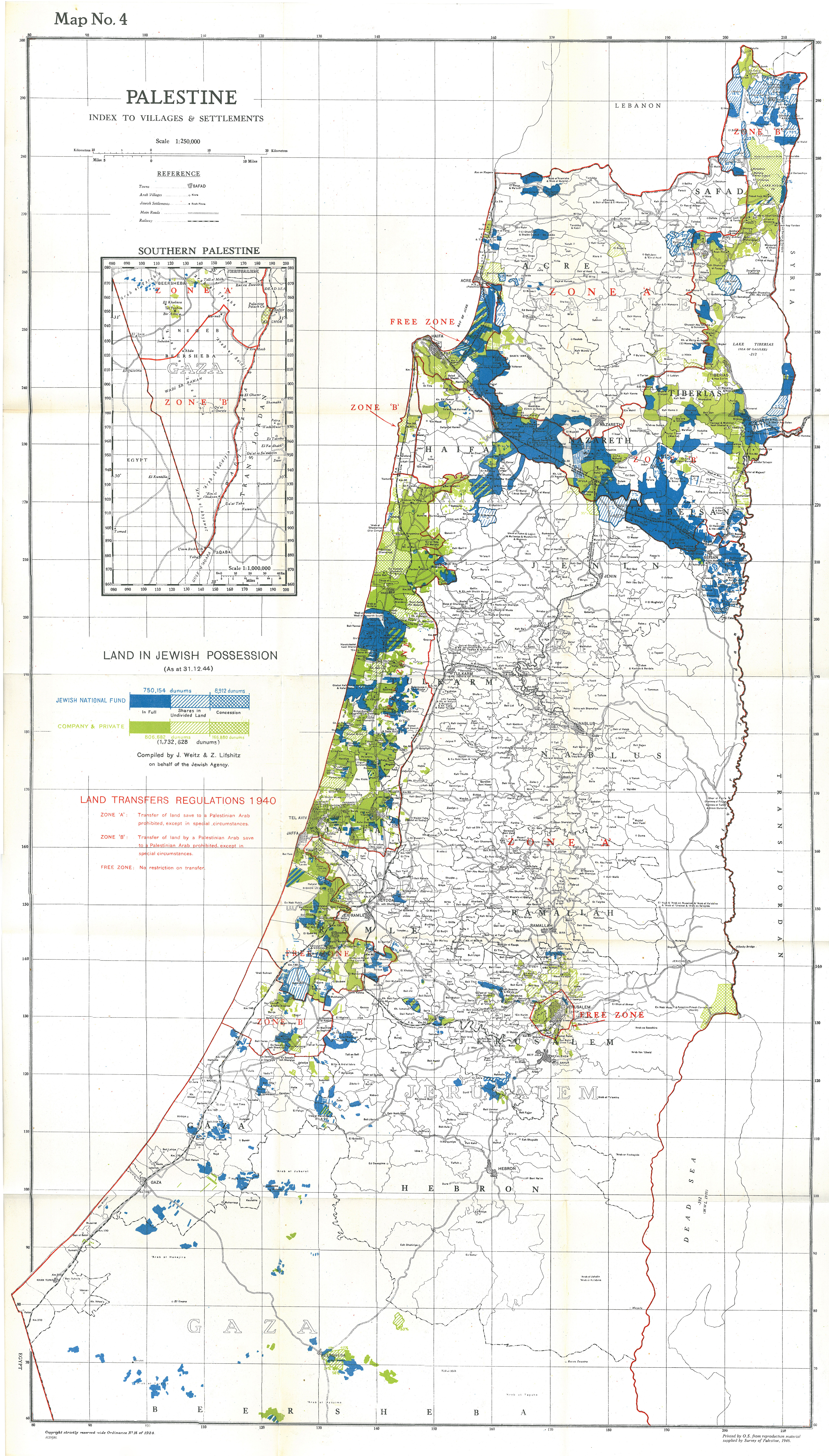
Palestinian index of villages and settlements, showing land in Jewish possession as of 31 December 1944

After transition to the British rule, much of the agricultural land in Palestine (about one third of the whole territory) was still owned by the same landowners as under Ottoman rule, mostly powerful Arab clans and local Muslim sheikhs. Other lands had been held by foreign Christian organisations (most notably the Greek Orthodox Church), as well as Jewish private and Zionist organisations, and to lesser degree by small minorities of Baháʼís, Samaritans and Circassians.

As of 1931, the territory of the British Mandate of Palestine was 26,625,600 dunams (26,625.6 km^{2}), of which 8,252,900 dunams (8,252.9 km^{2}) or 33% were arable. Official statistics show that Jews privately and collectively owned 1,393,531 dunams (1,393.53 km^{2}), or 5.23% of Palestine's total in 1945. The Jewish owned agricultural land was largely located in the Galilee and along the coastal plain. Estimates of the total volume of land that Jews had purchased by 15 May 1948 are complicated by illegal and unregistered land transfers, as well as by the lack of data on land concessions from the Palestine administration after 31 March 1936. According to Avneri, Jews held 1,850,000 dunams (1,850 km^{2}) of land in 1947, or 6.94% of the total. Stein gives the estimate of 2,000,000 dunams (2,000 km^{2}) as of May 1948, or 7.51% of the total. According to Fischbach, by 1948, Jews and Jewish companies owned 20% percent of all cultivable land in the country.

According to Clifford A. Wright, by the end of the British Mandate period in 1948, Jewish farmers cultivated 425,450 dunams of land, while Palestinian farmers had 5,484,700 dunams of land under cultivation. The 1945 UN estimate shows that Arab ownership of arable land was on average 68% of a district, ranging from 15% ownership in the Beer-Sheba district to 99% ownership in the Ramallah district. These data cannot be fully understood without comparing them to those of neighbouring countries: in Iraq, for instance, still in 1951 only 0.3 per cent of registered land (or 50 per cent of the total amount) was categorised as 'private property'.

==== Land ownership by district ====
The following table shows the 1945 land ownership of Mandatory Palestine by district:

Land ownership of Palestine in 1945 by district
District	Sub-district	Arab-owned	Jewish-owned	Public / other
Haifa	Haifa	42%	35%	23%
Galilee	Acre	87%	3%	10%
Galilee	Beisan	44%	34%	22%
Galilee	Nazareth	52%	28%	20%
Galilee	Safad	68%	18%	14%
Galilee	Tiberias	51%	38%	11%
Lydda	Jaffa	47%	39%	14%
Lydda	Ramle	77%	14%	9%
Samaria	Jenin	84%	<1%	16%
Samaria	Nablus	87%	<1%	13%
Samaria	Tulkarm	78%	17%	5%
Jerusalem	Hebron	96%	<1%	4%
Jerusalem	Jerusalem	84%	2%	14%
Jerusalem	Ramallah	99%	<1%	1%
Gaza	Beersheba	15%	<1%	85%
Gaza	Gaza	75%	4%	21%
Data from the Land Ownership of Palestine

==== Land ownership by corporation ====
The table below shows the land ownership of Palestine by large Jewish Corporations (in square kilometres) on 31 December 1945.

Land ownership of Palestine by large Jewish Corporations (in square kilometres) on 31 December 1945
Corporations	Area
JNF	660.10
PICA	193.70
Palestine Land Development Co. Ltd.	9.70
Hemnuta Ltd	16.50
Africa Palestine Investment Co. Ltd.	9.90
Bayside Land Corporation Ltd.	8.50
Palestine Kupat Am. Bank Ltd.	8.40
Total	906.80
Data is from Survey of Palestine (vol. I, p. 245).

==== Land ownership by type ====
The land was either owned privately and collectively by Jews, Arabs and others or belonged to the government domain which included approximately one half of the total territory of Mandatory Palestine. It was classified as urban, rural built-on, cultivable (farmed), and uncultivable in the Survey of Palestine (1946).

Land ownership of Palestine (in square kilometres) on 1 April 1943
Category	Arab / non-Jewish ownership	Jewish ownership	Total
Urban	76.66	70.11	146.77
Rural built-on	36.85	42.33	79.18
Cereal (taxable)	5,503.18	814.10	6,317.29
Cereal (not taxable)	900.29	51.05	951.34
Plantation	1,079.79	95.51	1,175.30
Citrus	145.57	141.19	286.76
Banana	2.30	1.43	3.73
Uncultivable	16,925.81	298.52	17,224.33
Total	24,670.46	1,514.25	26,184.70
Data is from Survey of Palestine (vol. II, p. 566). By the end of 1946, Jewish ownership had increased to 1624 km^{2}. The Arab / non-Jewish ownership includes government-owned land.

==== List of Mandatory land laws ====
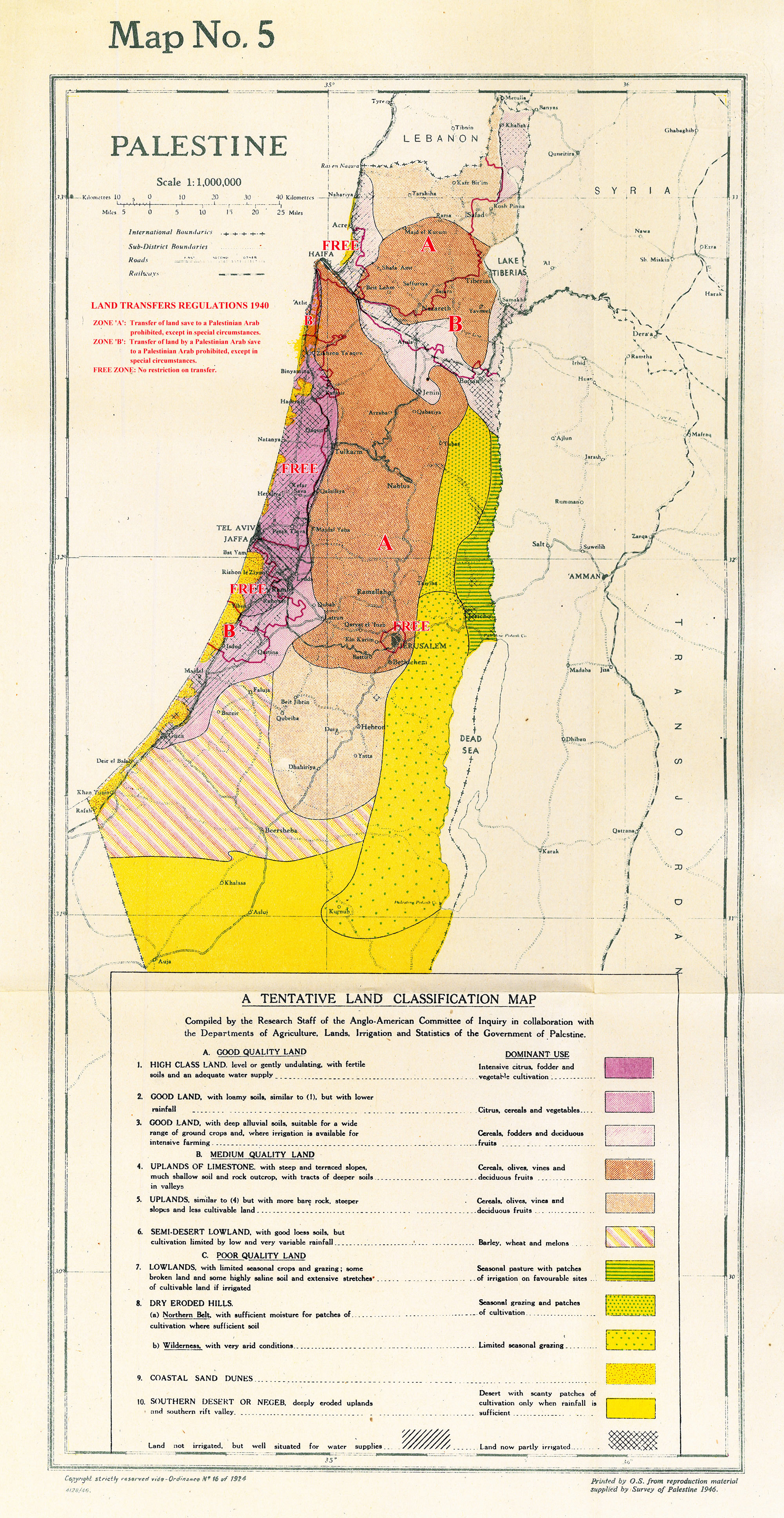
Land classification as prescribed in 1940

- Land Transfer Ordinance of 1920
- 1926 Correction of Land Registers Ordinance
- Land Settlement Ordinance of 1928
- Land Transfer Regulations of 1940

In February 1940, the British Government of Palestine promulgated the Land Transfer Regulations which divided Palestine into three regions with different restrictions on land sales applying to each. In Zone "A", which included the hill-country of Judea as a whole, certain areas in the Jaffa sub-District, and in the Gaza District, and the northern part of the Beersheba sub-District, new agreements for sale of land other than to a Palestinian Arab were forbidden without the High Commissioner's permission. In Zone "B", which included the Jezreel Valley, eastern Galilee, a parcel of coastal plain south of Haifa, a region northeast of the Gaza District, and the southern part of the Beersheba sub-District, sale of land by a Palestinian Arab was forbidden except to a Palestinian Arab with similar exceptions. In the "free zone", which consisted of Haifa Bay, the coastal plain from Zikhron Ya'akov to Yibna, and the neighborhood of Jerusalem, there were no restrictions. The reason given for the regulations was that the Mandatory was required to "ensur[e] that the rights and positions of other sections of the population are not prejudiced", and an assertion that "such transfers of land must be restricted if Arab cultivators are to maintain their existing standard of life and a considerable landless Arab population is not soon to be created"

== Demographics ==
=== British censuses and estimations ===
Religion in Mandatory Palestine (1922 census)
1. Muslims (78.3%)
2. Jews (11.1%)
3. Christians (9.50%)
4. Other religions (1.01%)

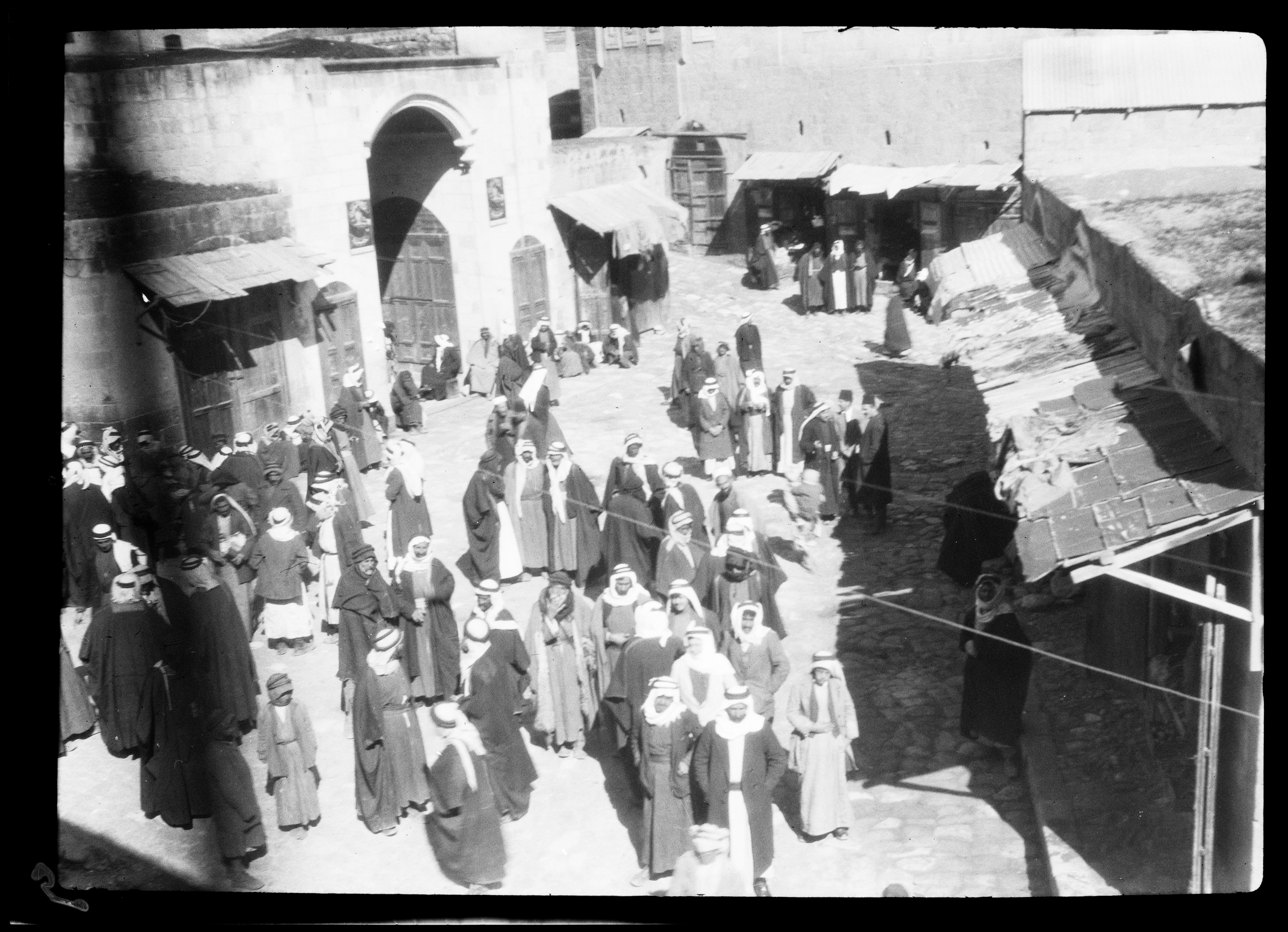
Street in As-Salt in the 1920s

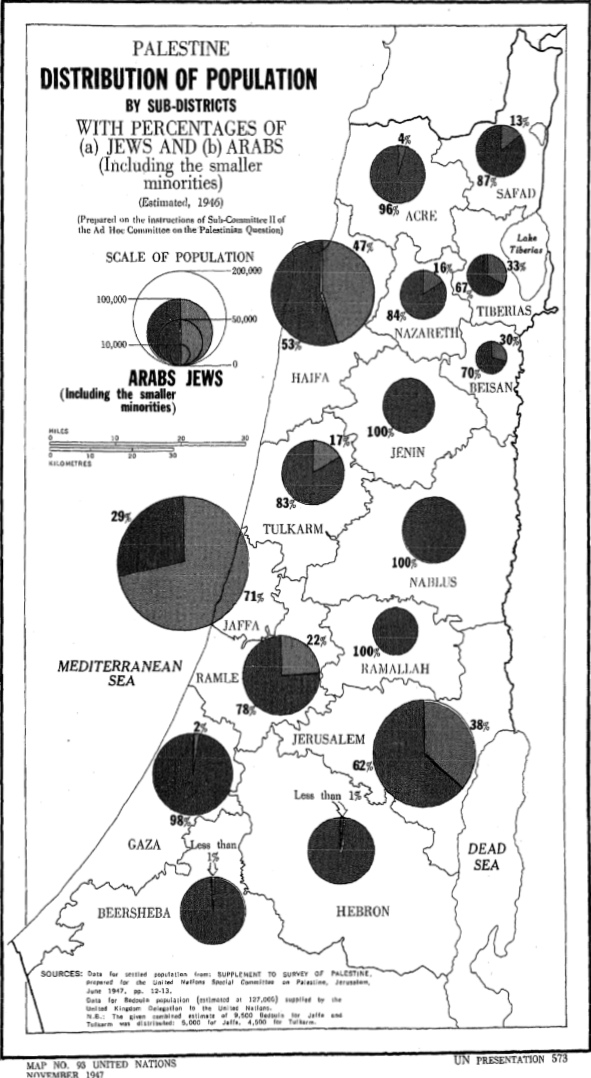
Population distribution near the end of the Mandate

In 1920, the majority of the approximately 750,000 people in this multi-ethnic region were Arabic-speaking Muslims, including a Bedouin population (estimated at 103,331 at the time of the 1922 census and concentrated in the Beersheba area and the region south and east of it), as well as Jews (who accounted for some 11% of the total) and smaller groups of Druze, Syrians, Sudanese, Somalis, Circassians, Egyptians, Copts, Greeks, and Hejazi Arabs:

- The first census of 1922 showed a population of 757,182, of whom 78% were Muslim, 11% Jewish and 10% Christian.
- The second census, of 1931, gave a total population of 1,035,154 of whom 73.4% were Muslim, 16.9% Jewish and 8.6% Christian.

A discrepancy between the two censuses and records of births, deaths and immigration, led the authors of the second census to postulate the illegal immigration of about 9,000 Jews and 4,000 Arabs during the intervening years.

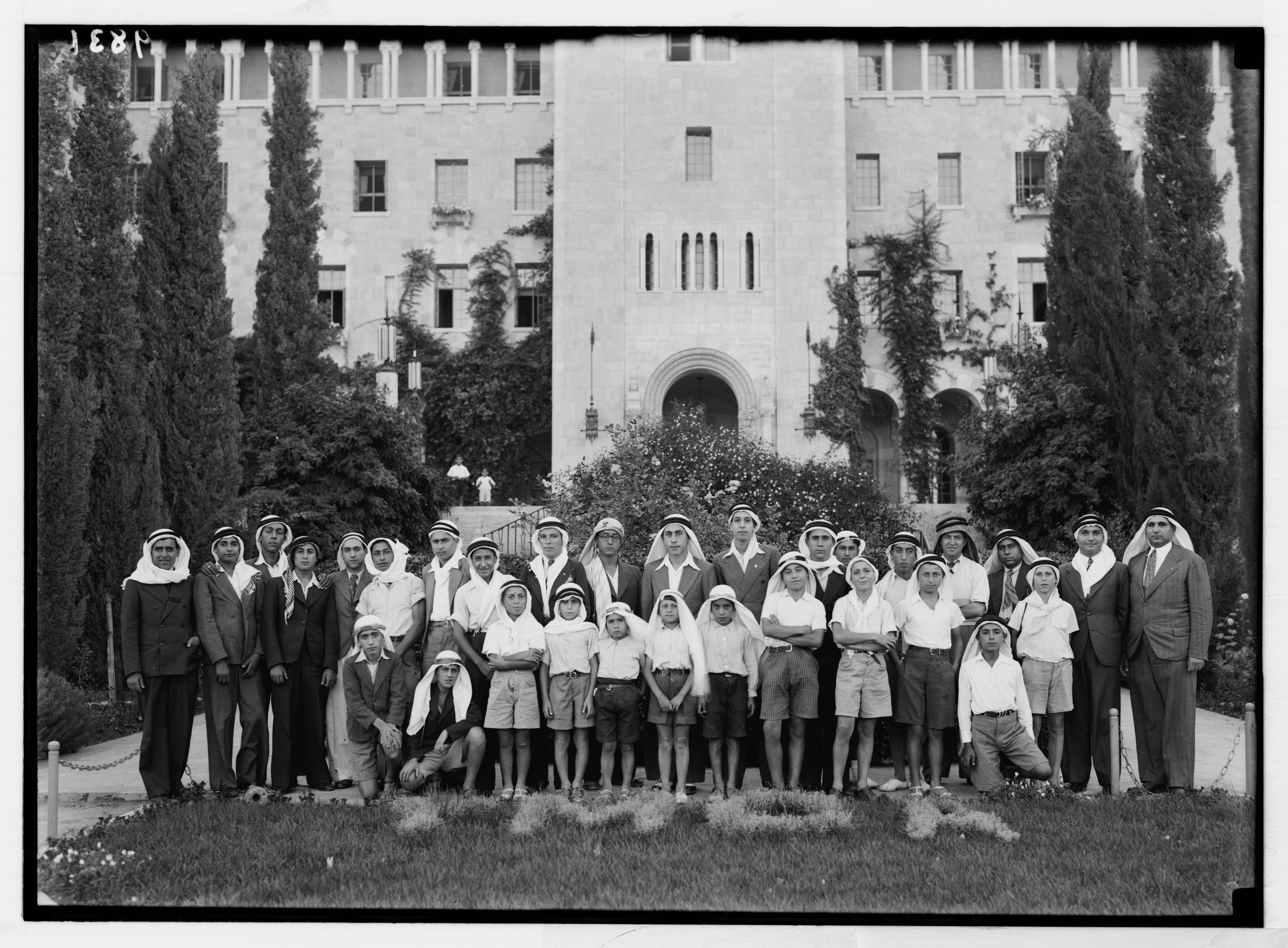
Arab Christian Palestinian boys at the Jerusalem YMCA, 1938

There were no further censuses but statistics were maintained by counting births, deaths and migration. By the end of 1936 the total population was approximately 1,300,000, the Jews being estimated at 384,000. The Arabs had also increased their numbers rapidly, mainly as a result of the cessation of the military conscription imposed on the country by the Ottoman Empire, the campaign against malaria and a general improvement in health services. In absolute figures their increase exceeded that of the Jewish population, but proportionally, the latter had risen from 13 per cent of the total population at the census of 1922 to nearly 30 per cent at the end of 1936.

Some components such as illegal immigration could only be estimated approximately. The White Paper of 1939, which placed immigration restrictions on Jews, stated that the Jewish population "has risen to some 450,000" and was "approaching a third of the entire population of the country". In 1945, a demographic study showed that the population had grown to 1,764,520, comprising 1,061,270 Muslims, 553,600 Jews, 135,550 Christians and 14,100 people of other groups.

Year	Total	Muslim	Jewish	Christian	Other
1922	752,048	589,177 (78%)	83,790 (11%)	71,464 (10%)	7,617 (1%)
1931	1,036,339	761,922 (74%)	175,138 (17%)	89,134 (9%)	10,145 (1%)
1945	1,764,520	1,061,270 (60%)	553,600 (31%)	135,550 (8%)	14,100 (1%)
Average compounded population growth rate per annum, 1922–1945	3.8%	2.6%	8.6%	2.8%	2.7%

=== By district ===
Map of the municipalities in Mandatory Palestine by population count (1945) 150,000 and more 100,000 50,000 20,000 10,000 5,000 2,000 1,000 500 less than 500 Nomadic regions in the Negev desert

The following table gives the religious demography of each of the 16 districts of the Mandate in 1945.

Demography of Palestine in 1945 by district
District	Sub-District	Muslim		Jewish		Christian		Total
District	Sub-District	Number	%	Number	%	Number	%	Total
Haifa	Haifa	95,970	38%	119,020	47%	33,710	13%	253,450
Galilee	Acre	51,130	69%	3,030	4%	11,800	16%	73,600
Galilee	Beisan	16,660	67%	7,590	30%	680	3%	24,950
Galilee	Nazareth	30,160	60%	7,980	16%	11,770	24%	49,910
Galilee	Safad	47,310	83%	7,170	13%	1,630	3%	56,970
Galilee	Tiberias	23,940	58%	13,640	33%	2,470	6%	41,470
Lydda	Jaffa	95,980	24%	295,160	72%	17,790	4%	409,290
Lydda	Ramle	95,590	71%	31,590	24%	5,840	4%	134,030
Samaria	Jenin	60,000	98%	negligible	<1%	1,210	2%	61,210
Samaria	Nablus	92,810	98%	negligible	<1%	1,560	2%	94,600
Samaria	Tulkarm	76,460	82%	16,180	17%	380	1%	93,220
Jerusalem	Hebron	92,640	99%	300	<1%	170	<1%	93,120
Jerusalem	Jerusalem	104,460	41%	102,520	40%	46,130	18%	253,270
Jerusalem	Ramallah	40,520	83%	negligible	<1%	8,410	17%	48,930
Gaza	Beersheba	6,270	90%	510	7%	210	3%	7,000
Gaza	Gaza	145,700	97%	3,540	2%	1,300	1%	150,540
Total		1,076,780	58%	608,230	33%	145,060	9%	1,845,560

=== Urban areas ===
The table below shows the population of the municipal areas of Palestine in 1922, at the start of the mandate period, per the 1922 census of Palestine.

Municipality	Muslims	Jews	Christians	Druze	Samaritans	Baha'is	Metawilehs	Hindus	Sikhs	TOTAL
Jerusalem	13413	33971	14699	6	0	0	0	484	5	62578
Jaffa	20699	20152	6850	0	8	0	0	0	0	47709
Haifa	9377	6230	8863	12	0	152	0	0	0	24634
Gaza	16722	54	701	0	0	0	3	0	0	17480
Hebron	16074	430	73	0	0	0	0	0	0	16577
Nablus	15238	16	544	2	147	0	0	0	0	15947
Safad	5431	2986	343	1	0	0	0	0	0	8761
Lydda	7166	11	926	0	0	0	0	0	0	8103
Nazareth	2486	53	4885	0	0	0	0	0	0	7424
Ramleh	5837	35	1440	0	0	0	0	0	0	7312
Tiberias	2096	4427	422	1	0	4	0	0	0	6950
Bethlehem	818	2	5838	0	0	0	0	0	0	6658
Acre	4883	78	1344	13	0	102	0	0	0	6420
Majdal	5064	0	33	0	0	0	0	0	0	5097
Khan Yunis	3866	1	23	0	0	0	0	0	0	3890
Tulkarem	3109	23	208	1	8	1	0	0	0	3350
Ramallah	125	7	2972	0	0	0	0	0	0	3104
Beit Jala	41	0	3060	0	0	0	0	0	0	3101
Jenin	2307	7	108	0	0	0	0	212	3	2637
Beersheba	2012	98	235	11	0	0	0	0	0	2356
Shefa-Amr	623	0	1263	402	0	0	0	0	0	2288
Beisan	1687	41	213	0	0	0	0	0	0	1941
TOTAL	139074	68622	55043	449	163	259	3	696	8	264317

== Government and institutions ==
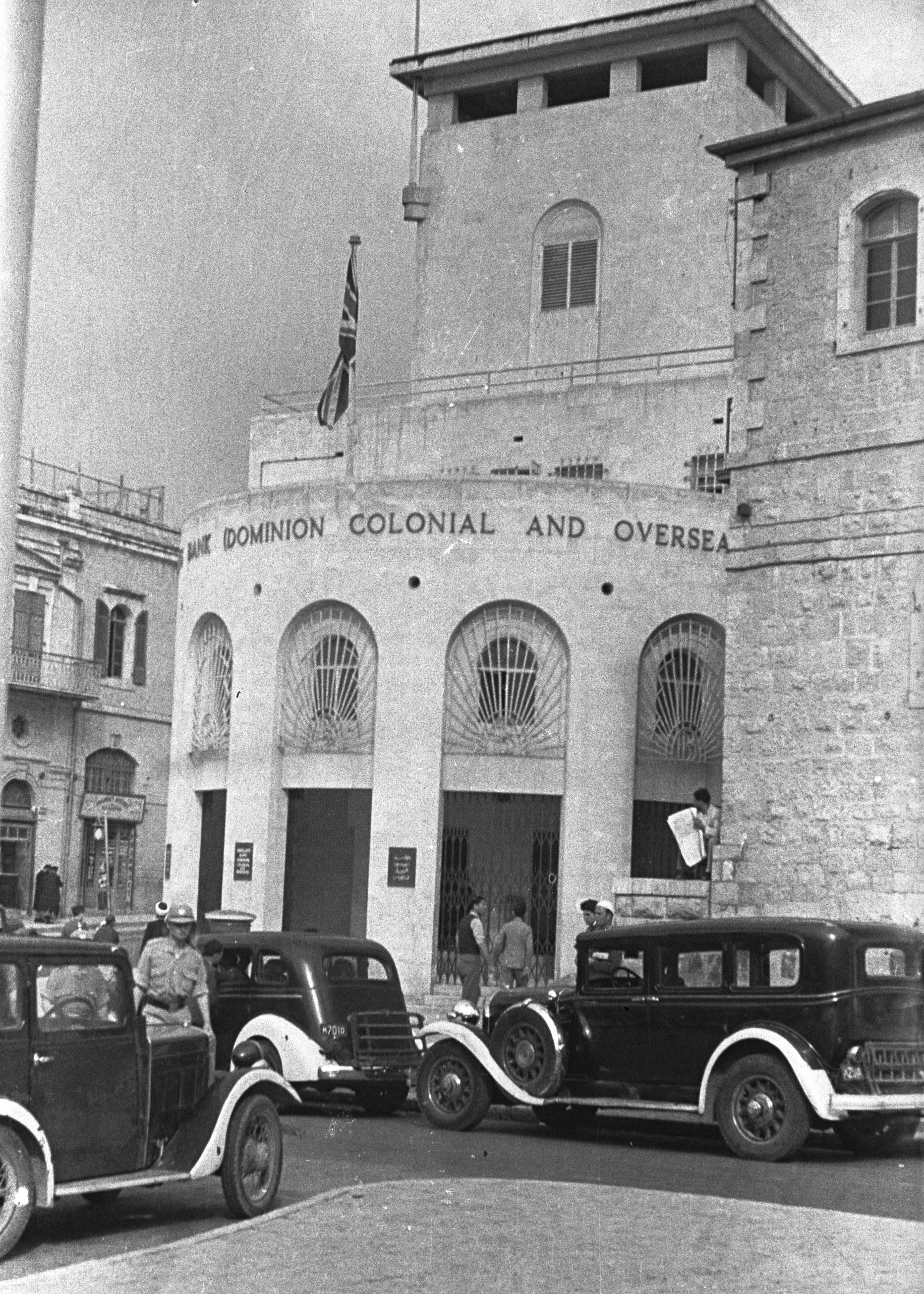
Jerusalem City Hall, 1939

Under the terms of the August 1922 Palestine Order in Council, the Mandate territory was divided into administrative regions known as districts and were administered by the office of the British High Commissioner for Palestine.

Britain continued the millet system of the Ottoman Empire whereby all matters of a religious nature and personal status were within the jurisdiction of Muslim courts and the courts of other recognised religions, called confessional communities. The High Commissioner established the Orthodox Rabbinate and retained a modified millet system which only recognised eleven religious communities: Muslims, Jews and nine Christian denominations (none of which were Christian Protestant churches). All those who were not members of these recognised communities were excluded from the millet arrangement. As a result, there was no possibility, for example, of marriages between confessional communities, and there were no civil marriages. Personal contacts between communities were nominal.

Apart from the Religious Courts, the judicial system was modelled on the British one, having a High Court with appellate jurisdiction and the power of review over the Central Court and the Central Criminal Court. The five consecutive Chief Justices were:

- Sir Thomas Haycraft (1921–1927)
- Sir Michael McDonnell (1927–1936)
- Sir Harry Trusted (1936–1941; knighted in 1938) (afterwards Chief Justice of the Federated Malay States, 1941)
- Frederic Gordon Smith (1941–1944)
- Sir William Fitzgerald (1944–1948)

The local newspaper The Palestine Post was founded in 1932 by Gershon Agron. In 1950, its name was changed to The Jerusalem Post. In 1923, Pinhas Rutenberg founded the Palestine Electric Company (to become the Israel Electric Corporation in 1961).

== Economy ==
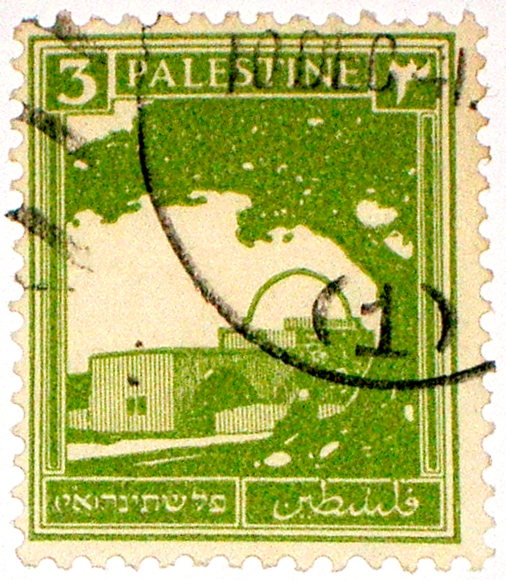
1927 Mandatory Palestine postage stamp

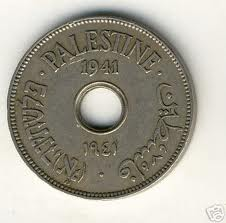
1941 Mandatory Palestine coin

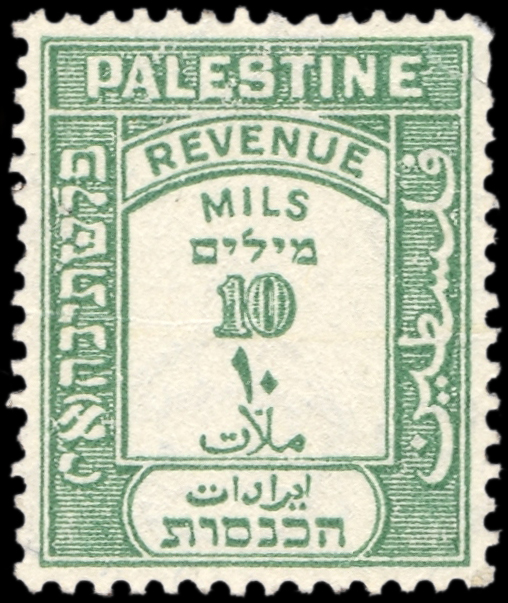
1927 Mandatory Palestine revenue stamp

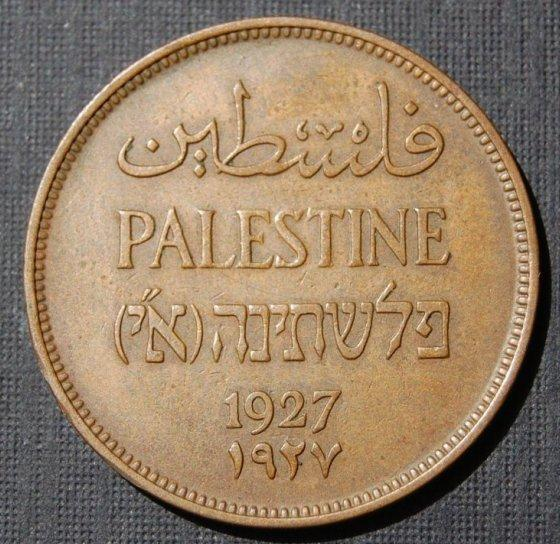
1927 Mandatory Palestine coin

"Palestine" is shown in English, Arabic (فلسطين) and Hebrew; the latter includes the acronym א״י for Eretz Yisrael (Land of Israel).

Palestine's economy during the British Mandate period was primarily agricultural, with most of the population living in the countryside.

Between 1922 and 1947, the annual growth rate of the Jewish sector of the economy was 13.2%, mainly due to immigration and foreign capital, while that of the Arab was 6.5%. Per capita, these figures were 4.8% and 3.6% respectively. By 1936, Jews earned 2.6 times as much as Arabs. Compared to Arabs in other countries, Palestinian Arabs earned slightly more.

The Jaffa Electric Company was founded in 1923 by Pinhas Rutenberg, and was later absorbed into a newly created Palestine Electric Corporation; the First Jordan Hydro-Electric Power House was opened in 1933. Palestine Airways was founded in 1934, Angel Bakeries in 1927, and the Tnuva dairy in 1926. Electric current mainly flowed to Jewish industry, following it to its nestled locations in Tel Aviv and Haifa. Although Tel Aviv had by far more workshops and factories, the demand for electric power for industry was roughly the same for both cities by the early 1930s.

The country's largest industrial zone was in Haifa, where many housing projects were built for employees.

On the scale of the UN Human Development Index determined for around 1939, of 36 countries, Palestinian Jews were placed 15th, Palestinian Arabs 30th, Egypt 33rd and Turkey 35th. The Jews in Palestine were mainly urban, 76.2% in 1942, while the Arabs were mainly rural, 68.3% in 1942. Overall, Khalidi concludes that Palestinian Arab society, while overmatched by the Yishuv, was as advanced as any other Arab society in the region and considerably more than several.

== Education ==
Under the British Mandate, the country developed economically and culturally. In 1919, the Jewish community founded a centralised Hebrew school system, and the following year established the Assembly of Representatives, the Jewish National Council and the Histadrut labour federation. The Technion university was founded in 1924, and the Hebrew University of Jerusalem in 1925.

There were several attempts by the Arab Palestinians to establish an Arab higher education institution, starting from the 1920s, but it did not materialise. Israeli historian Ilan Pappé attributed this to "Zionist pressure, British anti-Arab racism, and lack of resources." He added that "the colonial mentality of the British authorities who deemed the Palestinians yet another colonized people who had to be oppressed, while regarding the Zionist settlers as fellow colonialists, feared that such a university would enhance the Palestinian national movement."

Literacy rates in 1932 were 86% for the Jews compared to 22% for the Palestinian Arabs, but Arab literacy rates steadily increased thereafter. By comparison, Palestinian Arab literacy rates were higher than those of Egypt and Turkey, but lower than in Lebanon.

== Gallery ==
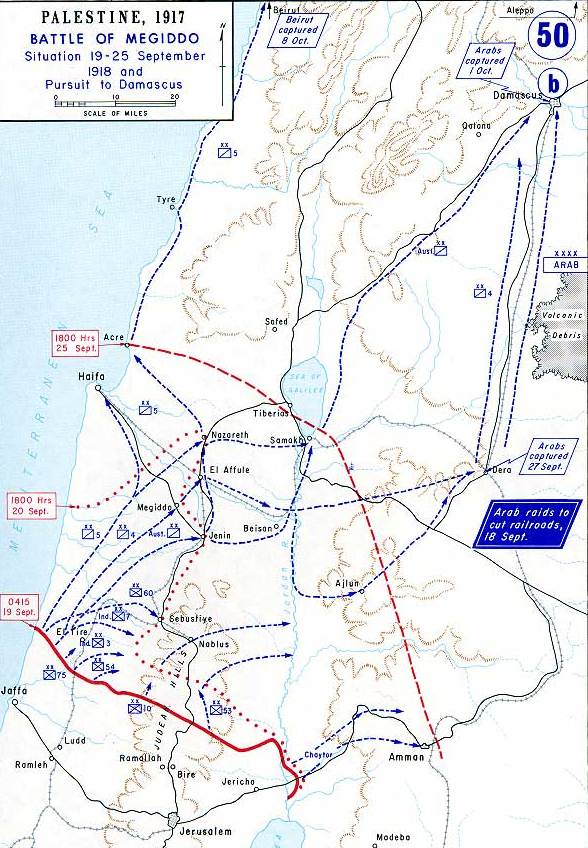
General Sir Edmund Allenby's final attacks of the Palestine Campaign gave Britain control of the area.

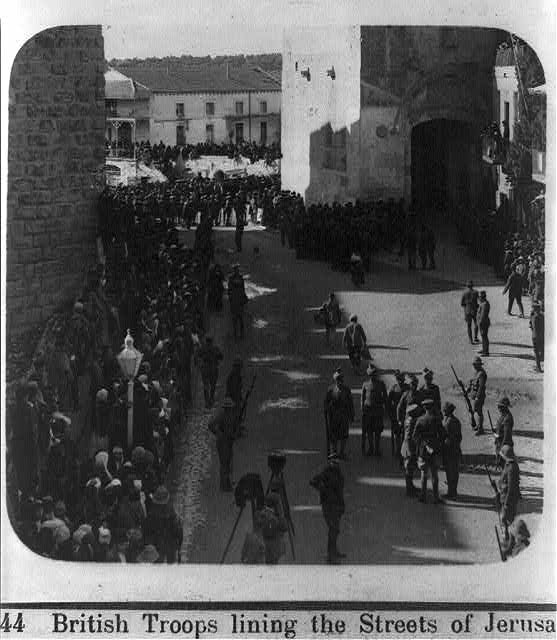
General Allenby entering Jerusalem with British troops on 11 December 1917 (Allenby was later created a field marshal, in April 1919)

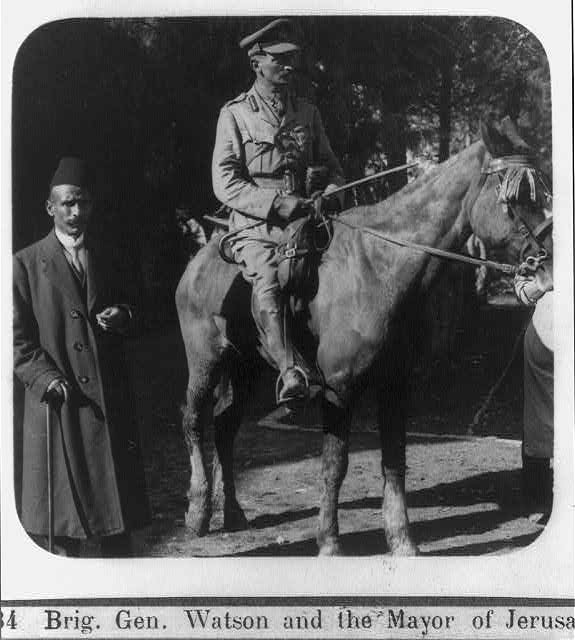
Brigadier-General Watson meeting with Hussein al-Husayni, the Mayor of Jerusalem, in December 1917

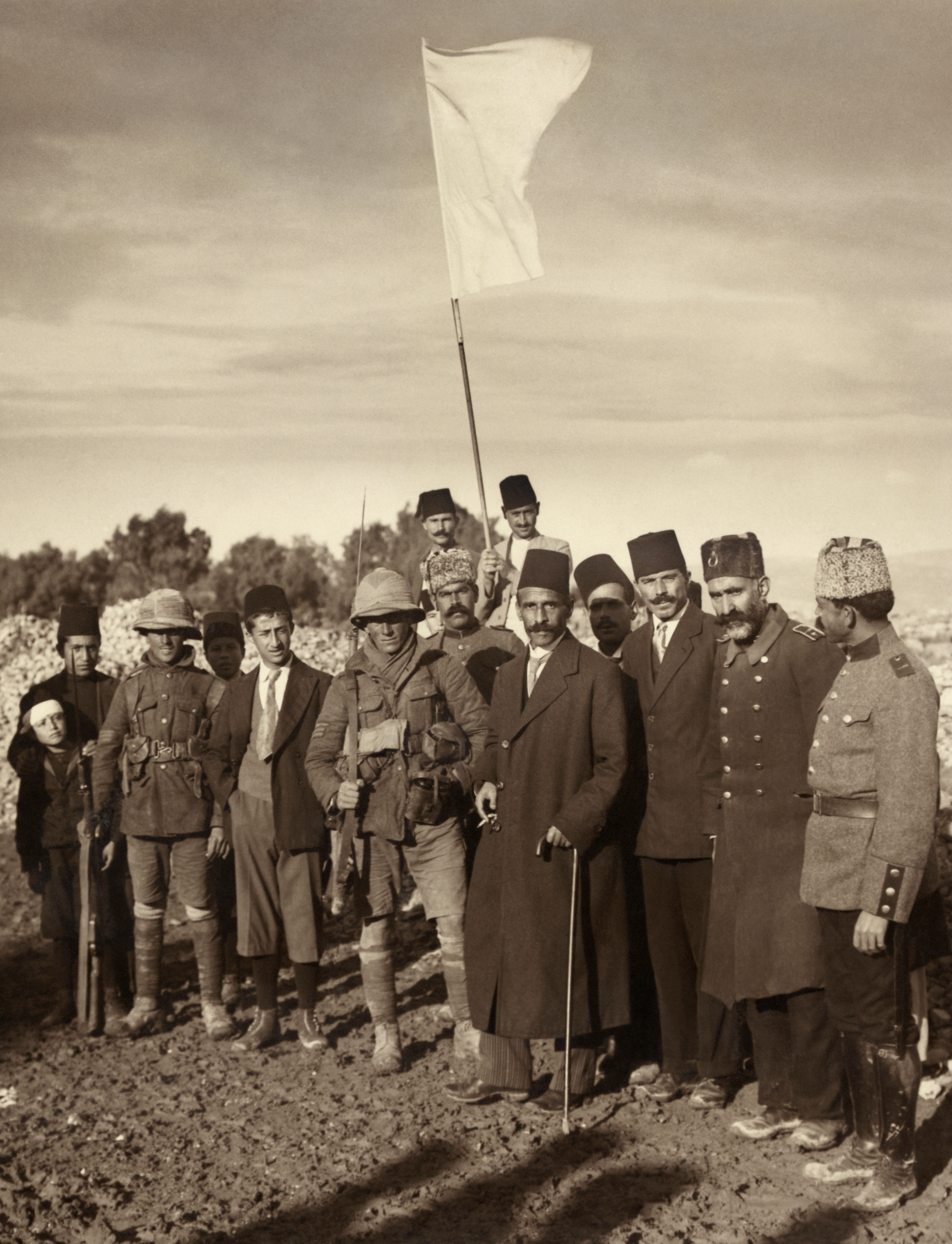
The surrender of Jerusalem by the Ottomans to the British on 9 December 1917 following the Battle of Jerusalem

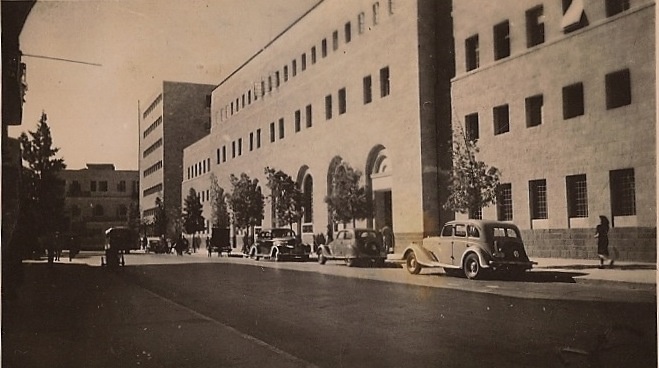
Main post office, Jaffa Road, Jerusalem

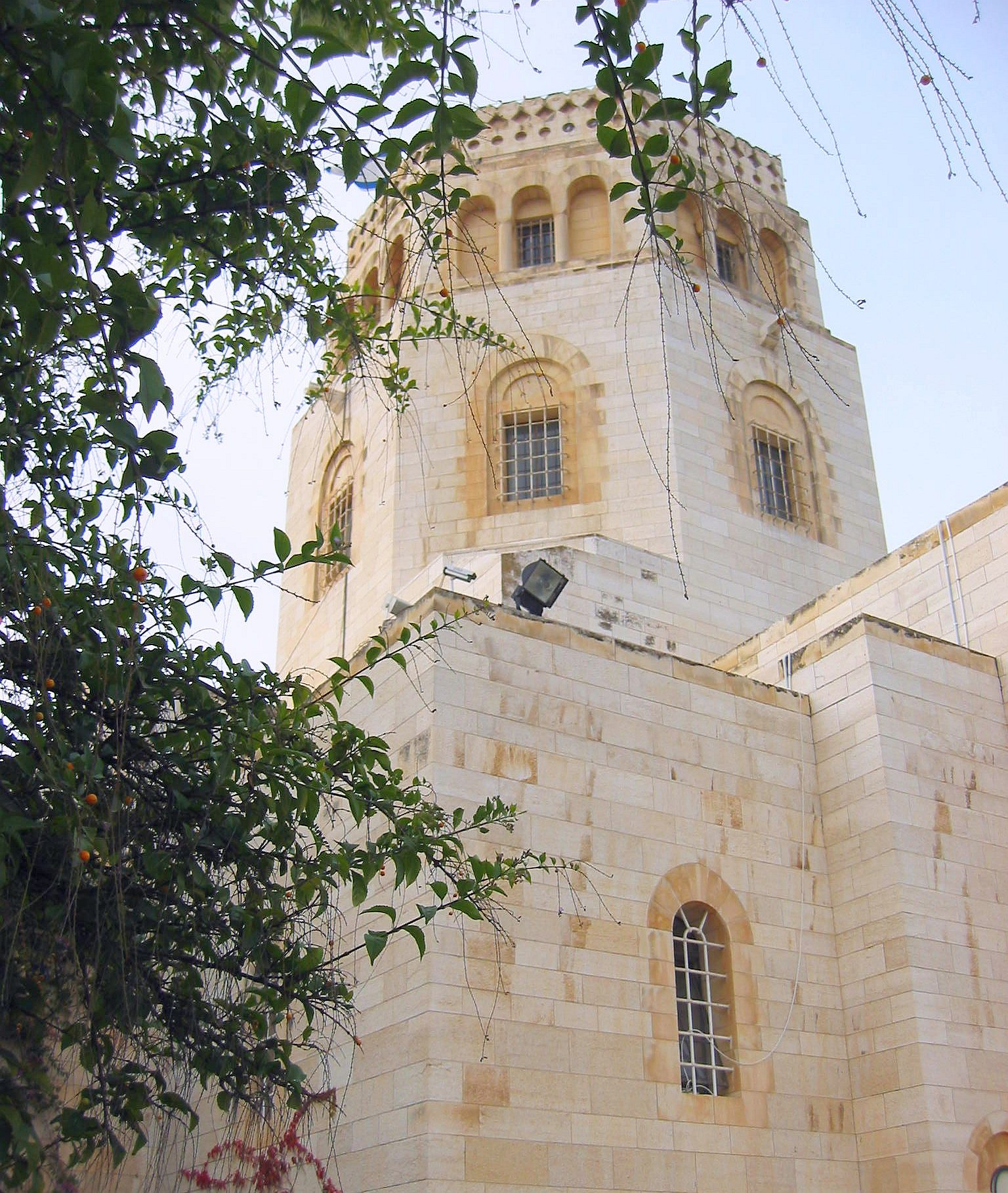
The Palestine Archaeological Museum (PAM; known since 1967 as the Rockefeller Archaeological Museum), built in Jerusalem during the British Mandate

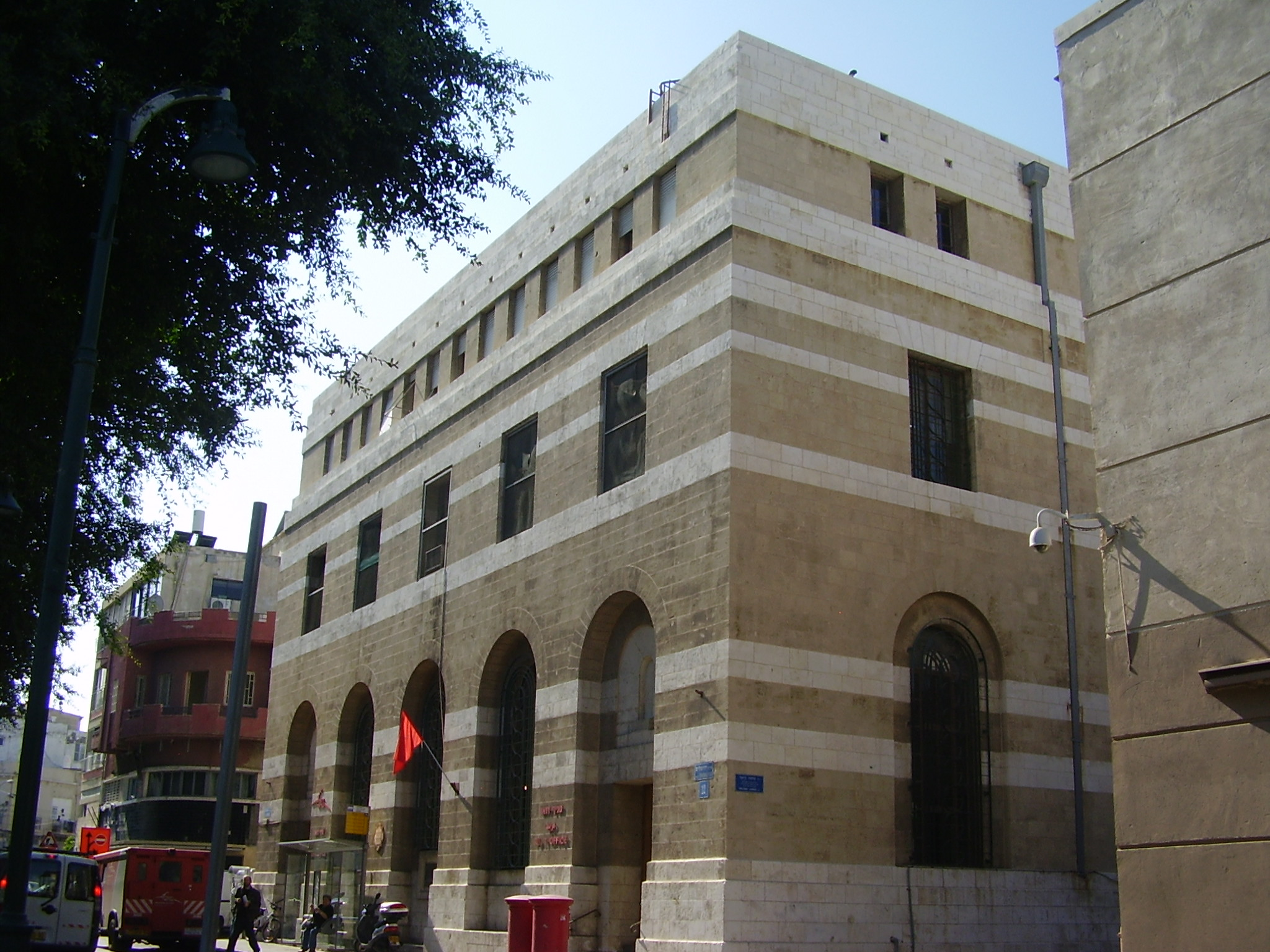
Main post office, Jaffa

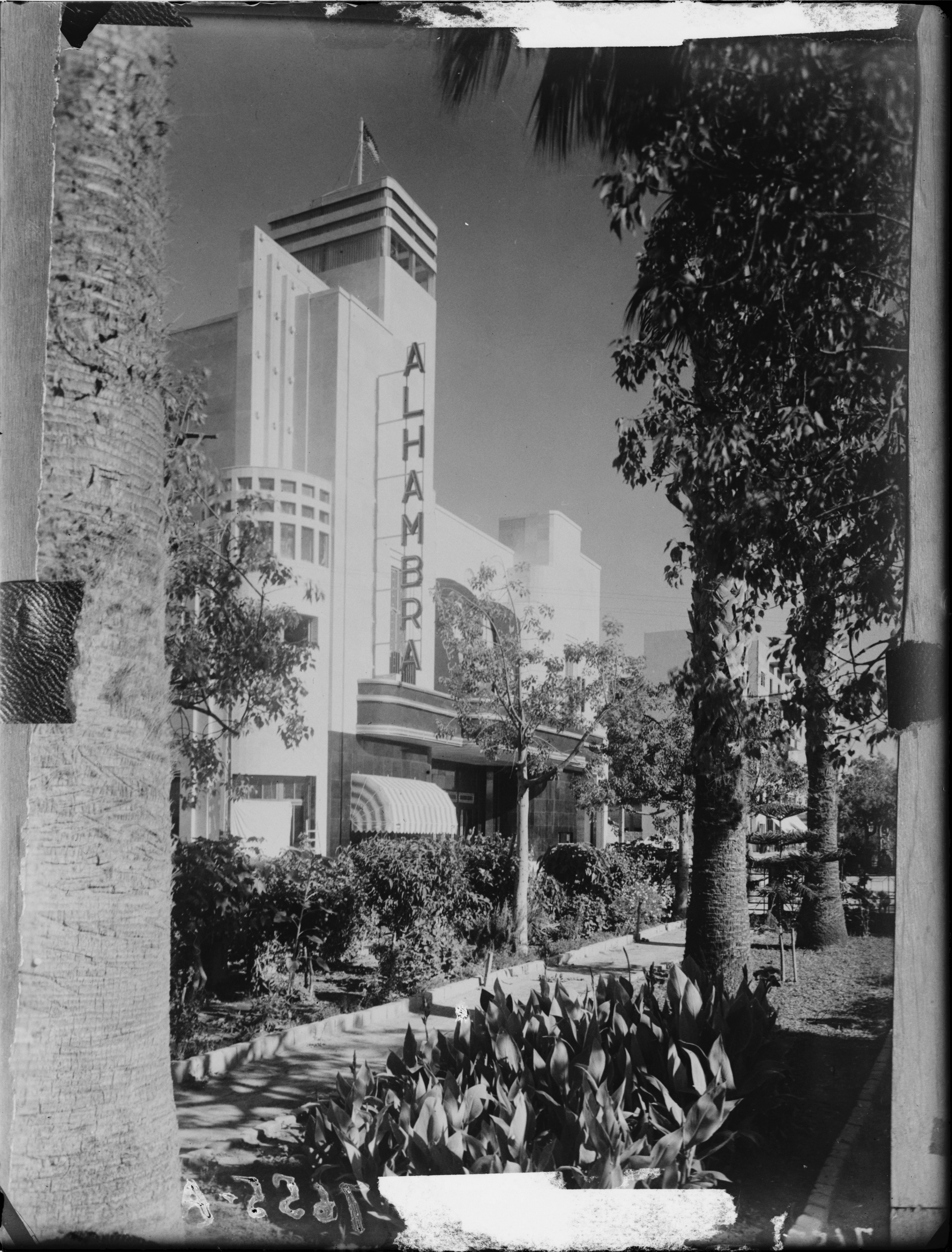
Alhambra Cinema, Jaffa

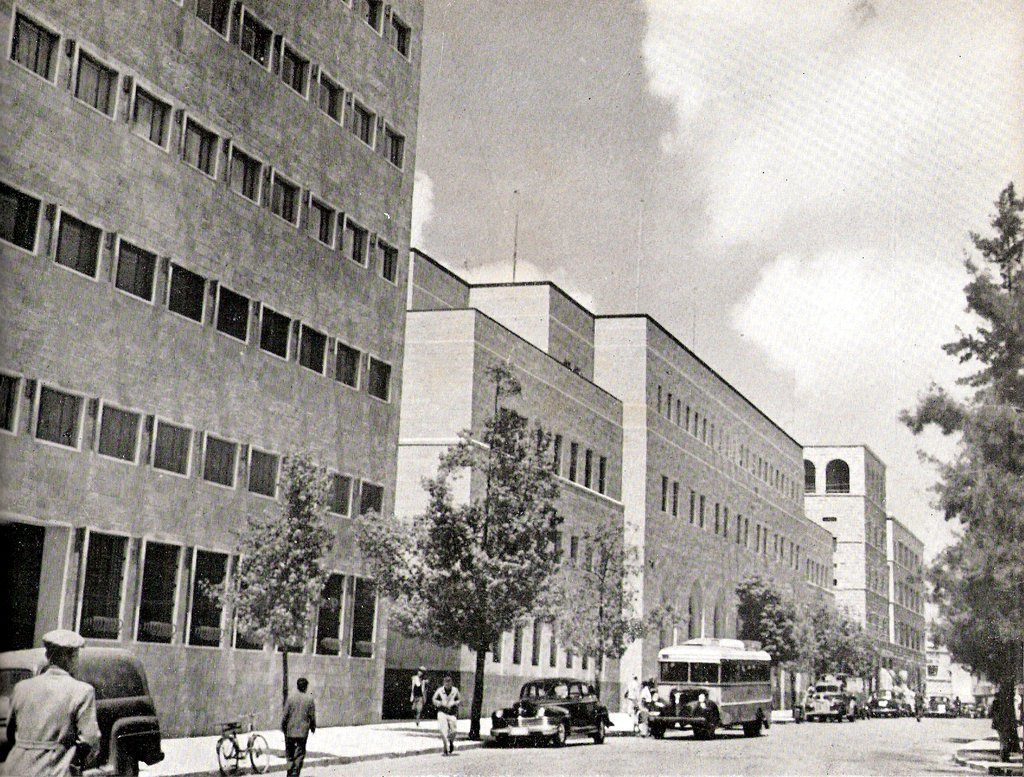
The Anglo-Palestine Bank

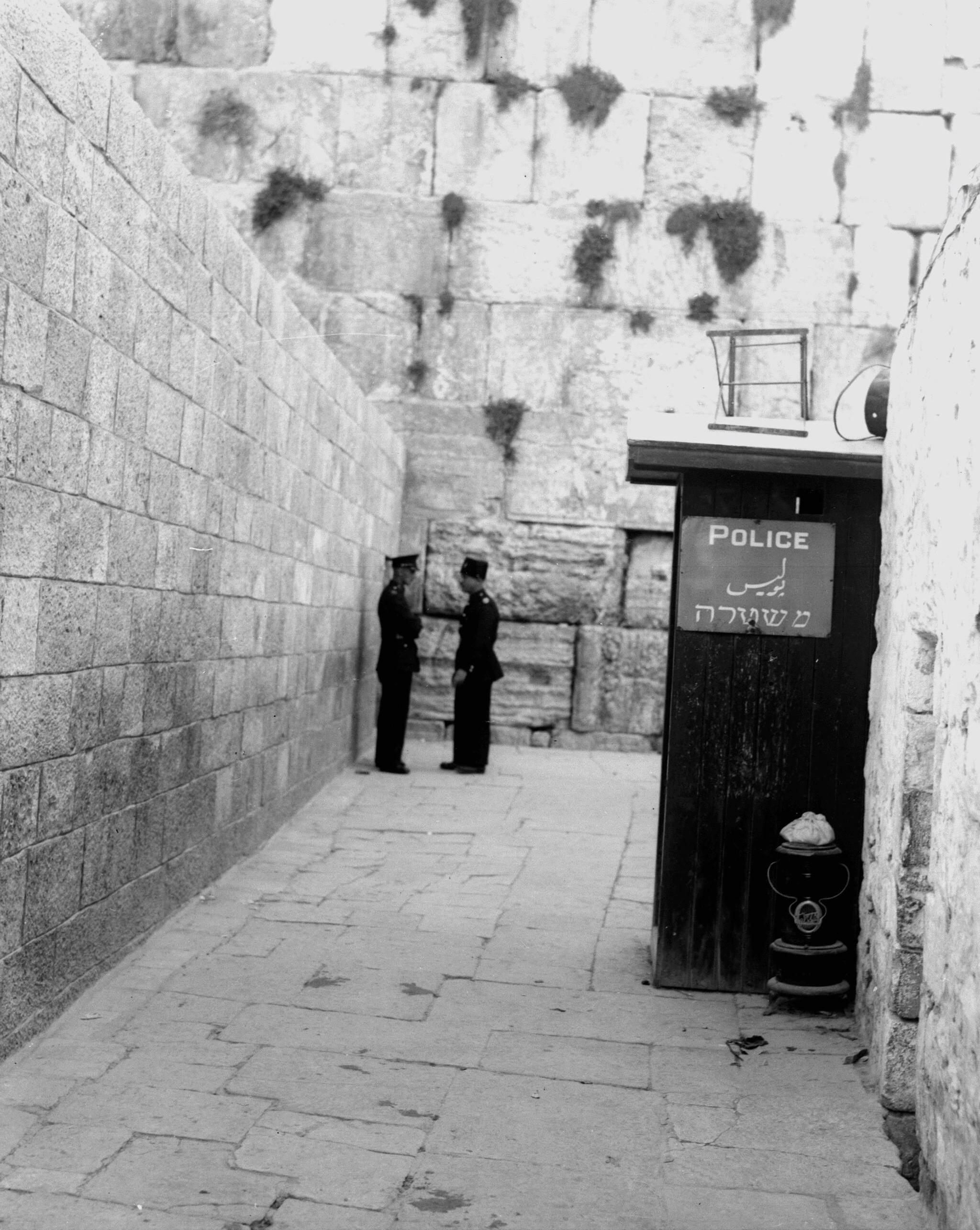
The Western Wall, 1933

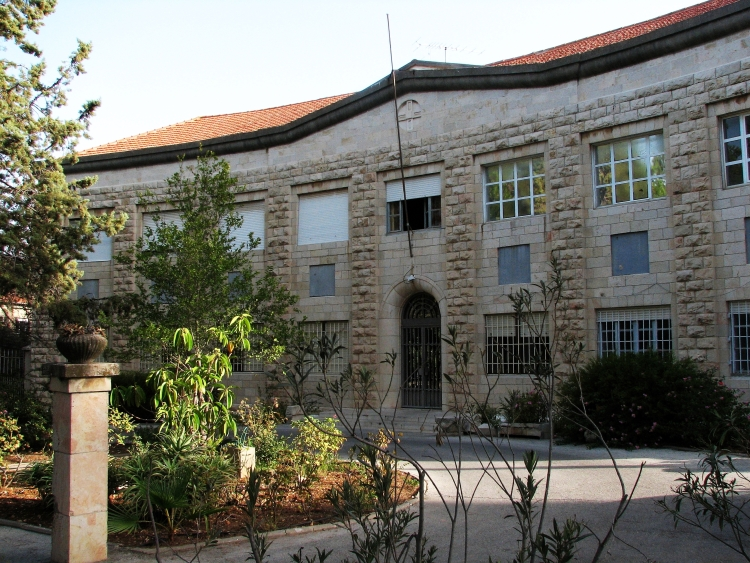
Supreme Military Tribunal of the British Mandate, Kiryat Shmuel, Jerusalem

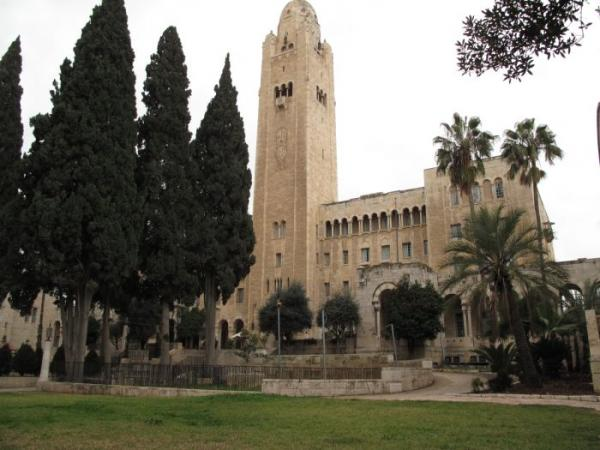
YMCA in Jerusalem, built during the British Mandate

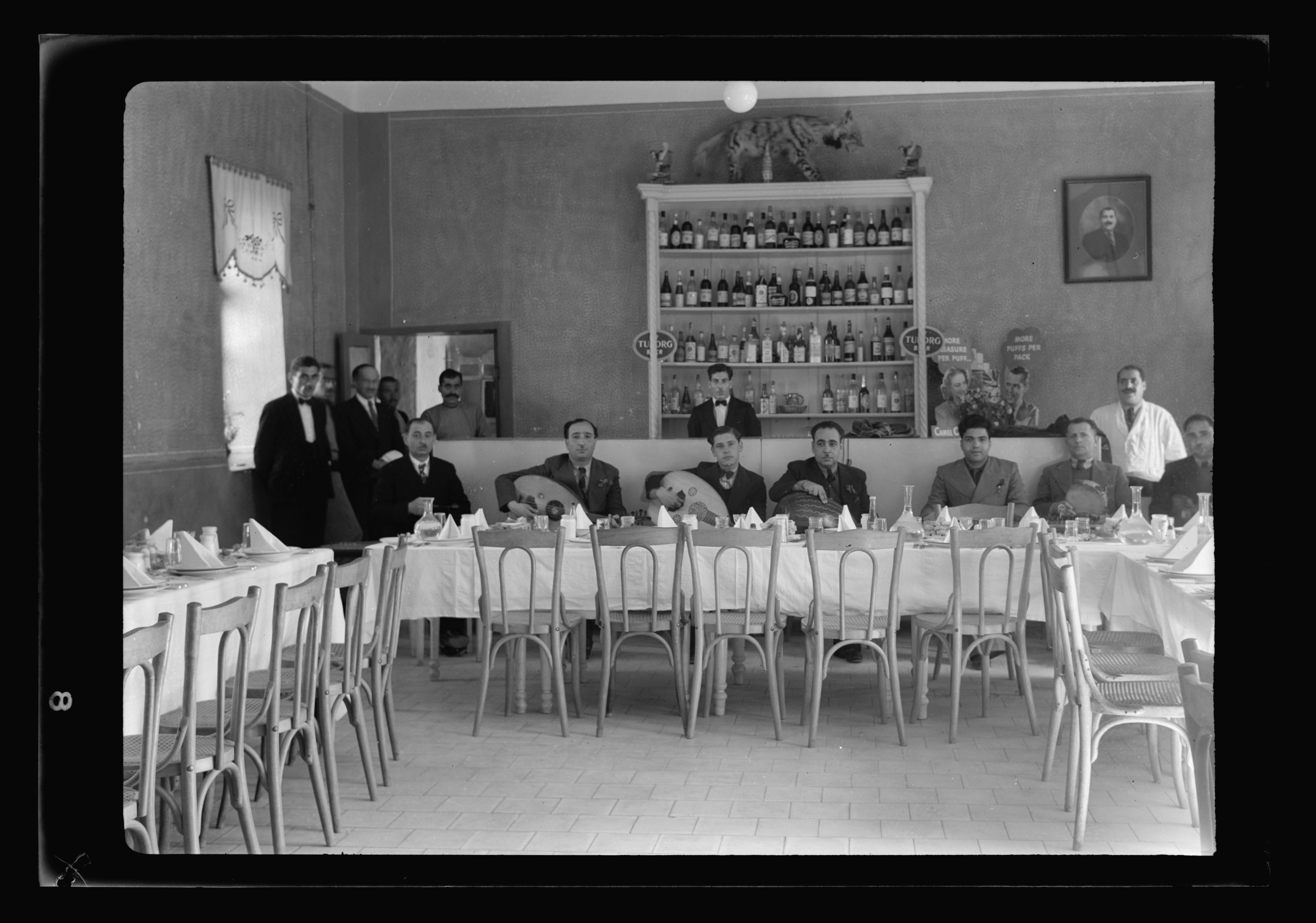
Entertainment program in Jericho by the Palestine Broadcasting Service, which produced its programs in Arabic, Hebrew, and English

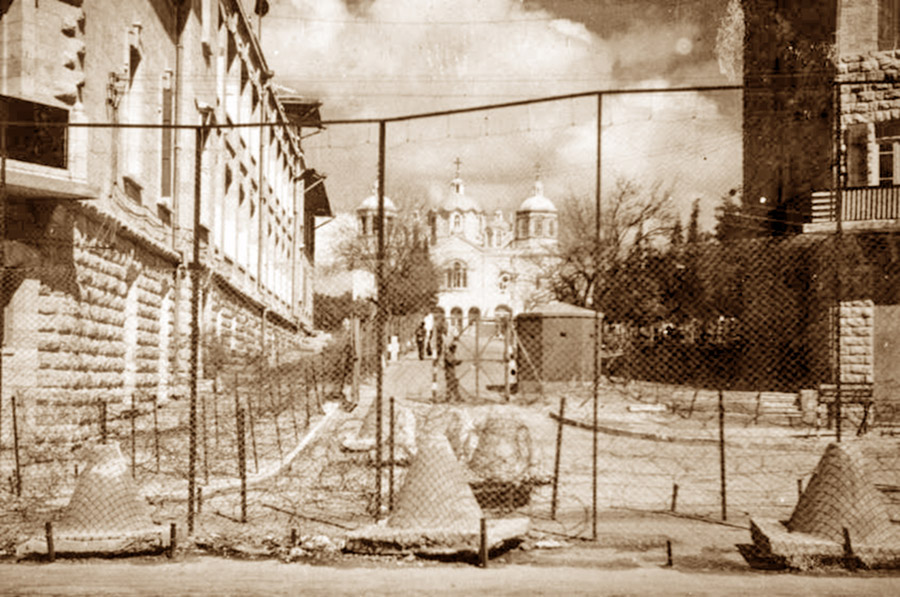
"Bevingrad" in Jerusalem, Russian Compound behind barbed wire

British policeman in Jerusalem, 1948

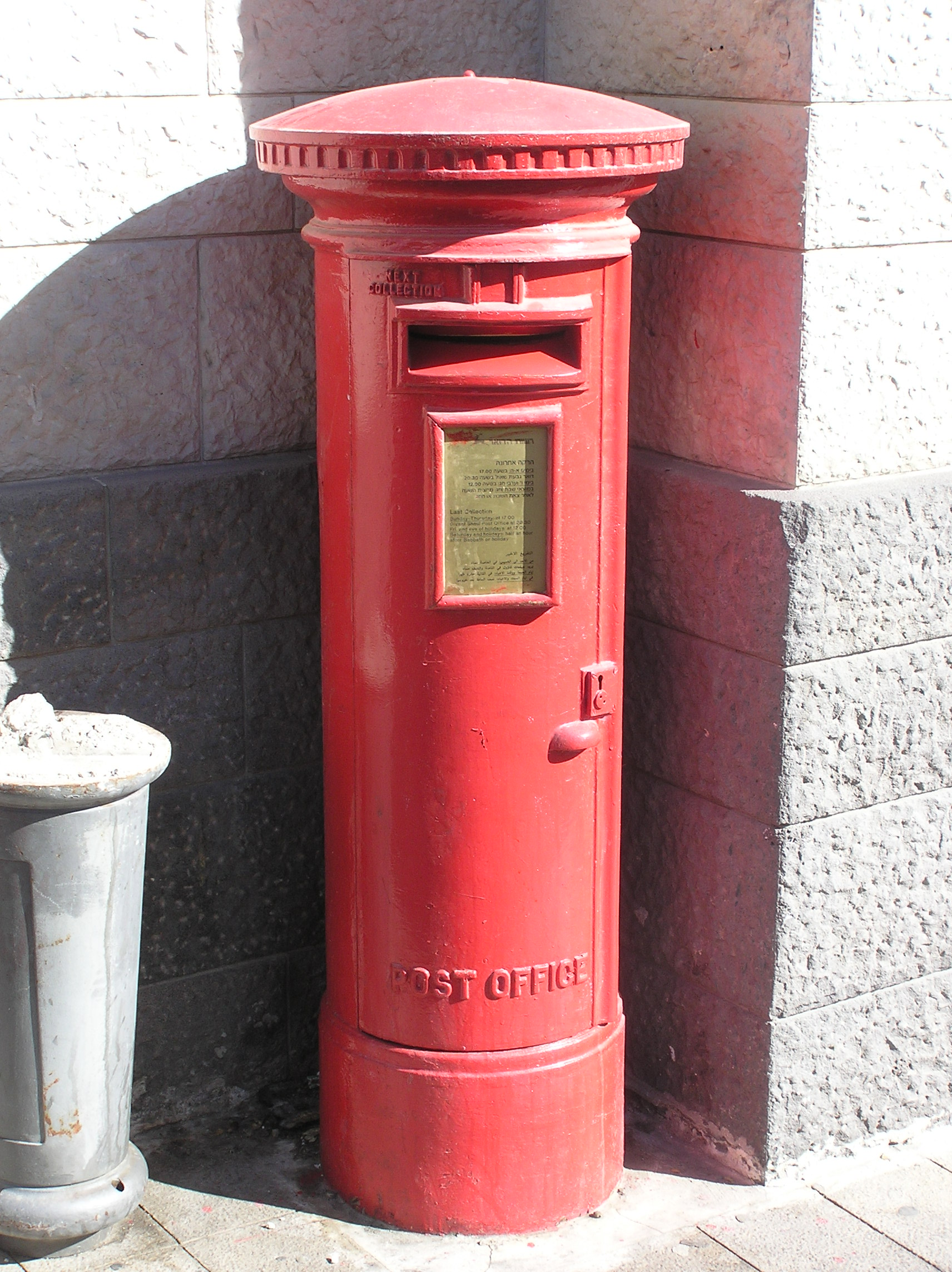
Mandate-era pillar box, Jerusalem

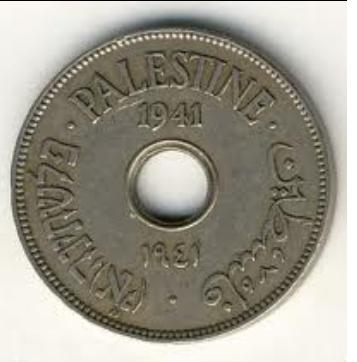
1941 currency coin

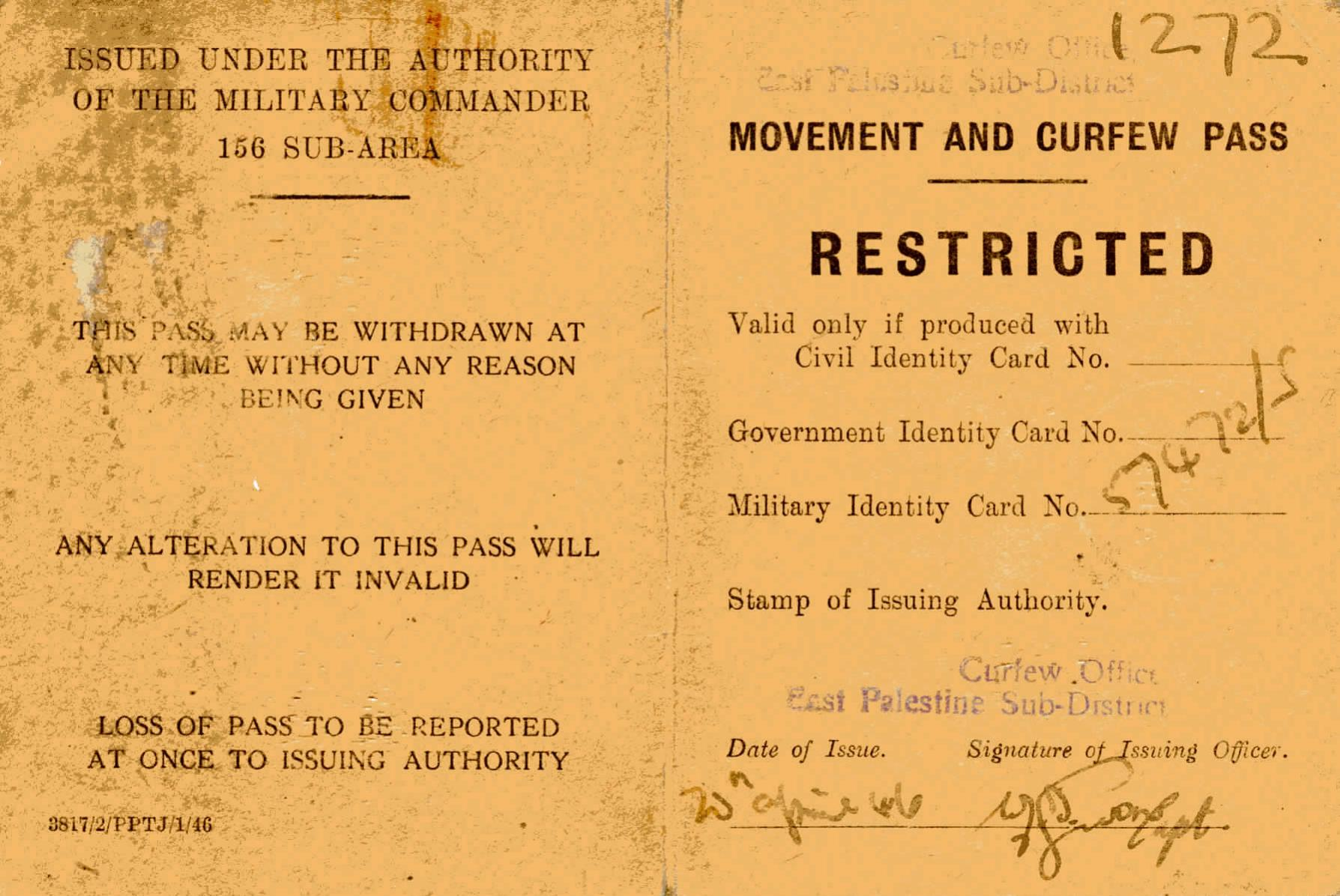
Movement and curfew pass, issued under the authority of the British Military Commander, East Palestine, 1946

Palestine maritime ensign

Palestine customs and postal services ensign

Flag of the High Commissioner

== See also ==
- Mandatory Palestine passport
- Palestinian Citizenship Order 1925
- History of Palestinian journalism
- History of agriculture in Palestine
- Palestine Command
- Palestine pound
- High Commissioners for Palestine and Transjordan
- Israeli Declaration of Independence
- List of post offices in Mandatory Palestine
- Postage stamps and postal history of Palestine

== Bibliography ==
- Aruri, Naseer Hasan (1972). Jordan: A Study in Political Development 1923–1965. The Hague: Martinus Nijhoff Publishers. ISBN 978-90-247-1217-5.
- Avneri, Aryeh L. (1984). The Claim of Dispossession: Jewish Land-Settlement and the Arabs, 1878–1948. Transaction Publishers. ISBN 978-0-87855-964-0.
- Bayliss, Thomas (1999). How Israel Was Won: A Concise History of the Arab–Israeli Conflict. Lexington Books. ISBN 978-0-7391-0064-6.
- Bethell, Nicholas (1979). The Palestine Triangle: the Struggle Between the British, the Jews and the Arabs, 1935–48. London: Deutsch. ISBN 978-0-233-97069-1.
- Biger, Gideon (2004). The Boundaries of Modern Palestine, 1840–1947. London: Routledge. ISBN 978-0-7146-5654-0.
- Black, Ian (1991). Israel's Secret Wars: A History of Israel's Intelligence Services. Morris, Benny. Grove Press. ISBN 978-0-8021-1159-3.
- El-Eini, Roza I.M. (2006). Mandated Landscape: British Imperial Rule in Palestine, 1929–1948. London: Routledge. ISBN 978-0-7146-5426-3.
- Gilbert, Martin (1998). Israel: a history. Doubleday. ISBN 978-0-385-40401-3.
- Gorman, Anthony; Monciaud, Didier, eds. (2018). The Press in the Middle East and North Africa. Edinburgh University Press. ISBN 978-1-4744-3064-7.
- Hughes, Matthew, ed. (2004). Allenby in Palestine: The Middle East Correspondence of Field Marshal Viscount Allenby June 1917 – October 1919. Army Records Society. Vol. 22. Phoenix Mill, Thrupp, Stroud, Gloucestershire: Sutton Publishing Ltd. ISBN 978-0-7509-3841-9.
- Katz, Shmuel (1973). Battleground: Fact and Fantasy in Palestine. Bantam Books. ISBN 978-0-929093-13-0.
- Khalaf, Issa (1991). Politics in Palestine: Arab Factionalism and Social Disintegration, 1939–1948. State University of New York Press. ISBN 978-0-7914-0708-0.
- Khalidi, Rashid (1997). Palestinian Identity: The Construction of Modern National Consciousness. Columbia University Press. ISBN 978-0-231-10575-0.
- Khalidi, Rashid (2006). The Iron Cage: The Story of the Palestinian Struggle for Statehood. Beacon Press. ISBN 978-0-8070-0308-4.
- Khalidi, Rashid (2007) [1st ed. 2001]. "The Palestinians and 1948: the underlying causes of failure". In Eugene L. Rogan & Avi Shlaim (ed.). The War for Palestine: Rewriting the History of 1948 (2nd ed.). Cambridge University Press. ISBN 978-0-521-69934-1.
- Khalidi, Walid (1987) [Original in 1971]. From Haven to Conquest: Readings in Zionism and the Palestine Problem Until 1948. Institute for Palestine Studies. ISBN 978-0-88728-155-6.
- Kominko, Maja (16 February 2015). From Dust to Digital: Ten Years of the Endangered Archives Programme. Open Book Publishers. ISBN 978-1-78374-062-8.
- Likhovski, Assaf (8 December 2006). Law and Identity in Mandate Palestine. Univ of North Carolina Press. ISBN 978-0-8078-7718-0.
- Louis, Wm. Roger (1969). "The United Kingdom and the Beginning of the Mandates System, 1919–1922". International Organization. 23 (1): 73–96. doi:10.1017/s0020818300025534. S2CID 154745632.
- Morris, Benny (2001) [1999]. Righteous Victims: A History of the Zionist–Arab Conflict, 1881–1999. New York: Alfred A. Knopf. ISBN 978-0-679-74475-7.
- Pappé, Ilan (15 August 1994). "Introduction". The Making of the Arab–Israeli Conflict, 1947–1951. I.B.Tauris. ISBN 978-1-85043-819-9.
- Paris, Timothy J. (2003). Britain, the Hashemites and Arab Rule, 1920–1925: The Sherifian Solution. London: Routledge. ISBN 978-0-7146-5451-5.
- Regan, Bernard (30 October 2018). The Balfour Declaration: Empire, the Mandate and Resistance in Palestine. Verso Books. ISBN 978-1-78663-248-7.
- Segev, Tom (2000). One Palestine, Complete: Jews and Arabs Under the British Mandate. Translated by Watzman, Haim. London: Henry Holt and Company. ISBN 978-0-8050-4848-3.
- Shapira, Anita (1992). Land and Power: The Zionist Resort to Force, 1881–1948. trans. William Templer. Oxford University Press. ISBN 978-0-19-506104-8.
- ——— (2012). Israel: A History. UPNE. ISBN 978-1-61168-353-0.
- Sherman, A. J. (1998). Mandate Days: British Lives in Palestine, 1918–1948. Thames & Hudson. ISBN 978-0-8018-6620-3.
- Stein, Kenneth W. (1987) [Original in 1984]. The Land Question in Palestine, 1917–1939. University of North Carolina Press. ISBN 978-0-8078-4178-5.
- Vareilles, Guillaume (2010). Les frontières de la Palestine, 1914–1947. Paris: L'Harmattan. ISBN 978-2-296-13621-2.
