= SS President Harrison =

Steam passenger-cargo ship built in 1919–1920

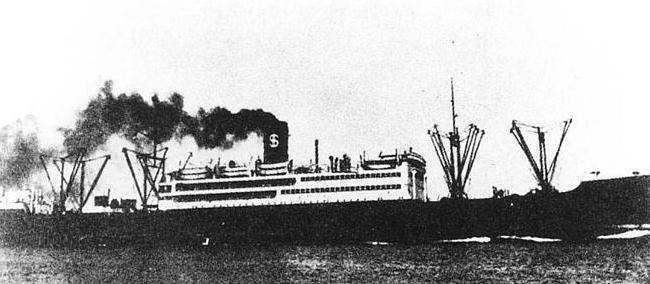
- Kachidoki Maru

History

United States
- Name: Wolverine State (1920–1922); President Harrison (1922–1941)
- Namesake: Michigan; Benjamin Harrison
- Owner: USSB (1921–1923); Dollar Steamship Co. (1924–1938); American President Lines (1938–1941)
- Operator: Pacific Mail Steamship Co. (1921–Jun 1922); Los Angeles Steamship Co. (Oct 1922–Feb 1923); Swayne & Hoyt (1923)
- Port of registry: San Francisco
- Ordered: 1 July 1918
- Builder: New York Shipbuilding Corp., Camden
- Yard number: 248
- Laid down: 13 May 1919
- Launched: 16 September 1920
- Sponsored by: Mrs. Edith W. Tweedale
- Commissioned: 6 January 1921
- Maiden voyage: 22 January 1921
- Identification: US Official Number: 220952; Code letters: MCGR (1921–1933); Call sign: KDMQ (1934–1941)
- Fate: Ran aground, 8 December 1941

Empire of Japan
- Name: Kachidoki Maru (勝鬨丸)
- In service: 1942-1944
- Identification: 5025
- Fate: Sunk, 12 September 1944

General characteristics
- Type: Design 1095 Passenger-cargo ship
- Tonnage: 10,533 GRT; 6,195 NRT; 13,034 DWT
- Length: 502.1 ft (153.0 m)
- Beam: 62.2 ft (19.0 m)
- Depth: 28.3 ft (8.6 m)
- Installed power: 782 nhp, 7,000 ihp (5,200 kW)
- Propulsion: 2 x New York Shipbuilding Co. 4-cylinder triple expansion; Twin screws
- Speed: 14 knots (26 km/h; 16 mph)

Wolverine State was a steam passenger-cargo ship built in 1919–1920 by New York Shipbuilding Company of Camden, New Jersey for the United States Shipping Board (USSB) as part of the wartime shipbuilding program of the Emergency Fleet Corporation (EFC) to restore the nation's Merchant Marine. The ship was initially employed on the United States to India route until its cancellation in Spring 1922. After remodeling, the vessel was briefly used by the Los Angeles Steamship Company on a run between Los Angeles and Honolulu as an emergency replacement for one of their burned out steamers. In April 1922 the steamer was renamed President Harrison. In 1923 she conducted several trips between California and the east coast of South America, before being sold together with several other ships of her class to the Dollar Steamship Company. The vessel was captured in 1941 by the Japanese after she was deliberately run aground to avoid the capture. After repairs, the ship was renamed Kachidoki Maru (勝鬨丸), put under control of NYK Line and entered the Japan to Taiwan route, but soon after was requisitioned by the Imperial Japanese Army. Under IJA control the ship sailed between Japan, Singapore and the Philippines carrying troops and military supplies. She was torpedoed and sunk on 12 September 1944 on one of her regular trips, while carrying 950 Allied prisoners of war of which 431 were killed.

== Design and construction ==
After the United States entry into World War I, a large shipbuilding program was undertaken to restore and enhance shipping capabilities both of the United States and their Allies. As part of this program, EFC placed orders with nation's shipyards for a large number of vessels of standard designs. Design 1095 ship was originally conceived as a fast troop transport, subsequently modified into passenger and cargo vessel of approximately 13,000 deadweight tonnage after the end of hostilities.

Wolverine State was part of initial order for seven vessels placed by the USSB on 1 July 1918 with the New York Shipbuilding Corp. The ship was laid down at the shipbuilder's yard on 13 May 1919 (yard number 248) and launched on 16 September 1920, with Mrs. Edith W. Tweedale, wife of Alonzo Tweedale, controller for the USSB, being the sponsor. While the vessel was primarily designed for cargo transportation, she also possessed first-class accommodations for 78 passengers. Wolverine State had three decks and also had weather decks constructed on top amidships. A dining hall, a smoking room and a social hall were built and made available for passenger entertainment. The vessel was built on the transverse system of framing and had her hull subdivided into fourteen watertight compartments. She also possessed all the modern machinery for quick loading and unloading of cargo from nine main hatches, including thirty two 6-ton and one 30-ton booms and twenty steam winches. She also had two of her storage chambers totaling approximately 1,300 tons equipped with refrigerating machinery for transportation of perishable goods such as meat, fruits and vegetables. The ship had electric lights in cabins and along the decks, had submarine signal system installed and was equipped with wireless apparatus.

As built, the ship was 502.1 feet (153.0 m) long (between perpendiculars) and 62.2 feet (19.0 m) abeam, and had a depth of 28.3 feet (8.6 m). Wolverine State was originally assessed at 10,533 GRT and 6,195 NRT and had deadweight tonnage of approximately 13,000. The vessel had a steel hull with double bottom throughout, and two sets of four-cylinder vertical inverted triple expansion steam engines, with cylinders of 24-inch (61 cm), 40 1/2-inch (103 cm), 54-inch (140 cm) and 54-inch (140 cm) diameter with a 45-inch (110 cm) stroke, that drove two screw propellers and moved the ship at up to 15 knots (28 km/h; 17 mph). The steam for the engines was supplied by six single-ended Scotch marine boilers fitted for oil fuel.

The sea trials were held on 5 January 1921 in the Delaware Bay, off Cape Henlopen. The ship was able to achieve an average speed of 15 knots (28 km/h) over the measured mile, and top speed of 16.5 knots, exceeding her contract requirements. After successful completion of sea trials, the ship was turned over to the Shipping Board representatives the next day.

== Operational history ==
=== Under USSB control ===
Upon delivery to her owners, Wolverine State was immediately allocated to the Pacific Mail Steamship Company to operate on their route between the West Coast of the United States and East Asia. The vessel then proceeded to Baltimore where she took on board a token load of general cargo and 71 passengers before sailing out on 22 January 1921 bound for San Francisco. The ship passed through the Panama Canal on January 31 and arrived at Los Angeles on February 11 after largely an uneventful journey, successfully completing her maiden voyage. She then continued to San Francisco and after loading about 920 tons of freight and embarking ten passengers departed for Honolulu on February 25. After encountering stormy weather on her way to Hawaii, Wolverine State reached her destination on March 4. She sailed out on the same day bound for Calcutta and reached it on April 3 via Manila and Saigon. The vessel departed Calcutta three weeks later with over 7,000 tons of oriental goods as well as exotic birds and monkeys, and reached San Francisco on May 28, successfully concluding her first trip in the Pacific. She immediately sailed out on her second voyage. During the first night out from San Francisco, flames were observed coming out of the funnel. The steamer had to stop and after an investigation it was discovered that large number of 2x4 planks were left in the air space separating the inner and out linings of the funnel. It took approximately five to six hours to clear out the chimney, but the ship suffered no damage and was able to proceed on her journey. While the vessel was still on her trip, rumors started appearing that the Shipping Board was going to discontinue the service to India as unprofitable. Wolverine State returned home from her second trip in early September via Hawaii where she loaded part cargo of pineapples, hides and tallow. Upon arrival, several members of her crew were arrested for an attempted smuggling of 48 quart bottles of whiskey. Regardless of the rumors, Wolverine State departed for her third trip to India in mid-October, carrying among other cargo approximately 100,000 feet of cedar lumber, ordered by Japanese to make pencils, but believed by many to be used in production of airplanes. On her return trip, one of the cylinders on her engines cracked and exploded, forcing the ship to reduce her speed significantly. After an 18-hour long struggle to repair the blown cylinder in super-heated environment, the crew managed to fix the problem Wolverine State managed to catch up on her lost time and reached her destination only three hours behind her scheduled arrival time on January 10, 1922. After Wolverine State departed for her last voyage to India, the Shipping Board officially announced the removal of all three vessels from the route, although the Pacific Mail managed to retain two of the withdrawn steamers for a shorter route to Honolulu and the Philippines. The Shipping Board also agreed to recondition and rebuilt both vessels to increase the number of steerage passengers to approximately 220. The steamer arrived home from her last trip to India in mid-April with a cargo of consisting mostly of jute and gunny sacks in addition to 1,000 tons of rubber, and was subsequently put into drydock of Moore Shipbuilding Company for reconditioning. At the same time USSB also decided to rename all of the big liners in honor of the United States presidents, with Wolverine State becoming President Harrison.

The rebuilding work was finalized by June and President Harrison was scheduled to depart for Manila and Hong Kong, when USSB abruptly cancelled the route again citing lack of profitability. The steamer was berthed in San Francisco and remained laid up until mid-October, when the Los Angeles Steamship Co. made an emergency request to the Shipping Board to provide them with a temporary replacement for the burned steamer City of Honolulu in order to maintain the schedule. The ship left Los Angeles on the first trip on her new route on October 23 and reached Hawaii about a week later. In the meantime, USSB assigned President Harrison to Swayne & Hoyt to operate between the West Coast of the United States and ports on the east coast of South America. The transfer was delayed for several months to give Los Angeles Steamship Co. a chance to find and refit a suitable replacement steamer. President Harrison departed Honolulu on November 4 with passengers and cargo consisting of typical Hawaiian exports, such as bananas and pineapples. The Shipping Board then extended her lease with the Los Angeles Steamship Co. for four trips, and then for one extra trip in January 1923, before finally allocating the steamer to Swayne & Hoyt in early February.

President Harrison was immediately put into service as part of the Pacific Argentine Brazil Line, and departed from Seattle and other Puget Sound ports laden with lumber, apples and other general merchandise on 25 February 1923 bound for South America. She took aboard more passengers and cargo at San Francisco and San Pedro and safely reached Rio de Janeiro on April 7 after a 41 day long passage. In early June 1923, President Harding set out on a journey to cross the country, visit Alaska Territory, travel south along the West Coast, then go by ship from San Diego through the Panama Canal to Puerto Rico. President Harrison was selected initially to serve as a vessel by which the President would undertake such travel. The ship's accommodations were to be refurbished and rebuilt in anticipation of important passenger, and all passenger reservations were preemptively cancelled to ensure the President would not be disturbed on his voyage. The company even went as far as switch the captains at sea to ensure the most experienced master was navigating the vessel. However, about a month later this arrangement was cancelled and President Harrison instead went back to her usual duties, leaving on her second trip to South America in early August.

While President Harrison was on her voyage, Dollar Steamship Company approached the Shipping Board about acquiring seven steamers to serve on their proposed round-the-world passenger service to be run between San Francisco and New York via East Asia and the Mediterranean. The deal was struck in early September 1923 and President Harrison together with six of her sister ships were purchased by the Dollar Steamship Co. for $550,000 each. President Harrison returned to California on 21 October 1923 and after unloading her cargo was transferred to her new owners. The ship remained berthed in the harbor until mid-December when she was put into drydock to apply finishing touches before her inaugural trip, scheduled for early January 1924.

=== Dollar Steamship Co. (1924–1938) ===
The round-the-world service announced by the Dollar Steamship Co. envisioned biweekly departures by all seven vessels, allowing the passengers to leave one ship at any port and reboard a different vessel and continue their journey. The ships were to call at Honolulu, Kobe, Shanghai, Hong Kong, Manila, Singapore, Penang, Colombo, Suez, Alexandria, Naples, Genoa, Marseille and from there proceed directly to Boston and finish their trip in New York. The cost of such a trip from San Francisco to New York would range from $1,000 to $1,440 depending on the service and type of accommodations. From New York the ships would sail to Havana and then through the Panama Canal return to San Francisco to complete their round-the-world journeys. President Harrison was to be the first ship to sail on this route, and was officially transferred to her new owners in a special ceremony held on 24 December 1923, with many local dignitaries present. On 5 January 1924, President Coolidge sent a wireless signal from the White House to the operator on President Harrison, and the steamer left her berth to the cheers of nearly 5,000 spectators and notable guests, including mayor of San Francisco James Rolph Jr., John Philip Sousa and Admiral Edward R. Simpson, to inaugurate the service. The ship arrived at Boston on 25 March 1924 after 79 days long voyage, one day behind the schedule, to successfully complete the first leg of her inaugural trip. President Harrison returned to California at the end of April, successfully completing her first round-the world voyage in approximately 110 days. The vessel continued serving roughly the same route until the start of World War II. On her second trip President Harrison picked up a group of Siamese dancers and performers at Singapore and brought them to New York to perform at the Hippodrome. During her third voyage, the ship was reported to be in distress while travelling in the Mediterranean, however, that soon turned out to be a mix-up and the vessel safely arrived at Boston in late February 1925. On her next voyage, President Harrison carried home the body of Pancho Villa after he suddenly died during the operation.

In October 1926 while the ship was off the Baja California coast, one of the passengers aboard the vessel fell seriously ill, prompting US Navy destroyer Decatur to rush a surgeon team from San Diego to perform an operation on board the liner. The operation was successful and the passenger was transferred to a hospital upon arrival in Los Angeles where she stayed to recover. In the early morning hours on 6 November 1926 while proceeding from Shanghai to Hong Kong in foggy weather, President Harrison ran aground on Bonham Island, off the mouth of the Yangtze River. As a result of grounding, she sustained considerable damage to her bottom prompting passenger evacuation. The steamer was refloated next day and was able to proceed to Shanghai under her own power where she entered the drydock for repairs. The grounding forced the Dollar Lines to adjust their schedules as it was learned the work on President Harrison would take several months to finalize. It took almost two months to complete the repairs and the liner was finally able to leave Shanghai at the end of January 1927.

In early January 1929 it was announced that the Dollar Steamship Company decided to upgrade and remodel several of their liners, including President Harrison at a total cost of approximately $2,000,000. It was planned to increase the number of available accommodations to about 150 and make general improvements to the cabins as well as addition of the covered promenade deck. The contract for remodeling was awarded to the Newport News Shipbuilding and Drydock Company and the work on President Harrison commenced soon after her arrival from her regular round-the-world trip. It took more than two months to finish the upgrades, and President Harrison sailed out from Newport News on 29 April 1929 to resume her regular service.

In the afternoon of 21 August 1929 President Harrison spotted a lifeboat carrying 13 survivors from old German steamer SS Quimistan near Sable Island. The second lifeboat with 13 more survivors, including the captain, was found an hour and a half later. Quimistan was on her last voyage from Norfolk to Genoa to be scrapped there, when she suddenly developed a leak in the afternoon of August 18. After several hours of trying unsuccessfully to stop the water, the crew was forced to abandon the ship in sinking condition in the early morning hours of August 19. Quimistan was spotted drifting and burning by steamer SS Yuma who reported her as a menace to navigation. The entire crew was safely landed in New York on August 24, while Quimistan was never located and was presumed to sink soon after the crew left her.

=== American President Lines (1938–1941) ===
President Harrison was chartered by the United States Navy 27–28 November 1941 to evacuate the 4th Marines from Shanghai (and also the crates with the remains of the now lost Peking Man), returning to Olongapo, Philippines on 3 December. She was then dispatched to Qinhuangdao (near Beijing) to pick up about 300 Marines of the Beijing and Tianjin Legation Guards and some 1400 tons of equipment and return to Manila. Under pursuit by the Japanese she was run aground on 8 December on Shaweishan Island at 16 knots to rip her bottom out and deny her use to the Japanese. President Harrison struck the edge of the island on her port side and then rolled off. The impact ripped a hole 90 feet long, but did not reach the engine room spaces. The ship almost turned over, but righted herself. Strong currents then carried her off the rocks and she settled on a mud bank. Three were killed when a lifeboat was cut in half by her propellers during the abandoning of the ship. The crew and troops, 156 in total, were sent to prisoner of war (POW) camps. They were some of the first US POWs of World War II. In the POW camp, 12 of the ship's crew died; three were shot dead exiting the ship. Some of the crew were sent to coal mine forced labor camps in Hokkaido, Japan. Japan salvaged and repaired the ship, renaming her Kakko Maru and later Kachidoki Maru.

=== Kachidoki Maru (1942–1944) ===
The troopship was part of convoy HI-72, transporting some 950 Australian and British POWs and 1,095 Japanese from Singapore to Formosa (Taiwan). Another ship in the convoy was SS Rakuyō Maru with 1,317 Allied POWs on board.

On the morning of 12 September 1944, the convoy was attacked in the Luzon Strait by a wolfpack consisting of three US submarines: Growler, Pampanito and Sealion. Rakuyō Maru was torpedoed by Sealion and sunk with 1,159 POWs killed.

Kachidoki Maru was torpedoed and sunk by Pampanito. Japanese destroyers rescued most Japanese and 520 British prisoners from Kachidoki Maru. 431 prisoners of war, 45 troops and 12 crewmen were killed. The survivors were transferred to Kibutsu Maru and taken to Japan.
