= Fred L. Baker =

American businessperson

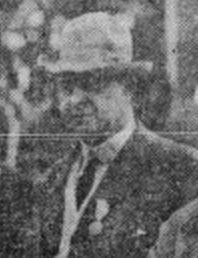
- Baker in 1910

Member of the Los Angeles City Council for the 2nd ward
- In office December 16, 1896 – December 12, 1900
- Preceded by: Meredith P. Snyder
- Succeeded by: George P. McLain

Personal details
- Born: 1872 Lansing, Michigan
- Died: January 9, 1927 (aged 54–55) Los Angeles, California
- Party: Republican

Fred L. Baker (1872 – January 9, 1927) was an industrialist, business owner, shipbuilder, president of the Automobile Club of Southern California and member of the Los Angeles City Council.

== Personal ==
=== Family ===
Baker was born in 1872 in Lansing, Michigan, the son of Milo Stannard Baker, and in 1875 was brought to Los Angeles with the family when he was nine years old. He had a younger brother, Milo A., and a sister, Belle.

Baker's wife was Lillian T. Baker, and they had a son, Lawrence T. Baker, and two daughters, Mrs. Guy C. Boynton and Mrs. Fulton Lane. A 1913 article listed Walter J. Wallace, president of the Sierra Vista Ranch Company, as Fred L. Baker's son-in-law.

=== Memberships ===
Baker was a member of the California Club, the Los Angeles Country Club, the Los Angeles Athletic Club, Midwick, California Yacht Club and the Uplifters.

=== Death ===
After an illness of some fifteen months, Baker died on January 9, 1927, in his suite at the Gaylord Apartments, 3355 Wilshire Boulevard, the diagnosis being heart disease. Cremation was at Forest Lawn Cemetery.

== Public service ==
In July 1896 Baker was a member of a committee to plan the reorganization of the city government. And four days after the start of the Spanish–American War, he sent a telegram on behalf of the Merchants and Manufacturers Association to California Senator Stephen M. White stating:

Whereas, the city of Los Angeles is totally without any defenses and absolutely at the mercy of invading forces no matter how small in number[,] Resolved that the Secretary of War be strongly urged to garrison Los Angeles with a battery of rapid-firing guns.

Baker, a Republican, was elected to represent the 2nd Ward on the Los Angeles City Council in December 1896 and was re-elected in 1898, for four years altogether.

In December 1898, Baker was appointed to a businessmen's committee authorized to call on "Lumbermen, Manufacturers, Packinghouses, etc." to gather funds on behalf of the Nicaragua Canal Association of Southern California.

Baker was a member of the Board of Water Commissioners at the time of the building of the Los Angeles Aqueduct.

== Vocation ==
=== Foundry ===
Baker began work as an apprentice in Los Angeles machine shops, in both mechanical and office positions. He continued with the foundry and machine shop Milo S. Baker & Co., established by his father and James C. Bower. He progressed in responsibility and took over as president when his father died.

Upon Baker's return from a buying, recruitment and inspection trip to the East in October 1900, he predicted the re-election of Republican President William McKinley, which, with the continuation of prosperity, would enable him to "more than double the capacity of the Baker Iron Works", which, he said, was "the largest of its kind in the country." He said that "there is no more possibility of the election of [Democrat William Jennings] Bryan this or any other year than there is of my succeeding the Emperor of Germany.

=== Mount Lowe Railway ===
In 1896 Baker took over as general manager of the Mount Lowe Railway, a tourist attraction running up and down the side of a mountain overlooking Los Angeles and Pasadena. It was, said an article in the Los Angeles Times, an initiative to put the railroad "on a paying basis" and "the prospect at this time is excellent for the complete carrying out of the programme as originally outlined." The reorganization took place at a meeting of the railway's principal creditors where Baker, J.M. Johnson and I.B. Newton were added to the board of directors.

Mr. Baker will, from now until the debts of the concern are paid, have the actual management of the railroad as may recommend themselves to his judgment. He is a mechanical engineer, and as head of the Baker Iron Works has demonstrated his ability to organize and secure the best results from big enterprises.

In April 1897, a gathering of the unsecured creditors appointed another three-man committee, including Baker, J.M. Johnston of the Union Metal and Hardware Company and L.E. Mosher of the Los Angeles Times, to meet with a committee of bondholders under a power of attorney "to settle or compromise all unsecured claims against the railway."

=== Maritime ===
In 1916 he joined in a project to construct a shipbuilding and maritime repair yard at the Los Angeles Harbor, an enterprise that became the Los Angeles Shipbuilding and Dry Dock Company. With the end of World War I, the yard was partially converted into a lumber manufacturing facility, "with its own ships to carry raw material from Graham Island, Canada." That venture led Baker to form the Los Angeles Steamship Company.

Two years later, during World War I, Baker declared in a speech to "the joint technical societies" that:

We shipbuilders are none of us in the game for profit. What we want is production. We are all just one great big body with nothing else to do but get together and produce for the government and the winning of the war. The President of the United States and the War Board have said there shall be no strikes or walk-outs during the period of the war. Any man who stands outside your gate and t tells your men to walk out is a traitor. I hope some day to see a maximum as well as a minimum wage paid to workers, for I believe that every man should be paid a living wage. From then on he ought to be paid in proportion to what his brain and industry can earn for him.

In 1918 Baker appeared before the City Council to ask it to pay for a new road at the harbor leading to his plant, which he said had $54 million worth of contracts with the government's Emergency Fleet Corporation.

The next year, 1919, Baker's Los Angeles Shipbuilding and Dry Dock Company was hit with a strike by 2,200 of its 6,000 employees. Baker said he was willing to meet with Mayor Frederic T. Woodman to discuss the strike but that he would "not meet with anyone coming from labor-union circles."

Baker established two shipping firms, Los Angeles Pacific Navigation and Los Angeles Steamship, and announced to a meeting of Chinatown businessmen in September 1920 that a new $15 million line would be set up by "Los Angeles men and your progressive merchants in China."

In 1922, Baker was associated with Earl M. Leaf in the old firm, Los Angeles Shipbuilding and Dry Dock, It commissioned the reconstruction of two ships, City of Los Angeles and City of Honolulu, for travel between California and Hawaii.

After departing on its maiden voyage, City of Honolulu caught fire around 5:30 a.m. on October 12, 1922, in mid-Pacific, some 670 mi (1,080 km) from Los Angeles. The captain ordered everyone to the lifeboats after it became apparent that the fire could not be brought under control. None of the passengers or crew were killed or seriously injured during either the firefighting attempts or the orderly evacuation of the liner. The passengers were rescued by the freighter West Faralon, the first ship on the scene, and were transferred to the U.S. Army transport ship Thomas for passage to Los Angeles. The City of Honolulu, which was eventually scuttled by U.S. Coast Guard guns, was replaced by the President Harrison.

Baker was named to the new position of chairman of the board of Los Angeles Shipbuilding and Dry Dock in 1924, as well as to the same position with Los Angeles Lumber Products Co. Earl M. Leaf became president of all the associated companies.

== Advocacy ==
=== Business ===
Baker was a part of the Manufacturers' Association in Los Angeles before it merged with the Merchants' Association to become the Merchants' and Manufacturers' Association, of which he was elected president in 1898. He was the first president of the Founders' and Employers' Association, later known as the Metal Trades Manufacturers' Association, which worked on behalf of maintaining the open shop in Los Angeles. He served until 1911.

=== Auto Club ===
Baker helped organize the Automobile Club of Southern California, serving as its president from 1910 until 1920. One of the club's campaigns, in 1914, was to prohibit the use of firearms on public highways because of the destruction wrought to directional signs erected by the Auto Club on roadsides. Baker said the matter had been "precipitated" by the "recent defacing of the transcontinental metal signs in the Cajon Pass, where motorists from the East will have their first glimpse of the Southern California roads which have made this part of the State famous." In a newspaper column he said that the club maintained 7,600 signs over 5,000 miles of road.

Another project favored by Baker was his suggestion to take sand from the Los Angeles River bed and spread it over city streets during rainy weather. He said that in London, England, it had "become the custom for the Boy Scouts, during foggy or rainy weather, to spread out over the city, sprinkling the streets with a thin film of sand, which they carry in bags strapped to their backs," but he suggested that in Los Angeles "the sand be spread on the … streets by means of a whirling sand spray attached to a light automobile truck."
