= Greyhound (disambiguation) =

The Greyhound is a breed of dog.

Greyhound, grayhound, and related variant terms can also refer to:

== Long-distance bus companies ==
- Greyhound Australia
- Greyhound Canada, which was established as Canadian Greyhound Coaches Limited in 1929 and acquired by Greyhound US in 1940
- Greyhound Lines, United States
- Greyhound Mexico
- Greyhound Motors, Bristol, England, which operated between 1921 and 1972 (from 1935 as Bristol Greyhound)
- Greyhound UK, which operated between 2009 and 2015
- Western Greyhound, Cornwall, England, which operated between 1998 and 2015

=== Former operators associated with Greyhound Lines (USA) ===
- Atlantic Greyhound Lines
- Dixie Greyhound Lines
- Florida Greyhound Lines
- Southeastern Greyhound Lines
- Teche Greyhound Lines
- Tennessee Coach Company, an independent carrier which cooperated with Atlantic GL and Southeastern GL (1928–56)
- The Greyhound Corporation

== Other transportation ==
- Greyhound Air, an airline company owned by Greyhound Canada from 1996 to 1997
- HMS Greyhound, the name of various British Royal Navy ships
- M8 Greyhound, armoured car used by the Allies during World War II
- Greyhound was one of the GWR 3031 Class locomotives that were built for and ran on the Great Western Railway between 1891 and 1915
- USS Greyhound, the name of various United States Navy ships
- Greyhound (automobile company), a defunct cyclecar company in the United States
- C-2 Greyhound, a cargo plane

=== Fictional transportation ===
- Greyhound, codename of a fictional World War II warship in the 2020 war film Greyhound

== Music ==
- Greyhound (band), a British reggae ensemble
- Greyhoundz, a Filipino rock band
- Greyhounds (band), an American band
- "Greyhound" (song), by Swedish House Mafia, 2012
- "Greyhound", a song by Ashton Irwin from Superbloom, 2020
- "Greyhound", a song by Calpurnia from Scout, 2018
- "Greyhound", a song by John Vanderslice from Life and Death of an American Fourtracker, 2002

== Sports ==
- East High School Grayhounds, Duluth, Minnesota, USA; secondary school sports team
- Indianapolis Greyhounds, the athletic teams of the University of Indianapolis
- Sault Ste. Marie Greyhounds, an OHL major-junior hockey team
- Greyhound (horse), standardbred harness-racing racehorse

== Other ==
- Greyhound (film), a 2020 war film featuring World War II naval warfare and starring Tom Hanks
- Greyhounds (police), a police special operation group in the Andhra Pradesh state of India
- Greyhound (cocktail), commonly made from gin and grapefruit juice
- Greyhound Recycling, a recycling company in Ireland
- Greyhound Electronics, a defunct amusement games manufacturer in New Jersey
- Pantsir-S1 air defense system, whose NATO reporting name is SA-22 Greyhound

== See also ==
- Hound (disambiguation)
- Grey (disambiguation)
- Gray (disambiguation)
