= USS Greyhound =

USS Greyhound has been the name of more than one United States Navy ship, and may refer to:

- USS Greyhound (1822), a schooner purchased in 1822 and sold in 1824
- USS Greyhound (SP-437), a patrol boat in commission from 1917 to 1919
- SS Yale (1906) a commercial steamer launched in 1906 which was in commission as the troop transport USS Yale (ID-1672) from 1918 to 1919 and as the troop transport USS Greyhound (IX-106) from 1943 to 1944

== See also ==
- Greyhound (disambiguation)
