= USS Solace (AH-5) =

Hospital ship of the United States Navy

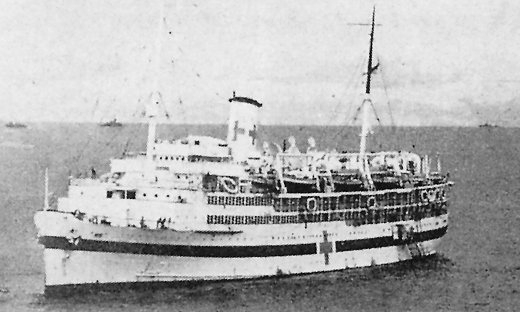
- USS Solace

History

United States
- Name: Solace
- Builder: Newport News Shipbuilding and Drydock Co., Newport News, Virginia
- Launched: 11 December 1926
- Acquired: 22 July 1940
- Commissioned: 9 August 1941
- Decommissioned: 27 March 1946
- Stricken: 21 May 1946
- Identification: IMO number: 5018131
- Honors and awards: 7 battle stars (World War II)
- Fate: Sold for commercial service, 16 April 1948, Scrapped 1981

General characteristics
- Type: Hospital ship
- Displacement: 8,900 long tons (9,000 t)
- Length: 409 ft 4 in (124.76 m)
- Beam: 62 ft (19 m)
- Draft: 20 ft 7 in (6.27 m)
- Speed: 18 kn (21 mph; 33 km/h)
- Capacity: 418 patients
- Complement: 466

The second USS Solace (AH-5) was built in 1927 as the passenger ship SS Iroquois by the Newport News Shipbuilding and Drydock Co., Newport News, Virginia. The liner was acquired by the Navy from the Clyde Mallory Steamship Line on 22 July 1940, renamed Solace (AH-5); converted into a hospital ship at the Atlantic Basin Iron Works, Brooklyn, N.Y., and was commissioned on 9 August 1941, Captain Benjamin Perlman in command.

== Service history ==
From July till December 1931 the ship was chartered by the Los Angeles Steamship Company to fill the gap left by the sinking of the Harvard in the Los Angeles-San Francisco-San Diego ferry route. Iroquois passed through the Panama Canal on 22 June and back on 17 December.

=== World War II ===
Solace was at Pearl Harbor during the attack of 7 December 1941. As an unarmed hospital ship, she was unable to participate in defending against the Japanese aircraft. A crew member filming from the deck of that ship, an Army medical doctor named Eric Haakenson, captured the precise moment of USS Arizona's explosion. She immediately sent her motor launches with stretcher parties to the stricken and burning battleship Arizona to evacuate the wounded, and pulled men from the water which was covered in burning oil. After several trips to Arizona and West Virginia, the boat crews then assisted Oklahoma. Honoring the rules of the Geneva Convention, the attacking Japanese aircraft did not hit Solace due to her white paint and red crosses. She was one of the few ships not damaged during the attack.

In March 1942, Solace was ordered to the South Pacific and proceeded to Pago Pago, Samoa. From there, she sailed to the Tonga Islands, arrived at Tongatapu on 15 April, and remained there until 4 August. On that day, she got underway and steamed, via Nouméa, New Caledonia, to New Zealand. She arrived at Auckland on the 19th and discharged her patients. From then until May 1943, Solace shuttled between New Zealand, Australia, New Caledonia, Espiritu Santo, the New Hebrides, and the Fiji Islands, caring for fleet casualties and servicemen wounded in the island campaigns under desperate circumstances. For example, on 14 January 1943, one hospital corpsman and 99 patients were transferred aboard from U.S. Advanced Hospital Base Button at Espiritu Santo with 369 patients already on board, far exceeding official patient capacity. Patients whom she could not return to duty shortly were evacuated to hospitals for more prolonged care.

From June–August, she operated as a station hospital ship at Nouméa. On 30 August, Solace sailed to Efate, New Hebrides, and performed the same duties at that port until sailing for Auckland on 3 October. On the 22nd, the hospital ship departed New Zealand and proceeded via Pearl Harbor to the west coast of the United States. She arrived at San Francisco on 9 November; disembarked her patients; and, on the 12th, sailed for the Gilberts.

Solace arrived at Abemama Island on the 24th, embarked casualties from the Tarawa campaign, sailed the same day for Hawaii, and arrived at Pearl Harbor on 2 December.

On 17 December, Solace sailed from Oahu with embarked patients to be evacuated to the U.S. She arrived at San Diego on 23 December 1943.

Solace remained in San Diego until she sailed on 15 January 1944 for the Marshall Islands. She arrived at Roi on 3 February and departed the next day with a load of wounded for Pearl Harbor. She was there for one day, returned to Roi on 18 February, then proceeded toward Eniwetok on the 21st. After picking up 391 casualties (of whom 125 had been brought by landing craft directly from the beachheads at Eniwetok and Parry Island), she returned to Pearl Harbor on 3 March.

Solace was next ordered to Espiritu Santo and arrived there on 20 March. During the next nine weeks, she shuttled between New Guinea, the Admiralty Islands, and Australia. She was back at Roi on 6 June and departed there nine days later for the Marianas. The hospital ship anchored in Charan-Kanoa Anchorage, Saipan, on 18 June. While the shores and hills were still under bombardment, she began taking on battle casualties, many directly from the front lines. When she sailed for Guadalcanal on the 20th, all of her hospital beds were filled, and there were patients in the crew's quarters. Altogether, the ship was caring for 584 men. Solace returned to Saipan from 2–5 July and embarked another load of wounded whom she took to the Solomons. From there, she was routed to the Marshalls arriving at Eniwetok on the 19th. Two days later, she sailed for Guam. Between 24 and 26 July, she took on board wounded from various ships and the beachhead for evacuation to Kwajalein. Solace was back at Guam from 5–15 August where she picked up 502 casualties for evacuation to Pearl Harbor.

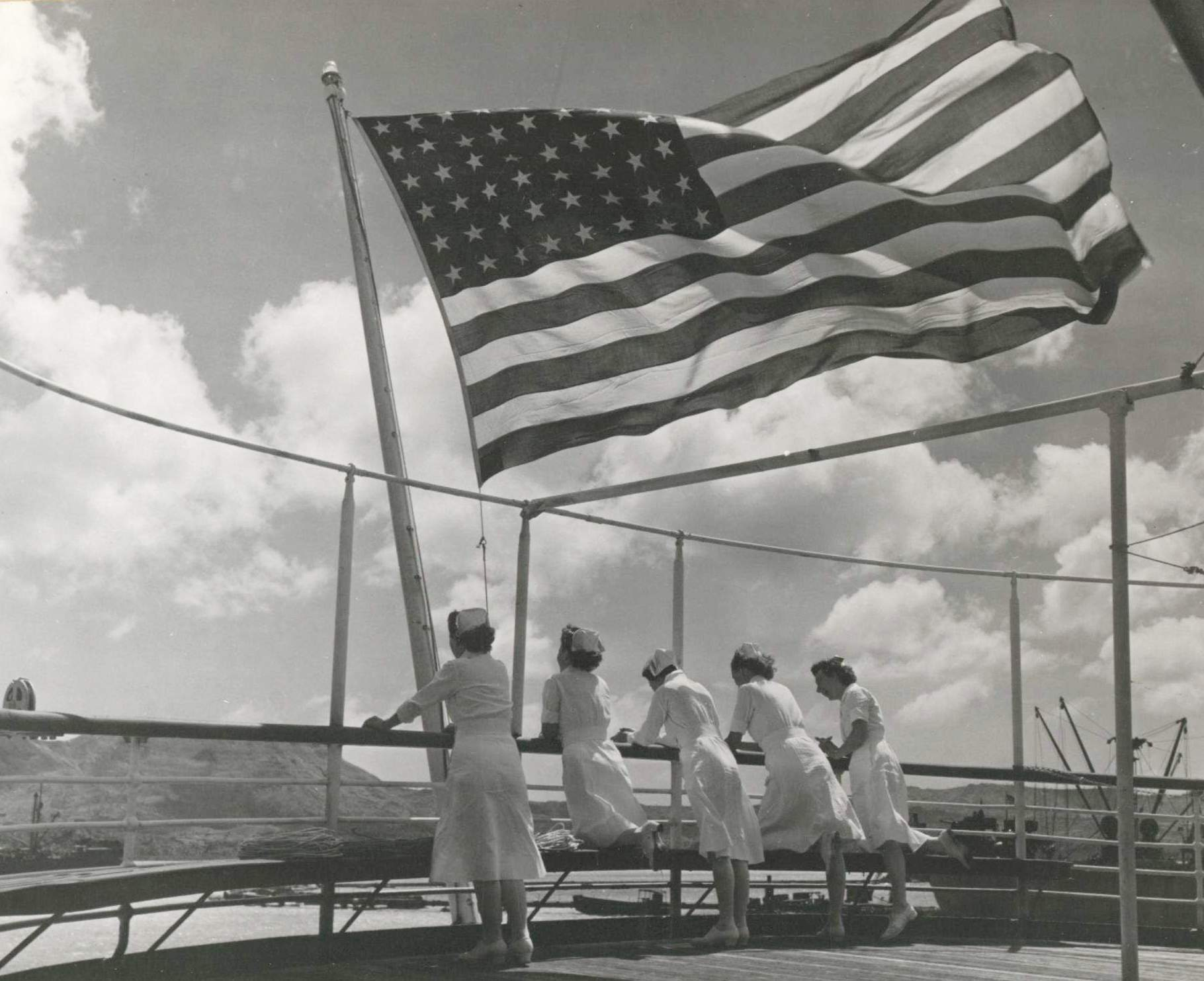
Navy nurses aboard USS Solace in the Pacific, 1945 (BUMED)

Solace was at Pearl Harbor from 26 August – 7 September, when she left for the Marshalls. She arrived at Eniwetok on the 14th. Three days later, she was ordered to sail immediately for the Palaus. She arrived off Peleliu on the 22nd, anchored 2,000 yd (1,800 m) from the beach, and began loading wounded. All stretcher cases (542) were put on board Solace. She headed for Nouméa on the 25th and arrived on 4 October. The ship was back at Peleliu from 16 to 27 October tending wounded and then sailed to Manus.

Solace stood out of Seeadler Harbor on 29 October, bound for the Caroline Islands. From 1 November 1944 – 18 February 1945, she served as a station hospital ship at Ulithi, providing medical and dental care for the 3rd and 5th Fleets. She proceeded to Guam and was dispatched from there to Iwo Jima, arriving on 23 February. Solace anchored within 2,000 yards (1,800 m) of the beach, but enemy shells fell within 100 yd (91 m) of her, and she was forced to move further out. The first wounded were brought on board within 45 minutes of her arrival, and she sailed for Saipan the next day, loaded to capacity. She made three evacuation trips from Iwo Jima to base hospitals at Guam and Saipan, carrying almost 2,000 patients, by 12 March. The island was declared secure on the 15th.

Solace steamed to Ulithi and joined the invasion fleet for Okinawa Gunto. She arrived at Kerama Retto on the morning of 27 March and began bringing patients on board from various ships. In the next three months, the ship evacuated seven loads of casualties to the Marianas. On 1 July, she sailed from Guam to the west coast, via Pearl Harbor. Solace arrived at San Francisco on 22 July and was routed to Portland, Oregon, for an overhaul that lasted until 12 September. She was then assigned to "Operation Magic Carpet", transporting homecoming veterans from Pearl Harbor to San Francisco. She returned to San Francisco from her last voyage on 16 January 1946 and was routed to Hampton Roads, Virginia.

== Decommissioning and sale ==
Solace was decommissioned at Norfolk on 27 March 1946, struck from the Navy List on 21 May, and returned to the War Shipping Administration on 18 July. She was sold to the Turkish Maritime Lines on 16 April 1948 and operated as SS Ankara.

During the dismantling of SS Ankara, the workers who were not aware of the history of the ship, discovered a large amount of lead covering a room, which was uncommon for a cruise ship. It was the x-ray room of USS Solace. The scrapped lead was moved to the construction of Corlulu Ali Pasha mosque in Halic, Istanbul, to build the dome of the fountain.

== Awards ==
Solace received seven battle stars for World War II service.

== See also ==
- SS Shawnee - sister ship
