= SS Shawnee =

US and Yugoslav ship

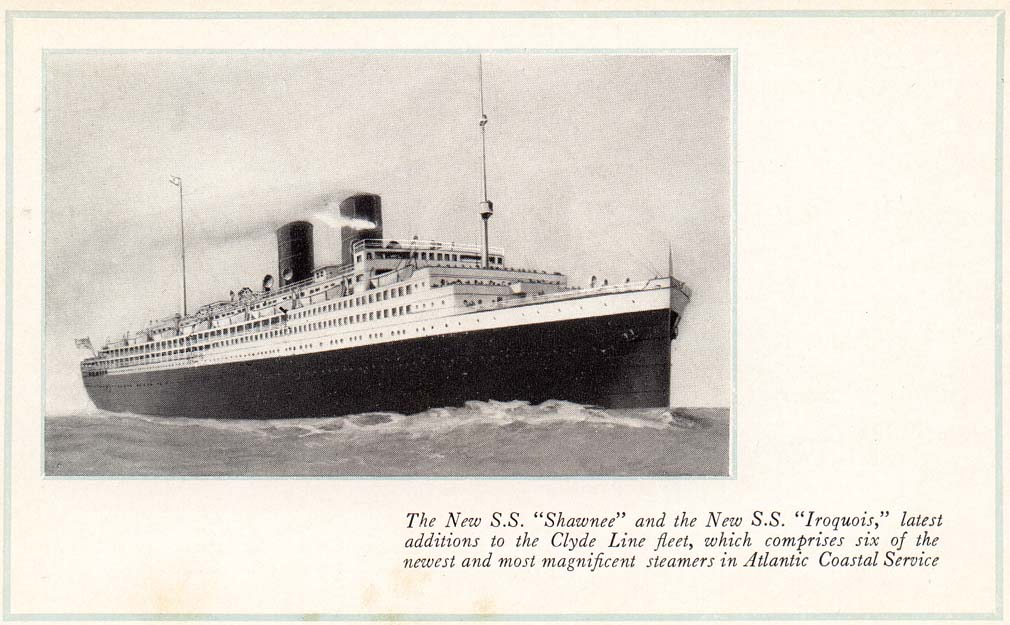
- Iroquois and Shawnee

History
- Name: Shawnee (1927–1947); City of Lisbon (Mar–Sep 1947); Partizanka (1947–1949)
- Namesake: Shawnee (1927–1947); Lisbon (Mar–Sep 1947); Yugoslav Partisans (1947–1949)
- Owner: Clyde-Mallory Line (1927–1947); Iberian Star Line (1946–1947); Jugoslavenska Linijska Plovidba (1947–1949)
- Port of registry: (United States) New York (1927–1947); Panama City (Mar–Sep 1947); (Socialist Federal Republic of Yugoslavia) Rijeka (1947–1949)
- Builder: Newport News Shipbuilding & Drydock Co, Newport News
- Yard number: 307
- Laid down: 15 May 1926
- Launched: 18 April 1927
- Sponsored by: Miss Eleanor Hoyt
- Completed: 21 July 1927
- Maiden voyage: 27 July 1927
- Identification: US official number 226696; Code letters MGNR (1928–1933); Call sign WOBG (1934–1947); Call sign YTAP (1947–1949)
- Fate: Fire, 12 August 1949

General characteristics
- Type: ocean liner
- Tonnage: 6,209 GRT; 3,405 NRT
- Displacement: 8,500 long tons (8,636 t)
- Length: 407 ft 3 in (124.1 m) overall; 394.7 ft (120.3 m) registered
- Beam: 62.2 ft (19.0 m)
- Depth: 19.4 ft (5.9 m)
- Decks: 2
- Installed power: 4 x steam turbines, 2,246 nhp, 8,500 shp
- Propulsion: single reduction geared to 2 x screws
- Speed: 19 knots (35 km/h)
- Capacity: 723 passengers
- Crew: 174

Shawnee was a steam turbine-powered ocean liner, built in 1926-1927 by Newport News Ship Building & Drydock Co. of Newport News for Clyde Steamship Company, a subsidiary of Atlantic, Gulf & West Indies Steamship Lines (AGWI Lines) with intention of operating between New York and southern ports of the United States. During the World War II, she was requisitioned by the US Government, and served as the United States Army Transport from September 1942 to March 1946 in the Atlantic, Mediterranean and Pacific. After the end of the war, she was sold to a Portuguese company and renamed City of Lisbon. A few months later she was sold to the Yugoslav shipping company Jugoslavenska Linijska Plovidba, who renamed her Partizanka. In 1949 she burned while in drydock, and was declared a total loss.

== Design and construction ==
Early in 1925, Clyde Steamship Co. inaugurated an ambitious shipbuilding program designed to augment their cargo and passenger carrying capabilities between New York, Carolinas and Florida. Six new liners were ordered, starting with Mohawk and ending with Shawnee, for a total cost of about US$14,000,000. Four ships of the program were similar to Mohawk, but the last two, Iroquois and Shawnee, were bigger and more luxurious passenger liners. The contract for all these ships was awarded to the Newport News Ship Building & Drydock Co.

Shawnee was laid down in Newport News as yard number 307 on 15 May 1926. She was launched on 18 April 1927, with Miss Eleanor Hoyt of New York, as her sponsor. She was primarily designed for passenger transportation, and was built for speed being able to cover the distance between New York and Jacksonville in less than two days. She had four passenger decks, two of which were designed as glass-enclosed promenades. She had berths in single cabins and suites for 723 passengers, all of which had private baths, running hot and cold water and electric lights, with interior decorations designed and created by a nationally renowned interior designer Herbert R. Stone. An observatory and a library on the upper deck, a tea room, a dancing deck, a smoking lounge, a barber shop, and a spacious dining hall able to sit 250 people at once were also built to entertain her passengers. Shawnee had electric lights in suites and along the decks, and was also equipped with wireless telegraphy. She had cargo decks separated into ventilated watertight and fire-proof holds, 37,100 cubic feet (1,051 m^{3}) of which were chilled with refrigerating machinery to carry fruit and vegetables from southern states. Space was also specially designed to transport automobiles, for passengers could bring their autos with them. She was equipped with oil-burning machinery, and fuel bunker tanks of 7,920 barrels capacity.

She was 394.7 feet (120.3 m) long (between perpendiculars) and 62.2 feet (19.0 m) abeam, and had a depth of 19.4 feet (5.9 m). Shawnee was assessed at 6,209 GRT and 3,405 NRT and had loaded displacement of 8,500 long tons (8,636 t). She had a steel hull with double bottom, boilers with oil-burning furnaces, and four steam turbines, producing 8,500 shp of power, single reduction geared to two screw propellers, that gave her a speed of 19 knots (22 mph; 35 km/h).

After an inspection, the ship was transferred to her owners on July 21 and left for New York in the evening of the same day.

== Operational history ==
Shawnee and Iroquois operated schedules along the Atlantic coast of North America from New York, visiting as far north as Quebec, Montreal, and Halifax, with main service south to Florida and Galveston, and occasional cruises into the Caribbean. On 13 September 1939 Shawnee, chartered by the government through United States Lines for one round trip voyage from New York to Bordeaux, was one of five ships along with Acadia, Iroquois, Orizaba, and St. John that were used to evacuate stranded US citizens from France.

AGWI Lines delivered Shawnee in New Orleans on 18 December 1941 to the War Shipping Administration (WSA), but continued to operate her for the Army under a WSA agreement.

=== US Army Transport ===
On 20 September 1942 WSA allocated the ship to the United States Army, which operated the ship as US Army Transport (USAT) Shawnee under bareboat charter until returned to WSA on 4 March 1946, and control returned to the line on 14 June 1946.

Immediately after delivery in New Orleans, the ship was converted for troop transport at Todd-Johnson Shipyards. After conversion, Shawnee began transport between New Orleans and the Canal Zone, making four trips, the last one with 594 interned aliens. After a month undergoing repairs, the ship began reinforcement in May 1942 of Caribbean bases at San Juan, Jamaica, Trinidad and Panama. The next operation was from New Orleans to Panama, Arica and Callao. After passing through Panama, she went to New York, where the Army took over full operation on 20 September 1942 under a bareboat charter from WSA, to formally become USAT Shawnee.

The ship underwent major repairs until leaving in January 1943 for Oran which had been captured as an Allied port during the North African landings in November. With a return to Boston and then operating out of New York, Shawnee operated in the North Atlantic to British ports and North Africa until early 1944.

After a stop in New Orleans, the ship transited to the Pacific and ports in the South Pacific and Southwest Pacific (SWPA) areas of operations until return to San Francisco, the major Army Port of Embarkation for the Pacific in April. From there she made one trip to New Guinea with a return for repairs, and then a round trip between Seattle and Honolulu. In July 1944, Shawnee returned to SWPA and became a part of the command's permanent local fleet, with the SWPA identification number X-127. (Note: Ships retained or acquired in SWPA were given "X" numbers" in 1942 that were changed to "Y" numbers later in the war. The numbers were administrative numbers but not as usual with the Navy prominently displayed on hulls.) In SWPA the ship was used for support of operations from Australia into the island campaigns from New Guinea northward. At one point, Shawnee was considered for use as an Army hospital, ship because her passenger configuration had suitable large spaces for hospital operations. There are indications the ship was used locally as an ambulance transport – a troop transport that carried troops outbound and wounded on return – with one reference citing an official report of a voyage "aboard the Station Hospital USAT Shawnee", but the ship was never formally designated hospital ship by the Army or officially for immunity from attack. The ship visited many of the notable locations of that theater of war including Guadalcanal, though the battles there were over, Bougainville, and Leyte.

Early in 1945, the ship was released from the SWPA fleet and was repaired at San Francisco, leaving in May for Honolulu. From there she operated in the central Pacific with stops at Eniwetok and Ulithi, and SWPA areas of Leyte, Manila, and Samar. In December 1945 the ship left from Hawaii for New York, where she was returned to the WSA and AGWI Lines on 4 March 1946. She was then laid up in New York.

=== City of Lisbon (March–September 1947) ===
The ship was sold by AGWI Lines in 1946, though Maritime Commission records show actual sale on 11 March 1947, to a Panama entity which re-registered the ship in Panama under the name City of Lisbon. Though Panamanian-registered, she was owned by a Portuguese company, the Iberian Star Line, and operated out of Portugal. On 28 May 1947 City of Lisbon was damaged in a collision with the cargo ship Virgolin. Though intended for scrapping, the owners sold the ship to Yugoslavia.

=== Partizanka (1947–1949) ===
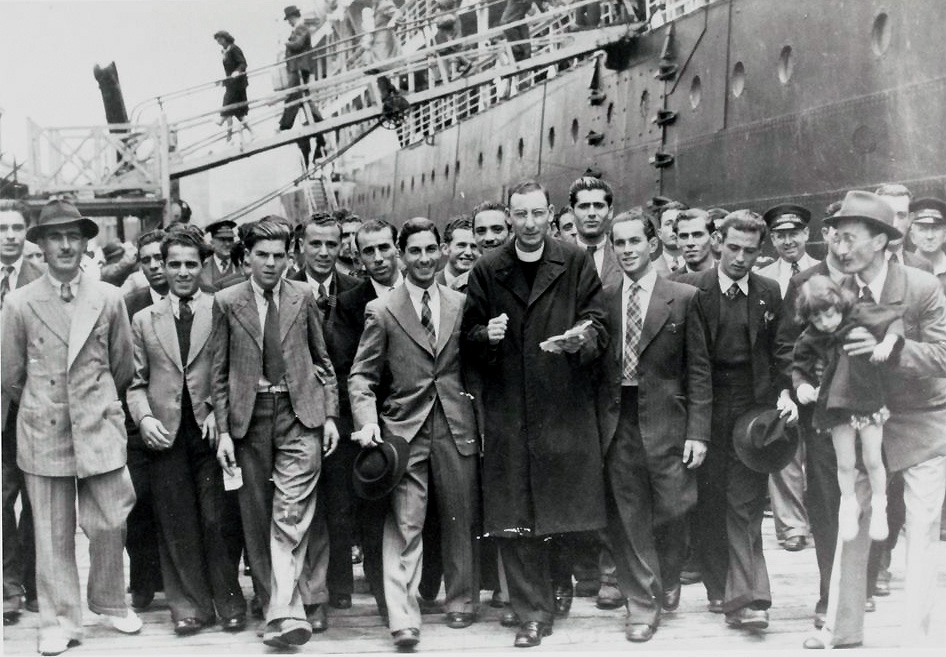
Maltese immigrants land in Sydney from Partizanka, 1948

In September 1947, Jugoslavenska Linijska Plovidba bought the ship, renamed her Partizanka, and had her converted at Rijeka to carry about 800 passengers. Portuguese sources note the diplomatic arrangements involved in Yugoslavia's acquisition of the ship.

Partizanka left Malta on 15 December 1947 for Australia, called at Fremantle 9 January 1948, and arrived Sydney 15 January with 808 migrants, including three babies born on the voyage. She left Australia for the Middle East, and then operated out of Rijeka to South America for the remainder of 1948. In March 1949 she left Trieste with a second group of migrants of 18 nationalities for Australia, arriving 6 April. The next day she left for Split. While in drydock on 12 August 1949, she burned and was declared a total loss.

Some of the immigrants to Australia were from the program "Employment of Scientific and Technical Enemy Aliens", which was aimed by Australia to recruit Germans.

== See also ==
- SS Iroquois (1927) – sister ship
