= SS Yale (1906) =

U.S. passenger steamship

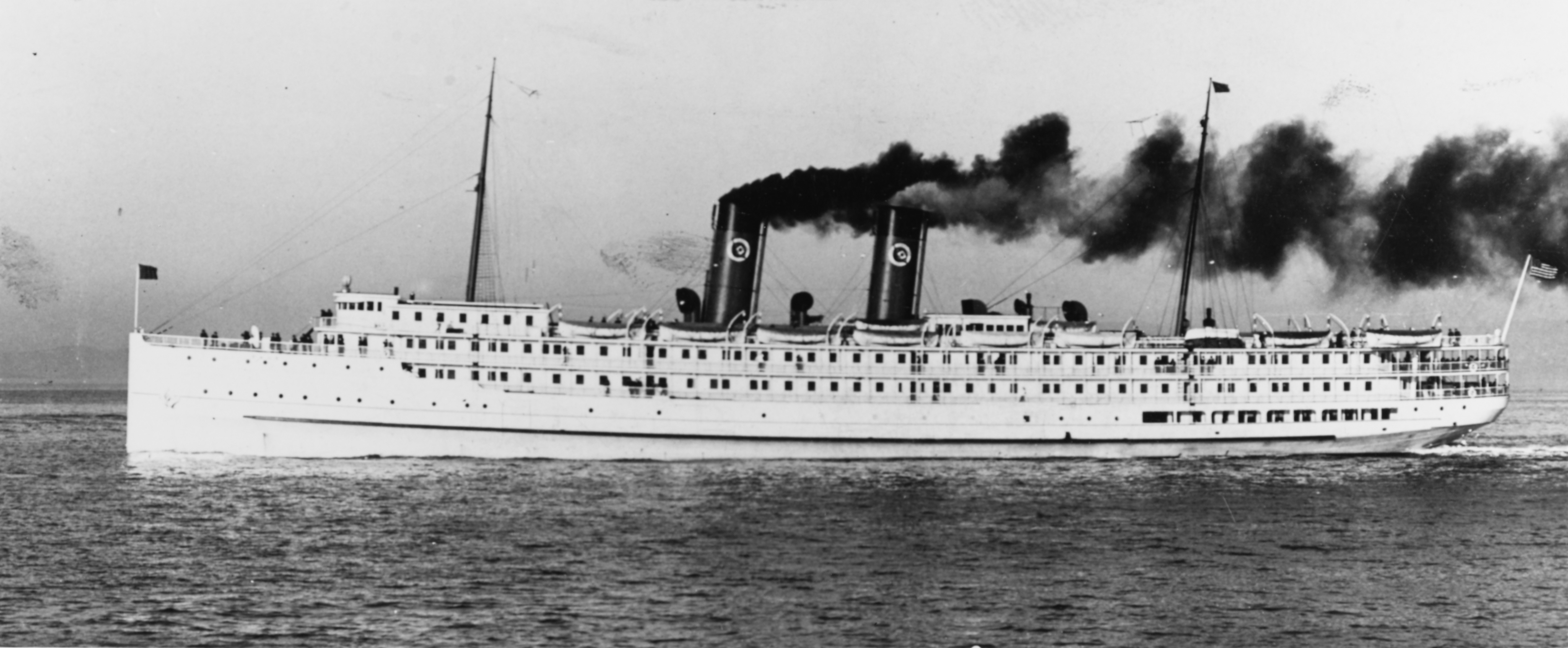
- Yale underway before World War I

History

United States
- Name: Yale
- Namesake: Yale University
- Builder: Delaware River Iron Shipbuilding and Engine Works
- Cost: $1,750,000
- Laid down: 1906
- Launched: 1 December 1906
- Commissioned: 25 March 1918
- Decommissioned: 1920
- Reclassified: ID-1672
- Recommissioned: 8 August 1943
- Decommissioned: 31 March 1944
- Out of service: 9 March 1948
- Stricken: 18 June 1948
- Fate: Sold for scrap 5 June 1949

General characteristics
- Type: Coastal passenger liner
- Tonnage: 3,731 GRT
- Length: 407 ft (124 m)
- Beam: 61.3 ft (18.7 m)
- Draft: 18 ft (5.5 m)
- Installed power: 5,000 hp
- Propulsion: 2 × steam turbines, 2 screws
- Speed: 15 knots (28 km/h)
- Capacity: 800

SS Yale was a 3,731 GRT coastal passenger steamship, was built by the Delaware River Iron Shipbuilding and Engine Works in 1906, for service between New York and Boston. In March 1918 the US Navy acquired her from the Pacific Steamship Company of Seattle, Washington, placing her in commission later in that month as USS Yale (ID-1672).

USS Yale served between March 1918 and September 1919. In World War I, the ship made 31 round-trip voyages transporting troops between Britain and France. Yale was decommissioned in early September 1919 and, in June 1920, together with her sister ship Harvard sold for commercial operation along the Pacific Coast between San Francisco and Los Angeles. The Los Angeles Steamship Company spent $8,000,000 to turn the troop ships into high-speed luxury liners, able to make the one way trip in 18 hours.

== World War II ==
After 15 years of fast passenger service along the West Coast, Yale was laid up in 1935; in 1940 the national emergency resulting from the outbreak of World War II in Europe brought her back into use. She was used this time as a dormitory ship in Alaskan waters. The United States Navy again acquired her in April 1943 and in August she was commissioned as USS Greyhound (IX-106) on 8 August 1943. She was the third ship of the United States Navy to be named for the greyhound, a breed of tall, slender, swift hound with a narrow pointed head.

After brief service Greyhound decommissioned on 31 March 1944, and began duty as a floating barracks for personnel at various Puget Sound training schools. She was placed out of service on 9 March 1948 and her name was struck 18 June 1948. She was turned over to the Maritime Commission 12 November 1948 and placed with the National Defense Reserve Fleet at Olympia, Washington until 5 June 1949 when she was sold for scrapping. She departed Olympia on 13 July 1949, towed by the Red Stack tug Hercules, bound for the Walter W. Johnson Company scrap yard at Stockton, California, where she was due to arrive 18 July. The salvaged steel was to go to the Columbia steel mill at Pittsburg, California.

== Sources ==
- Naval Historical Center
- Naval Historical Center

== See also ==
- SS Harvard (1907) - sister ship
