= USS Charles =

1918–1920 American troop transport ship

Coordinates: 34°38′29.6″N 120°37′34.4″W

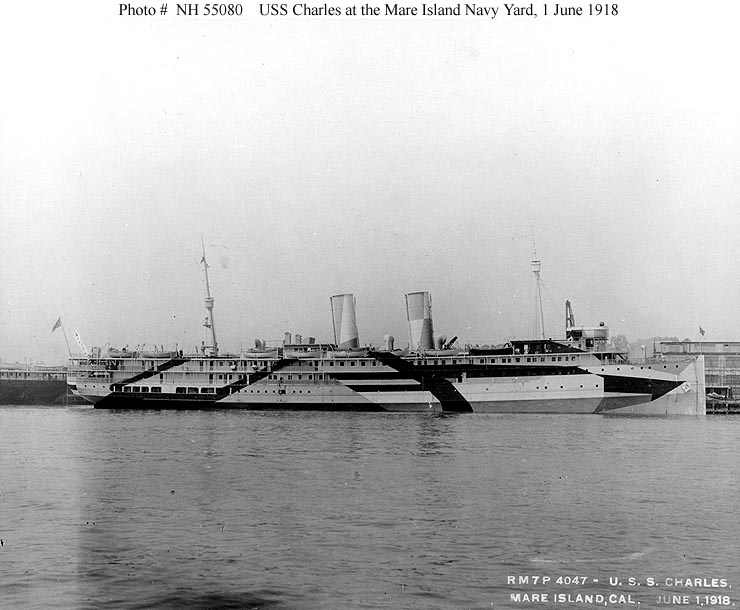
- USS Charles in dazzle camouflage. at Mare Island Navy Yard on 1 June 1918.

History

United States
- Name: SS Harvard (February 1907–9 April 1918); USS Harvard (9 April 1918–11 April 1918); USS Charles (11 April 1918–29 July 1920); USS Harvard (29 July 1920–14 October 1920); SS Harvard (14 October 1920–30 May 1931)
- Owner: Metropolitan Steamship Company (1907–1910); Pacific Steam Navigation Company (1910–1918); United States Navy (1918–1920); Los Angeles Steamship Company (1920–1930); Matson Navigation Company (1930–1931)
- Operator: Metropolitan Steamship Company (1907–1910); Pacific Steam Navigation Company (1910–1918); United States Navy (1918–1920); Los Angeles Steamship Company (1920–1931)
- Route: New York–Boston (1907–1910); Southampton–Le Havre or Boulogne (1918–1919); Los Angeles–San Francisco (1921–1931)
- Builder: Delaware River Iron Ship Building and Engine Works, Chester, PA
- Yard number: 334
- Launched: 30 January 1907
- Completed: 1907
- Acquired: Commandeered 21 March 1918; Purchased 28 August 1918
- Commissioned: 9 April 1918
- Decommissioned: 10 June 1920
- In service: 1907–1918 (Civilian service); 1918–1920 (US Navy service); 1921–1931 (Civilian service)
- Identification: Naval identification number: ID-1298
- Nickname(s): White Flyers of the Pacific (with sister Yale)
- Fate: Wrecked off California 30 May 1931

General characteristics
- Type: Troop transport
- Tonnage: 3,731 GRT or 3,737 GRT
- Length: 403 ft (123 m)
- Beam: 51.3 ft (15.6 m)
- Draft: 19 ft (5.8 m)
- Propulsion: Steam engine
- Speed: 22 knots (41 km/h; 25 mph)
- Capacity: 800 passengers
- Complement: 211

USS Charles (ID-1298) was a troop transport that served in the United States Navy from 1918 to 1920 and was briefly in commission as USS Harvard in 1918 and 1920. She was better known in her role as passenger liner SS Harvard, one of the premier West Coast steamships operated by the Los Angeles Steamship Company.

== Construction ==
The passenger ship Harvard was built in 1907 for the Metropolitan Steamship Company as Yard No. 334 by the Delaware River Iron Ship Building and Engine Works at Chester, Pennsylvania, following her sister ship Yale. She was launched on 30 January 1907 and entered service the following month.

=== Specifications ===
Harvard's registered length was 376.0 ft (114.6 m), her beam was 61.0 ft (18.6 m) and her depth was 20.0 ft (6.1 m). She was measured as 3,737 GRT and 2,817 NRT. The ship was driven by triple screw propellers, each powered by a steam turbine made by W. & A. Fletcher Company of Hoboken, New Jersey, which gave her a service speed of 21.5 knots (39.8 km/h) knots. She had a passenger capacity of 800.

== Service history ==
=== Prewar ===
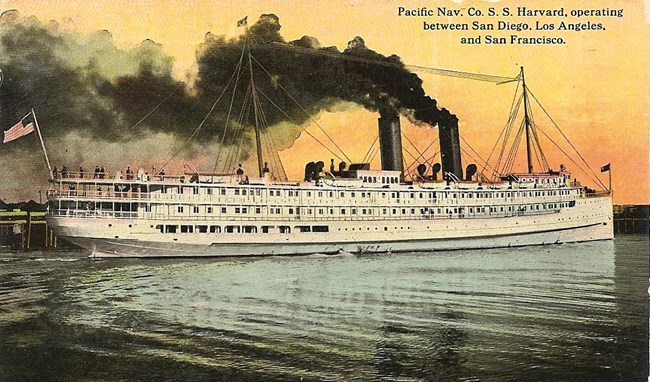
Harvard in a 1912 postcard for the Pacific Steam Navigation Company

After completion in February 1907, Harvard was placed on the New York to Boston route with her sister ship Yale.The pair were sold to the Pacific Steam Navigation Company in 1910 and brought to California. The sisters became the fastest coastal steamships operating off the state, and became nicknamed the "White Flyers of the Pacific".

=== World War I ===
The U.S. Navy commandeered her on 21 March 1918 for World War I service, assigned her the registry Identification Number (Id. No.) 1298, outfitted her for service as a troop transport at Mare Island Navy Yard at Vallejo, California, and commissioned her as USS Harvard (ID-1298) on 9 April 1918. On 11 April 1918 she was renamed USS Charles (ID-1298). The Navy later (on 28 August 1918) purchased Charles outright from her owners.

Departing Mare Island, Charles reached Hampton Roads, Virginia, on 26 June 1918. There she loaded troops and departed Newport News, Virginia, for Brest, France, on 10 July 1918. She arrived at Brest on 21 July 1918.

On 27 July 1918, Charles reported at Southampton, England, for duty as a ferry for troops crossing the English Channel. She made about 60 voyages between Southampton and Le Havre or Boulogne, France, carrying troops of all nationalities bound for action at the front during the war or for occupation duty after it ended, until 5 May 1919.

Her ferrying duties completed, Charles embarked passengers at Rotterdam in the Netherlands and at Brest for transportation to the United States, and on 15 June 1919, arrived at New York City. Her support of United States Army operations in Europe at an end, Charles arrived at the Philadelphia Navy Yard at Philadelphia, Pennsylvania on 24 July 1919, and was decommissioned there on 10 June 1920.

=== Postwar ===
Reverting to her original name, Charles was renamed USS Harvard on 29 July 1920. She was considered for conversion into a seaplane tender, but this was never carried out, and instead she was sold to the Los Angeles Steamship Company on 14 October 1920.

Both Harvard and Yale were modernized and refitted for $8,000,000. Their boilers changed to burn oil rather than coal, and ballrooms were installed aboard both ships. The pair then inaugurated the new overnight passenger and cargo ferry service between the cities of Los Angeles and San Francisco in 1921 as high-speed luxury liners. It would take about 18 hours for Harvard or her sister to make the voyage one-way.

In 1930, the Los Angeles Steamship Company was purchased by the Matson Navigation Company and became a wholly owned subsidiary.

== Sinking ==
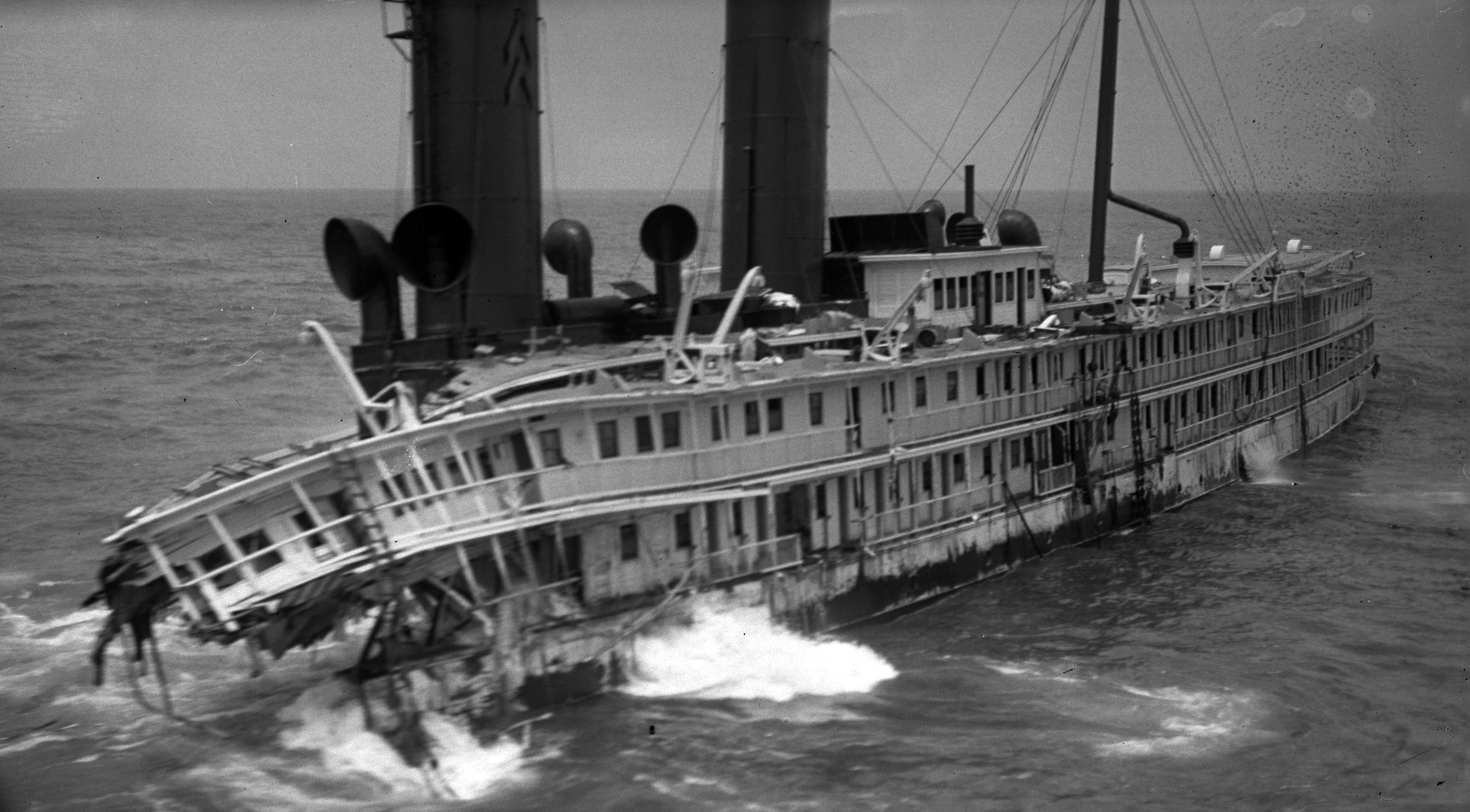
The wreck of Harvard on Point Arguello in 1931

On 30 May 1931, Harvard was sailing through heavy fog while carrying around 500 passengers. She eventually struck a reef and ran aground shortly before down at Point Arguello, California. The grounding woke nearly everyone aboard, though there was reportedly no confusion during the evacuation, the passengers agreeing "that that the wreck had been the calmest they had ever experienced or heard about."

The cruiser USS Louisville, which had been commissioned just a few months earlier, quickly arrived to take Harvard's passengers and crew. The cruiser docked in Los Angeles at 7:10 PM. The tugboat Tamaroa ran lines from herself to the steamship in hopes of refloating her, though the ship was beyond saving. Harvard's bow broke off around two weeks after being initially grounded, and she was declared a loss and was subsequently abandoned.

=== Wreck ===
Harvard lies northeast of Point Arguello in 25 feet (7.6 m) of water, roughly 1 mile (1.6 km) north of Honda Rock. All three propeller blades and all three boilers remain intact, though the ship herself is nearly completely destroyed.
