= Los Angeles Steamship Company =

Passenger and freight shipping company

House flag used by LASSCO

The Los Angeles Steamship Company or LASSCO was a passenger and freight shipping company based in Los Angeles, California.

== History ==
The company, incorporated on May 27, 1920, with a capital stock of $5,000,000 and Fred L. Baker of the Los Angeles Shipbuilding and Dry Dock Company acting as president. The early history of the company is that of the establishment of the Los Angeles - San Francisco route.

In 1921, LASSCO added service to Hawaii in competition with the San Francisco-based Matson Navigation Company using two former North German Lloyd ocean liners that had been in U.S. Navy service during World War I. Despite the sinking of one of the former German liners on her maiden voyage for the company, business in the booming 1920s thrived, and the company continued to add ships and services. In 1922, the City of Los Angeles, a renamed and refitted liner, was one of the largest American ships sailing in Pacific waters. The worsening economic conditions in the United States, and the burning of another ship in Hawaii, caused financial problems for the company. After beginning talks in 1930, the Los Angeles Steamship Company was taken over by Matson Navigation on January 1, 1931, but continued to operate as a subsidiary. The merger was announced on October 30, 1930, the new combined operation was in control of 31 ships sailing the Pacific.

In August 1933, the California Steamship Company was formed as a subsidiary of LASSCO, to operate a coastal service between San Francisco, Los Angeles and San Diego with the SS Corrales, Timberman and Coquina. The subsidiary only lasted till April 1935 and only ran with the Corrales.

Matson called for redemption on July 1, 1935, the entire $4,900,000 of mortgage bonds issued in 1931 as part of the LASSCO merger (due 1936–1940) to curtail interest payments.

LASSCO ceased operations in 1937.

== Los Angeles - San Francisco overnight (1921-) ==
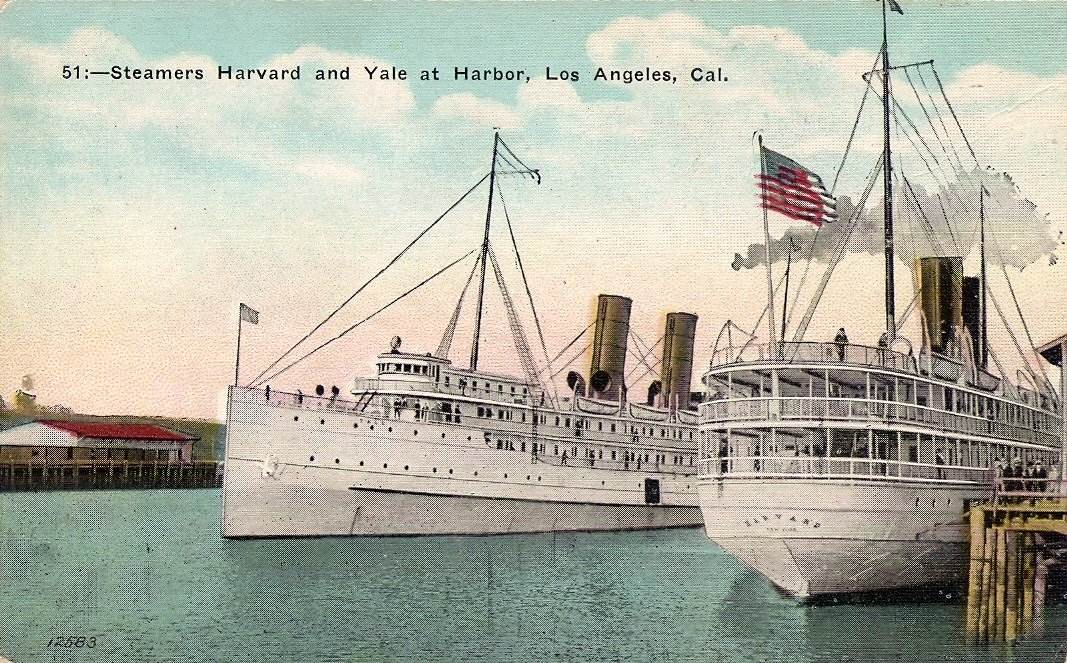
Passenger ships Harvard and Yale (postcard)

Ship	First journey	Last journey	Notes
Yale	2 May 1921		
Harvard	5 August 1921	30 May 1931	
Waimea	24 May 1923	???	
Iroquois	30 June 1931	9 December 1931	chartered

The Yale and Harvard, sister ships launched in December 1906 and January 1907 and both triple-screw steamers capable of a speed in excess of 20 knots, were to make up the fleet, expected to arrive in July 1920 from the Atlantic coast. After arrival in Los Angeles both ships were to undergo a $1,000,000 repair and alteration program. On August 24 the merger with the Los Angeles Pacific Navigation Company was announced and the size of the fleet was increased to 6. A new $100,000 terminal next to Shed 1, Pier A was built for the daily service between San Pedro and San Francisco. The terminal was reachable by Pacific Electric rail from 6th & Main Station in downtown Los Angeles. Eventually there was $8,000,000 spent on Yale and Harvard by the time they were ready for their first journey, the job was performed by the Los Angeles Shipbuilding and Dry Dock Company. The two ships were thereafter referred to as luxury liners on every occasion. According to their entries in Lloyd's register, this overhaul neither changed the principal dimensions of the ships by more than mere inches nor did it involve a replacement of the 3 steam turbines. The duration of the journey between San Pedro and San Francisco was 18 hours, i.e. overnight. The service was inaugurated with the departure of Yale from San Pedro at 3 p.m. on May 2, 1921, Harvard left San Pedro on August 5 for her first run.

With her voyage departing San Francisco on May 24, 1923, after overhaul at Hanlon, the Waimea began her once-a-week schedule on the line. Waimea was used to feed cargo to ships sailing on the Los Angeles-Hawaii line, but could also ferry 80 first-class passengers along the coast at a lower rate than Yale and Harvard. Waimea was built as the City of Topeka in 1884 by John Roach & Sons. After being laid up for two years in the Port of Los Angeles West Basin she was sold for scrap in December 1932.

With the first sailing of Yale on June 22, 1922, from San Pedro at 3 p.m. and arrival at 8 p.m, San Diego was soon added to the schedule, which in the summer of 1923 consisted of 4 sailings per week between L.A. and S.F. ($22,50 round trip) and 2 sailings per week between L.A. and San Diego ($6 round-trip). Oakland was included in the route in September 1924. In October 1925 a 24-hour store door-to-store door delivery service between San Francisco and Los Angeles was implemented in cooperation with local trucking firms, and in October 1931 extended to San Diego.

The Harvard became a total loss after she ran aground at Point Arguello on May 30, 1931.

The Iroquois, chartered from the Clyde-Mallory Line as a replacement for the Harvard, arrived from the east coast on June 29, 1931, and started service the next day, going to San Francisco. After arriving for the last time in San Pedro from San Francisco on December 9, 1931. she departed for New York the same day to return to her owners.

== Los Angeles - Hawaii (1922-) ==
The United States Shipping Board announced on December 1, 1921, that the Huron (later named the City of Honolulu) and Aeolus (City of Los Angeles), former German ships seized in World War I would be allocated to a direct steamship service between Los Angeles and Honolulu.

The City of Honolulu caught fire on October 12, 1922, while on her maiden voyage for the line and sank October 17.

The next City of Honolulu, in service since her maiden voyage on June 4, 1927, caught fire in Honolulu on May 25, 1930, and never again entered service before the ship was sent to Japan to be scrapped in 1933.

== Fleet ==
This is a list of passenger ships of the Los Angeles Steamship Company:

- sister ships Harvard (1920–1931) and Yale (1920-)
- Waimea (1923–1932)
  - purchased from the Inter-Island Steam Navigation Company (trading among the Hawaiian Islands) in March 1923
  - 210 ft long, 12 knots, 900 tons cargo capacity
  - replaced in the island trade with the SS Haleakala (1923)
- SS Calawaii (ex USAT Sherman 1899–1922, ex S.S. Mobile of Atlantic Transport Line 1892–1898, Scrapped 1933 at Osaka, Japan)
- SS City of Honolulu (I), sunk in 1922
- SS City of Honolulu (II), burned in 1930
- SS City of Los Angeles
- SS Diamond Head
