= Greyhound Recycling =

Irish waste collection and recycling company

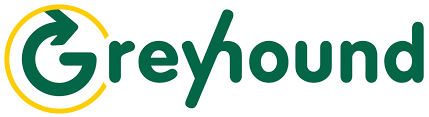

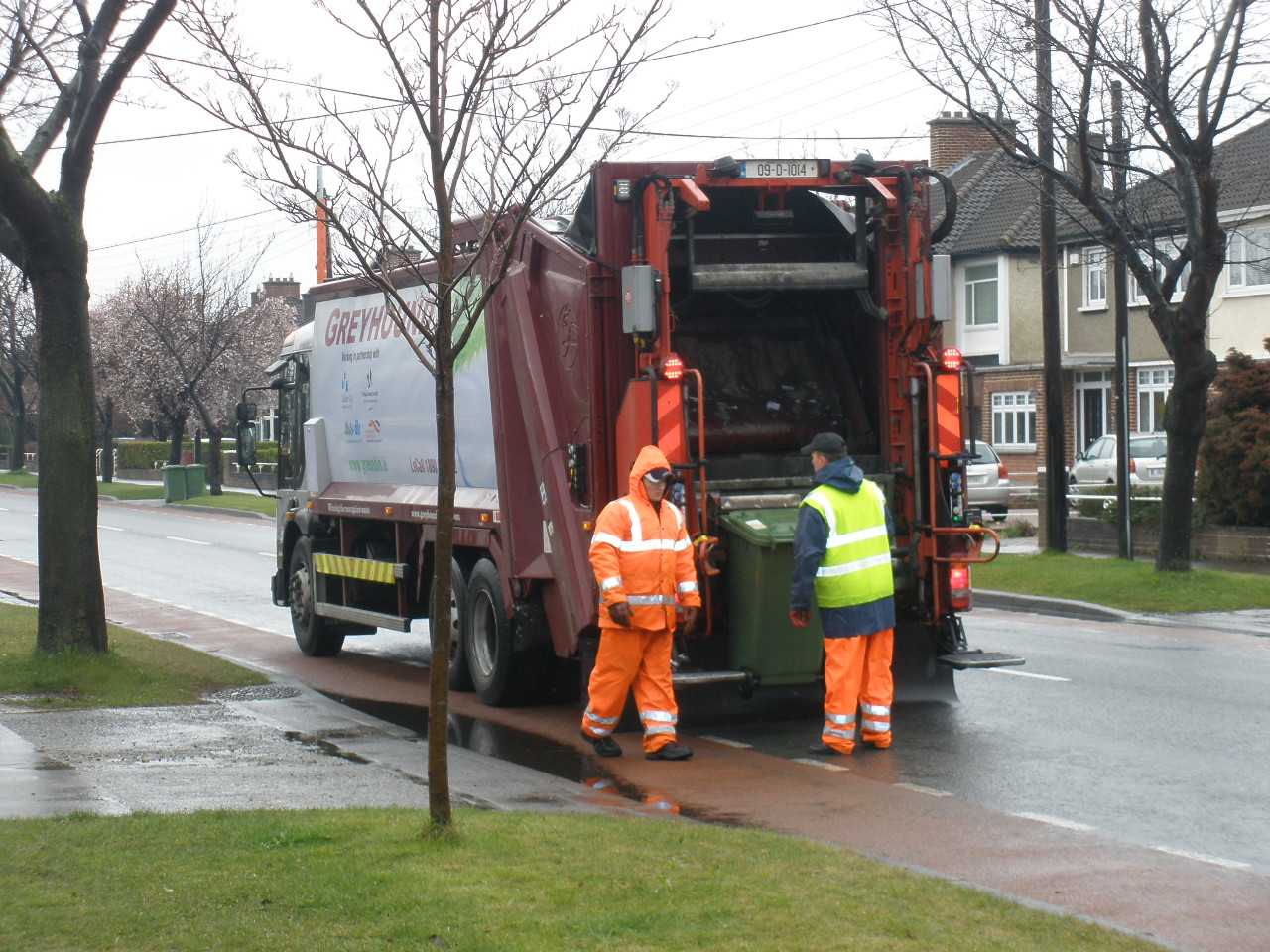
- Greyhound collecting green bins in Dublin
- Company type: Private company
- Founder: Bernard and Maura Buckley
- Headquarters: Dublin, Ireland
- Key people: Michael Buckley, Brian Buckley
- Services: Waste recycling and recovery
- Owner: Michael Buckley, Brian Buckley
- Number of employees: 500
- Subsidiaries: Grehound Household, Greyhound Commercial, EcoMondis
- Website: greyhound.ie

Greyhound Recycling is a waste collection, skip hire and recycling company in Clondalkin, Dublin, Ireland.

== History ==
The company was founded in 1974 by Bernard and Maura Buckley, It is headed by their sons Michael and Brian Buckley. The company announced 100 new jobs in 2019, bringing the total employees in the firm to 600 people.

The company took over the waste collection business from South Dublin County Council in 2011, making it one of the largest household recycling companies in Ireland. In 2012, it took over the Dublin County Council waste collection and it serves over 500,000 customers in 12 local authorities in Ireland, as well as operating renewable business interests in 15 countries in Europe and Asia.

In 2013 directors Michael and Brian Buckley were found guilty of failing to control emissions and odours coming from their main storage facility in Dublin, and sentenced to pay a fine along with legal costs and a contribution to two charities.

A 14-week industrial dispute in 2014 over pay cuts and redundancies ended with a settlement between the workers and the company, Greyhound workers' elected representatives and the SIPTU organisers involved in the dispute negotiated an agreement with management.

In August 2016 Greyhound bought the domestic waste collection businesses from its rival Panda and Greenstar in a merger process. As a provider of recycling in Ireland the company announced plans in May 2019 to invest €35 million in its commercial division over the following year.

== Awards ==
- All-Ireland Business All-Star accreditation was awarded to Greyhound Recycling in April, 2019.
- The Irish Logistics & Transport Awards in 2019 for Customer Focus Achievement.
- Community Focused Business 2019 award
