= Hound (disambiguation) =

A hound is a type of dog that assists hunters by tracking or chasing the animal being hunted.

Hound may also refer to:

- Dog, any dog of the subfamily Caninae

== Arts and entertainment ==
- Hounds (TV series), a 2012 television comedy series set around greyhound racing in Auckland, New Zealand
- Hounds (film), a 2023 Moroccan crime drama film set in Casablanca
- "The Hound", a short story by H. P. Lovecraft
- The Hound (singer) (born 1986), American singer, songwriter, and record producer

=== Fictional characters ===
- Hounds (comics), the name given to several groups of mutant characters from Marvel Comics
- Sandor Clegane, nicknamed The Hound, a fictional character in the A Song of Ice and Fire series of fantasy novels and its television adaptation Game of Thrones

== Ships ==
- Danish ship Trost, also known as Hunden ("Hound")
- HMS Hound, a name given to fifteen ships of the Royal Navy

== Other uses ==
- Hound (heraldry), used as a charge in classical heraldry
- Hound, a virtual assistant app developed by SoundHound
- De Havilland Hound, a 1920s British two-seat day bomber built by De Havilland Aircraft Company at Stag Lane Aerodrome
- Hound, Hampshire, a village in the Borough of Eastleigh, UK
