= USS Aeolus (ID-3005) =

WWI troopship

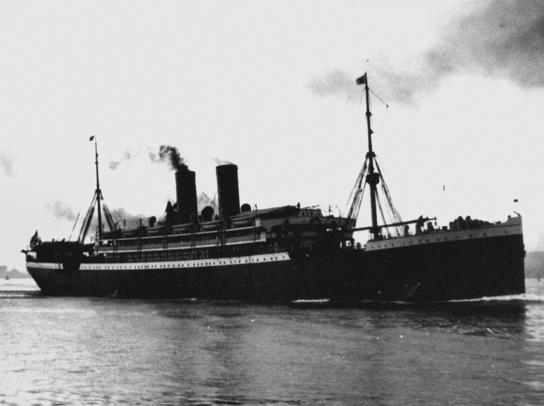
- As Grosser Kürfurst, before The Great War

History

German Empire
- Name: Grosser Kurfürst or Großer Kurfürst
- Owner: North German Lloyd
- Route: Bremen–New York City
- Builder: F. Schichau; Danzig, Germany (now Poland)
- Launched: 2 December 1899
- Maiden voyage: 1899, to Asiatic and Australian ports
- In service: 1899
- Out of service: 1914
- Fate: interned by the United States, 1914; seized, 1917

History

United States
- Name: USS Grosser Kurfurst (ID-3005)
- Acquired: 1917
- Commissioned: 4 August 1917
- Renamed: USS Aeolus (ID-3005), 1 September 1917
- Namesake: Aeolus, god of wind in Greek mythology
- Decommissioned: 22 September 1919
- Stricken: 22 September 1919
- Fate: turned over to USSB

History

United States
- Name: Aeolus
- Owner: USSB
- Operator: Munson Steamship Line
- Route: New York–South America
- Acquired: 1919
- In service: 1919
- Out of service: August 1922
- Identification: Official number: 215453; Signal letters: LHQP
- Fate: assigned to Los Angeles Steamship Co.
- Notes: 12,642 GRT US commercial registry

History

United States
- Name: City of Los Angeles
- Owner: USSB
- Operator: Los Angeles Steamship Co.
- Route: Los Angeles–Honolulu
- Acquired: August 1922
- Maiden voyage: 11 September 1922, Los Angeles to Honolulu, Hawaii
- In service: 1922
- Out of service: 1937
- Identification: Official number: 215453; Signal letters: LHQP
- Fate: Sold for scrapping in Japan, 1937

General characteristics as USS Aeolus
- Tonnage: 13,102 GRT
- Displacement: 20,000 tons
- Length: 580 ft 10.625 in (177.1 m) LOA; 562 ft (171.3 m) LBP
- Beam: 62 ft 3 in (19.0 m); 62 ft (18.9 m) at waterline
- Draft: 30 ft 0 in (9.1 m)
- Installed power: 5 double ended, 2 single ended boilers
- Propulsion: 2 quadruple expansion steam engines
- Speed: 15.5 knots (28.7 km/h; 17.8 mph)
- Complement: 513
- Armament: 4 × 5" guns; 2 × 1-pdr. guns; 2 × Colt machine guns; 1 × Lewis machine gun; 9 × depth mines

USS Aeolus (ID-3005), sometimes also spelled Æolus, was a United States Navy troopship in World War I. She was formerly the North German Lloyd liner Grosser Kurfürst, also spelled Großer Kurfürst, launched in 1899 that sailed regularly between Bremen and New York. At the outset of World War I the ship was interned by the United States and, when the US entered the war in 1917, was seized and converted to a troop transport.

Originally commissioned as USS Grosser Kurfürst, the ship was renamed Aeolus — after the god of wind in Greek mythology — while undergoing repairs and conversion at a US Navy yard. The ship carried almost 25,000 men to France during the hostilities, and returned over 27,000 healthy and wounded men after the Armistice.

After decommissioning by the US Navy, the ship was turned over to the United States Shipping Board and underwent a $3,000,000 refit in Baltimore, Maryland, and was transferred to the Munson Steamship Line for whom she carried passengers and freight to and from South American ports as Aeolus. In 1922 the ship was assigned to the Los Angeles Steamship Co. and renamed City of Los Angeles and sailed to and from Los Angeles and Honolulu. In 1937, the ship was sold for scrapping in Japan.

== Grosser Kurfürst ==
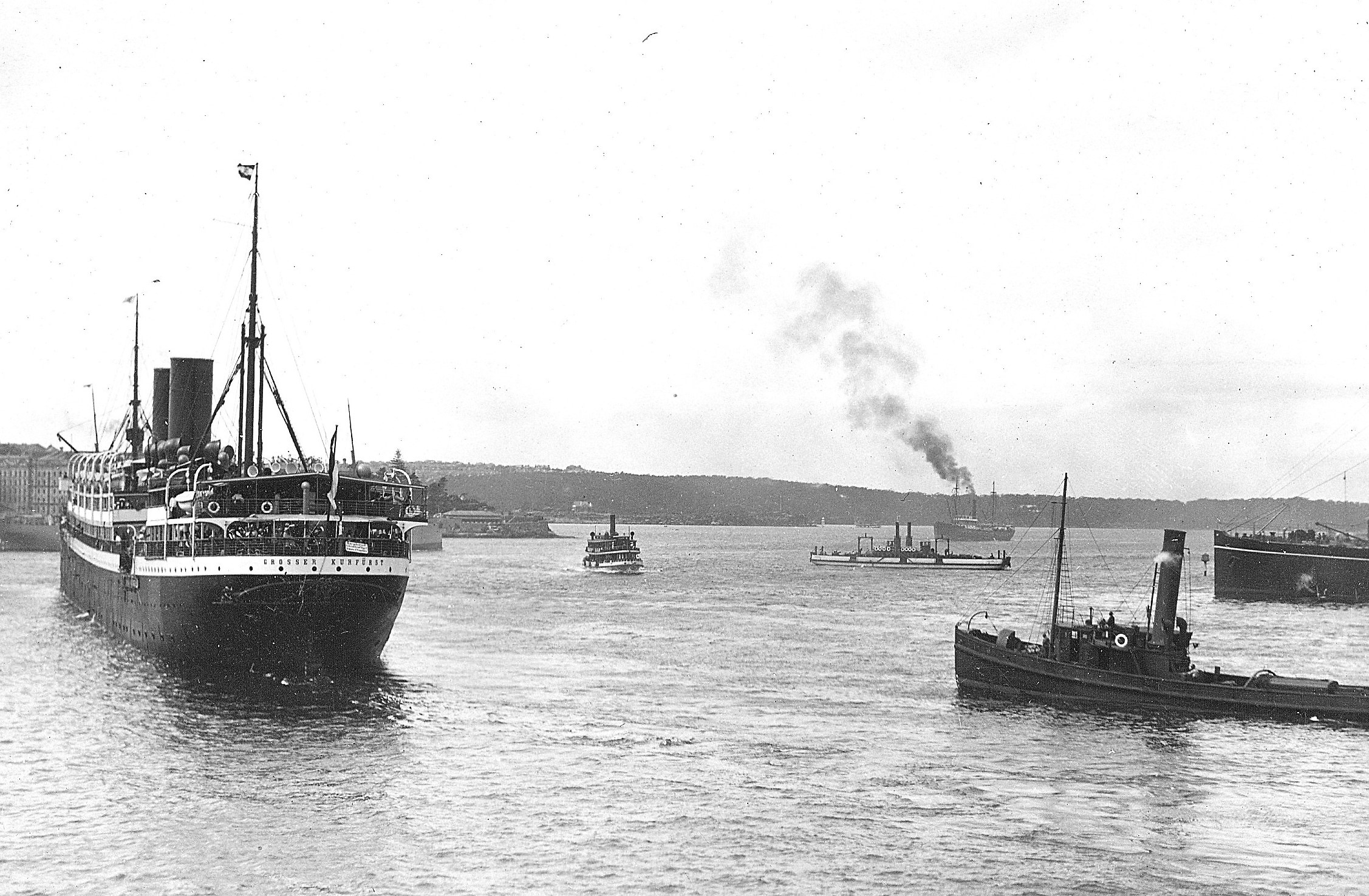
Grosser Kurfürst leaving Sydney Cove, circa 1910

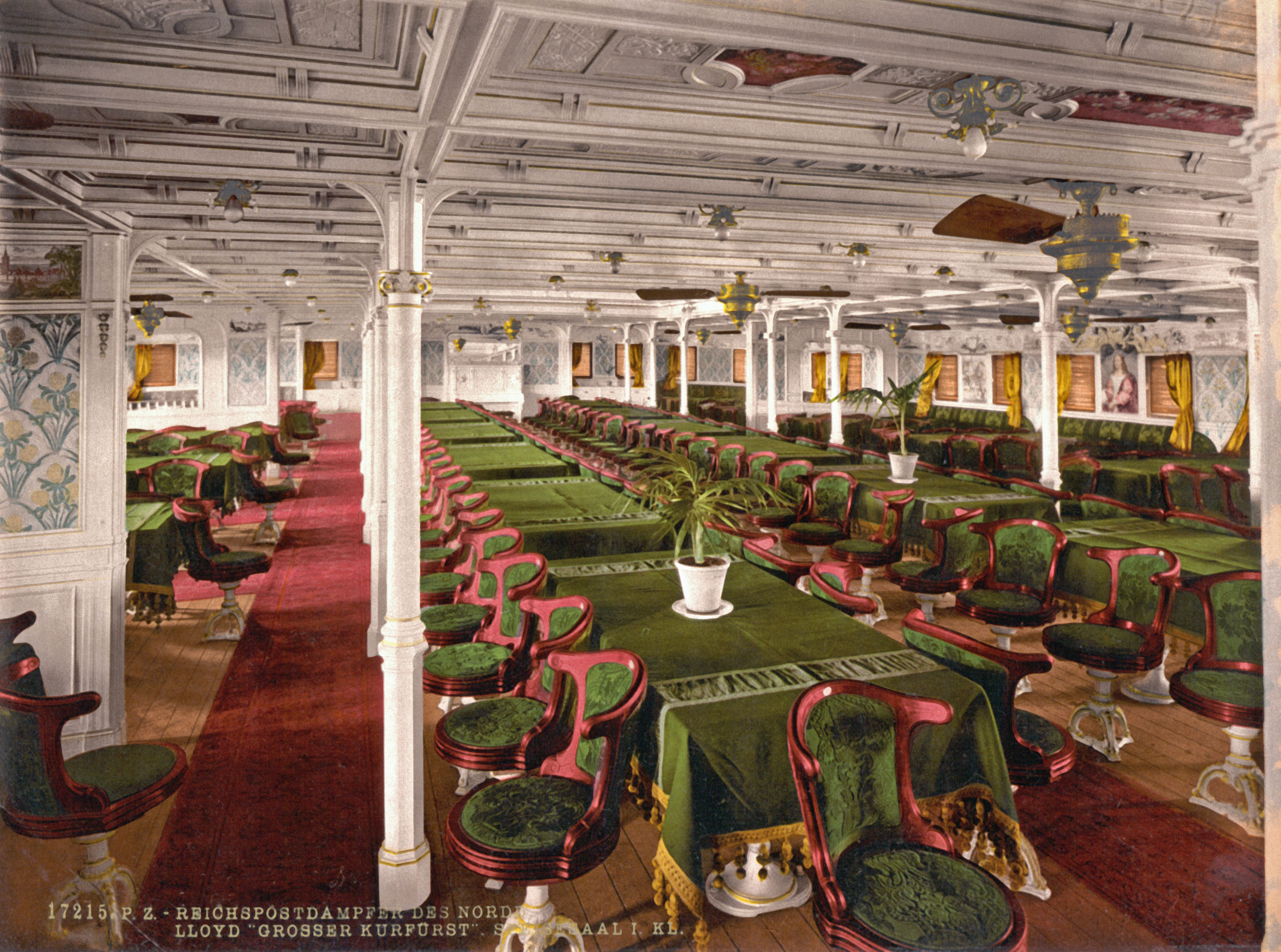
The first class dining room of Grosser Kurfürst as it appeared c. 1900

Grosser Kurfürst was a steel-hulled, twin-screw, passenger-and-cargo steamship launched on 2 December 1899 at Danzig, Germany (now Gdańsk, Poland), by the shipbuilding firm of F. Schichau for the North German Lloyd. The liner boasted "enormous carrying capacity" and "excellent passenger accommodation" for all classes from first to steerage. She made her maiden voyage to Asiatic and Australian ports before commencing regularly scheduled voyages in spring 1900 between Bremen and New York City; these lasted until summer 1914. In winter seasons she did eight more tours to Australia on the German Empire mail route. Her last start to Australia was 7 January 1912. Over these years she was the biggest ship sailing to Australia. At this time she made some cruises for US tourists.

Max Spangenberg was her captain in 1913 when she rescued passengers from the burning SS Volturno in the Atlantic.

When World War I broke out in Europe, Grosser Kurfürst was forced to seek shelter in American waters. The United States Government interned these ships wherever they had put into port, and upon the entrance of the United States into the hostilities on the side of the Allied and Associated Powers — on 6 April 1917 — took them over for "safe keeping." US Customs agents boarded Grosser Kurfürst in the port of New York, along with 30 other German and Austro-Hungarian vessels, and sent their crews to an internment camp on Ellis Island. However, before these sailors left their ships, they carried out a program of systematic destruction calculated to take the longest possible time to repair.

== USS Aeolus ==
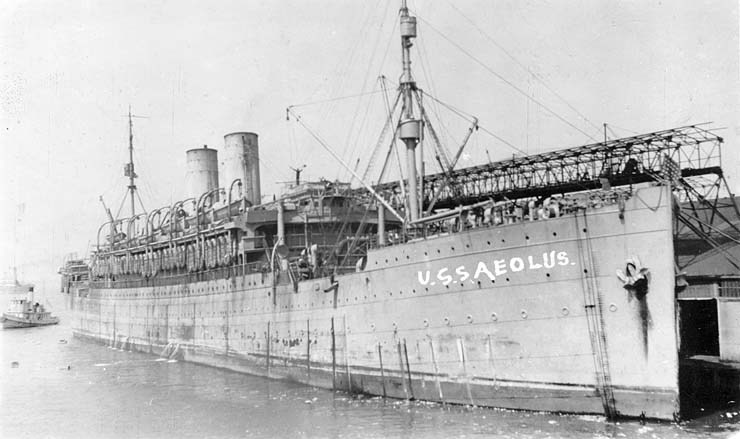
USS Aeolus in port, 1919

The United States Navy inspected Grosser Kurfürst, designated her "Id. No. 3005", and earmarked her for service with the Cruiser and Transport Force to carry troops to France. She commissioned as Grosser Kurfürst on 4 August 1917, at the New York Navy Yard. While the ship was undergoing the repairs and alterations necessitated by the German sabotage and in light of her expected role carrying troops across the Atlantic, General Order No. 320 of 1 September 1917 changed her name to Aeolus.

On 26 November 1917, the erstwhile luxury steamship, now wearing warpaint, left the Port of Embarkation at Hoboken, New Jersey, bound for Europe on the first of eight round-trip voyages in World War I, carrying troops to the Old World. She reached St. Nazaire, France, on 10 December and spent Christmas in that French port before she headed home on 28 December, bringing the voyage to a close when mooring at Newport News, Virginia, nine days into 1918. Shifting thence to Hoboken, Aeolus again sailed to France and returned from Brest again to Hoboken.

Two events highlighted the ship's wartime convoy experiences. The first occurred in the beginning of what was to be the ship's third voyage to France. Aeolus, in convoy, left Hoboken on 23 April 1918. Two days out, a steering gear casualty in the transport Siboney forced that ship to leave her assigned place in the formation. Aeolus, to avoid collision with Siboney, altered course radically, and in so doing struck the transport Huron at about 21:00 hours, 25 April. There were no deaths; but both transports were damaged which necessitated their turning back. Aeolus reached Hoboken on 28 April.

The second event occurred on 1 August 1918, while the ship was returning to the United States from Brest. At 06:05, lookouts spotted what looked to be the wake of a submarine periscope, some 6,000 yards (5,500 m) distant. Changing course, Aeolus stood to general quarters and within a minute of the sighting, her number one and three guns commenced firing. For the next few minutes, her gunners fired at the diminishing target until it pulled out of range at 06:15.

While the signing of the armistice of 11 November 1918 signalled the end of hostilities — an occasion that found the ship en route from St. Nazaire to Newport News — it only meant the beginning of the task of returning American troops from "over there." During the war, Aeolus had transported 24,770 men to the European battlefront in her eight voyages. In the postwar months, Aeolus conducted a further seven turn-around voyages, bringing back some 22,080 healthy veterans, and some 5,018 wounded and sick. Commencing her last voyage from Brest on 26 August 1919, Aeolus reached New York City on 5 September and was immediately detached from the Cruiser and Transport Force.

Decommissioned at Newport News on 22 September 1919 and turned over to the United States Shipping Board, Aeolus was presumably struck simultaneously from the Navy list.

== Post-war civilian service ==
Early in 1920, the Shipping Board let what one contemporary marine engineering journal called "one of the most extensive ship repair contracts ever awarded" in the history of the United States, to the Baltimore Dry Dock & Shipbuilding Company, of Baltimore, Maryland, to renovate the ship. Over the next few months, Aeolus underwent massive alterations at a cost of nearly $3,000,000.

Remodelled quarters, an extensive refrigeration system to preserve cargoes of frozen meats as well as the food to be consumed during the voyage, and the conversion of the ship from coal to oil fuel, all helped to make Aeolus one of the best-equipped liners afloat. Resplendent in her new livery — a battle gray hull with a white superstructure — Aeolus left Baltimore on 20 November 1920 and proceeded to New York City where, shortly thereafter, she was turned over to her operators, the Munson Steamship Line.

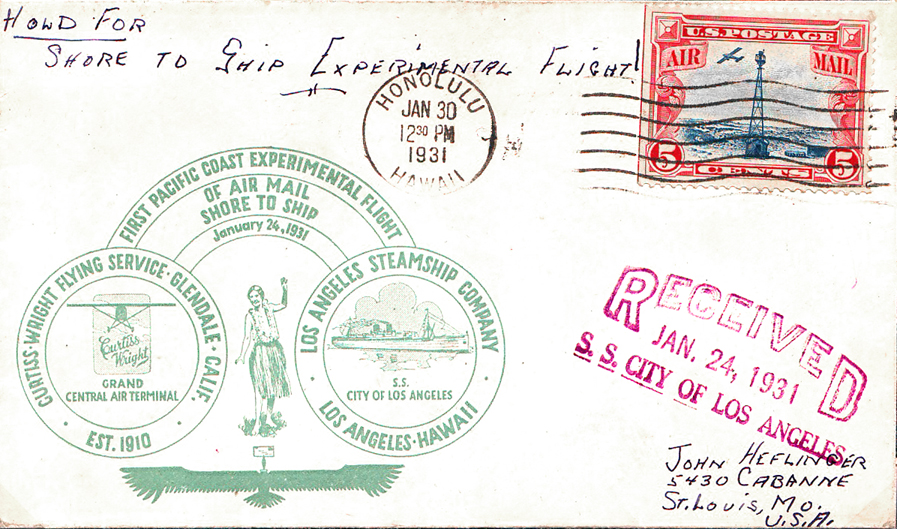
Shore-to-Ship cover flown to the SS City of Los Angeles at sea, 26 January 1931

Aeolus sailed under the Munson Line's house flag, carrying passengers and freight to and from South American ports until the summer of 1922. In August of that year, she came under the flag of the Los Angeles Steamship Company and was renamed City of Los Angeles. After being thoroughly reconditioned for her new operators, the liner sailed on 11 September 1922 for her maiden voyage under her new name, bound for Honolulu, Hawaii, in a new dazzling white paint scheme. In January 1931, the handsome liner figured in an experimental shore-to-ship air mail flight. A Ford Trimotor — flying from the Grand Central Air Terminal at Glendale, California — followed City of Los Angeles out to sea and, off the California coast, dropped a bag containing 12,527 envelopes onto the passenger liner's deck. The March 1931 issue of the Merchant Marine Bulletin speculated that this was probably the largest single consignment of airmail ever to pass through the Honolulu Post Office.

City of Los Angeles plied the Pacific between Los Angeles and Honolulu until she was sold to Japanese interests in February 1937 and cut up for scrap.
