= SS Friedrich der Grosse =

Ocean liner involved in World War I

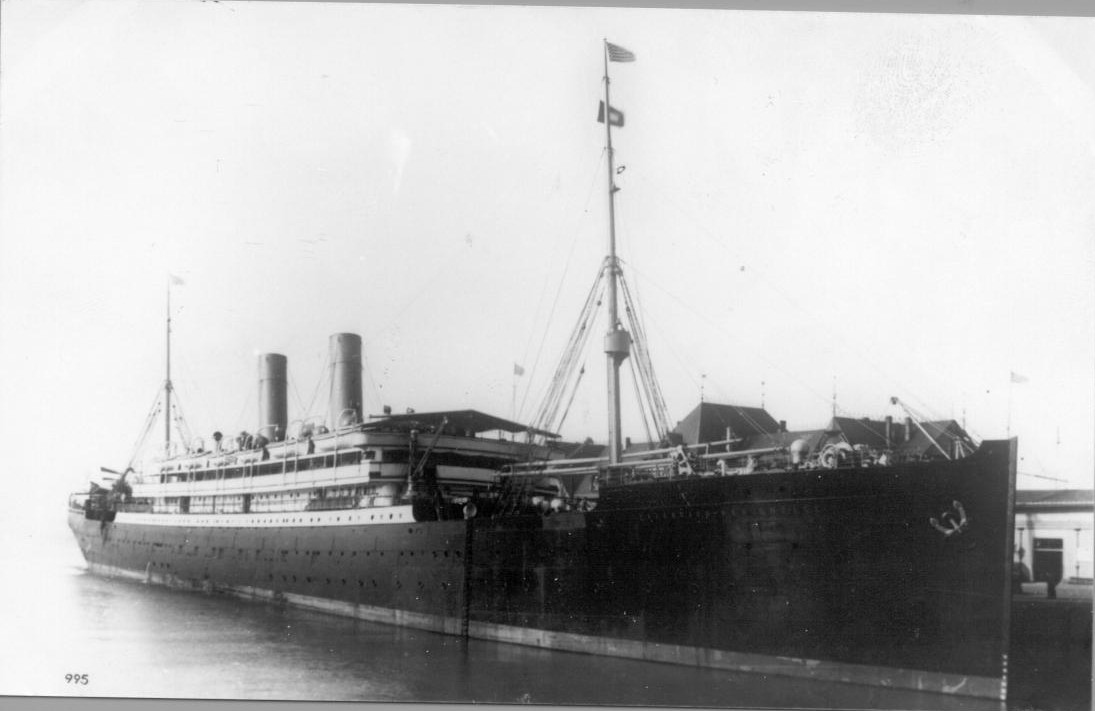
- SS Friedrich der Grosse in port.

History

German Empire
- Name: SS Friedrich der Grosse; (or Friedrich der Große)
- Namesake: Frederick the Great
- Owner: Norddeutscher Lloyd
- Builder: Vulcan Shipbuilding Corp.; Stettin, Germany
- Launched: 1 August 1896
- Fate: Interned by the United States, 1914; seized, 1917

United States
- Name: USS Fredrick Der Grosse
- Acquired: seized by U.S., 6 April 1917
- Commissioned: 25 July 1917
- Decommissioned: 2 September 1919
- Renamed: 1 September 1917, Huron
- Fate: Transferred to USSB

United States
- Name: SS Huron
- Namesake: Lake Huron
- Owner: USSB
- Operator: United States Mail Steamship Company
- Route: South American routes
- Acquired: 1919
- In service: 1919
- Out of service: May 1922
- Fate: Assigned to Los Angeles Steamship Co.

United States
- Name: SS City of Honolulu
- Owner: USSB
- Operator: Los Angeles Steamship Co.
- Route: Los Angeles–Honolulu
- Acquired: May 1922
- Maiden voyage: October 1922, sailed from Los Angeles for Honolulu
- Out of service: 12 October 1922
- Fate: Fire on maiden voyage, 12 October 1922; sunk by gunfire 17 October 1922

General characteristics
- Tonnage: 10,568 GRT
- Length: 523 ft (159 m)
- Beam: 60 ft (18 m)
- Draft: 34 ft (10 m)
- Speed: 15 kn (17 mph; 28 km/h)
- Troops: 3,400 maximum
- Complement: 446

SS Friedrich der Grosse (or Friedrich der Große) was a Norddeutscher Lloyd liner built in 1896 which sailed Atlantic routes from Germany and sometimes Italy to the United States and on the post run to Australia. At the outset of World War I the ship was interned by the U.S. and, when that country entered the conflict in 1917, was seized and converted to a troop transport, becoming USS Huron (ID-1408).

Originally commissioned as USS Fredrick Der Grosse, the ship was renamed Huron – after Lake Huron, the center lake of the Great Lakes – while undergoing repairs and conversion at a U.S. Navy yard. The ship carried almost 21,000 men to France during the hostilities, and returned over 22,000 healthy and wounded men after the Armistice.

After decommissioning by the U.S. Navy, the ship was turned over to the United States Shipping Board and was later transferred to the United States Mail Steamship Company, for whom she sailed in the Atlantic as SS Huron. In May 1922 the ship was allocated to the Los Angeles Steamship Co. and renamed SS City of Honolulu. The ship caught fire on 12 October 1922 during her maiden voyage, and sank with no loss of life.

== History ==
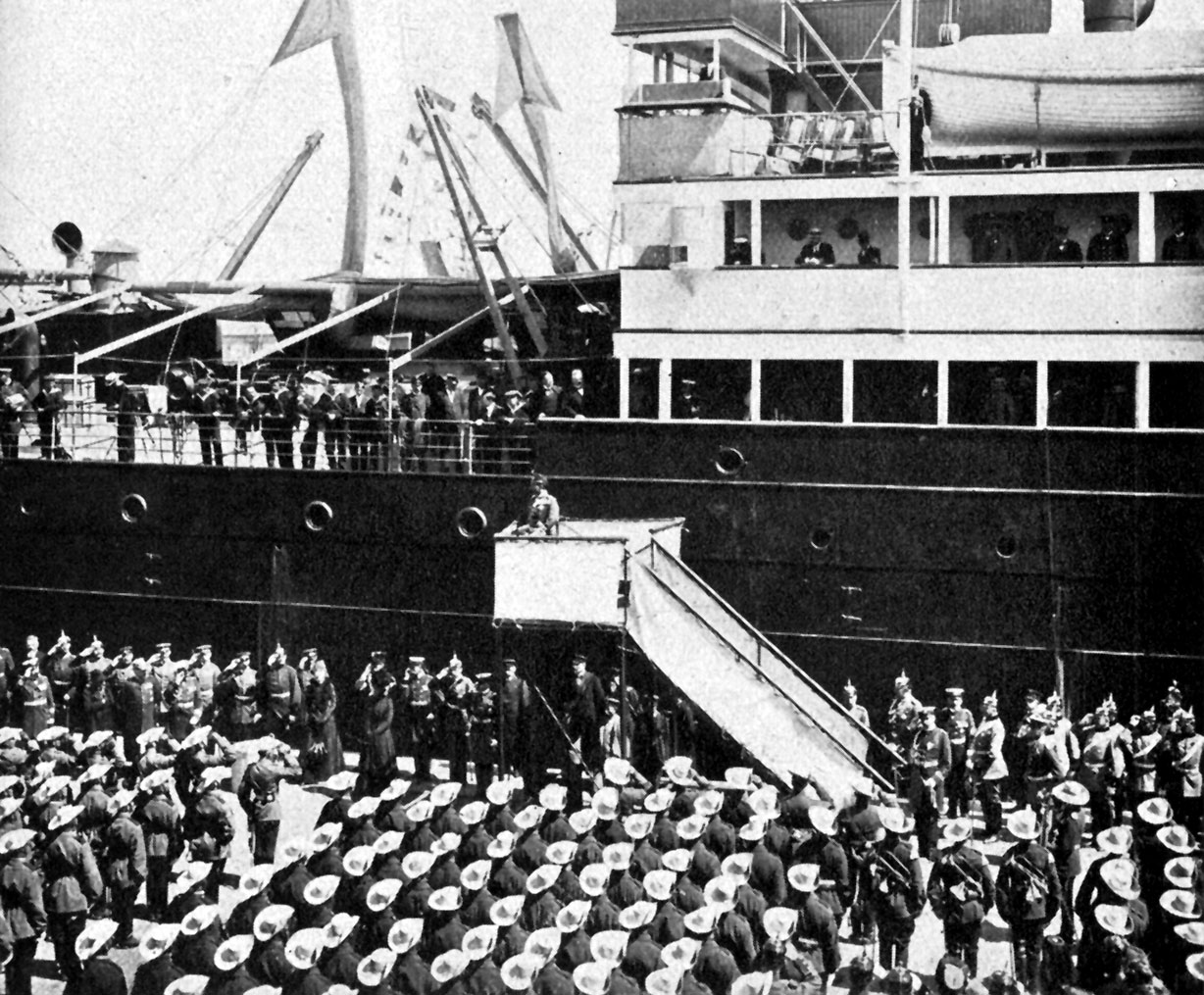
Kaiser Wilhelm II of Germany addresses troops on 27 July 1900 in front of SS Friedrich der Grosse prior to their departure for China to aid in putting down the Boxer Rebellion

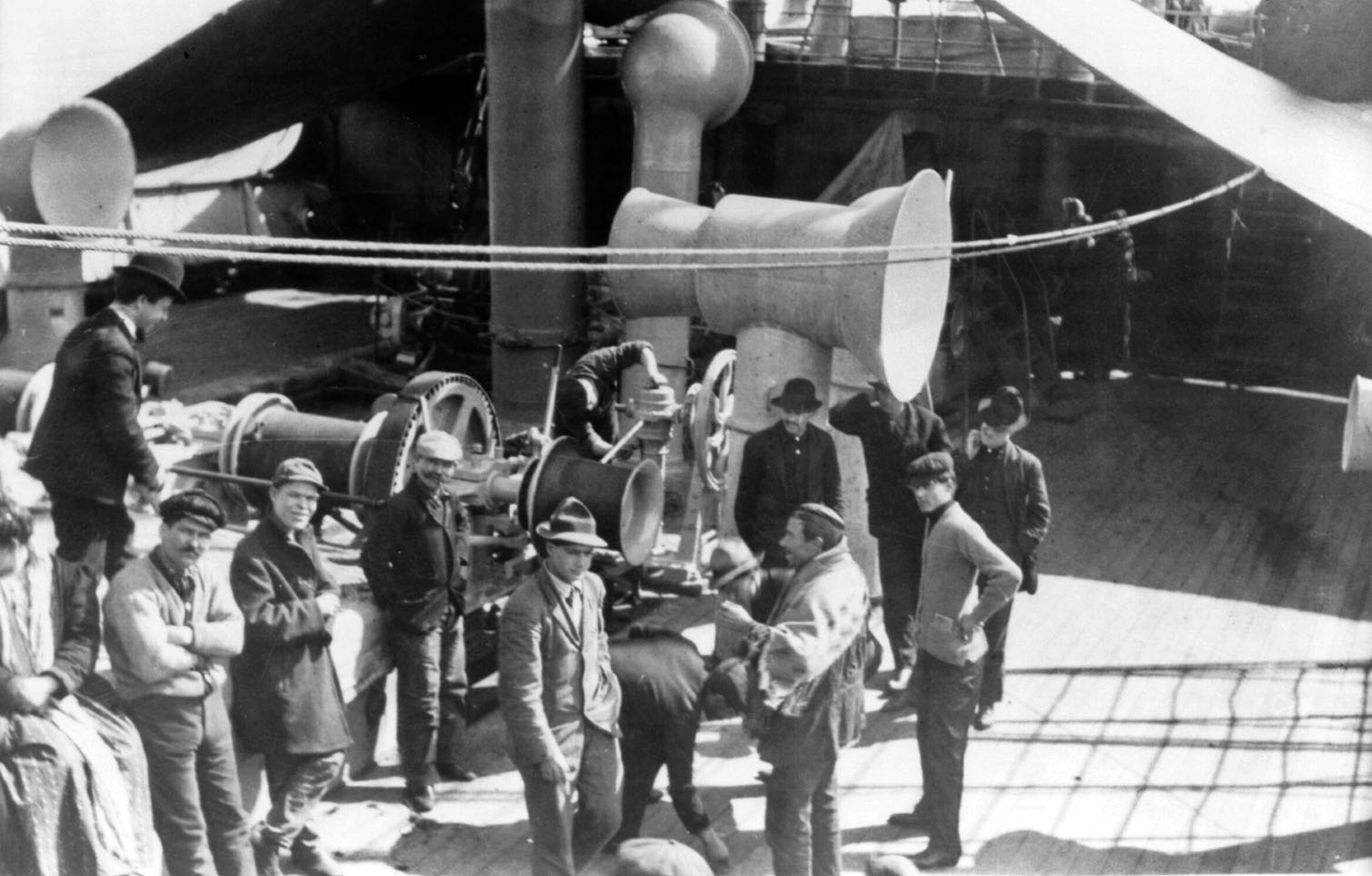
Steerage passengers aboard SS Friedrich der Grosse, probably in New York, c. 1907–1914

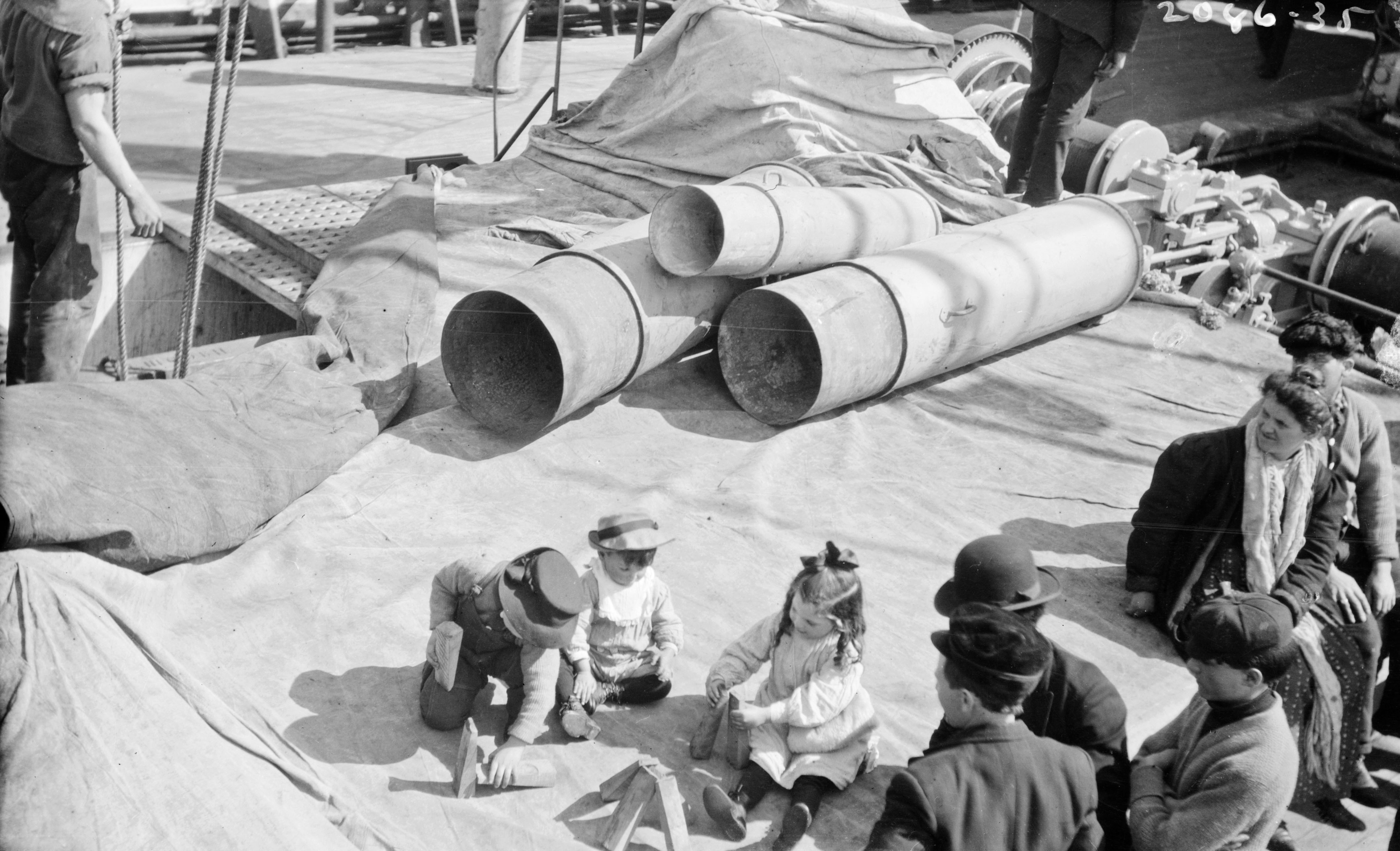
Steerage children playing aboard Friedrich der Grosse, probably taken in New York, c. 1907–1914

=== SS Friedrich der Grosse ===
SS Friedrich der Grosse (or Friedrich der Große) was built in 1896 by Vulcan Shipbuilding Corp. of Stettin, Germany as the first completed liner in the Barbarossa-class, as the largest German ship upon completion. Her maiden voyage took her to Sydney, Australia. She sailed the Atlantic for North German Lloyd until being interned in New York Harbor in 1914.

On 27 July 1900, Friedrich der Grosse provided the backdrop when Kaiser Wilhelm II held his infamous speech where he compared the military of the German Empire to the Huns.

=== U.S. Navy transport ===
Though not initially a participant in the hostilities, on the outbreak of what was then called the Great War, the United States Government interned German and Austro-Hungarian ships wherever they had put into port, and seized Friedrich der Grosse, leaving it anchored in New York harbour, but still under German ownership.

During this time, in 1915, German spy Franz von Rintelen used the interned ship as an offshore bomb-making laboratory for manufacturing the newly invented pencil bomb devices that were used to destroy cargoes on 36 ships.

Later, upon the entrance of the United States into the hostilities on the side of the Allied and Associated Powers – on 6 April 1917 – the ship was permanently seized and assigned to the United States Shipping Board (USSB). U.S. Customs agents boarded Friedrich der Grosse in the port of New York, along with 30 other German and Austro-Hungarian vessels, and sent their crews to an internment camp on Ellis Island. However, before these sailors left their ships, they carried out a program of systematic destruction calculated to take the longest possible time to repair.

Friederich der Grosse was taken to Robins Drydock Co. in Brooklyn for repairs. The USSB then turned the ship over to the U.S. Navy, and she was commissioned at New York Navy Yard on 25 July 1917 as Fredrick Der Grosse. The ship, Commander S. H. R. Doyle in command, was renamed Huron on 1 September 1917 after the center lake of the Great Lakes.

Huron acted as a troop transport during the remaining years of the war. During the beginning of one voyage to France. Huron, in convoy, departed Hoboken on 23 April 1918. Two days out, a steering gear casualty in the transport Siboney forced that ship to leave her assigned place in the formation. To avoid collision with Siboney, transport Aeolus altered course radically and in so doing struck Huron at about 21:00 on 25 April. Fortunately, there were no deaths; but both transports were damaged, which necessitated their turning back.

While the signing of the armistice of 11 November 1918 signalled the end of hostilities, it only meant the beginning of the task of returning American troops from "over there". During the war, Huron had transported 20,871 men to the European battlefront in her eight voyages. In the postwar months, Huron conducted a further seven turn-around voyages, bringing back some 20,582 healthy veterans, and some 1,546 wounded and sick. Huron reached New York City on 23 August and was decommissioned on 2 September for return to the USSB.

=== Post-war service ===
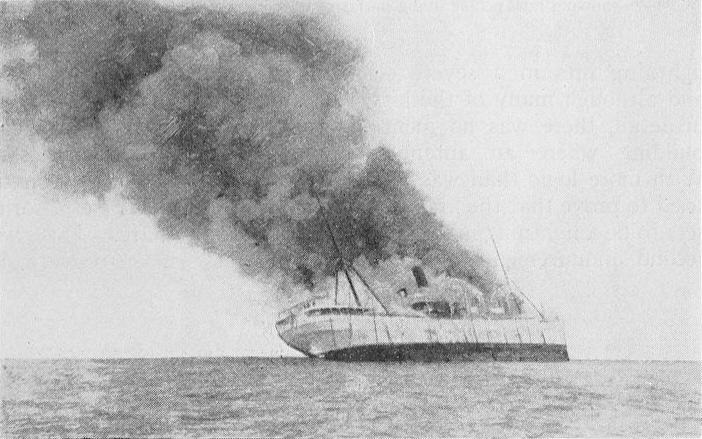
City of Honolulu burning in October 1922. All passengers and crew were saved.

Huron operated on Atlantic South American routes for the United States Mail Steamship Company from 1920 to 1922. Renamed City of Honolulu in May 1922, she was turned over to the Los Angeles Steamship Co. for passenger service from Los Angeles to Honolulu.

After departing on her maiden voyage, the ship caught fire around 05:30 on 12 October 1922 at position 31°07′N 131°40′W, some 670 mi (1,080 km) from Los Angeles. The captain ordered everyone to the lifeboats after it became apparent that the fire could not be brought under control. None of the passengers or crew were killed or seriously injured during either the firefighting attempts or the orderly evacuation of the liner. The passengers were rescued by freighter West Faralon, the first ship on the scene, but transferred to United States Army transport ship Thomas for return to Los Angeles.

United States Coast Guard Cutter Shawnee and tug Tamaroa were dispatched to either tow or sink the hulk of City of Honolulu. When towing proved to be impossible, Shawnee fired 25 rounds at the stricken ship and sank her on 17 October 1922 at position 32°30′N 129°45′W, some 185 mi (298 km) from the location of her fire.
