= USAHS Marigold =

U.S. Army hospital ship

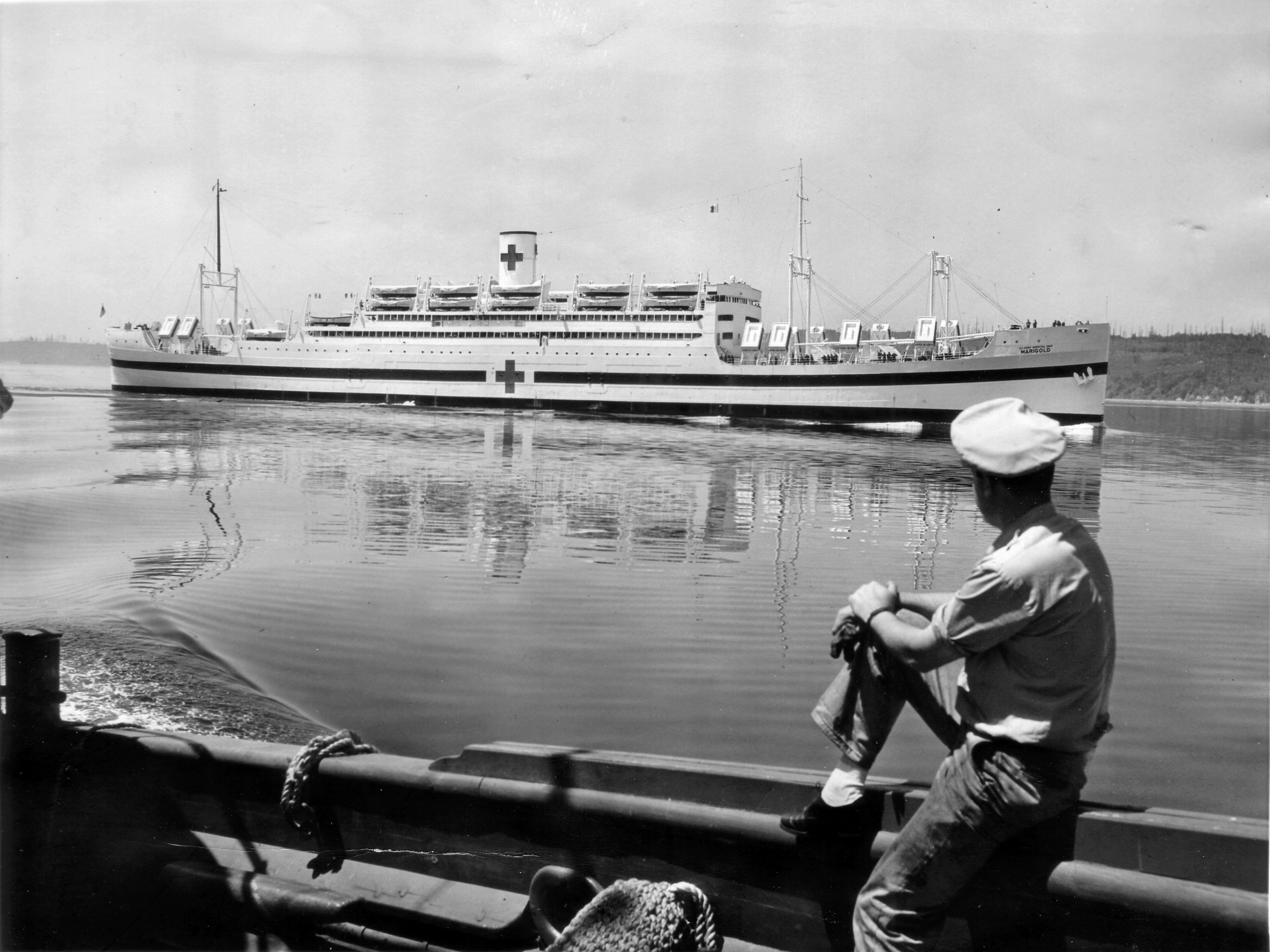
- USAHS Marigold in Tacoma, WA on 10 June 1944 following her commissioning ceremony as a US Army Hospital Ship.

History

- Name: Old North State
- Owner: US Shipping Board
- Operator: United States Mail Steamship Company
- Port of registry: US
- Route: New York – London
- Builder: New York Shipbuilding Corporation
- Cost: $4,084,695.58
- Yard number: 244
- Laid down: 20 March 1919
- Launched: 29 February 1920
- Acquired: 21 October 1920
- In service: 1920
- Fate: Transferred to US Lines 1921
- Name: Old North State (1921–1923), President Van Buren (1922–1924)
- Operator: United States Lines
- Acquired: 1921
- Fate: Sold to Dollar Line 1924
- Notes: Renamed upon conversion to all Cabin Class
- Name: President Van Buren
- Operator: Dollar Steamship Company
- Acquired: 1924
- Out of service: Laid up 1936
- Fate: Transferred to American President Lines 1938
- Name: President Fillmore
- Operator: American President Lines
- Acquired: 1938
- In service: 1940
- Out of service: October 1943
- Fate: Acquired by War Shipping Administration December 1941 operated by American President Lines as agent.
- Notes: Transferred to hospital ship service
- Name: USAHS Marigold
- Acquired: October 1943
- In service: 19 July 1944
- Out of service: 8 June 1946
- Fate: Sold for scrap, January 14, 1948

General characteristics
- Class & type: Design 1095 ship known commercially as "502" Type
- Tonnage: 10,533
- Displacement: 13,100
- Length: 502 ft 1 in (153.0 m) LBP; 522 ft 8 in (159.3 m) LOA
- Beam: 62 ft (19m)
- Draft: 31ft 9in
- Installed power: triple expansion steam
- Propulsion: twin screw
- Speed: 14 knots
- Crew: 92
- Armament: (as wartime transport) Two 3" 50 cal. Anti-aircraft guns, two .50 cal. Browning machine guns, and two .30 cal. Lewis machine guns

USAHS Marigold was a United States Army hospital ship during World War II. The ship was built as Old North State in 1920 for the United States Shipping Board as a civilian passenger/cargo liner. The ship changed ownership and operating companies several times with name changes to President Van Buren and President Fillmore before being acquired for military transport service in 1941. After government acquisition during World War II President Fillmore served as a War Shipping Administration troop transport before conversion to hospital ship service.

== Design and construction ==
Old North State was one of seven, after a contract adjustment from an original thirteen, Emergency Fleet Corporation Design 1095 passenger/cargo ships, later more frequently known in the industry as the "502" type for the design length of 502 feet (153.0 m) between perpendiculars, ordered in 1919 by the United States Shipping Board to be constructed at New York Shipbuilding Corporation, Camden, New Jersey. (Note: Some modern references, in particular the GlobalSecurity.org reference here, indicate a "confusion" between "502", the length between perpendiculars used by registers of the time, and "522" which was the length overall. That is not supported in contemporary references which use "502" Type, the "502s" or the "502-foot class" through the 1930s as can be seen in the reference with title "502 Arrives." and McKellar.) The design had been for troop transports until signing of the armistice ending World War I made completion as civilian passenger and cargo ships desirable. New York Shipbuilding had the contract for all seven of the "502" class and nine of the "535" class, an order requiring expansion and construction of the company's South Yard, that were to be delivered to the United States Shipping Board (USSB).

Originally named Old North State, in honor of the state of North Carolina, the ship was launched 29 February 1920, sponsored by Miss. Magoun, daughter of the shipbuilder's Vice-President.

The vessel accommodated 78 passengers, all first class. A contemporary report of her sea trials describes the vessel's appointments:

”No art of the interior decorator has been spared on this vessel. With its white mahogany finish, its soft-tinted artistic hangings, its open fireplaces and comfortable wicker furniture, the interior presents the aspect of a clubhouse rather than that of a ship…
“In all there are three decks given over to passenger accommodations, designated, respectively, as the promenade deck, bridge deck, and shelter deck, and the arrangement of the public rooms and staterooms provide every convenience and luxury that may be found in a first class hotel.
“All of the staterooms have beds instead of berths and many have private baths attached. The boat deck, which is exceptionally wide and which gives an unobstructed view over the whole ship, is devoted entirely to the recreation of the passengers. The promenade deck is equipped with balanced plate-glass windows giving it the appearance of a Pullman car and providing full protection for the passengers in rough or stormy weather. On this deck too are some special staterooms while at the other end of this deck is the handsomely appointed smoking room, a feature of which is a large open fireplace.”

- Philadelphia Evening Public Ledger, October 19, 1920

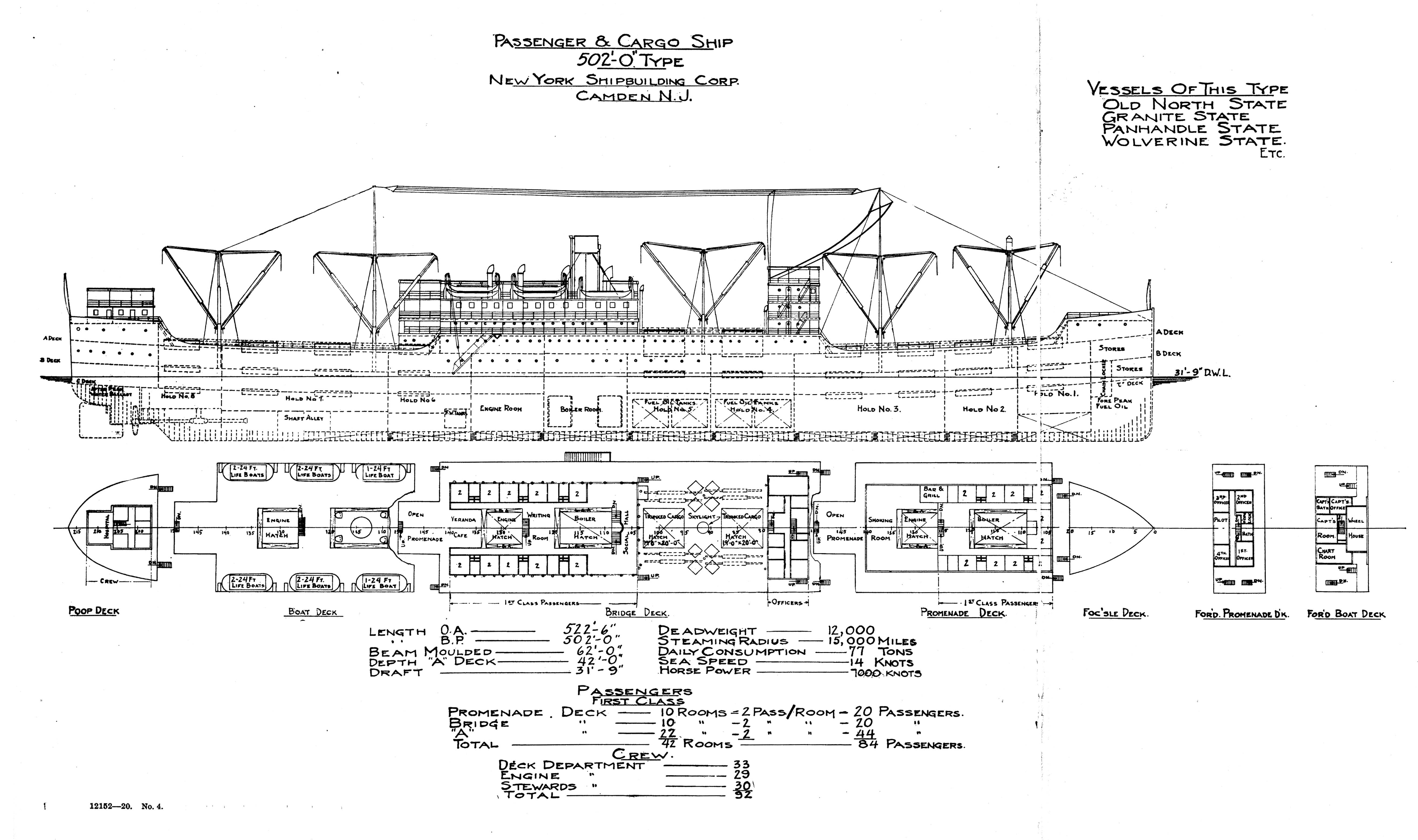
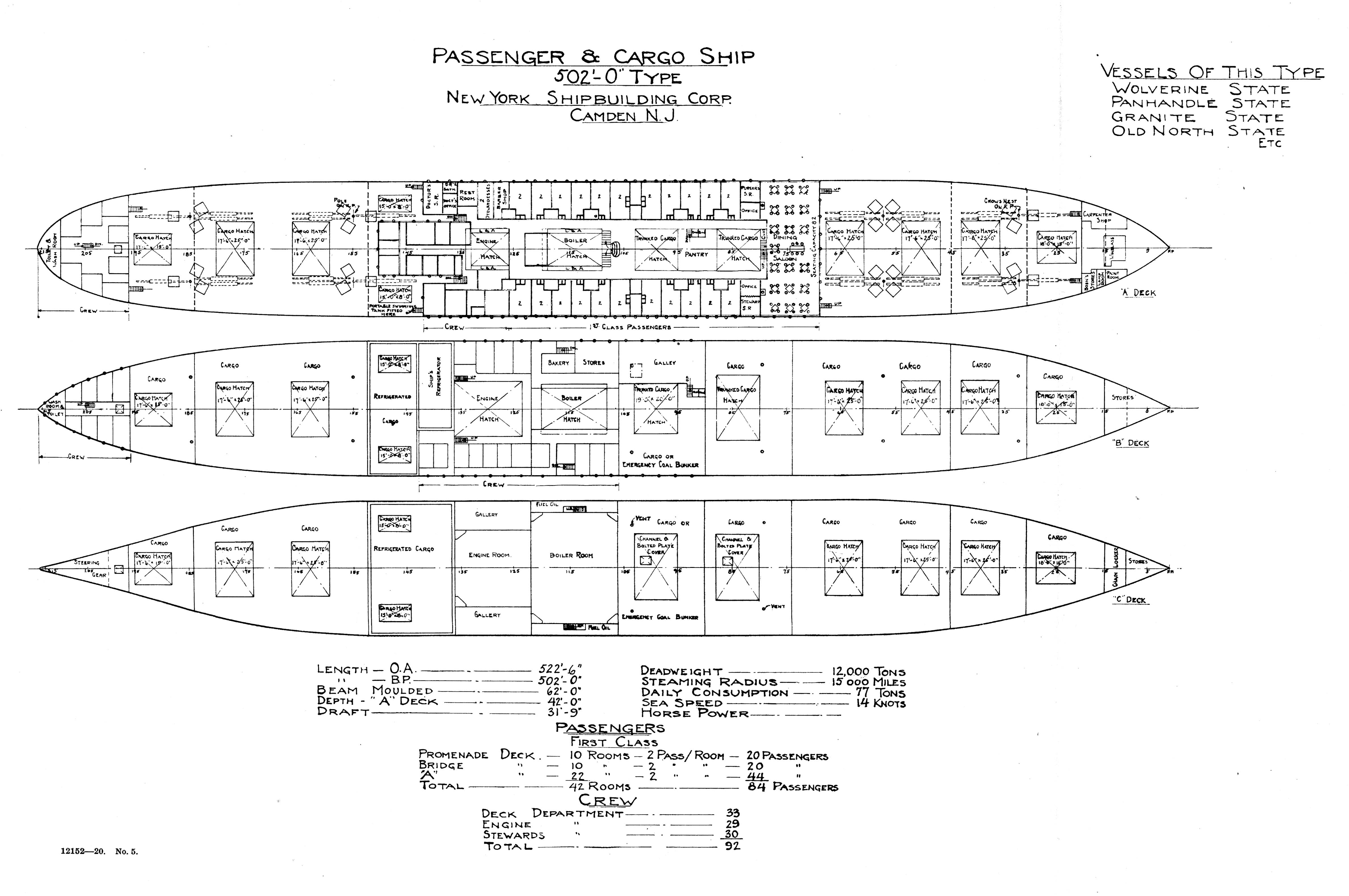
New York Shipbuilding side and deck plans for Old North State.

== United States Mail Steamship Company service ==
Old North State entered New York-London service under the operation of the United States Mail Steamship Company. Her service as an all-first class liner, was not to last one year. The shipping company suffered massive financial loss and by August 1921 the ships were returned to the US Shipping Board and a new shipping company was formed.

By 10 May 1922 all the "State" ships with names based on state nicknames were being renamed as "President" ships.

== United States Lines service ==
SS President Van Buren in a promotional card for the United States Lines.

In August 1921 the United States Lines was formed and became the new operator. In 1922 the ship was renamed President Van Buren and she now carried 103 all-cabin class passengers. Her regular route was New York – Plymouth – Cherbourg – London.

On July 4, 1923 the huge SS Leviathan took up the New York – London service. President van Buren and three other ships became excess capacity and the following year they were sold.

== Dollar Steamship Company service ==
In 1924 the Dollar Steamship Company was making a rapid expansion into the Pacific. Seven 522/502 ships, including President Van Buren were purchased and placed in Around the World Service. No renaming of the vessel was needed as all Dollar ships were named for US Presidents. The timetable for the President Liners boasted:

“…all cabins amidships, the pleasant and commodious state rooms having real twin beds (rather than berths), the abundance of accommodation with private tub and shower baths, the spacious public halls, and a cuisine attuned to these distinctive features.”

Embarking from New York the ships made calls at Havana, Colon, Balboa, Los Angeles, San Francisco, Honolulu, Kobe, Shanghai, Hong Kong, Manila, Singapore, Penang, Colombo, Suez, Port Said, Alexandria, Naples, Genoa, Marseilles, and Boston before returning to New York. By 1929 President Van Buren and 16 President Liner fleet mates operated in Around the World Service. That year however also marked the beginning of a steady decline for Dollar. The great depression was affecting cargo revenue and the company's two largest ships were running at half capacity. In 1936 President van Buren was laid up in San Francisco. In 1937 the company reached its nadir when its crown jewel, the luxurious SS President Hoover, ran aground near Taiwan and had to be declared a total loss. In August 1938 the company's operations were suspended and its control assumed by the United States Maritime Commission.

== American President Lines service ==
On 1 November 1938 the company was renamed American President Lines. In 1940 President van Buren was taken out of layup and returned to service but as a freighter. She was now ‘’President Fillmore’’, a name previously held by a 1903-built ship. While the new President Fillmore resumed civilian cargo service, the older ship was sold and renamed SS Panamanian. The name switch may have been deliberate to cloud the role of the older vessel. This role was revealed by the personal recollection of a British merchant seaman whose ship, the SS Fellside, had been sunk by torpedo:

“..I was the last of twenty survivors to be picked up by the lifeboat... We sighted a ship about 8 p.m., the ship came to us and took us on board. On the rescue ship’s side in large letters was the name Panamainian, Panama. We later found out its real name was [the old] SS President Fillmore. The Americans were not in the war at the time so they used the name Panamanian to protect their neutrality. The crew of the Panamanian told us about the cargo the ship was carrying, it had everything that was needed for a country at war. We arrived in Liverpool on Saturday, July 20, 1940…” – Thomas Reed Sanderson

== World War II service ==
When the United States entered the war in December 1941 President Fillmore was requisitioned by the War Shipping Administration (WSA) on 9 February 1942 and operated by American President Lines as the WSA agent. Though some sources use the term United States Army Transport (USAT) the ship was only allocated by WSA to Army requirements and never operated by Army or under direct contract with Army.

=== Battle of Dutch Harbor ===
On June 3–4, 1942 President Fillmore was engaged in the Battle of Dutch Harbor, the site of a US Navy and Army base. On the morning of June 3, eight hours after arriving at Dutch Harbor the crew was awakened by shore side gunfire.

“Enemy planes were sited. Visibility was excellent, inasmuch as at the hour in the Land of the Midnight Sun we were favored with a clear Arctic Sky. "Tojo" came over in formations of three and four planes, totalling nineteen bombers and fighters, and generally followed the same tactics used that he used at Pearl Harbor; i.e., squadrons approaching from the south and west simultaneously, flying straight and level, crossing, turning and coming back from the north and east..” – Gus G. Stravos, C.O., Naval Armed Guard President Fillmore went to general quarters, and her 3inch guns brought down one Japanese bomber and damaged a second.

This would not be the first time that President Fillmore would escape serious damage:

“Some of the .25 cal. bullets used by the fighter plane landed on the deck, almost cutting in half ropes and cables suspended from the booms. The ship, a survivor of five sustained attacks at Suez, is apparently "charmed," for a "dud" landed on the dock about 15 feet from the ship near the stern. The "dud" broke in half and was kicked into the water by a sailor.“- Gus G. Stravos

On the afternoon of June 4, a second attack was launched:

“Twenty-three Jap planes in formations of three, four and five appeared at 1750, coming from the south and west. They circled the mountains and attacked Dutch Harbor. The Japs used dive-bombing tactics against what seemed to be pre-determined targets. They split up as if they knew exactly where they were going, picking such targets as the oil tanks, the 3" guns, the dock and "hotel ship," the Northwestern. They bombed Dutch Harbor for about an hour.” – Gus G. Stravos

In the second attack President Fillmore shot down two fighter planes. Although strafed, she sustained no serious damage and there were no casualties aboard the ship.

President Fillmore would now serve the Pacific transporting troops and supplies from Oregon and Washington north to the Aleutians and south to Hawaii. (At that time Hawaii had a rapidly expanding Army base and a combat engineer training center.) She would later transport troops to the Philippines and to the Marshall Islands

Captain David C. Austin was awarded the Merchant Marine Distinguished Service Medal for his cool courage and leadership of his crew has they repulsed heavy enemy attacks.

By mid-1943 more new-built ships were becoming available for transport service. The Army however faced demands to evacuate patients from the Southwest Pacific and North Africa. Transports were subject to enemy attack while hospital ships plainly marked and operated under the terms of the Hague Convention were protected. The Army began to evaluate its fleet for ships for those that might be converted. Hospital ships required sufficient range and speed for transoceanic service. Patient wards should be above the waterline to allow for natural ventilation and near lifeboats for evacuation if needed. The hospital should be located slightly aft of mid-ship. Passageways needed to be wide enough for moving patients on litters. President Fillmore ticked all the required boxes.

== US Army Hospital Ship service ==
On 8 October 1943 President Fillmore was purchased by the War Department and sent to the Seattle-Tacoma Shipyard for conversion to a hospital ship. On 18 June 1944, with the name selected by the Office of the Surgeon General, the United States Army Hospital Ship (USAHS) Marigold departed Seattle for Charleston, South Carolina.

Marigold, 212th Hospital Ship Complement embarked, had accommodation for 758 patients. On July 17, 1944 she sailed from Charleston bound for Italy. Her first service area was in the Mediterranean to care for wounded soldiers from the European front. She then was transferred to the Pacific: Manila, Milne Bay, Luzon, Biak, Hollandia, and Leyte. In the summer of 1945 Marigold returned from the States to the Pacific. She was the first Allied ship to arrive in Japan and was present when the Japanese Instrument of Surrender was signed on board the battleship USS Missouri (BB-63). After the Japanese surrender, she spent three weeks caring for liberated prisoners of war. Australian, British, Canadian, Dutch, Greek, Chinese and Japanese patients were cared for alongside American troops. Later, civilians would receive care in space that had previously been devoted to the military. Decommissioned on June 8, 1946 her name reverted to President Fillmore and she was first transferred to the reserve fleet at Suisun Bay, California. But after twenty six years of invaluable peace and wartime service her work was finished. She was scrapped on January 14, 1948.

== Bibliography ==
- Charles, Roland W. (1947). Troopships of World War II (PDF). Washington: The Army Transportation Association. LCCN 47004779. Archived from the original (PDF) on April 2, 2015.
- Maritime Administration. "President Fillmore". Ship History Database Vessel Status Card. U.S. Department of Transportation, Maritime Administration. Archived from the original on November 3, 2016.
- McKellar, Norman L. "Steel Shipbuilding under the U. S. Shipping Board, 1917–1921, Part V, Contract Steel Ships". Steel Shipbuilding under the U. S. Shipping Board, 1917–1921. ShipScribe.
- Pacific Marine Review (1920). "New York Shipbuilding Corporation". Pacific Marine Review. 17 (April). San Francisco: J.S. Hines: 75–78.
- Pacific Marine Review (1921). "502 Arrives". Pacific Marine Review. 18 (February). San Francisco: J.S. Hines.
- "The New York Shipbuilding Corporation—Emergency Fleet Orders". Pacific Marine Review. 18 (April). San Francisco: J.S. Hines: 201–204. 1921.
- "Cost of U.S.S.B. Vessels". Pacific Marine Review. 19 (July). San Francisco: J.S. Hines: 434. 1922.
- Smith, Eugene W. (1947). Trans-Atlantic Passenger Ships Past and Present. LCCN 47006048.
