= Barbarossa-class ocean liner =

Ocean liner class of the German Empire

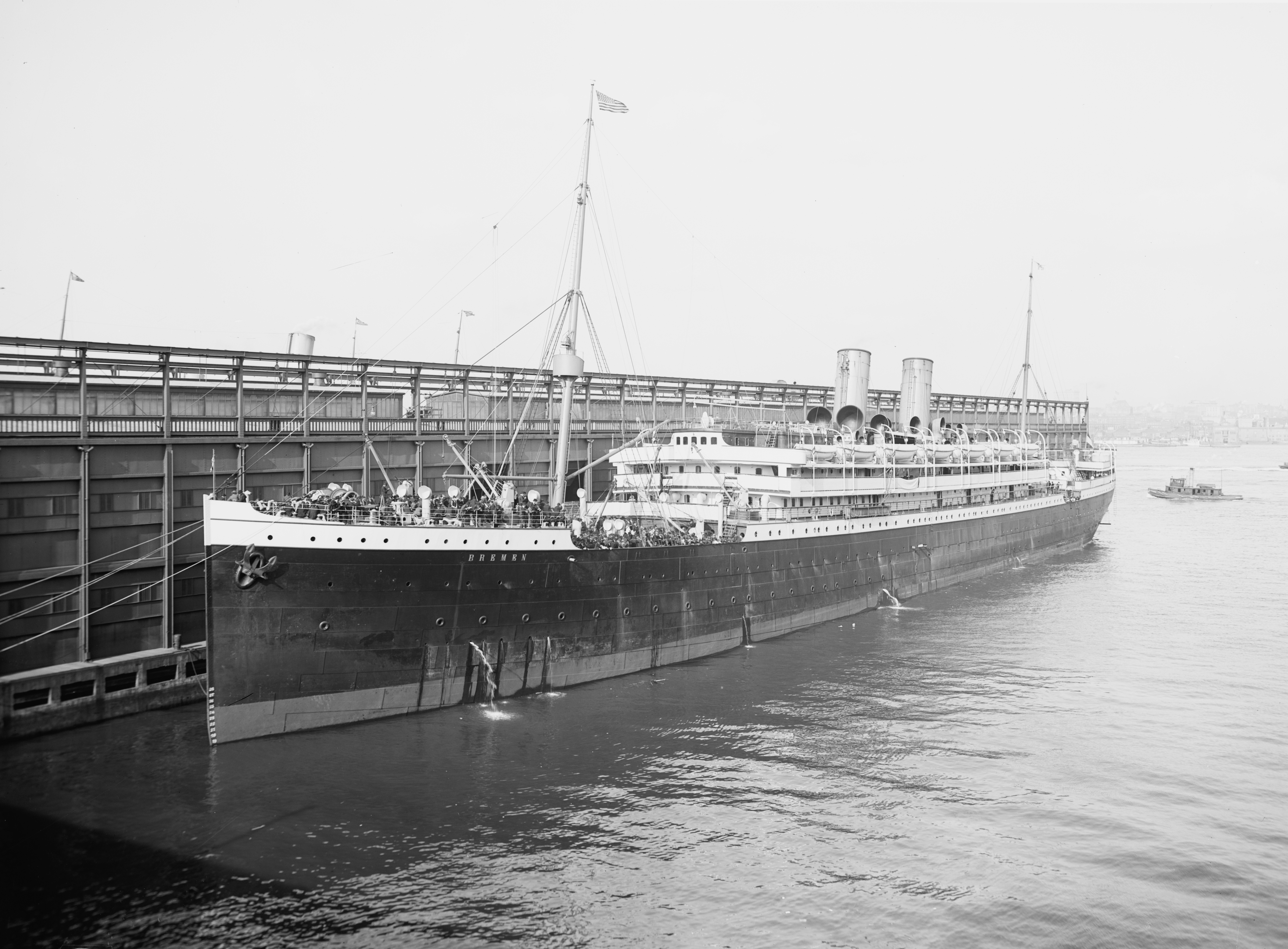
- SS Bremen in port in 1905

Class overview
- Name: Barbarossa class
- Builders: AG Vulcan, Stettin (6); Blohm & Voss, Hamburg (3); Schichau-Werke, Danzig (1)
- Operators: North German Lloyd; Hamburg America Line
- Built: 1896–1901
- In service: 1896–1935
- Completed: 10
- Lost: 1 sunk in service
- Scrapped: 9
- Preserved: None

General characteristics
- Type: Ocean liner
- Tonnage: 10,525–12,335 GRT
- Length: 152.18–160.19 m (499 ft 3 in – 525 ft 7 in), LBP
- Beam: 18.29–18.99 m (60 ft 0 in – 62 ft 4 in)
- Propulsion: two quadruple-expansion steam engines, (7,000–9,900 hp or 5,200–7,400 kW); twin screw propellers
- Speed: 15–16 kn (28–30 km/h; 17–18 mph)
- Passengers: 2,026–2,392, consisting of: 172–390 first class; 106–250 second class; 1,550–1,954 third class/steerage
- Crew: 171–250, depending on season and ship
- Notes: two funnels, two masts

The Barbarossa class was a class of ocean liners of North German Lloyd and the Hamburg America Line of the German Empire. Of the ten ships built between 1896 and 1902, six were built by AG Vulcan Stettin, three were built by Blohm & Voss, and one was built by Schichau-Werke; all were built in Germany. They averaged 11,000 gross register tons (GRT) and featured twin screw propellers driven by quadruple-expansion steam engines.

== History ==
=== Early career ===
The first four ships of the class, Friedrich der Grosse, Barbarossa, Königin Luise, and Bremen, were launched in 1896 for North German Lloyd (German: Norddeutscher Lloyd or NDL) in a combination class usable on several of NDL's routes. The class was intended to be called the Bremen class, but delays in the building of that ship caused the class to instead be named after Barbarossa. Despite the name of the class, the first ship launched was Friedrich der Grosse in August—at 10,531 GRT, the first German ship over 10,000 GRT—followed by Barbarossa, Königin Luise, and Bremen at monthly intervals. These first four ships were used on Australian, Far East, and North Atlantic routes for NDL. On Australian and Far East voyages, the liners transited the Suez Canal, and were, along with NDL's Grosser Kurfürst, (Note: Putnam (pp. 140–42) includes "Grosse Kurfürst" [sic] as a Barbarossa-class ship, but Drechsel (p. 165) calls her an "only-vessel". Grosser Kurfürst was almost 3,000 GT larger than the other Barbarossa-class ships and a full 10 meters (33 ft) longer, supporting Drechsel's view. (See Drechsel, p. 232.)) the largest ships regularly using the canal. The size of these liners was a principal reason for the canal's deepening; Bremen, on one trip to Australia, became the first ship to transit the newly deepened canal.

The latter six ships, two for NDL and four for the Hamburg America Line (German: Hamburg-Amerikanische Packetfahrt-Aktien-Gesellschaft or HAPAG) were launched between June 1899 and November 1901. NDL's two liners, König Albert and Prinzess Irene were launched a year apart in June 1899 and June 1900, respectively, and were used on Far East and North Atlantic routes. Beginning in 1904 they were mainly used on the Italy–New York route.

Of the four HAPAG liners, two, Hamburg and Kiautschou, were launched in November 1899 and September 1900 for the Far East mail routes that HAPAG and NDL shared. Displeased with the Far East service, HAPAG withdrew and transferred Hamburg to North Atlantic service and traded Kiautschou to NDL for five freighters in 1904. Kiautschou, renamed by NDL to Princess Alice, became the only Barbarossa-class ship to sail for both of the major German passenger lines. She stayed on the Far East mail route until 1914.

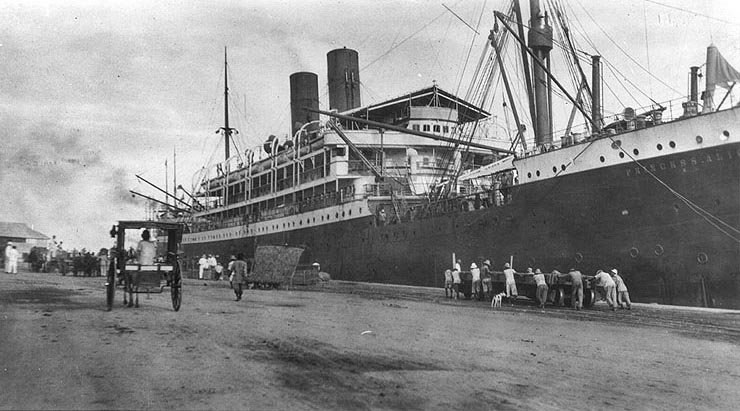
SS Princess Alice, the ex-Kiautschou, interned at Cebu, Philippines, c. 1914–1916

The last two Barbarossa ships were Moltke and Blücher, launched in August and November 1901. Moltke spent time on North Atlantic and Mediterranean routes; Blücher on North Atlantic and South American routes.

=== World War I ===
At the outbreak of World War I, rather than face capture or destruction at the hands of the British Royal Navy, most of the Barbarossa-class ships were interned in neutral ports. König Albert and Moltke were interned at Genoa, while Blücher was interned at Pernambuco, Brazil. Five ships were interned at U.S.-controlled ports: four—Barbarossa, Friedrich der Grosse, Prinzess Irene, and Hamburg—were interned at Hoboken, New Jersey, and Princess Alice was interned at Cebu, Philippine Islands. Only Königin Luise and Bremen were in German ports, where they remained throughout the war. In September 1914, Hamburg was briefly renamed and chartered to the American Red Cross. Sailing under the name Red Cross, she made one roundtrip voyage to Europe before returning to New York, and her previous name.

As Italy, the United States, and Brazil successively joined the war, each seized the interned Barbarossa ships (along with all other German and Austro-Hungarian ships) and renamed them. In Italy, Moltke became Pesaro, while König Albert became hospital ship Ferdinando Palasciano; in Brazil, Blücher became Leopoldina. The five ships interned under U.S. control all became United States Navy transport ships, and were renamed as follows:

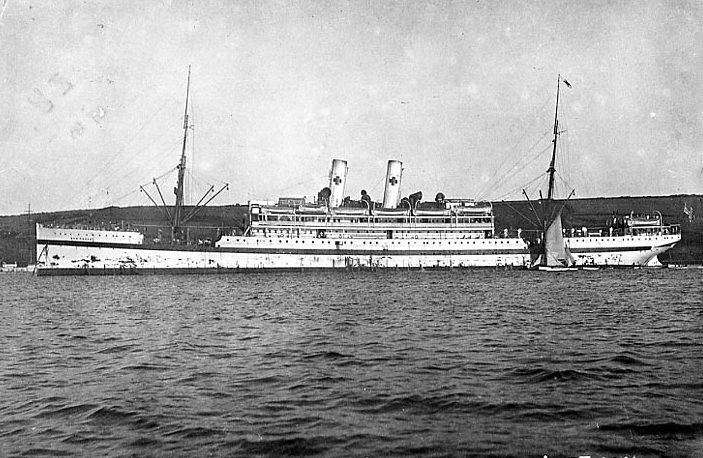
SS Red Cross, the ex-Hamburg, at Falmouth in 1914

- Barbarossa became USS Mercury (ID-3012)
- Friedrich der Grosse became USS Huron (ID-1408)
- Prinzess Irene became USS Pocahontas (ID-3044)
- Hamburg became USS Powhatan (ID-3013)
- Princess Alice became USS Princess Matoika (ID-2290)

These five ex-German transports carried over 95,000 American troops to France before the Armistice.

=== Postwar service ===
At the conclusion of World War I, war reparations permanently assigned the eight seized ships to the nations that held them. Further, Königin Luise and Bremen, safely laid up in Germany during the war, were assigned to the UK. Apart from those two, only two other Barbarossa-class ships changed national registry after the war. Brazil sold Leopoldina (the ex-Blücher) to the French Compagnie Générale Transatlantique which operated her under the name Suffren. Pocahontas (the ex-Prinzess Irene) was laid up in Gibraltar after mechanical failures and was purchased by NDL in 1923. She became the only member of the Barbarossa class to resume sailing under the German flag. First renamed Bremen and later Karlsruhe (to free the name Bremen for a newer ship), she sailed primarily on the Bremen–New York route.

In 1922, City of Honolulu (the ex-Friedrich der Grosse), sailing on her first roundtrip on the Los Angeles–Honolulu route for the Los Angeles Steamship Company, caught fire and burned in a calm sea. No one on board was killed or injured when the lifeboats were launched, and when towing the burned hulk proved unsuccessful, the ship was sunk by gunfire from a United States Coast Guard Cutter; she was the only member of the Barbarossa class to sink. By the end of the 1920s, six more Barbarossa ships had met their ends at the hands of shipbreakers, and none of the remaining three ships would survive the next decade. All were scrapped by 1935, bringing an end to the career of the Barbarossa class.

== Ships ==
Ship	Tonnage	Builder	Original Operator	Launch	Fate	Later names
Friedrich der Grosse	10,531 GT	AG Vulcan	NDL	1 August 1896	Sunk after fire, 1922	Huron, 1917; City of Honolulu, 1922
Barbarossa	10,769 GT	Blohm & Voss	NDL	5 September 1896	Scrapped, 1924	Mercury, 1917
Königin Luise	10,566 GT	AG Vulcan	NDL	17 October 1896	Scrapped, 1935	Omar, 1921; Edison, 1924
Bremen	10,525 GT	Schichau-Werke	NDL	14 November 1896	Scrapped, 1929	Constantinople, 1921; King Alexander, 1924
König Albert	10,643 GT	AG Vulcan	NDL	24 June 1899	Scrapped, 1926	Ferdinando Palaciano, 1915; Italia, 1922
Hamburg	10,532 GT	AG Vulcan	HAPAG	25 November 1899	Scrapped, 1928	Powhatan, 1917; New Rochelle, 1920; Hudson, 1921; President Fillmore, 1922
Prinzess Irene	10,881 GT	AG Vulcan	NDL	19 June 1900	Scrapped, 1932	Pocahontas, 1917; Bremen, 1923; Karlsruhe, 1928
Kiautschou	10,911 GT	AG Vulcan	HAPAG	14 September 1900	Scrapped, 1934	Princess Alice, 1904; Princess Matoika, 1918; President Arthur, 1923; City of Honolulu, 1926
Moltke	12,335 GT	Blohm & Voss	HAPAG	27 August 1901	Scrapped, 1925	Pesaro, 1919
Blücher	12,334 GT	Blohm & Voss	HAPAG	23 November 1901	Scrapped, 1929	Leopoldina, 1917; Suffren, 1923

== Bibliography ==
- Bonsor, N. R. P. (1975) [1955]. North Atlantic Seaway, Volume 1 (Enlarged and revised ed.). New York: Arco Publishing Company. ISBN 0-668-03679-6. OCLC 1891992.
- Bonsor, N. R. P. (1978) [1955]. North Atlantic Seaway, Volume 2 (Enlarged and completely revised ed.). Saint Brélade, Jersey: Brookside Publications. ISBN 0-905824-01-6. OCLC 29930159.
- Drechsel, Edwin (1994). Norddeutscher Lloyd, Bremen, 1857–1970: History, Fleet, Ship Mails, Volume 1. Vancouver, British Columbia: Cordillera Pub. Co. ISBN 978-1-895590-08-1. OCLC 30357825.
- Gleaves, Albert (1921). A History of the Transport Service: Adventures and Experiences of United States Transports and Cruisers in the World War. New York: George H. Doran Company. OCLC 976757.
- Putnam, William Lowell (2001). The Kaiser's Merchant Ships in World War I. Jefferson, North Carolina: McFarland. ISBN 978-0-7864-0923-5. OCLC 46732396.
- Matthias L. Trennheuser: Die innenarchitektonische Ausstattung deutscher Passagierschiffe zwischen 1880 und 1940. Verlag H.M. Hauschild GmbH, Bremen, Bremen 2010, ISBN 978-3-89757-305-5.
