= USS Pocahontas (ID-3044) =

US Navy transport ship (1899–1932)

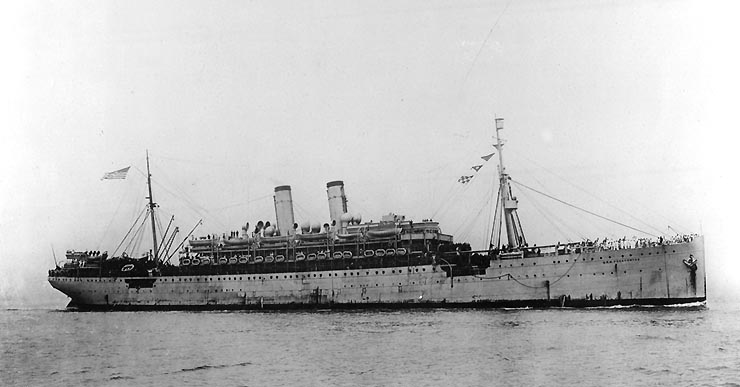
- USS Pocahontas underway in 1919

History

German Empire
- Name: Prinzess Irene
- Namesake: Princess Irene of Hesse
- Owner: Norddeutscher Lloyd
- Port of registry: Bremen
- Route: Bremen – New York
- Builder: AG Vulkan, Stettin
- Yard number: 245
- Launched: 19 June 1900
- Completed: 6 September 1900
- Identification: code letters QHCJ; by 1913: call sign DKE
- Fate: Seized by the United States, 1917

United States
- Name: USS Pocahontas
- Namesake: Pocahontas
- Acquired: Seized, 1917
- Commissioned: 25 July 1917
- Decommissioned: 7 November 1919
- Fate: Returned to USSB, 1919. Sold for scrap, 1932

General characteristics
- Class & type: Barbarossa-class ocean liner
- Tonnage: 10,893 GRT, 6,443 NRT
- Displacement: 18,000 long tons (18,289 t)
- Length: 564 ft (172 m) overall; 523.5 ft (159.6 m) registered
- Beam: 60.2 ft (18.3 m)
- Draft: 28 ft 6 in (8.69 m)
- Depth: 34.7 ft (10.6 m)
- Decks: 4
- Installed power: 2 × quadruple-expansion engines; 1,016 NHP
- Propulsion: 2 × screws
- Speed: 16 knots (30 km/h; 18 mph)
- Complement: 610 officers and enlisted
- Sensors & processing systems: submarine signalling
- Armament: 4 × 6 in (150 mm) guns; 2 × 3 in (76 mm) guns; 3 × 1-pounder guns; 1 × machine gun

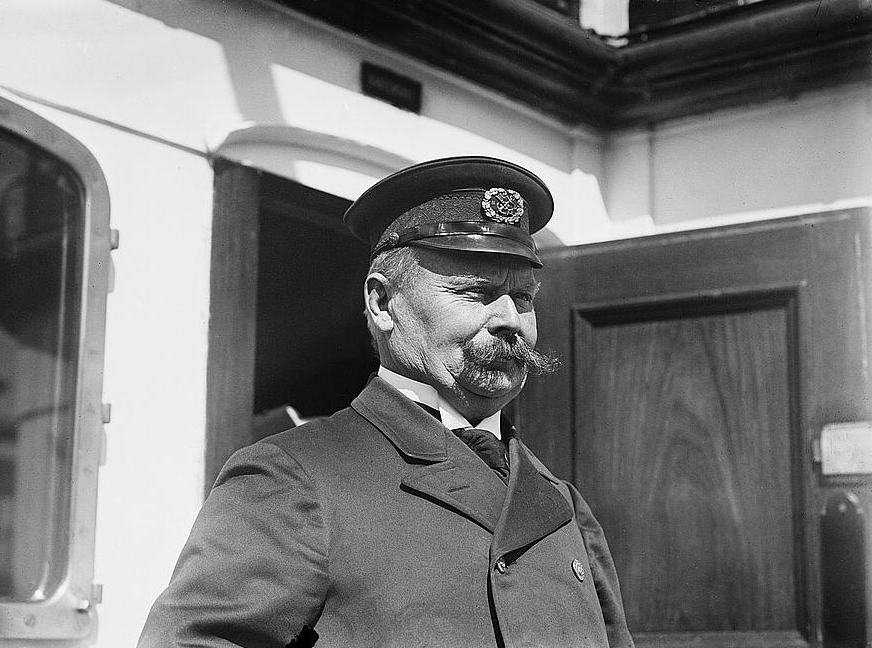
Captain Frederic von Letten-Peterssen in 1911

USS Pocahontas (SP-3044) was a transport ship for the United States Navy in World War I. She was originally the Reichspostdampfer Prinzess Irene, a Barbarossa-class ocean liner built in 1900 by AG Vulcan of Stettin, Germany, for Norddeutscher Lloyd.

At the beginning of World War I, the ship was in New York. Later, she was interned by the United States. She was seized when that country entered the conflict in 1917 and converted to a troop transport. As USS Pocahontas, she carried 24,573 servicemen to Europe, and after the war returned 23,296 servicemen to the United States.

Decommissioned by the U.S. Navy, the United States Shipping Board sold her back to the North German Lloyd line, where she saw mercantile service until being scrapped in 1932.

== Prinzess Irene ==
She was launched as Prinzess Irene on 19 June 1900 by Aktiengesellschaft Vulkan, Stettin, Germany for North German Lloyd Lines. On 9 September 1900, she started her maiden voyage to New York City. On 30 October 1900, she began the first of seven trips on the German Empire mail run to the Far East to Yokohama, the route she was built for.

On 30 April 1903, she went on the Genoa – Naples – New York run and stayed mainly on this service together with her sister ship König Albert and sometimes other ships of the Barbarossa class. In 1911, under Captain Frederic von Letten-Peterssen, she was stranded for eighty-three hours on the Fire Island sandbars.

Her last voyage was to New York on 9 July 1914. With the outbreak of World War I in August, she was stranded in New York since the British Royal Navy controlled the North Atlantic. She remained there until seized by the United States by Executive Order 2651 on 30 June 1917, under the authority prescribed in the Enemy Vessel Confiscation Joint Resolution passed on 12 May 1917.

== USS Pocahontas ==
After refitting and training with the Atlantic Fleet, she was commissioned as Princess Irene on 25 July 1917. Assigned to the Cruiser-Transport Force under Rear Admiral Albert Gleaves, the ship was renamed Pocahontas on 1 September 1917.

Through the rest of the war and for nearly a year after the Armistice, Pocahontas served as a troop transport, completing eighteen round trips to Europe. She carried 24,573 servicemen to Brest and St. Nazaire and returned 23,296 servicemen to the United States.

Although Pocahontas conveyed all of her passengers safely, she faced numerous dangers. The most serious incident occurred in the forenoon of 2 May 1918 when an Imperial German Navy submarine surfaced in her path and straddled her with 5.9 in (150 mm) shells. Captain Edward C. Kalbfus ordered the crew to battle stations and gave the signal to open fire. However, the U-boat was not in range of her guns. Fragments of enemy shells landed on the ship, but she was not directly hit and suffered no casualties. Captain Kalbus commenced zig-zag courses, and then at full speed drew away from the submarine, probably SM U-151, about twenty minutes after the attack began. Making a record of 16.2 knots (30.0 km/h; 18.6 mph), he kept the enemy out of range until he lost her. For his successful defense of his ship, Captain Kalfbus was awarded the Navy Cross.

Pocahontas decommissioned at the Brooklyn Navy Yard on 7 November 1919 and was handed over to the United States Shipping Board for sale.

== SS Pocahontas ==
In 1920, SS Pocahontas was chartered to the United States Mail Steamship Company of New York and began commercial services between the United States and Italy in 1921.

Pocahontas was the subject of widespread media coverage between May and July 1921 due to mechanical problems, sabotage and mutiny. The vessel left New York on 23 May 1921 en route to Naples. On 25 May, she was anchored off Nobska Point in Vineyard Sound in need of repair. A gang of boilermakers and mechanics boarded the ship to make repairs en route to Boston. Further repairs were undertaken in the Azores in June. The vessel did not arrive in Naples until 4 July, spending 43 days at sea. It was later reported that the vessel had been subject to sabotage and that some of the crew "began to threaten the commander and to damage the machinery and the electric light apparatus and even attempt ... to sink the steamer" Just before entering Naples, the assistant engineer drowned when he jumped overboard. On arrival in Naples, the ship's captain submitted a full report to the American consul, who conducted an investigation. The crew, in turn, filed charges of cruelty against the captain with the Italian authorities. While the crew were returned to the United States, the ship was repaired in Naples. A "great deal" of cotton waste was found in the steamer's pumps, but otherwise it suffered only minor damage. Although she was due to sail for New York on 31 July, the ship was ordered to stay in port pending payment of debts incurred in relation to the repair work. The total repair bill amounted to 2,700,000 lire. Despite intervention from the American consul, the ship did not sail until 8 September. Due to frequent bunker fires, however, the ship was considered to be in worse condition "than when it was in drydock". The vessel was again laid up on 22 September, this time in Gibraltar, having suffered further damage to her machinery. Passengers were transferred to other vessels. The ship then remained inactive until she was sold in 1922.

The then future Prime Minister of Israel, Golda Meir, was on board Pocahontas in May 1921, while emigrating from the United States to Palestine. She recounts the events of the journey in her autobiography, My Life.

== SS Bremen ==
In April 1922, the United States Shipping Board received an offer of £17,000 for the purchase of Pocahontas, which was then laid up in Malta. When the United States Mail Steamship Company went into liquidation in 1922, the ship was sold back to its original owners, North German Lloyd and renamed Bremen.

After repair and refit, SS Bremen made her first voyage from Bremen to New York in April 1923.

The Laristan, a cargo ship, foundered in the Atlantic in January 1926 at 45°12′N 43°12′W with the loss of 24 of her 30 crew; survivors were rescued by Bremen.

== SS Karlsruhe ==
She was renamed Karlsruhe in 1928 and continued to serve until 1932, before being scrapped in Germany.
