= United States Mail Steamship Company =

Defunct American steamship line

The United States Mail Steamship Company – also called the United States Mail Line, or the U.S. Mail Line – was a passenger steamship line formed in 1920 by the United States Shipping Board (USSB) to run the USSB's fleet of former German ocean liners that the United States had seized during World War I or been awarded as war reparations after the end of the war. Receivers were appointed for the line after financial improprieties and massive losses came to light. After review of the financial data, a United States District Court ordered that all the US Mail Line ships be returned to the USSB.

== History ==
The New York State Senate first proposed the creation of the United States Mail Steamship Company in March 1848. A bill entitled, "The Act to Incorporate the United States Mail Steamship Company," was introduced to the Senate, and referred to the Committee on Commerce and Navigation. The bill provided the capital stock of the company was to be $1,500,000 to be divided into shares of $100 each. George Law, Marshall O. Roberts, and B. R. McIlvaine, and associates were named as the corporate body. The gentlemen were appointed commissioners to receive subscriptions for the capital stock, and the stockholders would be, "jointly and severally, individually liable for the debts that may be due and owing to their operatives, and to all their creditors, to an amount equal to the stock held by them." It was planned that the steamships would run between New York and southern ports, and would "..be built for the general government, and under the supervision of a naval officer; they are also to be built so that in war they may be speedily converted into war steamships."

== Passenger ships ==
- America
- Antigone (renamed Potomac)
- Centennial State
- George Washington
- Hudson (renamed New Rochelle)
- Old North State
- Panhandle State
- Pocahontas
- Princess Matoika
- Susquehanna
- Talamanca
- Segovia (burned in the shipbuilding yard)
