= SS Moltke =

Ocean liner launched 1901

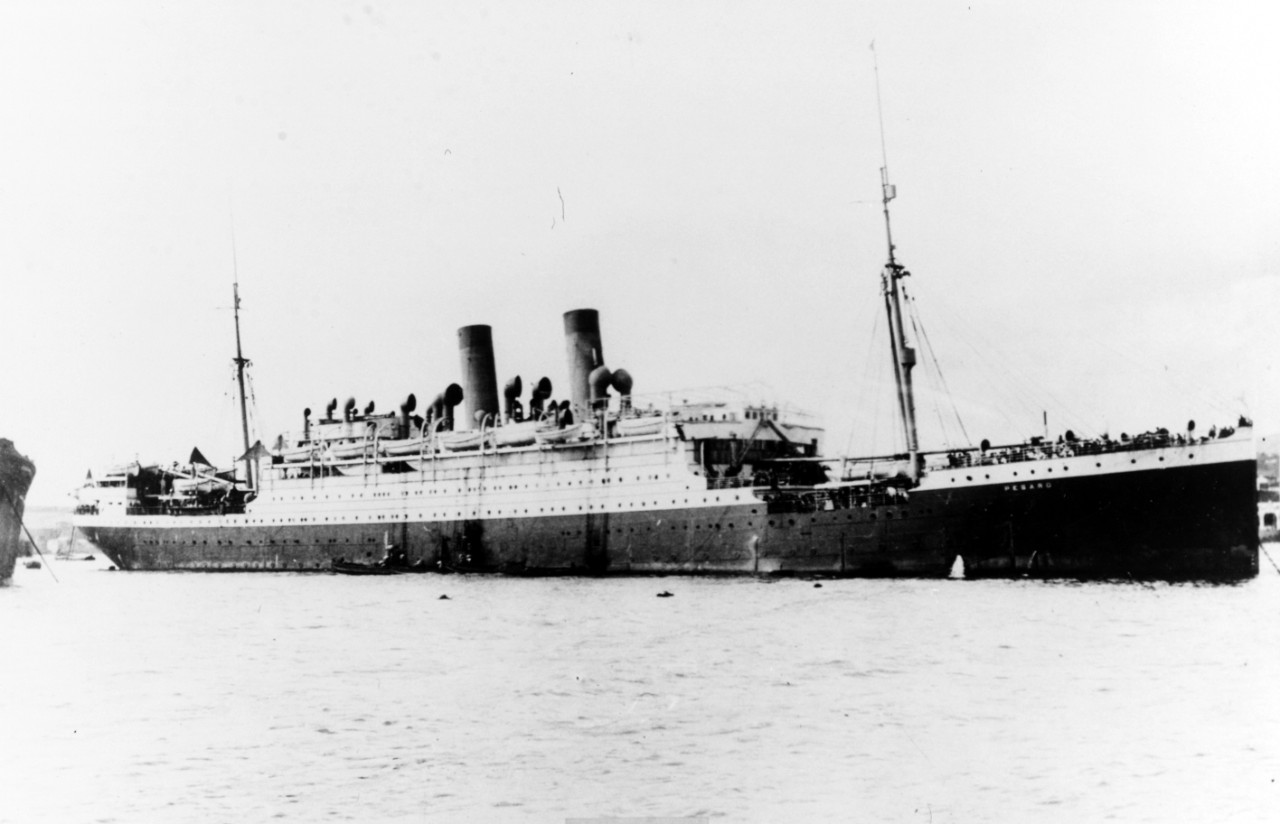
- SS Pesaro (formerly the SS Moltke), 1917

History

German Empire
- Name: Moltke
- Namesake: Helmuth von Moltke the Elder
- Owner: Hamburg America Line
- Builder: Blohm & Voss
- Launched: August 27, 1901
- Maiden voyage: February 22, 1902
- In service: 1902
- Fate: Seized by Italy, 1915
- Notes: Part of the Barbarossa-class ocean liner

Italy
- Name: Pesaro
- Acquired: May 25, 1915
- Out of service: 1925
- Fate: Sold for scrap in 1925

General characteristics
- Type: Ocean liner
- Tonnage: 12,335 GRT
- Length: 167.5 m (549 feet)
- Beam: 18.9 m (62 feet)
- Propulsion: 2 quadruple expansion engines
- Speed: 16 knots
- Capacity: 333 1st Class; 169 2nd Class; 1600 3nd Class
- Crew: 252

SS Moltke was a German ocean liner built by Blohm & Voss for the Hamburg America Line. She was named after Helmuth von Moltke. Sister ship to the SS Blücher, she was launched in 1901, and sailed her maiden voyage in February the following year. According to the New Haven Morning Journal and Courier, she "was built for the eastern service of the line, but on nearing completion her interior arrangements were adapted to the New York service at Hamburg." Her first commanding officer was Captain Christian Dempwolf.

== History ==
Following the launch of the Moltke, newspapers reported that she would provide service on "the route between New York, Plymouth, Cherbourg, and Hamburg," operating in conjunction with other ships "to maintain a weekly service." She and her sister ship, the Blücher, were described as each being "12,000 tons, 525 feet in length, 62 feet in breadth, and 45 feet in depth," and were "equipped with two sets of quadruple-expansion engines, developing 8,000 horsepower, and capable of driving the vessels at sixteen knots' speed," which meant that the passages between Cherbourg and New York and between Hamburg and New York would take nine and ten days, respectively.

In 1902, the travel department of The Buffalo Express newspaper advertised "Thos. Cook & Sons' special charter of the newest and finest express passenger steamship afloat" for a "trip without an equal in the wide world." The seventy-day cruise to "the Mediterranean, the Orient, Egypt, the Holy Land, etc., etc." cost "$300 and upwards."

Her arrival and departure schedules were subsequently published on a regular basis by The New York Times and other American newspapers during the early 1900s.

Captain Christian Dempwolf remained in command of the Moltke as of early December 1908, according to news reports, but left the Moltke in late August 1909 in order to accept a promotion from Hamburg-Amerika to commander of the SS Cleveland.

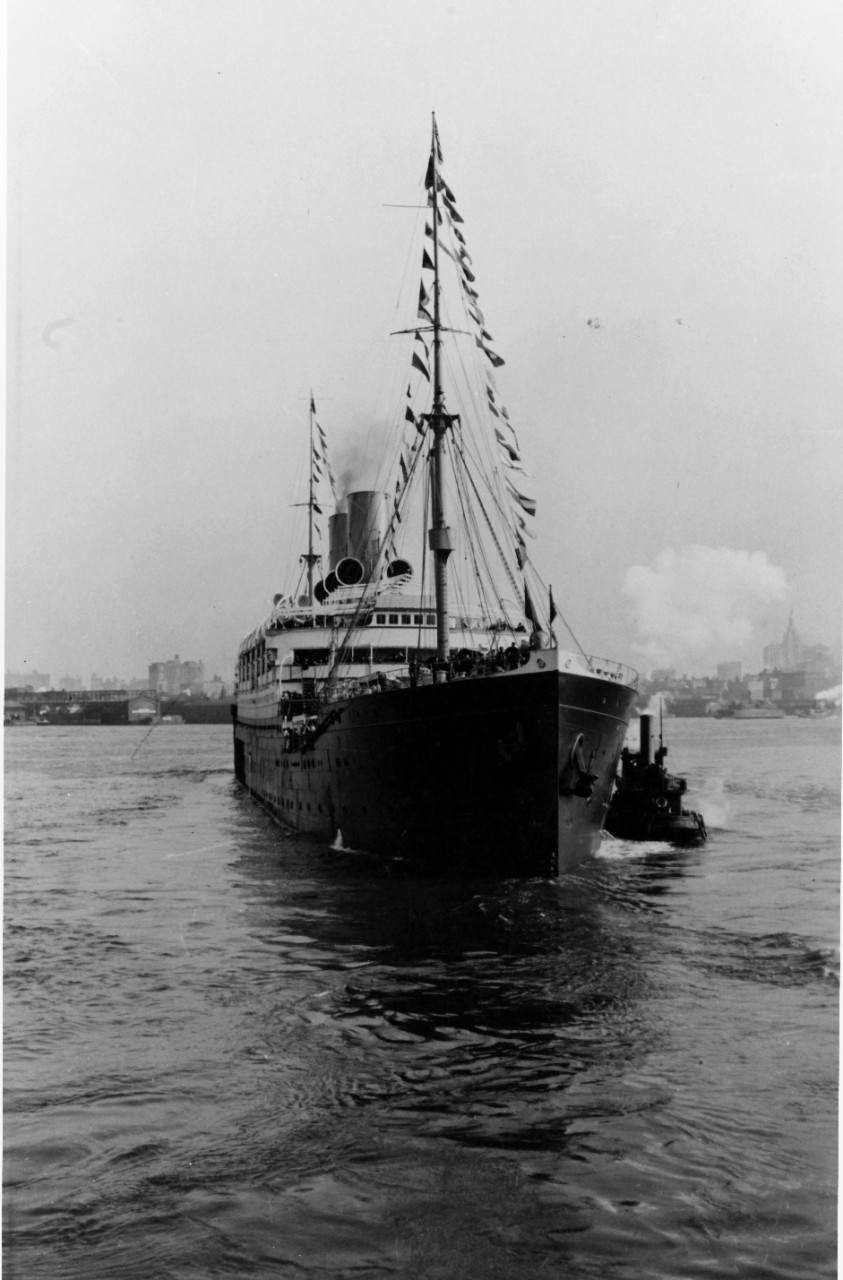
SS Moltke shown leaving Hoboken, New Jersey, possibly on return phase of her maiden voyage, September 1902.

In 1910, she was described by her owners as the "largest Steamship ever sent to the Caribbean" in a St. Louis Globe advertisement promoting her sixteen and twenty-eight-day cruises to the West Indies. In 1912, "delightful cruises to the West Indies, Panama and the Spanish Main" of twenty-eight days in duration were estimated to cost "$150 dollars and up," according to newspaper and magazine advertisements purchased by the ship's owner.

Throughout this period of the ship's history, newspapers also regularly reported the names of passengers who traveled on the Moltke, tracking their departures and arrivals via social and personal news columns, as The Montclair Times had done in 1907 with "Dr. Irving A. Meeker, of Upper Montclair, who [had] been spending the summer abroad" and had "sailed from Naples," Italy on August 15 and was expected to arrive "in Montclair August 28th."

During World War I, Moltke was laid up at Genoa, Italy, and was seized in 1915 after Italy joined the war. On 23 April 1919, Moltke was renamed Pesaro and used as an Italian merchant ship by the Lloyd Sabaudo for the first time on the route from Genoa via Marseille to New York City.

Post-war, she continued to transport immigrants from Europe to America for several more years before finally being taken out of service and scrapped in 1926.

== Accommodations and amenities ==
Amenities aboard the Moltke included a grill room and gymnasium, which were located on the boat deck, and a "saloon deck," which featured a saloon with seating capacity for 225 passengers. The ship's main and upper decks were "devoted entirely to staterooms" while the "second cabin accommodations" were described as "splendid."

== Controversies ==
In early 1903, American newspapers reported that "several German army and naval officers, passengers on the steamer Moltke, which arrived here yesterday [in Havana, Cuba] on a cruise through the West Indies, made extensive soundings in Havana Harbor near Santa Clara battery, garrisoned by American troops," adding that those German officers "also took photographs of the fortifications," reports that newspaper editors deemed "significant" due to "the attitude of Germany in Venezuela."

In 1915, the steamer Pesaro (formerly the Moltke) was seized by the government of Italy "for damages arising from failure to deliver certain silk accepted by her at Italy," and then became the subject of litigation at the Supreme Court of the United States in 1926 related to America's definition of sovereign immunity in "Berizzi Bros. Co. v. SS Pesaro." According to Barbara Spicer, "the Supreme Court faced for the first time the issue whether a merchant vessel owned, possessed and operated by a foreign sovereign in the carriage of merchandise for hire was immune from arrest upon a libel in rem.... [T]he Court went on to hold that the principles of immunity which were enunciated in that decision were pertinent to the Berizzi case," and reversed a lower court's decision which stated that "as the Pesaro was employed as an ordinary merchant vessel for commercial purposes at a time when no emergency existed or was declared, she should not be immune from arrest in admiralty, especially as no exemption has been claimed for her, by reason of her sovereign or political character, through the official channels of the United States."

== Notable passengers ==
On September 27, 1903, American sociologist Albion Woodbury Small, founder of the Department of Sociology at the University of Chicago, returned from a trip to Europe with his wife and daughter, Lina, aboard the Moltke.

In 1904, Maksymilian Faktorowicz, a "successful cosmetician and wigmaker [who] was appointed by Russian nobility to be the official cosmetics expert to the Royal Family and the Imperial Russian Grand Opera," and who would later become renowned in America as Max Factor, emigrated from Russia with his wife and children. Departing from the Port of Hamburg, Germany aboard the Moltke, he traveled with his family in steerage class, arriving at Ellis Island in New York City on February 25, 1904. After relocating to Los Angeles, California, he became a "pioneer of theatrical film makeup" in the Hollywood movie industry, and founded Max Factor & Company.

In 1910, Francis (Frank) W. Wozencraft (1892–1966), then an undergraduate at the University of Texas, crossed to Europe on the "Moltke" to study there. After service in World War I, Wozencraft was elected youngest mayor of Dallas, Texas, 1919–1921. Wozencraft went on to a distinguished legal career, working as general counsel for Radio Corporation of America and on various international commissions. A letter on ship's letterhead informs his college English teacher, Leonidas W. Payne, that the 18-year-old Wozencraft has completed a writing examination in the "smoker" of the ship. The young man reports that, though the ship's "party is composed almost entirely of ladies," he has been enjoying the company of the "pullets among the hens". The letter is in the archive of Leonidas W. Payne's papers in the Harry Ransom Humanities Research Center, University of Texas at Austin.

In 1913, sixteen-year-old Assunta Saltarini Modotti emigrated from Italy. Departing from Genoa aboard the Moltke on June 24, she traveled alone, according to Letizia Argenteri, author of Tina Modotti: Between Art and Revolution, arriving on July 8 at Ellis Island, where she "declared herself to be single, five feet one inch tall, in good mental and physical health, and a student." She carried with her "100 dollars and a train ticket for San Francisco, where her father and her sister Mercedes resided." By the 1920s, Tina Modotti was well on her way to becoming an acclaimed photographer and documentarian.
