= SS Königin Luise (1896) =

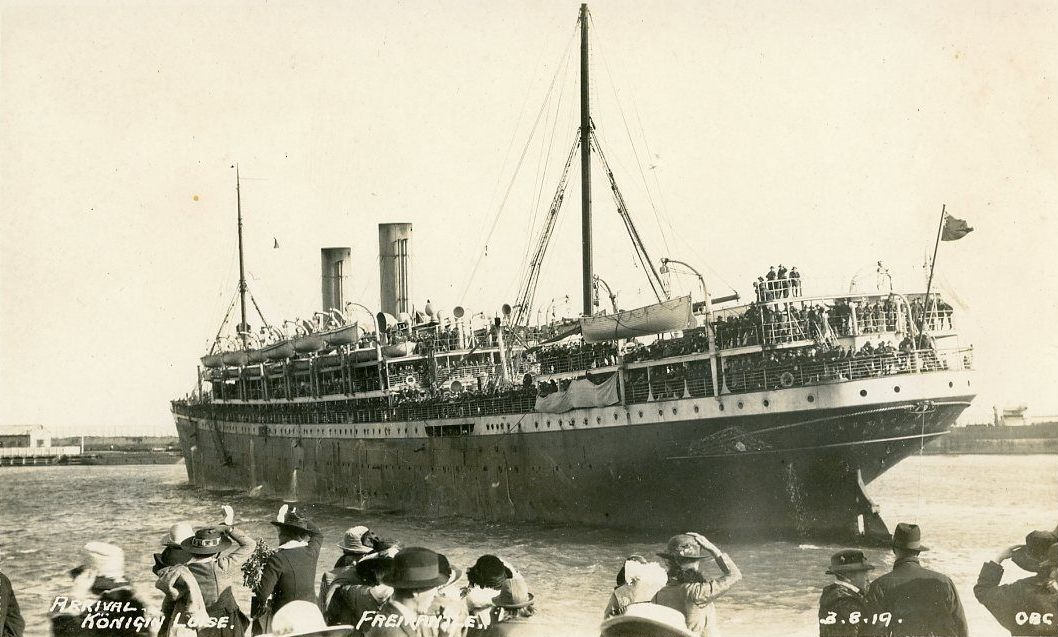
- Königin Luise arriving in Fremantle, 1919

History

German Empire
- Name: Königin Luise
- Namesake: Queen Louise of Prussia
- Owner: Norddeutscher Lloyd
- Builder: AG Vulcan; Stettin, Germany
- Yard number: 232
- Launched: 17 October 1896
- Fate: Handed to Great Britain as war reparations April 10, 1919

United Kingdom
- Name: Königin Luise
- Owner: UK Shipping Controller
- Operator: Orient Steam Navigation Company London
- Acquired: 1919
- Renamed: 1921, Omar
- Fate: Sold to Byron SS Co. London, July 1924

United Kingdom
- Name: Edison
- Owner: Byron SS Co London
- Operator: Byron SS Co London
- Acquired: July 1924
- Fate: Scrapped in Italy 1935

General characteristics
- Class & type: Barbarossa-class ocean liner
- Tonnage: 11,103 GRT
- Length: 523.1 ft (159.4 m) p/p 552 ft (168 m) o/a
- Beam: 60.1 ft (18.3 m)
- Depth: 34.9 ft (10.6 m)
- Installed power: 846 NHP, 8,000 hp or 6,000 kW
- Propulsion: two quadruple-expansion steam engines, twin screws
- Speed: 15 knots (28 km/h)
- Capacity: 225 1st class; 235 2nd class; 1,940 steerage
- Complement: 231

SS Königin Luise ("Queen Louise") was a Barbarossa-class ocean liner built in 1896 by Vulcan Shipbuilding Corp. of Stettin, Germany, for the North German Lloyd line of Bremen. She served on the company's Australian, Far East, and North Atlantic routes for nearly two decades.

During World War I, Königin Luise was one of only two ships of her class to avoid being interned in neutral ports, spending the war in German ports. After the war, Königin Luise was allocated as war reparations to the United Kingdom, sold to the Orient Steam Navigation Company in 1921 and renamed Omar. She was sold again in 1924 to the Byron SS Co of London and operated on the Piraeus – New York service until scrapped in 1935.

== Königin Luise ==
Königin Luise was built by AG Vulcan for the North German Lloyd (NDL) line and completed 17 March 1896.

Along with her sister ships Friedrich der Grosse, Barbarossa and Bremen, the Königin Luise worked Australian, Far East, and North Atlantic routes for NDL. On Australian and Far East voyages she used the Suez Canal, and was one of the largest ships regularly using the canal.

At the outbreak of World War I Königin Luise was in port in Germany, thus avoiding internment, and due to the Royal Navy blockade, she was laid up. Following the Armistice, she was allocated as war reparations to the UK, and was surrendered to the UK Shipping Controller on 10 April 1919. She was allocated to the Orient Steam Navigation Company.

In mid 1919, she departed from Devonport, England, carrying Australian troops returning home, including Victoria Cross winner James Park Woods. On 20 October 1919, British troops embarked her (now described as HT Konigin Luise) in India to travel to England. On 8 September 1920, during third London – Australia voyage, she collided at Lisbon with the British steamship Loughborough, which sank.

== Omar ==
In January 1921 the ship was sold to the Orient Steam Navigation Company, which renamed her Omar.

== Edison ==
The ship was again sold in July 1924 to Byron SS Co. of London, and renamed Edison. She worked the Piraeus – New York route until being scrapped in 1935 in Italy.
