= SS Cleveland =

Former German transatlantic ocean liner

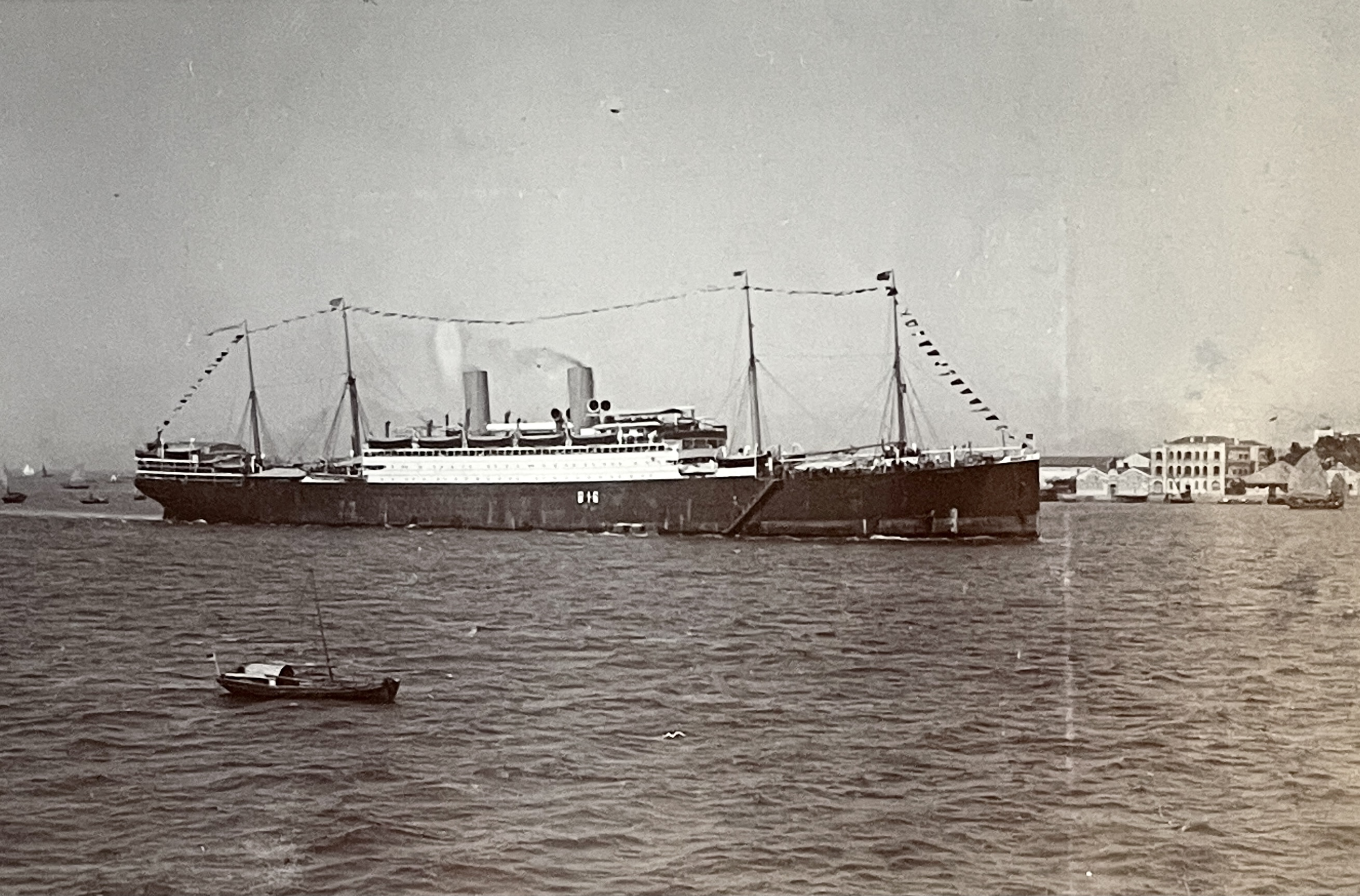
- Cleveland in Hong Kong, 1909.

History
- Name: 1908: Cleveland; 1919: Mobile; 1920: King Alexander; 1923: Cleveland
- Namesake: 1908, 1923: Cleveland; 1919: Mobile; 1920: Alexander of Greece
- Owner: 1908: HAPAG; 1919: United States Navy; 1919: US Shipping Board; 1920: Byron Steamship Co; 1923: United American Lines; 1926: HAPAG
- Port of registry: 1908: (German Empire) Hamburg; 1919: (United States); 1920: (United Kingdom) London; 1923: Panama City; 1926: (Weimar Republic) Hamburg
- Route: 1909: Hamburg – New York; 1913: Hamburg – Boston; 1920: Greece – United States; 1923: Hamburg – New York
- Builder: Blohm & Voss, Hamburg
- Launched: 26 September 1908
- Maiden voyage: 27 March 1909
- Identification: by 1913: wireless call sign DDV; early 1919: code letters GJBP; late 1919: code letters NIVB; 1920: UK official number 144470; 1920: code letters KDRF; 1926: code letters RFVB
- Fate: Scrapped 1933

General characteristics
- Tonnage: 16,970 GRT, 10,145 NRT
- Displacement: 27,000 tons
- Length: 588.9 ft (179.5 m)
- Beam: 65.3 ft (19.9 m)
- Draught: 50 ft 0 in (15.24 m)
- Depth: 46.6 ft (14.2 m)
- Decks: 3
- Installed power: by 1930: 2,046 NHP
- Propulsion: as built: 2 × screws, 2 × quadruple expansion engines; from 1929: as above plus; 2 × exhaust steam turbines
- Speed: 16 knots (30 km/h)
- Capacity: passengers, 1908: 246 first class; 332 second class; 448 third class; 1,801 steerage class; troops, 1919: 4,620; refrigerated cargo: 29,577 cubic feet (838 m^{3})
- Crew: 1919: 573
- Sensors & processing systems: by 1930: wireless direction finding; submarine signalling
- Notes: sister ship: Cincinnati

SS Cleveland was a German transatlantic ocean liner that was launched in 1908 and scrapped in 1933. Cleveland was built for the Hamburg America Line (HAPAG) as a sister ship for Cincinnati.

In 1919 Cleveland became the troop ship USS Mobile (ID-4030). In 1920 it returned to civilian service as the UK liner King Alexander. In 1923 United American Lines bought her and restored it original name Cleveland.

In 1926 HAPAG bought Cleveland back. It was laid up from 1931 and scrapped in 1933.

== Building ==
Blohm & Voss built Cleveland at Hamburg. She was launched on 26 September 1908, two months after her sister Cincinnati.

Cleveland's registered length was 588.9 ft (179.5 m), her beam was 65.3 ft (19.9 m) and her depth was 46.6 ft (14.2 m). Her tonnages were 16,970 GRT and 10,145 NRT. As built, she had berths for 2,827 passengers: 246 first class, 332 second class, 448 third class and 1,801 steerage class. She also had 29,577 cubic feet (838 m^{3}) of refrigerated hold space for perishable cargo.

Cleveland had twin screws, each driven by a quadruple expansion steam engine. They gave her a speed of 16 knots (30 km/h).

== Early career ==
Cleveland began her maiden voyage from Hamburg to New York on 27 March 1909. Late that August, HAPAG transferred Captain Christian Dempwolf from Moltke to be Master of Cleveland.

Cleveland spent the next five years mostly in scheduled transatlantic service. She also made six cruises around the World. On 24 January 1912 she was being moved in Honolulu Harbor when her pilot, Milton P Sanders, died of a heart attack. As a result, control of Cleveland was lost, and her bow collided with the stern of the cruiser USS Colorado.

By 1913 Cleveland was equipped for wireless telegraphy. Her call sign was DDV.

HAPAG had scheduled further World cruises for Cleveland and her sister for 1915. Cleveland was due to leave Hamburg on 14 January 1915 and return on 4 June. Instead, in the First World War HAPAG suspended its passenger services and Cleveland was laid up in Hamburg.

== War reparations ==
In 1919 the United States Government seized Cincinnati as World War I reparations. She was converted at Liverpool, England into a troop ship with berths for 4,620 troops, and commissioned as USS Mobile.

Mobile made nine transatlantic crossings from France to the USA, repatriating a total of 21,073 US troops. In November 1919 she was decommissioned and relinquished to the United States Shipping Board.

White Star Line briefly chartered Mobile, and then the Byron Steamship Company bought her and renamed her King Alexander after Alexander of Greece. The company was a UK-based subsidiary of the National Greek Line. Hence King Alexander was registered in London but her new route was between Greece and the USA.

In 1923 United American Lines bought King Alexander and restored her original name Cleveland. Prohibition in the United States had begun in 1920, so UAL registered her in Panama to enable her to serve liquor aboard. UAL had Cleveland refitted in Hamburg and restored to her Hamburg – New York route.

== Final years ==
In 1926 HAPAG bought back Cleveland and two other former HAPAG passenger liners from UAL for ℛℳ 10 million.

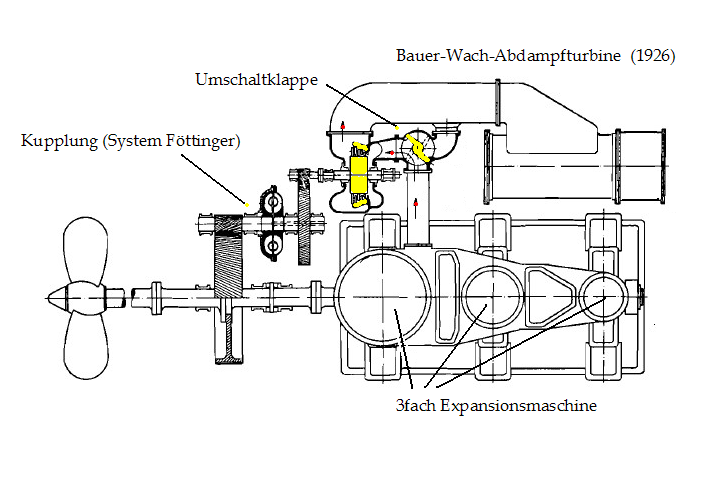
Plan of a triple-expansion piston engine with Bauer-Wach exhaust turbine system. Cleveland had quadruple-expansion engines, but the arrangement of her turbines was similar.

In 1929 a Bauer-Wach exhaust turbine system was added to each of Cleveland's engines. Exhaust steam from the low-pressure cylinder drove a turbine, which via double-reduction gearing and a Föttinger fluid coupling drove the same shaft as the reciprocating engine. The two turbines increased Cleveland's total installed power to 2,046 NHP.

Cleveland was laid up from 1931. In 1933 HAPAG sold her back to Blohm & Voss for scrap.

== Bibliography ==
- The Marconi Press Agency Ltd (1913). The Year Book of Wireless Telegraphy and Telephony. London: The St Katherine Press.
- Wilson, RM (1956). The Big Ships. London: Cassell & Co.
