= USS Tuluran =

Cargo ship of the United States Navy

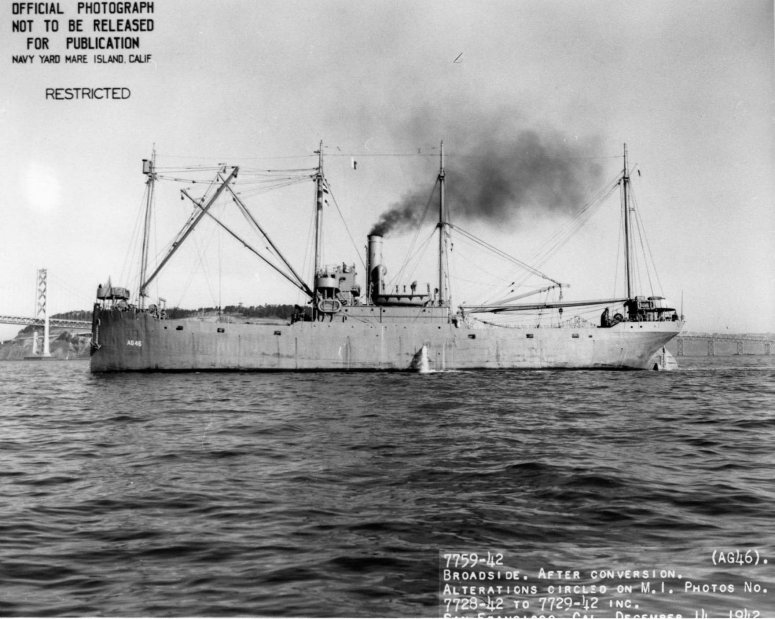
- USS Tuluran (AG-46)

History

United States
- Name: Lake Superior; C. D. Johnston III; Anna Shafer; Tuluran; Anna Shafer
- Namesake: As Tuluran: Island of Tuluran
- Builder: Toledo Shipbuilding, Co., Toledo, Ohio
- Yard number: 141
- Laid down: as War Bayonet
- Launched: 31 October 1917
- Completed: October 1917 as Lake Superior
- Acquired: by the Navy, 30 January 1918; again on 16 October 1942
- Commissioned: 30 January 1918 as Lake Superior (ID 2995)
- Decommissioned: 31 July 1919
- In service: 11 December 1942 as USS Tuluran (AG-46)
- Out of service: 20 December 1945, at San Francisco, California
- Stricken: 8 January 1946
- Identification: Official number: 215756
- Fate: Sold for scrap 7 January 1947

General characteristics
- Type: commercial cargo ship
- Tonnage: 1,984 GRT
- Displacement: From DANFS; 4,300 tons (1918); 4,500 tons (1942)
- Length: 261 ft (79.6 m) LOA; 251 ft (76.5 m) LBP
- Beam: 43 ft 6 in (13.3 m) on waterline
- Draft: 18 ft 6 in (5.6 m) (mean)
- Depth of hold: 20 ft 8 in (6.3 m)
- Propulsion: triple expansion reciprocating steam engine, single shaft, 1,150shp
- Speed: 10 knots
- Crew: Navy WW I: 10 officers, 42 enlisted; Commercial: 26; Navy WW II: 45
- Armament: World War I: 1 5"/50 caliber gun & 1 3"/50 caliber gun; World War II: 1 3"/50 dual purpose gun mount; 3 20mm AA gun mount

USS Tuluran (AG-46) was under construction for the British at the Toledo Shipbuilding Company as the cargo ship War Bayonet in 1917 when requisitioned by the United States Shipping Board (USSB) for World War I service. The ship was launched and completed as Lake Superior. The Navy acquired the ship from the USSB with assignment to the Naval Overseas Transport Service (NOTS) with the identification number ID-2995. The ship was returned to the USSB which sold the vessel in 1926. The ship was renamed C. D. Johnston III and that vessel operated out of Oregon until again sold and based in San Francisco. Another sale resulted in the vessel being renamed Anna Shafer which was acquired by the War Shipping Administration (WSA) in 1942 and allocated to the Navy for World War II service.

== Construction ==
The ship, War Bayonet was one of seven cargo ships under construction in 1917 for the British Shipping Controller at Toledo, Ohio, by the Toledo Shipbuilding Company that were requisitioned by the (USSB. (Note: The ship was British specified and thus not one of the standard USSB ships of World War I.) The ship was Toledo's yard hull number 141 that after requisition was renamed Lake Superior, launched 31 October 1917 with official number 215756.

1918 Navy ship's data shows the ship as having two boilers providing steam for a triple expansion engine giving a speed of 10 kn (12 mph; 19 km/h) to the 1,984 GRT, 4,300 tons displacement, with an overall length of 261 ft (79.6 m), length between perpendiculars of 251 ft (76.5 m), breadth on load water line of 43 ft 6 in (13.3 m), a mean draft of 18 ft 6 in (5.6 m) with depth of hold being 20 ft 8 in (6.3 m). As a World War I naval auxiliary the ship was crewed by 10 officers and forty-two men and armed with one 5 inch/50 caliber and one 3 inch/50 caliber gun.

== World War I service ==
War Bayonet was acquired by the Navy 12 December 1917 and commissioned 30 January 1918 as Lake Superior designated ID-2995. Lake Superior was assigned to the Naval Overseas Transport Service (NOTS) designated as a mine transport, but also functioning in other roles, including gasoline, coal and cargo transport.

In February 1918 the transport delivered a cargo of gasoline to Bermuda with a return to Norfolk before making a coaling run to Halifax, Nova Scotia and back to Norfolk in March. The ship departed Norfolk 10 May for Oban, Scotland with a load of mines and military supplies reaching Oban on 28 May. From Oban Lake Superior went to the Klye and Clyde areas of Scotland with a 7–20 June return voyage to Norfolk. Two similar trips were made Between 18 July and 6 December 1918. Between 14 December 1918 and 20 February 1919 the ship transported coal to Bermuda and the Florida ports of Key West and Pensacola. From 6 March to 7 April the ship transported Marine Corps aviation equipment to the West Indies. For the remainder of service the ship operated as a cargo transport on the Atlantic coast from Guantanamo Bay, Cuba to Melville, Rhode Island. On 21 July Lake Superior arrived in Norfolk from New York and decommissioned on 31 July 1919 to be returned to the USSB.

== Civilian service ==
The ship was sold by USSB in 1926 to the Pacific Spruce Corporation of Newport Oregon, renamed C. D. Johnston III with home port of Newport, Oregon. The vessels signal letters were LJFM with crew noted as twenty-six.

The Times-Mirror Company of Los Angeles bought the ship in 1932 to transport newsprint. The ship was sold in 1934 to Shafer Brothers Steamship Line of San Francisco and renamed Anna Shafer.

== World War II service ==
Anna Shafer was acquired by the WSA on 10 July 1942 at San Pedro, California and turned over to the Navy on 16 October 1942. The Navy renamed the ship Tuluran, designated AG-46, and completed conversion at the General Engineering & Drydock Co., Alameda, California, on 8 December 1942. Tuluran was commissioned at San Francisco, California, on 11 December 1942.

Three days later, Tuluran joined the U.S. Pacific Fleet Service Force. On Christmas Eve, the ship stood out of San Francisco, bound for the South Pacific Ocean. After stopping at Pearl Harbor from 6 January to 22 February 1943, Tuluran continued on to Samoa, arriving in Tutuila on the 28th. She operated at Samoa for the next nine months before departing Tutuila on 26 November bound for the United States. After a one-day stop at Pearl Harbor on 11 December, she continued on to San Diego, California, where she arrived on 23 December. For the next four months, Tuluran underwent an extensive overhaul.

On 19 April 1944, Tuluran departed the U.S. West Coast to return to the South Pacific Ocean and duty shuttling cargo between bases in the rear areas of the war zone. She stopped at Pearl Harbor from 29 April to 2 May and returned to Tutuila on 13 May.

This time, however, she only remained overnight and, the following day, resumed her voyage. The cargo ship reached the New Hebrides Islands on the 21st. Eight days later, Tuluran departed Espiritu Santo to deliver cargo to the southern Solomon Islands. She reached Guadalcanal on 5 June and remained there until the 20th when she headed back to the New Hebrides, arriving at Espiritu Santo on 3 July. She remained until early August when she moved to the New Guinea area where she operated from 17 August until the beginning of October, when she steamed via Espiritu Santo to the Solomons. After serving at Guadalcanal until mid-November, the ship made her first voyage to the Central Pacific.

Following visits to Saipan in the Mariana Islands and to Peleliu in the Palau Islands, she returned to the southwestern Pacific in mid-December. She visited the Russell Islands subgroup in the Solomons from 17 to 19 December and spent a month at Nouméa, New Caledonia, from 24 December 1944 to 24 January 1945, before returning to Espiritu Santo on the 27th. She departed the New Hebrides once more on 19 February and headed back to the Solomon Islands, where she operated for the next two months. During that tour of duty, she returned to Guadalcanal first and then visited the Treasury Islands subgroup, Bougainville, the Green Islands, and the Russell Islands again as well as making a side trip to Emirau Island.

On 3 April, the cargo ship departed the Russell subgroup and headed back to the Central Pacific. For the remainder of the war, Tuluran carried cargo between the American bases and anchorages established at various atolls in the Marshall Islands, the Caroline Islands, and the Mariana Islands. Her itinerary over the last five months of the war included Eniwetok, Ulithi, Peleliu, Guam, and Saipan. On 8 August, a week before the cessation of hostilities, Tuluran stood out of Eniwetok bound for Hawaii. Japan capitulated a week before the ship arrived in Pearl Harbor. Tuluran spent three days at Oahu and then continued her voyage east on 24 August.

== Post-war dispositioning ==
On 3 September, she entered San Francisco; and, on 20 December 1945, Tuluran was decommissioned. She was stripped of usable materiel at Mare Island Naval Shipyard. Her name was struck from the Navy List on 8 January 1946, and the Commandant, 12th Naval District, turned her over to the U.S. Maritime Commission for final disposition on 1 July 1946. The ship entered the Suisun Bay Reserve Fleet on 30 June 1946 and on 7 January 1947 purchased by American Iron & Metal and subsequently scrapped.
