= SS Hamburg =

A number of steamships were named Hamburg, including:

- SS Hamburg (1899), later USS Powhatan
- SS Hamburg (1925)
- SS Hamburg (1969), later SS Hanseatic and then SS Maxim Gorkiy
