= SS König Albert =

Barbarossa-class ocean liner

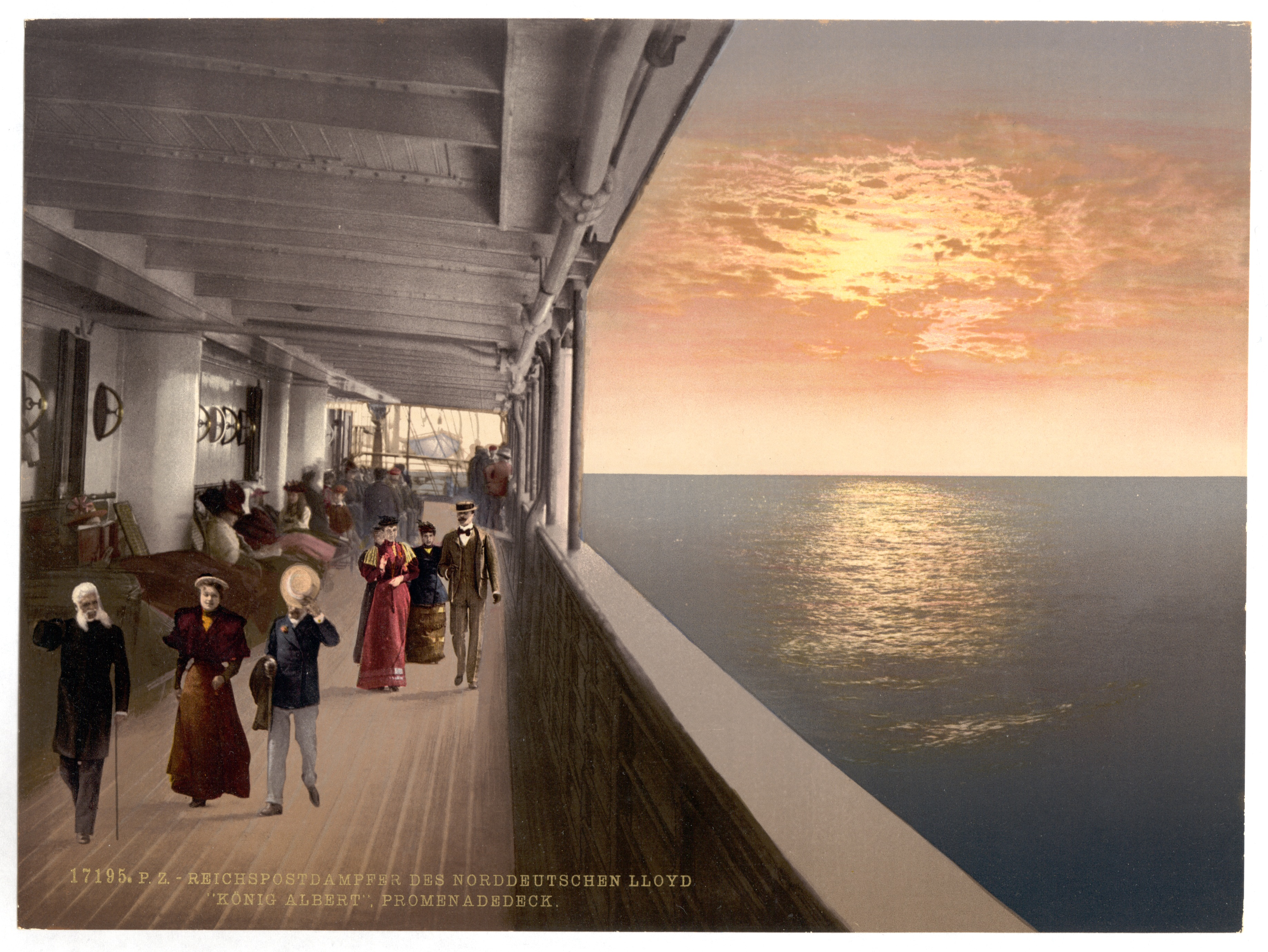
- Photochrom image of the promenade deck

History

German Empire
- Name: König Albert
- Owner: Norddeutscher Lloyd
- Builder: Stettiner Vulcan, Stettin, Germany
- Yard number: 242
- Launched: 24 June 1899
- Maiden voyage: 4 October 1899
- Fate: Seized by Italian Government 25 May 1915

Kingdom of Italy
- Name: Fernandino Palasciano
- Acquired: 1915
- Renamed: 1923, Italia
- Fate: Broken up in Italy, 1926

General characteristics
- Tonnage: 10,484 GRT
- Length: 521 ft (158.8 m)
- Beam: 60.2 ft (18.3 m)
- Propulsion: 2 × quadruple-expansion steam engines, 8,000 hp (6,000 kW); twin screw propellers
- Speed: 15.5 knots (28.7 km/h)
- Capacity: 257 first class, 119 second class, 1,799 third class. 2,175 total
- Crew: 230

SS König Albert was a German Barbarossa-class ocean liner owned by the Norddeutscher Lloyd Line. Interned in Italy at the outbreak of World War I, she was seized by the Italian Government in 1915 and converted to a hospital ship. Sold into merchant service in 1920, she was used as a transport for the Royal Italian Navy, before being scrapped in 1926.

== History ==
=== SS König Albert ===
König Albert was built by Stettiner Vulcan of Stettin, Germany for the Norddeutscher Lloyd Line of Bremen, and launched in 1899. She sailed on her maiden voyage from Hamburg, via the Suez Canal to the Far East. She completed eight round voyages on this service and was then transferred on 3 March 1903 to the Bremen - Cherbourg - New York City route for a single voyage. On 16 April 1903 she went to the Genoa - Naples - New York City run and stayed mainly on this service until commencing her last voyage on 11 June 1914.

On the outbreak of World War I, König Albert, like many other German ships, was interned in a neutral country to avoid capture by the Royal Navy. When Italy joined the war in May 1915, the ship was seized by the Italian Government.

=== As the Ferdinando Palasciano ===
The ship was converted to a hospital ship and renamed the Ferdinando Palasciano, after the Italian physician and politician Ferdinando Palasciano. On 20 January 1916 off the Albanian coast she was captured as a prize by the Austro-Hungarian Navy U-boat U-11, and escorted into their naval base of Cattaro (the event famously painted by Alexander Kircher). She was later handed back to the Italians. The reasons for this are unknown, but possibly done due to her hospital .

In 1920, the ship was chartered to Navigazione Generale Italiana of Genoa and on 15 June 1920 commenced her first voyage Genoa - Naples - New York. She completed six round trip voyages on this route, the last one commencing 13 April 1921.
