= SS Blücher =

Ocean liner (1901–1929)

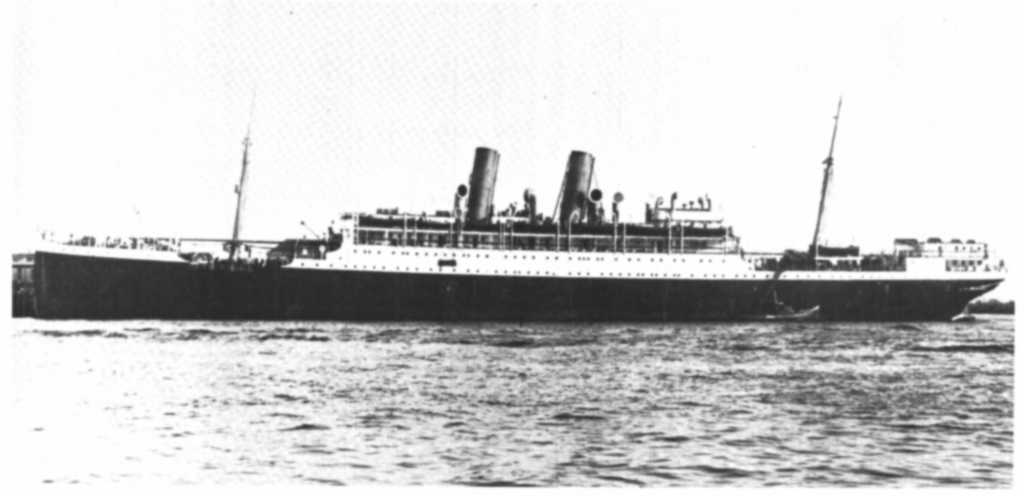
- The SS Blucher c. 1905

History

German Empire
- Name: Blücher
- Namesake: Gebhard Leberecht von Blücher
- Owner: Hamburg America Line
- Route: Hamburg–New York (1901–1911); Hamburg–South America (1911–1914)
- Builder: Blohm & Voss, Hamburg
- Launched: 23 November 1901
- Maiden voyage: 7 June 1902
- Fate: Interned at Pernambuco, Brazil, August 1914; Seized by Brazil, 1 June 1917

Brazil
- Name: Leopoldina
- Acquired: By seizure, 1 June 1917
- Fate: Sold to France, 27 February 1918

France
- Name: Suffren
- Namesake: Pierre André de Suffren de Saint Tropez
- Owner: Compagnie Générale Transatlantique
- Route: Havre - New York
- Acquired: By charter, 11 March 1920; Bought, March 1923
- Out of service: September 1928
- Refit: December 1920
- Fate: Scrapped at Genoa, 1929

General characteristics
- Class & type: Barbarossa-class ocean liner
- Tonnage: 12,334 GRT
- Length: 525 ft 6 in (160.17 m)
- Beam: 62 ft 3 in (18.97 m)
- Propulsion: 2 × quadruple expansion steam engines; 2 shafts
- Speed: 16 knots (30 km/h; 18 mph)
- Capacity: Passengers (as built): 390 × 1st class; 230 × 2nd class; 1,550 × 3rd class; After 1920 refit; 500 × cabin class; 250 × 3rd class

SS Blücher was a Barbarossa-class ocean liner built by Blohm & Voss Shipbuilders, Hamburg, Germany, in 1902 for the Hamburg America Line, to sail under the German flag. She measured 12,334 gross register tons and was 550 (bp) feet long by 62 feet wide. Steam quadruple-expansion engines powered twin screws. Her service speed was 16 knots. She originally carried 2,102 passengers, including 333 first class, 169 second class, and 1,600 third class, on four decks with a steel hull, and was served by a crew of 252. She was fitted with two masts and two funnels. She saw Hamburg-New York and Hamburg-South America service.

She was the sister ship to the SS Moltke.

== History ==
The Blücher was launched on November 23, 1901. She set out on her maiden voyage on June 7, 1902, proceeding from Hamburg to Boulogne to Southampton, then finally to New York, where she arrived at Ellis Island on June 28. She serviced this route until 1911.

In 1912, she was rebuilt, with luxury suites added to her boat deck.

She was interned at Pernambuco, Brazil in August 1914. On June 1, 1917, she was seized by the Brazilian government, who renamed her Leopoldina. On February 27, 1918, she was chartered to the French government.

On March 11, 1920, she began her first voyage for Compagnie Générale Transatlantique (CGT, "French Line") from New York to Le Havre. In December 1921, she was laid up. In March 1923, she was sold to CGT and renamed Suffren, as which on May 8, 1923, she made her first voyage, Le Havre to New York. At this time, she could accommodate 500 passengers in first class and 250 in third class.

She was laid up again in 1928 and scrapped in Genoa in 1929.
