= USS Powhatan (ID-3013) =

United States military transport ship

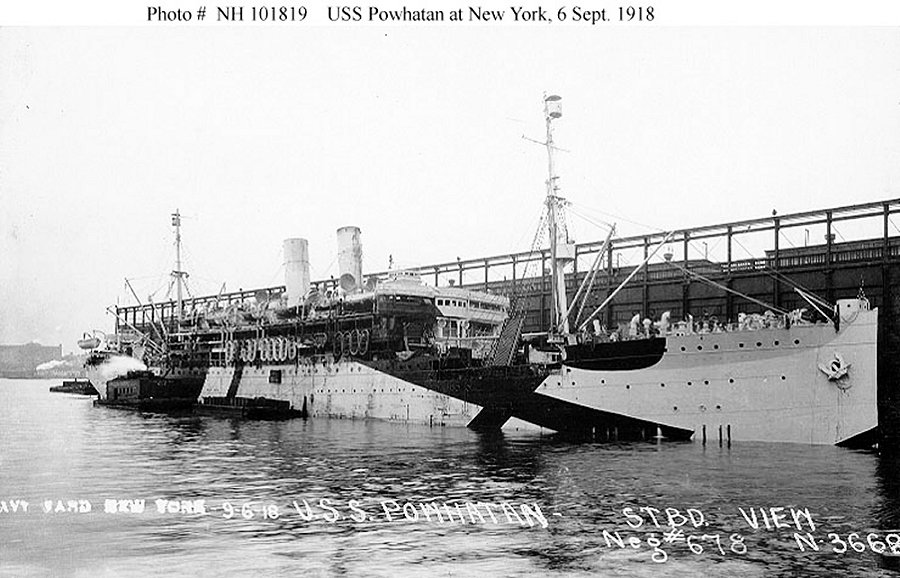
- USS Powhatan (ID-3013) docked at New York City.

History

German Empire
- Name: Hamburg
- Namesake: Hamburg
- Owner: Hamburg America Line
- Port of registry: Hamburg
- Builder: AG Vulcan, Stettin
- Yard number: 243
- Launched: 25 November 1899
- Identification: code letters RLNC; by 1913: call sign DDH
- Fate: Interned by the US, 1914; seized, 1917

United States
- Name: USS Hamburg (ID-3013)
- Namesake: Powhatan, father of Pocahontas
- Acquired: 6 April 1917
- Commissioned: 16 August 1917
- Decommissioned: 2 September 1919
- Renamed: USS Powhatan (ID-3013), 5 September 1917
- Fate: Sold into merchant service; sold for scrap 1928

General characteristics
- Class & type: Barbarossa-class ocean liner
- Tonnage: 10,531 GRT, 6,420 NRT
- Length: 544 ft 11.5 in (166.103 m) overall
- Beam: 60 ft 2 in (18.34 m)
- Draft: 30 ft (9.1 m)
- Depth: 34.7 ft (10.6 m)
- Decks: 4
- Installed power: 1,016 NHP
- Propulsion: 2 × quadruple-expansion engines; 2 × screws
- Speed: 16 kn (30 km/h)
- Complement: 533
- Armament: 4 × 6-inch/40-caliber guns; 2 × 1-pounder guns; 2 × machine guns

USS Powhatan (ID–3013) was a transport ship for the United States Navy during World War I. She was originally Hamburg, a Barbarossa-class ocean liner built in 1899 by AG Vulkan of Stettin, Germany, for the Hamburg America Line. At the outset of World War I the ship was interned by the United States.

She was soon chartered by the American Red Cross to take medical personnel and supplies to Europe. Renamed Red Cross, she left New York in mid-September, 1914.

When the US entered World War I in April 1917, she was seized and converted to a troop transport. Originally commissioned as USS Hamburg (ID-3013), the ship was renamed Powhatan on 5 September 1917. During World War I, she carried 15,274 troops to France and after the war she returned 11,803 servicemen to the United States.

After decommissioning by the US Navy, the ship was turned over to the United States Shipping Board, and chartered for mercantile service until broken up in 1928.

== History ==
=== Hamburg ===
Hamburg was originally intended to be named Bavaria. She was renamed only a month before launching. On completion, SS Hamburg served the Hamburg-Far East (until 1904 when Hapag and NDL no longer combined on the mail route), Hamburg-New York and Genoa-New York runs for the Hamburg America Line. The ship was also twice used by Kaiser Wilhelm II as his state yacht for foreign visits, during which time the ship was painted white overall.

=== Red Cross ===
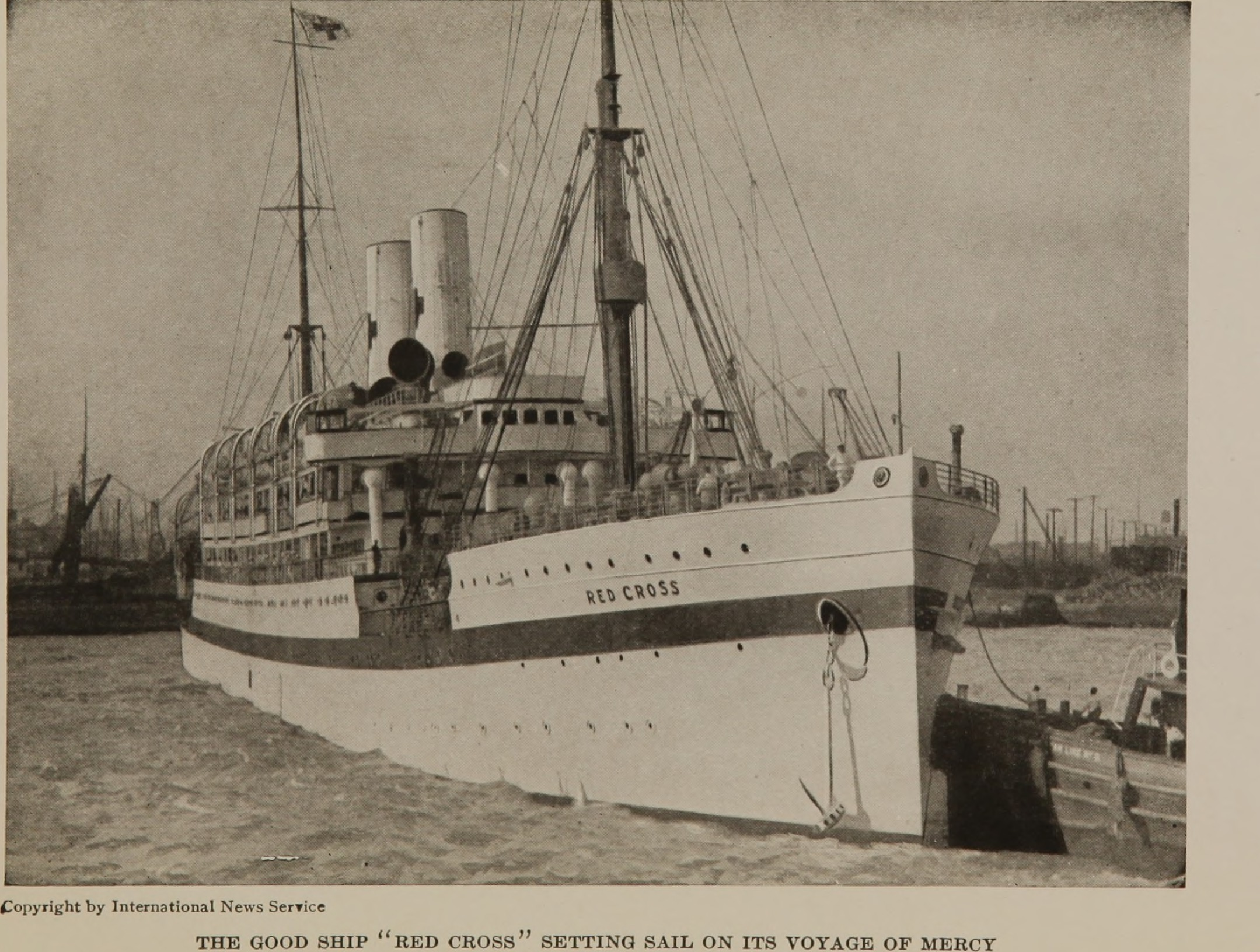
As a Red Cross ship

Due to British Royal Navy control of the seas she was caught in New York at the outbreak of World War I.

Chartered by the American Red Cross to take medical personnel and supplies to Europe and renamed Red Cross, she left New York in mid-September, 1914 and called at Falmouth, England; Paulliac, France; and Rotterdam, The Netherlands, before recrossing the Atlantic in October with American refugees on board. She remained at New York for the next two and a half years.

=== USS Hamburg and USS Powhatan ===
The ship was commissioned as the troop transport USS Hamburg by the United States Navy on 16 August 1917, with Commander Gatewood Lincoln in command. She was renamed Powhatan on 5 September 1917 and began the first of 12 consecutive Atlantic crossings on 12 November 1917. Powhatan was twice attacked by a submarine in the Bay of Biscay on 4 April 1918 but survived unscathed due to prompt location and depth charging by escorting destroyers. From 12 November 1917 to 9 December 1918, she carried 15,274 troops to France and after the war she returned 11,803 servicemen to the United States.

Powhatan was decommissioned on 2 September 1919 and was turned over to the Army Transport Service at New York, and finally to the United States Shipping Board.

=== New Rochelle and President Fillmore ===
In August, 1920, the ship was renamed New Rochelle and under charter to the Baltic Steamship Corp of America, sailed from New York to Danzig. On 11 February 1921 she sailed under charter to the United States Mail Steamship Company on the same run, and in May she was again renamed Hudson

On charter to the United States Lines in August 1921, she sailed from New York to Bremen, before being renamed President Fillmore in 1922. After round the world service with the Dollar Line of San Francisco, she was sold for breaking up in 1928
