= SS Mongolia =

SS Mongolia may refer to:

- SS Mongolia (Caird, 1903), a 9,505 GRT British passenger and cargo liner of the Peninsular and Oriental Steam Navigation Company (P&O) (sunk in 1917)
- SS Mongolia (1903), a 13,369 GRT American passenger and cargo liner of the Pacific Mail Steamship Company
- SS Mongolia (1922), a 16,504 GRT British passenger and cargo liner of the Peninsular and Oriental Steam Navigation Company (P&O)

== See also ==
- SS Mongolian (1890–1914)
