= USS Mercury (ID-3012) =

United States Navy World War I transport ship

- The SS Barbarossa

History

German Empire
- Name: SS Barbarossa
- Namesake: Frederick I, Holy Roman Emperor
- Owner: Norddeutscher Lloyd
- Builder: Blohm & Voss, Hamburg, Germany, Germany
- Yard number: 115
- Launched: 5 September 1896
- Fate: Interned by the United States, 1914; seized 6 April 1917

United States
- Name: USS Mercury
- Acquired: 6 April 1917
- Commissioned: 3 August 1917
- Decommissioned: 27 September 1919
- Stricken: 27 September 1919
- Fate: Transferred to the U.S. Army; later sold for scrap, 1924

General characteristics
- Tonnage: 10,769 GRT
- Displacement: 19,000 tons
- Length: 544 ft (166 m)
- Beam: 60 ft (18 m)
- Draft: 26 ft (7.9 m)
- Speed: 15 knots (28 km/h; 17 mph)
- Complement: 494
- Armament: 4 6", 2 1 pdr., 2 mg

USS Mercury (ID-3012) was a United States Navy transport ship during World War I. She was formerly the Norddeutscher Lloyd liner SS Barbarossa built by Blohm & Voss, Hamburg, Germany, in 1897, and operated by the North German Lloyd Line.

At the outset of World War I the ship was interned by the United States and, when that country entered the conflict in 1917, was seized and converted to a troop transport. After decommissioning by the U.S. Navy, the ship was turned over to the Army Transport Service and then to the U.S. Shipping Board. She was sold for scrapping in February 1924.

== History ==
=== SS Barbarossa ===
SS Barbarossa was built by Blohm & Voss, Hamburg, Germany, in 1896, for the North German Lloyd Line. She operated on both North Atlantic crossings and the Bremerhaven-Australia route.

With the outbreak of World War I, she took refuge in Hoboken, New Jersey, and was interned by the United States. She was seized when the United States entered the war 6 April 1917.

=== U.S. Navy transport ===
Damage inflicted by her crew prior to seizure was repaired and she was commissioned on 3 August 1917. Shortly after commissioning, she was renamed USS Mercury.

Mercury got underway for her first transatlantic troop-ferrying mission on 4 January 1918. Before the armistice, she had completed seven voyages to France, carrying over 18,000 passengers. After the armistice, she reversed the flow of troops, making eight crossings to return more than 20,000 to the United States.

== Postwar service ==
After completing her last crossing as a U.S. Navy ship on 19 September 1919, she decommissioned and on 27 September 1919 was turned over to the Army Transport Service for use as an Army transport. The Army in turn transferred her to the U.S. Shipping Board in August 1920. Mercury was chartered by the Baltic SS Corp of America for a proposed service between New York and Danzig, however the service never operated and the ship was returned to the Shipping Board in January 1921, when she was laid up. She was sold for scrapping in February 1924.
