= United States Shipping Board =

Emergency agency created by the 1916 Shipping Act

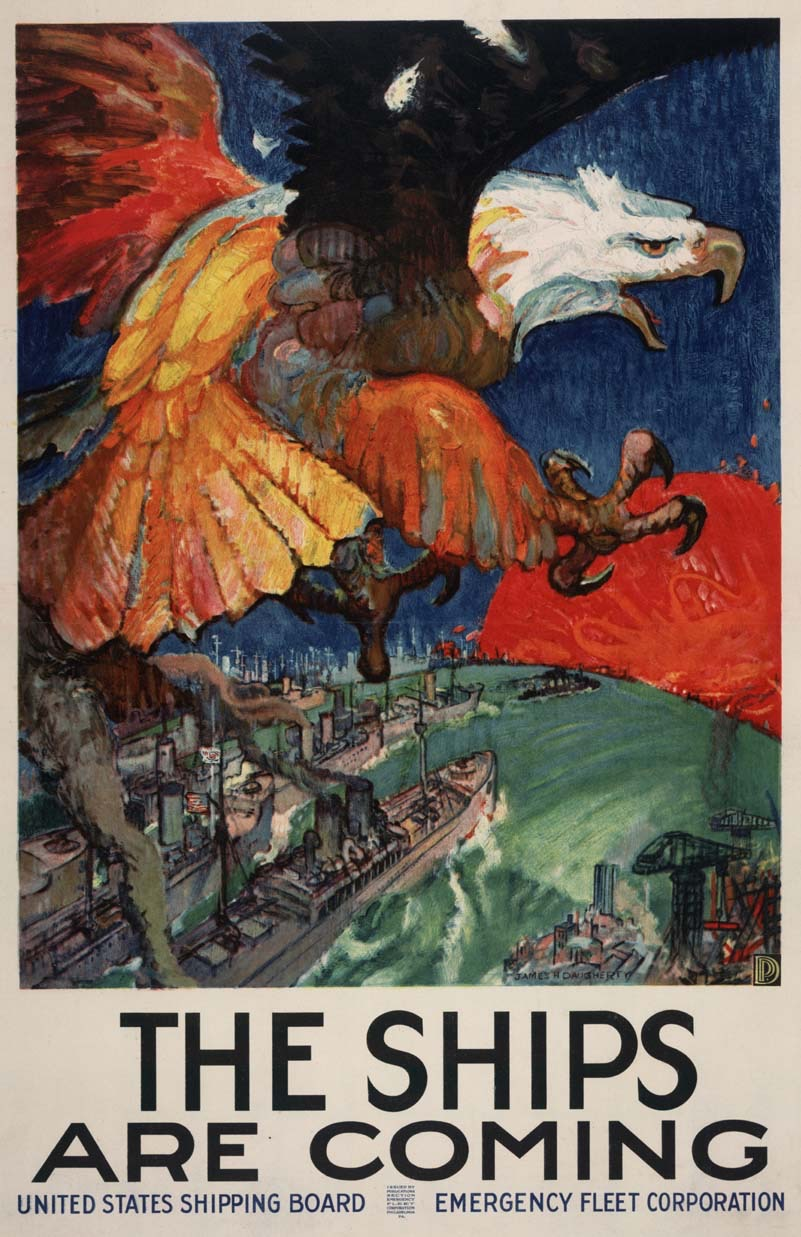
A World War I poster designed by James Daugherty for the US Shipping Board, ca. 1917–1918.

The United States Shipping Board (USSB) was a corporation established as an emergency agency by the 1916 Shipping Act (39 Stat. 729), on September 7, 1916. The United States Shipping Board's task was to increase the number of US ships supporting the World War I efforts. The program ended on March 2, 1934.

== Initiation ==
The United States had a maritime position that had been eroding for decades with some congressional concern. Some remedies actually worsened the situation since European shipping companies dominated overseas trade, and just over 10% of the value of trade carried in American-owned ships. The 1916 Act was the result of congressional efforts to create a board to address the problem dating from 1914. The legislation was not then a part of any war effort with specific intent, as stated in the act:

An Act to establish a United States Shipping Board for the purpose of encouraging, developing, and creating a naval auxiliary and naval reserve and a Merchant Marine to meet the requirements of the commerce of the United States with its territories and possessions and with foreign countries; to regulate carriers by water engaged in the foreign and interstate commerce of the United States for other purposes.

A board of five commissioners was to be appointed by the US president with confirmation by the US Senate as the United States Shipping Board (USSB) to acquire and construct suitable vessels and to create corporations under its control to execute the programs. In essence, the board was given "complete control over American ships and shipping."

US president Woodrow Wilson made public his nominations for the board on December 22, 1916, with some dissatisfaction in the shipping industry about particular nominees and the board's power to set ocean freight rates raising particular concern and skepticism. The initial nominees were:

- William Denman (chairman), who was instrumental in drafting the legislation for the establishment of the board for a term of six years.
- Bernard N. Baker for five years.
- John A. Donald for four years.
- James B. White for three years.
- Theodore Brent for a term of two years.

The members of the board gathered in Washington in the first week of January 1917 to plan and organize while they awaited confirmation, which came in late January. The board's formal organization was on January 30.

US vessels had suffered a disadvantage, and the laws passed by Congress had in some cases had the effect of giving advantage to European shipping, instead of the desired effect of making the country no longer heavily dependent on foreign shipping. With the outbreak of war in Europe, the national fleets of the warring countries became involved in those countries' wartime efforts and were withdrawn from commercial trade, which was vital to US commerce. One initial step was granting authority to the president to allow registration of foreign-built ships owned by US companies to enter the US registry and operate under the US flag and to repeal certain penalties for those using foreign-built vessels. The net effect was negligible as shipbuilding in the United States declined almost equally with the benefits gained.

The US entered the war just over two months after the board had begun its work, which completely changed its focus from generally strengthening the nation's maritime position to a massive wartime program. Though it was sometimes referred to as the War Shipping Board, the official title remained the United States Shipping Board.

The board was to address the shortage of shipping through acquisition of existing hulls and, with the declaration of war by the United States on Germany on 6 April 1917, a construction program through its Emergency Fleet Corporation (EFC) was created 16 April. The precedent for using such a corporation had been set during the construction of the Panama Canal during which the Panama Railway Company was charged with much of the construction and had its stock entirely owned by the US secretary of war. The Shipping Act had explicitly empowered the board to found such a company, which was done with issuance of $50,000,000 in stock all initially held by the board; the majority portion had to be retained, and another provision required the trustees of the EFC to hold stock. During the war, Congress granted the president extraordinary wartime powers, which were used by means of Executive Orders to expand the board's authority and its corporation. The board, as a regulatory and policy body, executed its programs largely through the EFC, a separate entity that was fully under the policy control of the majority stockholder, the board. The Chairman of the USSB was initially the head of the EFC, but the General Manager had all real authority except the power to sign contracts.

The division of authority between the USSB and the EFC and the construction program's direction led to conflict between USSB Chairman Denman and EFC General Manager Major-General George Washington Goethals. That resulted in the resignation of both men and the reconstitution of the board and the corporation.

The new USSB composition, which remained throughout the war was Edward N. Hurley as chairman, with Raymond B. Stevens replacing James B. White as vice-chairman and John Donald, Bainbridge Colby and Charles R. Page as members. Rear Admiral Washington L. Capps, formerly Constructor of the Navy and Chief of the Navy's Bureau of Construction, became the General Manager of the EFC.

== World War I ==
Shipbuilding before America entered the war had been expanded to some extent, with domestic shipping companies replacing ships withdrawn from trade by belligerents and both the United Kingdom and neutral countries contracting for ships in US yards. The UK had contracted for ships through private British companies for security and for US neutrality needs. In March 1917, just before the US entered the war and the USSB shifted to full wartime operations, there were about 700,000 tons of new construction underway for the private US owners, and all 234 building ways in the US were occupied by either those or by ships for neutral and domestic shipping lines. There was no possibility for a quick expansion of capacity to incorporate the USSB/EFC shipbuilding program.

=== Providing hulls ===
==== Interned enemy ships ====
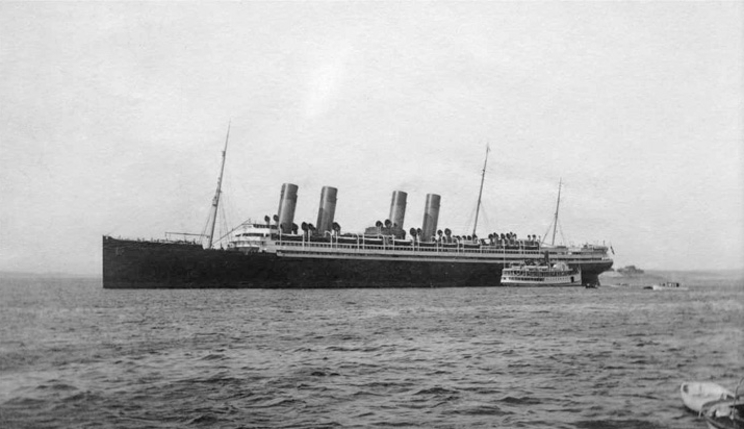
Kronprinzessin Cecilie at Bar Harbor, Maine

The most readily available hulls were 91 German vessels of 594,696 GRT aggregate tonnage refurbished for use by the USSB and under legislation of 12 May 1917 and an executive order of 30 June 1917 giving the USSB formal power to seize the vessels and enter them into the US registry. The report of December 1918 showed one Austrian steamer, 87 German steamers that now included four from Cuba, and seven sailing vessels seized. Some of Germany's premier liners, such as Amerika, George Washington, Kronprinzessin Cecilie, Astoria, Pensacola, Aeolus, Mercury, Pocahontas, Powhatan, Prinz Eitel Friedrich, Republic, President Lincoln, Kaiser Wilhelm II, Antigone, Rhein, Kronprinz Wilhelm, Covington, Friedrich der Große and Vaterland, were among the seized ships.

On 15 November 1917, the USSB authorized negotiations with foreign countries that had seized German or Austrian ships with actual discussions that continued until January 1918. The result was the charter or the outright purchase of a number of ships interned from South America to China.

==== Commandeering existing construction ====
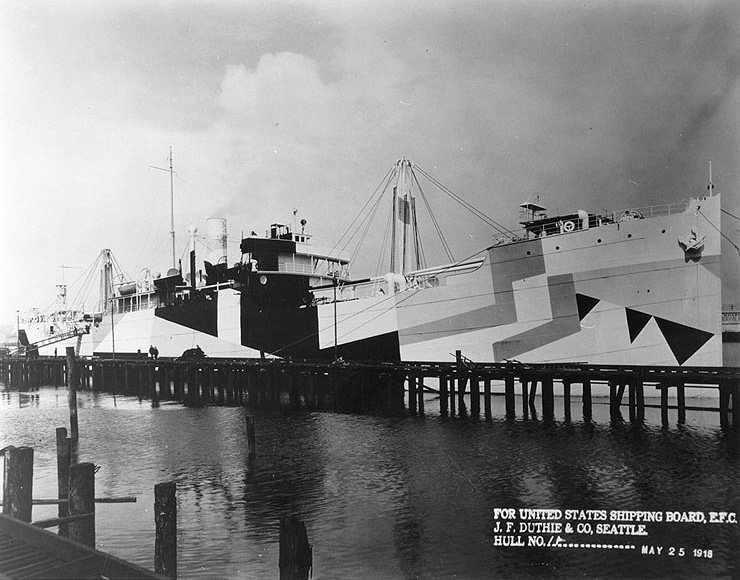
USS West Bridge, the commandeered British ship War Topaz

The USSB's first action regarding new construction was commandeering every contract, hull, and even steel in the US yards for ships over 2,500 DWT. The first order was signed by Chairman Hurley on 3 August 1917, to be executed by the EFC to secure control of the shipyards and construction already underway. The action was immediately protested by nearly every shipyard and owner of the ships under construction, with the foreign owners protesting through the US State Department. A large number of the contracts and ships under construction for foreign accounts were for the United Kingdom, and the protest was solved with the British government's agreement that the ships would be used in the total war effort. With one exception, a new ship from Union Iron Works that had already loaded for departure, War Sword, the contracts and the ships were requisitioned.

Out of 431 such ships, totaling 3,068,431 DWT, 414 of the requisitioned were completed after cancellations of some contracts for ships of unwanted design that were in early stages of construction or not yet laid down. A very large group of these ships, contracted with names prefixed with "War" and renamed before completion, were being built for the British Shipping Controller of Ministry of Shipping under various shipping line contracts. Examples of such ships are War Topaz, which became USS West Bridge, and one of the Great Lakes built ships, originally War Bayonet, which became USS Lake Superior for the first war and USS Tuluran for the second. Others among the ships found service in the next war; for example, War Dido was torpedoed and sunk as Empire Springbuck in 1941, and War Dragon was seized by Japan and sunk as Renzan Maru by USS Porpoise on 1 January 1943. Some being built for domestic shippers had long careers, with Orizaba and Oriente being examples.

==== Construction program ====
The Board's construction program, most notably the Hog Islander ships, was executed through the Emergency Fleet Corporation, which it established on 16 April 1917.

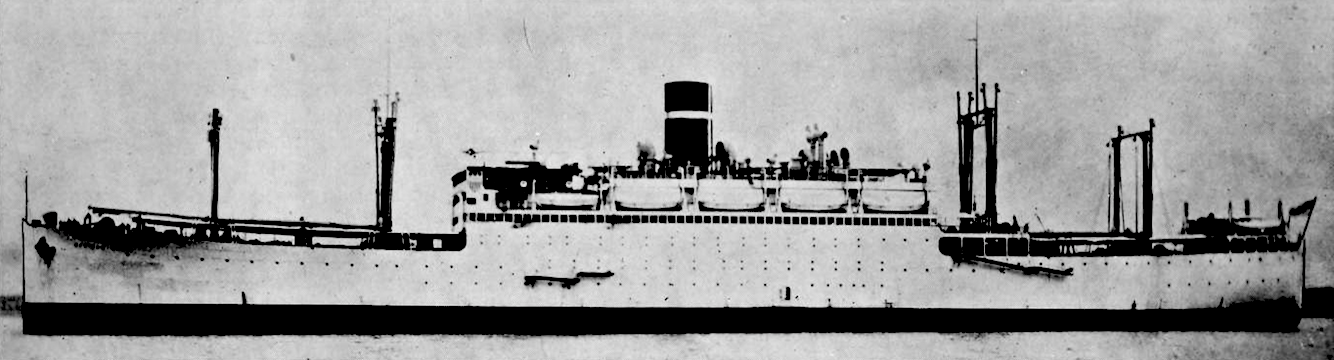
Western World in 1922

The shipbuilding program was concluded with the 9 May 1922 delivery of the ship completed and delivered as Western World, launched as Nutmeg State 17 September 1921, by Bethlehem Shipbuilding Corporation at Sparrows Point, Maryland.

=== Ship management ===
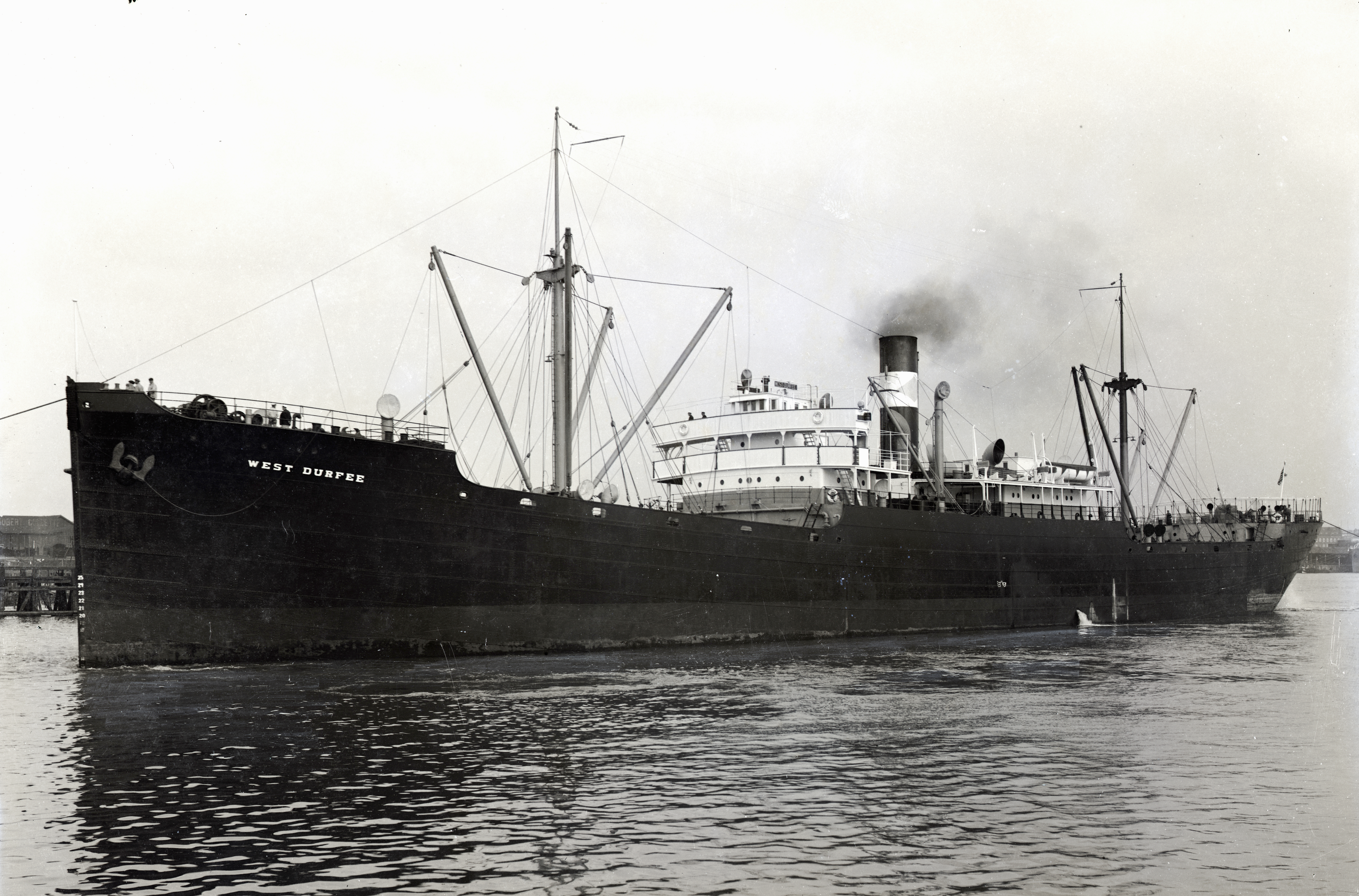
USS West Durfee built in 1918 at Skinner & Eddy

When ships were delivered from the builder to the USSB, they came under the management of the Division of Operations, which allocated them to the US War Department, US Navy Department, or commercial service, based on needs and the class and type of ship. By December 1918, the division had become the largest ship operating entity in US history, with a total fleet of 1,386 vessels totaling 7,498,075 DWT owned outright, managed, or chartered.

For more control of traffic required by the war effort, methods applied by the British were employed in which rates were adjusted and control was exercised through the division's Chartering Committee, whose approval was necessary to obtain license to refuel in US ports. With American-registered ships already under tight control, those regulations were largely directed at neutrals. A specific example was the preferred trade by neutrals in manganese with eastern South America when the war effort required nitrates from the west of the continent. The board's efforts were directed to shift the balance. Enforcement of rates was strict and at one point, before wide compliance, 136 steamers were held in US ports. By December 1918, the USSB directly controlled such a large portion of US shipping through ownership and charter that the USSB's prewar rate-setting regulatory function had largely become a minor factor.

A Maritime Intelligence Department in the division and a separate Division of Planning and Statistics collected and analyzed shipping data to help determine what level of shipping was necessary for commerce and how much could be shifted to the war effort.

=== Ship manning ===
As of 1 June 1917, the USSB established a recruiting service with headquarters in Boston, with the first of an eventual 43 training centers, in recognition that traditional methods were too slow for the rapid wartime expansion for deck officers, at Cambridge, Massachusetts on 4 June. A second set of schools was created for engineering officers with those engineers destined for turbine powered ships being sent to the builders of turbines for training. The early result, between 1 June 1917 and 1 October 1918 was 11,618 licensed officers. The officer training was expanded to training for crew, deck sailors, firemen, wipers, cooks, and stewards by December 1917 and was open to all male citizens of the ages 18 to 20 or 32 to 35 with a goal expanded from an estimated 85,000 to 200,000 because of the revised estimates of ships by the end of the war.

To ensure that labor problems did not disrupt necessary war shipping, the USSB employed special labor consultants and entered agreements with labor and other government agencies to resolve labor disputes directly and also to standardize wages across the industry. One of the USSB organizations that as specifically concerned with the issue was the Marine and Dock Industrial Relations Division, which was to coordinate all labor related matters, and by late 1918, industry and labor had begun referring disputes to the board and thus avoided any stoppages.

U.S. Shipping Board Enlisted Sailor Rates
Chief Petty Officer	Petty Officer 1st Class	Petty Officer 2nd Class	Petty Officer 3rd Class	Ordinary Sailor

=== National Adjustment Commission ===
The National Adjustment Commission was established in 1917 as an adjunct to the USSB for the adjustment and control of wages, hours, and conditions of labor in the loading and the unloading of vessels. In 1918, the initial operation and policies of the commission was agreed to between the USSB and the following parties:

- US Secretary of War
- US Secretary of Labor
- American Federation of Labor
- International Longshoremen's Association
- Major shipping companies on the Atlantic and the Gulf Coasts.

Subsequently, additional shipping companies and labor organizations entered the agreement with modifications. William Z. Ripley was chairman of the commission from 1919 to 1920.

In July 1920, the USSB withdrew from the commission agreement and decided to deal with shipping workers directly. The commission ceased operations on October 1, 1920.

== Postwar and abolishment ==
In 1921, the USSB was described as "probably the wealthiest corporation in the United States, and certainly by far the largest shipping organization in the world." At the time, it had approximately 1,500 sea-going vessels and employed approximately 60,000 seamen, as well as paid for the services of 75,000 workers in shipyards and 100,000 longshoremen.

The USSB operated a shipping business with its surplus ships until 1920, when the overseas freight market collapsed, and it began to lay up its vessels. In 1925, Henry Ford bought 199 of the out-of-service ships for $1,697,470 as part of an investigation into the secondary use of materials. The first ship reached the Ford River Rouge Complex in November, and all of the remaining ships were broken down and recycled the following summer.

The USSB was abolished effective March 2, 1934.

Its successor agencies have been:

- The US Shipping Board Bureau of the US Department of Commerce (1933–36).
- The US Maritime Commission (1936–50).
- The US Federal Maritime Board of the US Department of Commerce (regulatory functions only, 1950–61).
- The US Federal Maritime Commission (regulatory functions only, 1961–).
- The US Maritime Administration of the Department of Commerce (all other functions, 1950–81).
- The US Maritime Administration of the US Department of Transportation (all other functions, 1981–).

== U.S. Shipping Commissioners ==
- 1920–1921 Joseph Nathan Teal
- 1921 - 1923 Albert Lasker
- 1923 - Edward P. Farley

From 1924 to 1933, the board was instead chaired by T. V. O'Connor.

== See also ==
- United States Maritime Commission
- United States Maritime Administration

== Bibliography ==
- Hurley, Edward N. (1927). The Bridge to France. Philadelphia & London: J. B. Lippincott Company. LCCN 27011802.
- McKellar, Norman L. "Steel Shipbuilding under the U. S. Shipping Board, 1917-1921, Introduction" (PDF). Steel Shipbuilding under the U. S. Shipping Board, 1917–1921. ShipScribe.
- McKellar, Norman L. "Steel Shipbuilding under the U. S. Shipping Board, 1917–1921, Introduction". Steel Shipbuilding under the U. S. Shipping Board, 1917–1921, Requisitioned Steel Ships, Part I & Requisitioned Steel Ships, Part II. ShipScribe.
- National Archives: Records of the United States Shipping Board
- "The Shipping Board". Pacific Marine Review. 14 (February). San Francisco: J.S. Hines: 7273. 1917.
- United States Senate, 65th Congress, Committee on Commerce (1918). Hearings before the Committee on Commerce. Vol. 1. Washington: U.S. Government Printing Office.
- United States Shipping Board (December 3, 1917). First Annual Report of the United States Shipping Board. United States Shipping Board, Annual Reports. Vol. 1. Washington: U.S. Government Printing Office.
- United States Shipping Board (December 1, 1918). Second Annual Report of the United States Shipping Board. United States Shipping Board, Annual Reports. Vol. 2. Washington: U.S. Government Printing Office.
