= List of flags of Israel =

The following is a list of Israeli flags.

== National flags ==
Flag	Date	Use	Description
	1948–present	State flag and civil flag of Israel (see: Flag of Israel)	The design recalls the Tallit, the Jewish prayer shawl, which is white with blue stripes. The hexagram in the centre is the Magen David ("Shield of David", also known in the diaspora as the "Star of David"). Dimensions: 8:11
	1948–present	Civil ensign of Israel	Blue flag with a white vertically elongated oval set near the hoist containing a vertically elongated blue Magen David. Dimensions: 2:3

== Governmental flags ==
Flag	Date	Use	Description
	?–present	Presidential standard	A square, silver-bordered dark blue banner bearing the emblem of Israel: a menorah (seven-armed candlestick), olive branches, and the name "Israel" in Hebrew beneath. Dimensions: 7:8
	?–present	Presidential standard (at sea)	Presidential standard with the border in yellow.
	?–present	Prime minister's flag	A blue field with the national flag of Israel in the canton and the coat of arms charged in the fly.
	?–present	Prime minister's flag (at sea)	A dark blue field with the national flag of Israel in the canton and the coat of arms charged in the fly.
	?–present	Minister of Defence flag	A blue field with the national flag of Israel in the canton and the coat of arms surmounting a vertical sword wrapped in an olive branch, charged in the fly.
	?–present	Minister of Defence flag (at sea)	A dark blue field with the national flag of Israel in the canton and the coat of arms surmounting a vertical sword wrapped in an olive branch, charged in the fly.
	?–present	Minister of Environmental Protection flag	A white field with the Ministry of Environmental Protection logo
	?–present	Minister of Intelligence flag	A white, gray, and blue flag with the Ministry of Intelligence logo.
	?–present	Minister of Foreign Affairs flag	A white field with the Ministry of Foreign Affairs logo.
	?–present	Minister of Tourism flag	A white field with the Ministry of Tourism logo.

== Military and police flags ==
Flag	Date	Use	Description
	1949–present	Israel Defense Forces (Tsva ha-Hagana le-Yisra'el) flag	Light blue standard with the national flag in the canton and the IDF emblem in the lower fly. 8:11 ratio including the fringe.
	?–present	IDF Chief of Staff flag	A red field with the national flag of Israel in the canton and an emblem in the fly consisting of: erected sword wrapped in an olive branch, on one bent anchor, on two horizontal wings, surrounded by a garland of palms.
	?–present	IDF Chief of Staff flag (at sea)	A dark blue field with the national flag of Israel in the canton and an emblem in the fly consisting of: erected sword wrapped in an olive branch, on one bent anchor, on two horizontal wings, surrounded by a garland of palms.

=== Army flags ===
Flag	Date	Use	Description
	2022–present	Ground Forces flag	Five diagonal stripes: the upper hoist and lower fly are black, followed by narrow stripes of grey and a wide white stripe through the center. In the center of the white stripe is a black-outlined white-bordered black disk, containing an icosahedron inside of a reticle. Superimposed on the icosahedron is an upright sword wrapped in an olive branch.
	2016–2021	Ground Forces flag	Five diagonal stripes: from the upper fly, orange-red/white/green/black/orange-red. In the center of the green stripe is a black-outlined blue disk, containing a series of rings: white ending in two arrows, green, and orange-red, with a central orange disc. Superimposed over the rings is an upright black-outlined white sword wrapped in an olive branch, also in black-outlined white.
	1983–2016	Ground Forces flag	Five diagonal stripes: from the upper fly, orange-red/white/green/black/orange-red. In the center of the green stripe is a white-bordered gold disk, containing four semicircles of green, orange, black and orange-red. Superimposed over them is an upright black-outlined white sword wrapped in an olive branch, also in black-outlined white.
		IDF Central Command flag	
		IDF Northern Command flag	
		IDF Southern Command flag	
		IDF Home Front Command flag	
		IDF Operations Directorate flag	
		IDF Military Intelligence Directorate flag	
		IDF Planning Directorate flag	
		IDF Computer Service Directorate flag	
		IDF Technological and Logistics Directorate flag	
		IDF Manpower Directorate flag	
		Israeli Armored Corps (Kheyl HaShiryon) flag	Diagonally divided—black (upper fly) and green (lower hoist).
		Israeli Intelligence Corps ('Aman') flag	Diagonally divided—white (upper fly) and green (lower hoist).
		Military Police Corps (Kheyl HaMishtara HaTzva'it) flag	Diagonally divided—blue (upper fly) and red (lower hoist).
		Logistics Corps flag	Diagonally divided—blue (upper fly) and yellow (lower hoist).
		Israeli Infantry Corps ('Khir') flag	Diagonally divided—green (upper fly) and yellow (lower hoist).
		Military Rabbinate (Kheyl HaRabanut HaTzva'it) flag	Diagonally divided—grey (upper fly) and yellow (lower hoist).
		Technology and Maintenance Corps (Kheyl HaTekhnologya VeHaAkhzaka) flag	Diagonally divided—red (upper fly) and yellow (lower hoist).
		Medical Corps (Kheyl HaRfu'a) flag	Diagonally divided—red (upper fly) and white (lower hoist).
		Education and Youth Corps (Kheyl HaKhinukh VeHaNo'ar) flag	Diagonally divided—green (upper fly) and blue (lower hoist).
		Adjutant Corps flag	Diagonally divided—white (upper fly) and blue (lower hoist).
		C4I Corps (Kheyl HaTikshuv) flag	
		Israeli Artillery Corps (Kheyl HaTotkhanim) flag	Diagonally divided—red (upper fly) and black (lower hoist).
		Israeli Combat Engineering Corps (Kheyl HaHandasa HaKravit) flag	Diagonally divided—orange (upper fly) and black (lower hoist).
	1992–?	Home Front Command (Pikud Ha-ʿOref) flag	Diagonally divided—blue (upper fly) and orange (lower hoist). The colours of the homefront command are the same to those appearing in its emblem. Replaced and no longer in use.
	?–present	Israeli Combat Intelligence Collection Corps flag	Diagonally divided—white (upper fly) and yellow (lower hoist).
	?–present	Givati Brigade flag	Diagonally divided—white (upper fly) and purple (lower hoist).
	?–present	Golani Brigade flag	Diagonally divided—yellow (upper fly) and green (lower hoist).
	?–present	Nahal Brigade flag	Diagonally divided—white (upper fly) and green (lower hoist).
	?–present	Kfir Brigade flag	Diagonally divided—white (upper fly) and a camouflage pattern (lower hoist).
	?–present	Paratroopers Brigade flag	Diagonally divided—white (upper fly) and red (lower hoist).
	?–1992	Flag of the Israeli Civil Defense Corps	Diagonally divided—green (upper fly) and red (lower hoist).
	?–2001	Flag of the Israeli Women's Corps	Diagonally divided—brown (upper fly) and orange (lower hoist).

=== Navy flags ===
Flag	Date	Use	Description
	1948–present	Naval ensign	A blue ensign with a white triangle at hoist bearing a blue Magen David in it. Proportions are 2:3.
	?–present	Naval jack	The flag of Israel
	?–present	Commissioning pennant	
	?–present	Flag of the Commander in Chief at sea	
	?–present	Senior Officer's pennant	

=== Air Force flags ===
Flag	Date	Use	Description
	1991–present	Israeli Air Force flag	Light blue flag with thin stripes, near top and bottom (closer to the edges than on the national flag), white with dark blue borders. In the center, the air force roundel but with points touching disc edges and a dark blue border.
	?–present	Israeli Air Defense Command flag	Diagonally divided—blue (upper fly) and black (lower hoist).

=== Police flags ===
Flag	Date	Use	Description
	?–present	Israel Police (Mishteret Yisra'el) flag	A blue field with the Police badge charged in the centre.
	?–present	Israel Police General Commissioner flag	A blue field with the national flag of Israel in the canton and the Police badge charged in the fly.
	?–present	Israel Border Police – 'MAGAV' (Mishmar HaGvul) flag	A green field with the Police badge in the canton and the Magav badge charged in the fly.

=== Knesset Guard flag ===
Flag	Date	Use	Description
	2007–present	Flag of the Knesset Guard	A white field with the Knesset Guard logo charged in the center.
	1958–2007	Flag of the Knesset Guard	

=== Intelligence flags ===
Flag	Date	Use	Description
	?–present	Institute for Intelligence and Special Operations – 'Mossad' (haMosad leModiʿin uleTafkidim Meyukḥadim – haMosad) flag	A white field with the Mossad logo charged in the center.

=== Prison Service ===
Flag	Date	Use	Description
	?–present	Israel Prison Service flag	A blue field with the Prison Service badge charged in the centre.
	?–present	Commander of the Israel Prison Service flag	A blue field with the national flag of Israel in the canton and the Prison Service badge charged in the fly.

=== Israel Fire and Rescue Services ===
Flag	Date	Use	Description
	?–present	Israel Fire and Rescue Services flag	
	?–present	Flag of Israel Fire and Rescue Services Chief of Staff	

== Municipal flags ==
Flag	Date	Use	Description
	1949–present	Flag of Tel Aviv-Yafo	Based on the national flag.
	1958–present	Flag of Ramat Gan	A blue background with the city's emblem (which was adopted in 1958) in the center. The emblem consists of a shield with a charged green field in the shape of a rounded hexagonal star, reminiscent of a Star of David, and is surrounded by seven small white hexagonal stars. Inside the big star is a landscape illustration showing a sun shining and illuminating the symbol. In the center of the star is a palm tree, below it a pan with a cluster of grapes and citrus fruits and plowshares appear across the symbol. In the lower right part of the star is a stone wall and three trees growing from it. On the left side of the star is an industrial building with a chimney. At the bottom of the emblem is a ribbon with the name of the city, "Ramat Gan".
		Flag of Givatayim	
	1958–present	Flag of Petah Tikva	A navy blue field with the city's emblem. The emblem was first created in c. 1908. The emblem is shaped as a stylized Magen David. The plough immortalizes the first plowing as a symbol to the fact that with founding Petah Tikva, the agriculture work was renewed. The green fields symbolizes of drying of the Yarkon swamps and turning them into green fields. The orange tree since the first tree was planted by Rabbi Fromkin in Lakhman estate, this important branch was developed and Petah Tikva became the biggest producer of citrus in Israel.
		Flag of Jerusalem	Based on the national flag, the flag of Jerusalem features in the center the city's coat of arms, which consists of a shield with the Lion of Judah superimposed on a stylized background representing the Kotel, flanked on either side with olive branches. The word יְרוּשָׁלַיִם (Yerushalayim, Hebrew for "Jerusalem") appears above the shield.
	1951–present	Flag of Ashkelon	An orange field with the city's emblem (which was adopted in 1951 and approved by the Israeli government in 1959) in the center. The emblem consists of a shield with a light blue field representing the sea and sky of Ashkelon. The five red stars represent the city's five neighborhoods, alongside a marble column with a title, and a gear, representing Ashkelon's industrial plants with waves below the gear representing Ashkelon's spectacular beaches. The film symbolises the "planning of Ashkelon as Israel's film city".
	2023–present	Flag of Ashdod	A white field with Ashdod's city-emblem (adopted alongside the flag) in the center. The colors in the sails symbolize that Ashdod is a modern and dynamic city. The blue represents the Mediterranean Sea, the green represents the self-sustainability of Ashdod, and the orange represents the energy and warmth that characterize the city's residents. The lion's head represents the tribe of Judah that resided in the area of modern-day Ashdod. the color of the lion represents the dunes and sands from which the city of Ashdod (previously Isdud) was established on. On the bottom the city's name both in Hebrew and English is present, with Ashdod's old city emblem the Sails Square. Adopted in 2023 as part of the Ashdod flag competition to replace the old flag. The flag was designed by Shmuel Yehuda Oish of the "Kivan" branding agency in Ashdod.
	1953 (designed)	Flag of Qiryat Gat	
	?–present	Flag of Haifa	A blue field with the emblem charged in the center.
	?–present	Flag of Holon	Based on the national flag with the colors reversed and the city's emblem in lieu of the Star of David. The emblem may also appear in a white rectangular box, or drawn in white on the blue background.
	?–present	Flag of Rishon LeZion	An orange field with the city emblem charged in the center.
	?–present	Flag of Netanya	An orange field with the city emblem charged in the center.
	?–present	Flag of Bat Yam	
	?–present	Flag of Herzliya	Based on the national flag.
	?–present	Flag of Bnei Brak	
	?–present	Flag of Ramat HaSharon	An orange field with the city emblem charged in the center.
	?–present	Flag of Or Yehuda	
	?–present	Flag of Kfar Saba	
	?–present	Flag of Modi'in	
	?–present	Flag of Kfar Kama	Cyrillic script is present on the flag to represent the town's Circassian history.
	?–present	Flag of Karmiel	Based on the national flag.
		Flag of the Har Hebron Regional Council	
	–2005	Flag of Hof Azza	In use prior to the Israeli disengagement from the Gaza Strip.

== Organization flags ==
Flag	Date	Use	Description
	?–present	Israel Railways flag	A blue field with the Rakevet Yisra'el logo charged in the centre.
	?–present	Israel Nature and Parks Authority flag	
	?–present	Israel Postal Authority flag	
	?–present	Israel Mail pennant	
	?–present	Magen David Adom flag	
	?–present	Flag of the Israel Antiquities Authority	
	1965–2004	Flag of Customs services of Israel	

== Historical flags ==
Flag	Date	Use
	1458 BCE – 1200 BCE	Standards of Ancient Egypt
	539 BCE – 332 BCE	Standard of Cyrus the Great
	63 BCE – 395	Vexilloid of the Roman Empire
	c. 395–614; 628–636	Reconstruction of the Labarum of Constantine the Great
	614–628	Flag of the Sassanid Empire
	660–750	Flag of the Umayyad Caliphate
	750–969	Flag of the Abbasid Caliphate
	1099–1291	Flag of the Kingdom of Jerusalem
	c. 1174–1260	Reconstruction of Saladin's personal standard
	1260–1516	Flag of the Mamluk Sultanate
	1260–1516	Flag of the Mamluk Sultanate (variant)
	1516–1793	Flag of the Ottoman Empire
	1793–1831; 1840–1844	Flag of the Ottoman Empire
	1831–1840	Flag of the self-declared Khedivate of Egypt introduced by Muhammad Ali
	1844–1918	Flag of the Ottoman Empire
	1897–1898	Flag of the First and Second Zionist Congress
	1918–1948	Flag of the United Kingdom
	1919–1921	Flag of the First Judeans Regiment of the Jewish Legion
	1920–1948	Flag of the High Commissioner of Palestine
	1924–1926	House flag of the American Palestine Line
	1927–1948	Palestine Maritime ensign
	1929–1948	Customs and Postal Banner of Palestine
	1933–1934	MV "Emanuel" (Captain Arye "Lyova" Grevnov) ship's of "Hofiya Shipping Company" Hebrew flag
	1942–1944	Flag of the Jewish Combat Organization
	1942–1944	Flag of the Jewish Military Union
	1944–1946	Flag of the Jewish Brigade
	1948	The Ink Flag

=== National flag proposals ===
Theodor Herzl's proposal (1890s)

Ha'Degel proposal 1 (1948)

Ha'Degel proposal 2 (1948)

Ha'Degel proposal 3 (1948)

Ha'Degel proposal 4 (1948)

Ha'Degel proposal 5 (1948)

Ha'Degel proposal 6 (1948)

Ha'Degel proposal 7 (1948)

Ha'Degel proposal 8 (1948)

Contest proposal 44 (1948)

Contest proposal 57 (1948)

Contest proposal 58 (1948)

Contest proposal 61 (1948)

Otta Wallish's proposal (1949)

Nissim Sabah's proposal (1949)

== Lifeguard flags ==
Flag	Date	Use	Description
	1970–present	Calm sea: bathing and swimming is allowed	A white field
	1970–present	Stormy sea: bathing and swimming is allowed	A red field
	1970–present	Very stormy sea: bathing and swimming is forbidden	A black field
	1970–present	Presence of jellyfish at sea: bathing and swimming is forbidden	A purple triangular pennon with a white jellyfish

== Minority flags ==
Flag	Date	Use	Description
	1964–present	Flag of the Israeli Palestinian Arab Minority	The flag of Palestine. Used by Palestinians within the Green Line. Red triangle at the hoist side, and three horizontal stripes of black-white-green.
	?–present	Flag of the Israeli Druze Minority	Used by Israeli Druze. Green triangle at the hoist side, and four horizontal stripes of red-yellow-blue-white.

== See also ==
- Emblem of Israel
- Flag of Israel
- List of Palestinian flags
