= USS Princess Matoika =

United States Navy transport ship

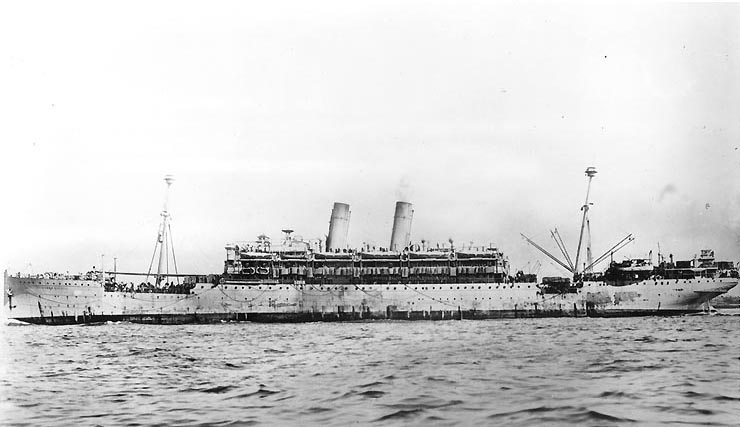
- USS Princess Matoika (ID-2290) under way in 1919

History

German Empire
- Name: 1900: SS Kiautschou; 1904: SS Princess Alice
- Namesake: 1900: Kiautschou, German colony in China; 1904: One or all of (see text): Princess Alice, daughter of Queen Victoria; Princess Alice of Albany, granddaughter of Queen Victoria; Alice Roosevelt, daughter of Theodore Roosevelt nicknamed "Princess Alice"; Pocahontas nicknamed "Matoika"
- Owner: 1900: HAPAG; 1904: North German Lloyd (NDL)
- Port of registry: 1900: Hamburg; 1904: Bremen
- Route: 1900: Hamburg–Far East; 1904: Bremen–New York; 1905–05: Bremen–Suez Canal–Far East; 1905–10: Bremen–Cherbourg–New York; 1910–1914: Bremen–Suez Canal–Far East
- Builder: AG Vulcan Stettin, Stettin, Germany; (present-day Szczecin, Poland)
- Launched: 14 September 1900
- Maiden voyage: Hamburg–Far East, 25 December 1900
- Fate: Interned at Cebu, Philippines, 1914; seized by United States, April 1917

United States
- Name: 1918: USS Princess Matoika (ID-2290); 1919: USAT Princess Matoika
- Namesake: Princess Matoika (variant spelling of given name of Pocahontas)
- Owner: 1918: United States Navy; 1919: War Department
- Operator: 1918: U.S. Navy; 1919: U.S. Army
- Acquired: seized by United States, April 1917
- In service: 19 September 1919
- Out of service: After September 1920
- Fate: Transferred to United States Shipping Board

United States
- Name: 1921: SS Princess Matoika; 1922: SS President Arthur; 1926: SS City of Honolulu
- Namesake: 1922: Chester A. Arthur, 21st U.S. President; 1926: City of Honolulu
- Owner: 1921: United States Shipping Board; 1924: American Palestine Line; 1926: Los Angeles Steamship Company (LASSCO)
- Operator: January 1921: United States Mail Steamship Line; August 1921: United States Lines; 1924: American Palestine Line; 1926: Los Angeles Steamship Company
- Route: January 1921: New York–Naples–Genoa; May 1921: New York–Bremen; 1923: (laid up); 1925: New York–Naples–Haifa; 1927: Los Angeles–Hawaii; 1930: (laid up)
- Fate: Burned, 1930; sold for scrap, 1934

General characteristics
- Class & type: Barbarossa-class ocean liner
- Tonnage: As built: 10,911 GRT; 1921: 10,421 GRT; 1926: 10,680 GRT
- Displacement: 20,500 t
- Length: 1900: 159.55 m (523 ft 5 in); 1904: 166.10 m (544 ft 11 in)
- Beam: 18.32 m (60 ft 1 in) 1918: 61 ft (19 m)
- Draft: 1918: 29 ft 6 in (8.99 m)
- Propulsion: Twin screws; 2 quadruple-expansion steam engines
- Speed: 1900: 15 knots (28 km/h); 1904: 15.5 knots (28.7 km/h); 1918: 16 knots (30 km/h); 1925: 19.7 knots (36.5 km/h), maximum; 1926: 16 knots (30 km/h)
- Capacity: Passengers (as built): 327 first class; 103 second class; 80 third class; 1,700 steerage; 1904: 255 first class; 115 second class; 1,666 steerage; 1921: 350 cabin class; 500 third class; 1925: 675 passengers; 1927: 450 first class; 50 third class; Cargo: 4,000 short tons (3,600 t)
- Troops: 1918: 3,500; 3,900 after Armistice
- Complement: 1918: 449
- Crew: 1904: 207–248; 1921: 260
- Armament: 1918: 4 × 6-inch (150 mm) guns

USS Princess Matoika (ID-2290) was a transport ship for the United States Navy during World War I. Before the war, she was a Barbarossa-class ocean liner that sailed as SS Kiautschou for the Hamburg America Line and as SS Princess Alice (sometimes spelled Prinzess Alice) for North German Lloyd. After the war she served as the United States Army transport ship USAT Princess Matoika. In post-war civilian service she was SS Princess Matoika until 1922, SS President Arthur until 1927, and SS City of Honolulu until she was scrapped in 1933.

Built in 1900 for the German Far East mail routes, SS Kiautschou traveled between Hamburg and Far East ports for most of her Hamburg America Line career. In 1904, she was traded to competitor North German Lloyd for five freighters, and renamed SS Princess Alice. She sailed both transatlantic and Far East mail routes until the outbreak of World War I, when she was interned in the neutral port of Cebu in the Philippines. Seized by the U.S. in 1917, the newly renamed USS Princess Matoika carried thousands of U.S. troops to and from France in U.S. Navy service from 1918 to 1919. As an Army transport after that, she continued to return troops and repatriated the remains of Americans killed overseas in the war. In July 1920 she was a last-minute substitute to carry a large portion of the United States team to the 1920 Summer Olympics in Antwerp. From the perspective of the Olympic team, the trip was disastrous and a majority of the team members published a list of grievances and demands of the American Olympic Committee in an action known today as the Mutiny of the Matoika.

After her Army career ended, Princess Matoika was transferred to the United States Mail Steamship Line for European passenger service in early 1921. After that company's financial troubles resulted in her seizure, Princess Matoika was assigned to the newly formed United States Lines and resumed passenger service. In 1922 the ship was renamed SS President Arthur, in honor of the 21st U.S. President, Chester A. Arthur. When changes in U.S. laws severely curtailed the number of immigrants that could enter the country in the early 1920s, the ship was laid up in Baltimore in late 1923.

President Arthur was purchased in October 1924 by the Jewish-owned American Palestine Line to begin regular service between New York, Naples, and Palestine. On her maiden voyage to Palestine she reportedly became the first ocean liner to fly the Zionist flag at sea and the first ocean liner ever to have female officers. Financial difficulties for American Palestine ended the service after three roundtrips, and the liner was sold to the Los Angeles Steamship Company for Los Angeles–Honolulu service. Following three years of carrying tourists and freight, the liner burned in Honolulu Harbor in 1930. She was deemed too expensive to repair and was eventually scrapped in Japan in 1933.

== Hamburg America Line ==
In March 1900 the Hamburg America Line (German: Hamburg-Amerikanische Packetfahrt-Aktien-Gesellschaft or HAPAG) announced the plans for 22 new ships totaling 150,000 gross register tons (GRT) at a cost of $11 million. One of the two largest ships announced was SS Kiautschou at an announced 10,200 GRT. The ship was laid down at AG Vulcan Stettin in Stettin, Germany (present-day Szczecin, Poland). During her construction, HAPAG renamed the ship twice before finally settling on Kiautschou, the German colony in China, as her namesake. Built, along with sister ship Hamburg, for HAPAG's entry into the Deutsche Reichspost's Far East routes, Kiautschou was launched on 14 September 1900, and sailed on her maiden voyage from Hamburg to the Far East on 22 December 1900.

The ship was 525 feet (160 m) long and featured twin screws powered by two quadruple expansion steam engines that generated 9,000 horsepower (6,700 kW). The liner also featured bilge keels that helped stabilize her ride. Kiautschou's first-class staterooms were described as "light and large" and located in the center of the ship. She had two large promenade decks, a music room, and a library. Her smoking room was at the rear of the upper promenade deck, and her large dining room featured a balcony where the ship's orchestra could serenade diners.

Kiautschou sailed on the Hamburg–Far East route until May 1902. For one round trip that month, Kiautschou replaced fellow HAPAG steamer Deutschland on Hamburg–New York service, calling at Southampton and Cherbourg on her eastbound trip, and at Cherbourg and Plymouth on her westbound return. After this one transatlantic excursion, Kiautschou was returned to Hamburg–Far East service. On 20 February 1904, in exchange for abandoning the mail routes shared with North German Lloyd, HAPAG traded Kiautschou for Lloyd freighters Bamberg, Königsberg, Nürnberg, Stolberg, and Strassburg.

== North German Lloyd ==
North German Lloyd renamed the newly acquired ship Princess Alice, though the German spelling Prinzess Alice was widely used in contemporary press coverage and, often, by the Lloyd themselves. There is some confusion as to who exactly was the namesake of the ship. Edwin Drechsel, in his two-volume work Norddeutscher Lloyd, Bremen, 1857–1970, reports that the ship was named equally for Princess Alice of Albany and Alice Roosevelt. Princess Alice of Albany was a granddaughter of Queen Victoria of the United Kingdom, and the new bride of Prince Alexander of Teck in Württemberg. Alice Roosevelt, daughter of the then-current U.S. President Theodore Roosevelt, was nicknamed "Princess Alice" by the press, and had launched the racing yacht of Kaiser Wilhelm II, Meteor, at Staten Island two years before. William Lowell Putnam gives the namesake as Princess Alice of the United Kingdom, the daughter of Queen Victoria.

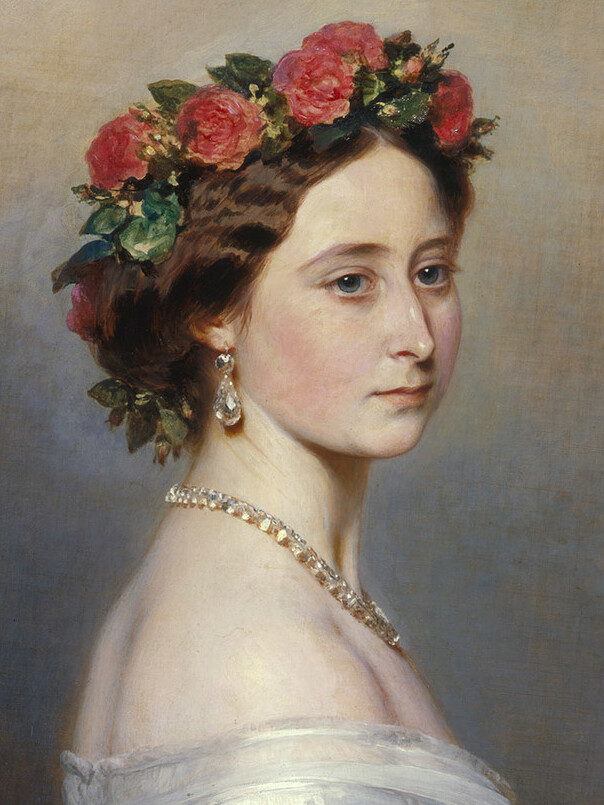
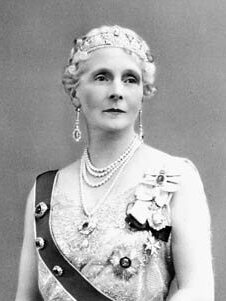
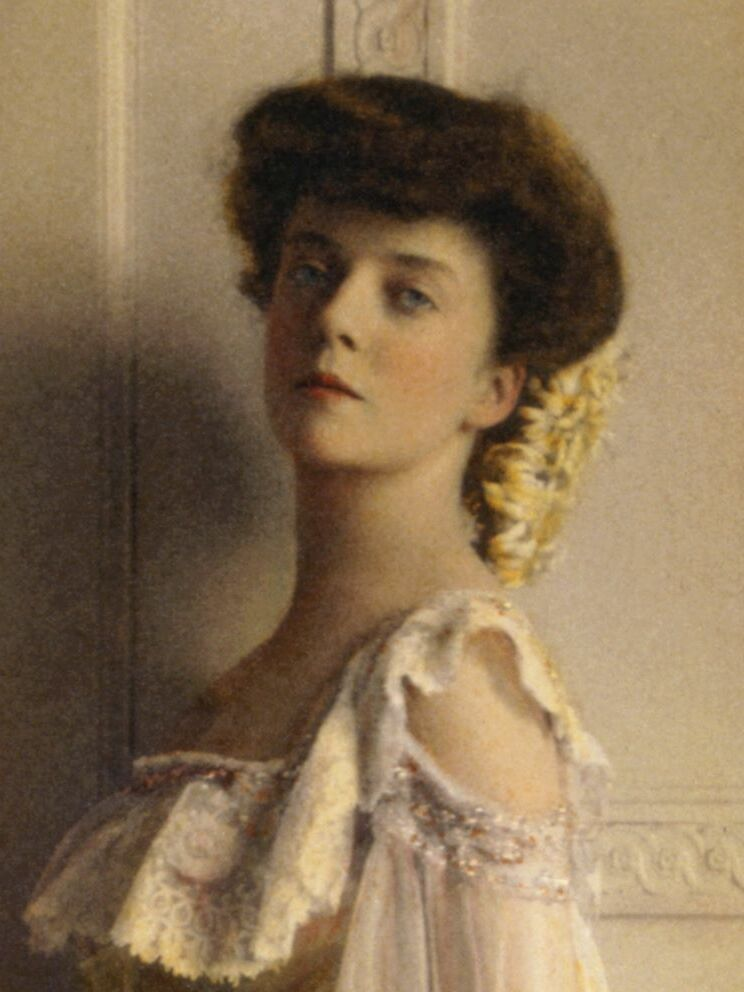
SS Princess Alice was named for one or more of these (from left): Princess Alice of the United Kingdom, Princess Alice of Albany, "Princess" Alice Roosevelt.

Princess Alice departed her new homeport of Bremen on 22 March 1904 for her maiden voyage under her new owners. After arriving in New York draped in flags and bunting, her dining room was the site of a press luncheon thrown by Lloyd staff celebrating her first arrival in that city. Princess Alice made four more roundtrips through early August, then shifted to Bremen–Suez Canal–Far East service, making her first Lloyd voyage on that route 31 August. Princess Alice would continue this pattern—sailing the North Atlantic during the heaviest-trafficked season and shifting to the Far East runs for the balance of the year—through 1910.

Throughout the rest of her Lloyd North Atlantic career she carried some notable passengers to and from Europe. In May 1905, for example, noted Baltimore gynecologist Howard Atwood Kelly, one of the co-founders of Johns Hopkins Hospital, sailed from New York; author Hamilton Wright Mabie and his wife sailed from New York the following month. American botanist Charles Frederick Millspaugh returned to New York aboard the German liner in June 1906, and retired U.S. Navy Rear admiral Alfred Thayer Mahan did the same in June 1907. Senator Augustus O. Bacon (D-GA), sailed for Europe on 1 August 1908.

Prompted by the successful use of wireless in saving lives during the sinking of RMS Republic in January 1909, and by proposed U.S. legislation (later passed as the Wireless Ship Act of 1910) requiring wireless for ships calling at U.S. ports, Princess Alice received her first wireless set in February 1909. Operating with call letters "DKZ" on the 300 m band, her radio had a 250-mile (400 km) range.

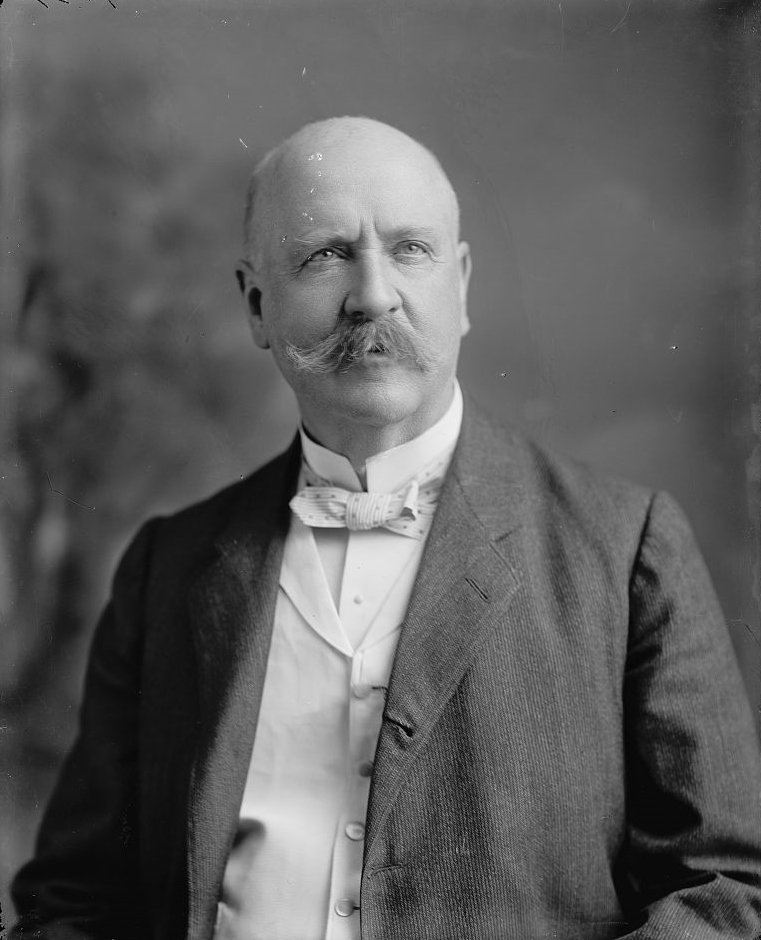
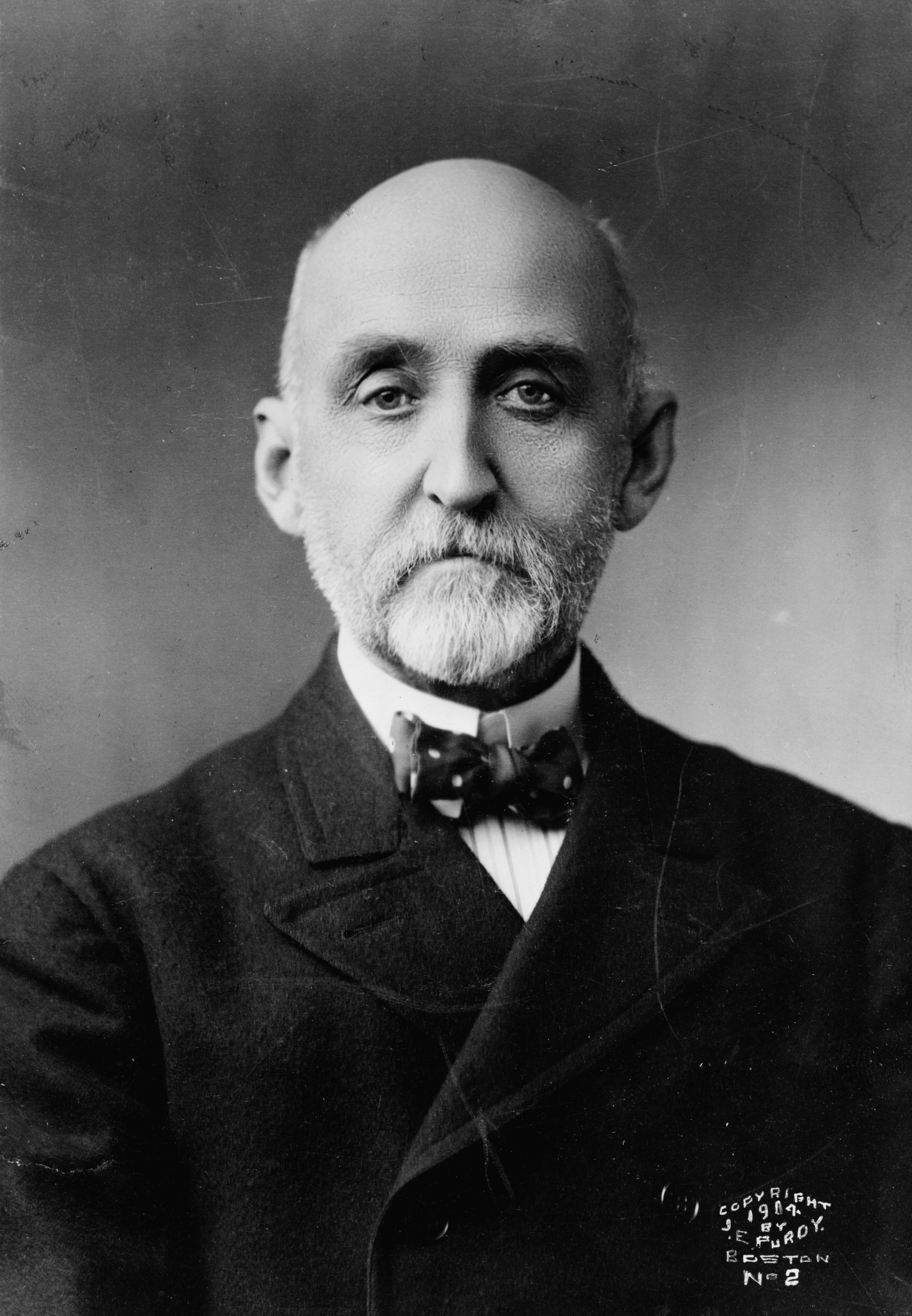
Senator A. O. Bacon, left, and retired Rear Admiral A. T. Mahan sailed on Princess Alice in the 1900s.

At 10:00 on 27 May 1909, loaded with more than a thousand passengers headed for Europe, Princess Alice departed the Lloyd pier in Hoboken, New Jersey. As she neared The Narrows in a heavy fog, she steamed to stay clear of outbound French Line steamer La Bretagne and ran hard aground on a submerged rocky ledge near the seawall of Fort Wadsworth a few minutes after 11:00. After the fog lifted, it was revealed that the bow of Princess Alice had stopped some 5 feet (1.5 m) from the outer walls of the Staten Island fort. Lighthouse tender Larkspur was the first ship to come to the aid of the Princess, followed by U.S. Army Quartermaster's ship General Meigs and revenue cutter Seneca. No passengers were hurt in the incident and it was determined there was no damage to the hull of the liner. But, despite the effort of attending ships, she remained stuck on the ledge. Eventually, after offloading 500 short tons (450 t) of cargo from her front hold onto lighters called to the scene, ten steam tugs and power from Princess Alice's own engines freed the ship at 01:47 on 28 May, almost fifteen hours after running aground. The force required to free the liner was great enough that she was then propelled into SS Marken, at anchor some distance away, damaging one of that ship's fenders. After then making her way to the nearby New York City Quarantine Station, Princess Alice anchored to reload her cargo, and by 09:05, she was underway again. However, she ran aground again in soft mud in Ambrose Channel at 10:15. This time she was able to free herself and proceeded on to Bremen, a little more than 24 hours late. This voyage was further marred by the apparent suicide of a despondent New York attorney on 30 May. The man, headed to the spa town of Bad Nauheim in Hesse, had previously suffered a nervous breakdown and was under the care of a doctor on board the ship at the time he jumped overboard.

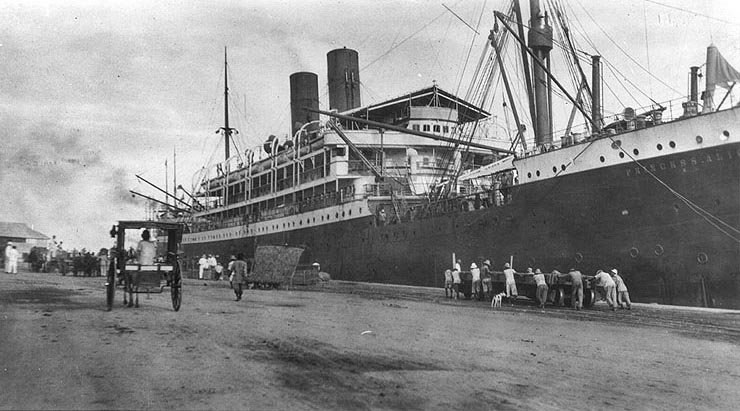
SS Princess Alice is pictured during her internment at Cebu, Philippines, c. 1914–1916.

In May 1910 Princess Alice sailed her last North Atlantic passage for her German owners. Put permanently on the Far East route, she plied Pacific waters for North German Lloyd until the outbreak of World War I. In late July 1914, as war spread across Europe, Princess Alice neared her destination of Hong Kong with £850,000 of gold from India. Rather than face seizure of the ship and her cargo by British authorities there, Princess Alice instead sped to the Philippines and deposited the gold with the German Consul at Manila. Leaving the neutral port in under 24 hours, the ship then rendezvoused with German cruiser Emden at Angaur before returning to the Philippines in early August and putting in at Cebu where she was interned.

== USS Princess Matoika ==
On 6 April 1917 the United States declared war and immediately seized interned German ships at U.S. and territorial ports, but unlike most other German ships interned by the United States, Princess Alice had not been sabotaged by her German crew before her seizure. Assigned the Identification Number of 2290, she was soon renamed Princess Matoika. Sources disagree about the identity of the ship's namesake, who is often reported as either a member of the Philippine Royal Family, or a Japanese princess. Putnam, however, provides another answer: one of the given names of Pocahontas was Matoaka, which was sometimes spelled Matoika. The newly renamed ship was taken to Olongapo City, 60 miles (97 km) north of Manila and placed in the drydock Dewey at Subic Bay where temporary repairs were made. She then made her way to San Francisco, and eventually to the east coast. Princess Matoika was the last ex-German ship to be commissioned.

=== Transporting troops to France ===
Placed under the command of William D. Leahy in April 1918, the ship was readied for her first transatlantic troop run. At Newport News, Virginia, elements of the 4th Infantry Division boarded on 9 May. Sailing at 18:30 the next day, Princess Matoika was accompanied by American transports Pastores, Wilhelmina, Lenape, Antigone, and Susquehanna, the British steamer Kursk, and the Italian Duca d'Aosta. The group rendezvoused with a similar group that left New York the same day, consisting of President Lincoln, Covington, Rijndam, British troopship Dwinsk, and Italian steamers Caserta and Dante Alighieri. American cruiser Frederick served as escort for the assembled ships, which were the 35th U.S. convoy of the war. During the voyage—because of the inability to finish serving three meals for all the men during daylight hours—mess service was curtailed to two daily meals, a practice continued on later voyages. On 20 May the convoy sighted and fired on a "submarine" that turned out to be a bucket; the next day escort Frederick left the convoy after being relieved by nine destroyers. Three days later the convoy sighted land at 06:30 and anchored at Brest that afternoon. Princess Matoika sailed for Newport News and arrived there safely on 6 June with Pastores and Lenape. Fate, however, was not as kind to former convoy mates President Lincoln and Dwinsk. On their return journeys they were sunk by German submarines U-90 and U-151, respectively.

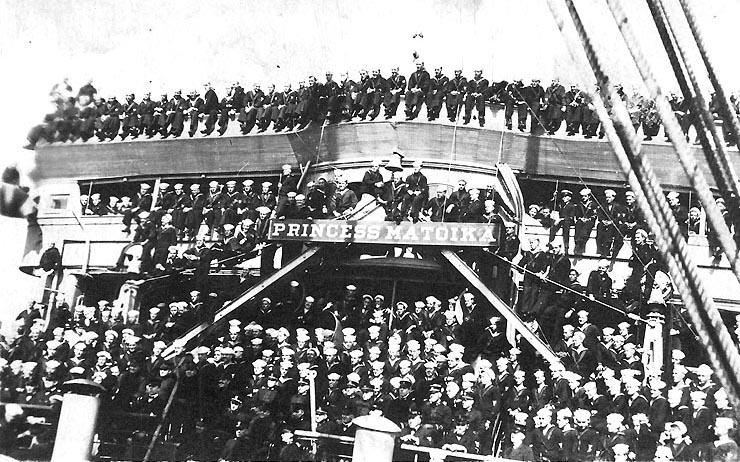
Officers and crew of Princess Matoika in 1918

After loading officers and men from the 29th Infantry Division on 13 June Princess Matoika set sail from Newport News the next day with Wilhelmina, Pastores, Lenape, and British troopship Czar. On the morning of 16 June lookouts on Princess Matoika spotted a submarine and, soon after, a torpedo heading directly for the ship. The torpedo missed her by a few yards and gunners manning the ship's 6-inch (150 mm) guns claimed a hit on the sub with their second shot. Later that morning, the Newport News ships met up with the New York portion of the convoy—which included DeKalb, Finland, Kroonland, George Washington, Covington, Rijndam, Dante Alighieri, and British steamer Vauben—and set out for France. The convoy was escorted by cruisers North Carolina and Frederick, and destroyers Stevens and Fairfax; battleship Texas and several other destroyers joined in escort duties for the group for a time. The convoy had a false alarm when a floating barrel was mistaken for submarine, but otherwise uneventfully arrived at Brest on the afternoon of 27 June. Princess Matoika, Covington, Lenape, Rijndam, George Washington, DeKalb, Wilhelmina, and Dante Alighieri left Brest as a group on 30 June. The following evening at 21:15, Covington was torpedoed by U-86 and sank the next afternoon. Princess Matoika and Wilhelmina arrived back at Newport News on 13 July.

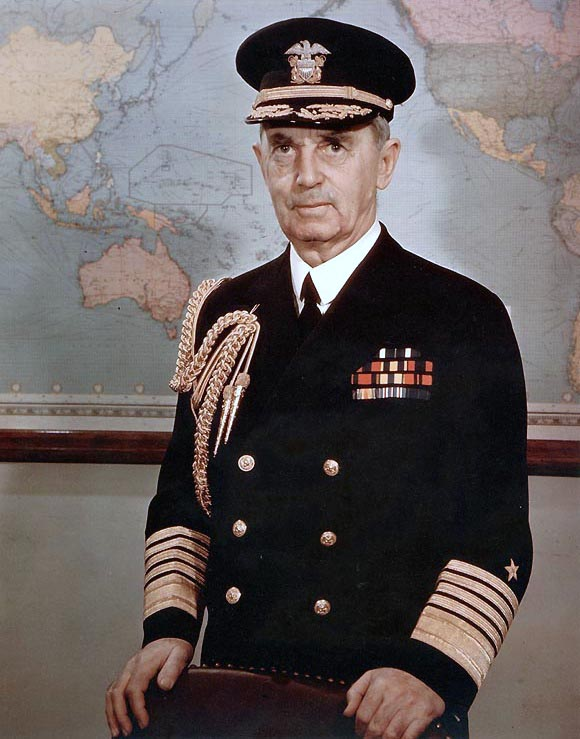
William D. Leahy (seen here c. 1945) earned the Navy Cross while commander of USS Princess Matoika in 1918.

Around this time, Commander Leahy left Princess Matoika to serve as Director of Gunnery Exercises and Engineering Performance in Washington. For his service on Princess Matoika, though, Leahy was awarded the Navy Cross. He was cited for distinguished service as commander of the ship while "engaged in the important, exacting and hazardous duty of transporting and escorting troops and supplies through waters infested with enemy submarines and mines".

Over the next months Princess Matoika successfully completed two additional roundtrips from Newport News. On the first trip, she left Newport News with DeKalb, Dante Alighiere, Wilhelmina, Pastores, and British troopship Czaritza on 18 July. The group joined a New York contingent and arrived in France on 30 July. Departing soon after, the Princess returned to Newport News on 13 August. Nine days later she departed in the company of the same ships from her last convoy—with French steamer Lutetia replacing DeKalb—and arrived in France on 3 September. Princess Matoika returned stateside two weeks later.

On 23 September Princess Matoika departed New York with 3,661 officers and men accompanied by transports President Grant, Mongolia, Rijndam, Wilhelmina, British steamer Ascanius, and was escorted by battleship Georgia, cruisers Montana and North Carolina, and destroyer Rathburne. As with other Navy ships throughout 1918, Princess Matoika was not immune to the worldwide Spanish flu pandemic. On this particular crossing, two of her crewmen were felled by the disease as her convoy reached Saint-Nazaire on 6 October. After her return to the U.S. on 21 October, she departed New York once again on 28 October, arriving in France on 9 November, two days before the Armistice. In all she carried 21,216 troops to France on her six trips overseas.

=== Returning troops home ===
With the fighting at an end, the task of bringing home American soldiers began almost immediately. Princess Matoika did her part by carrying home 30,110 healthy and wounded men in eight roundtrips. On 20 December, three thousand troops boarded her and departed France for Newport News, arriving there on 1 January 1919. Among those carried were Major General Charles T. Menoher, the newly appointed chief of the air service, and elements of the 39th Infantry Division. The Matoika arrived with another two thousand troops on 11 February.

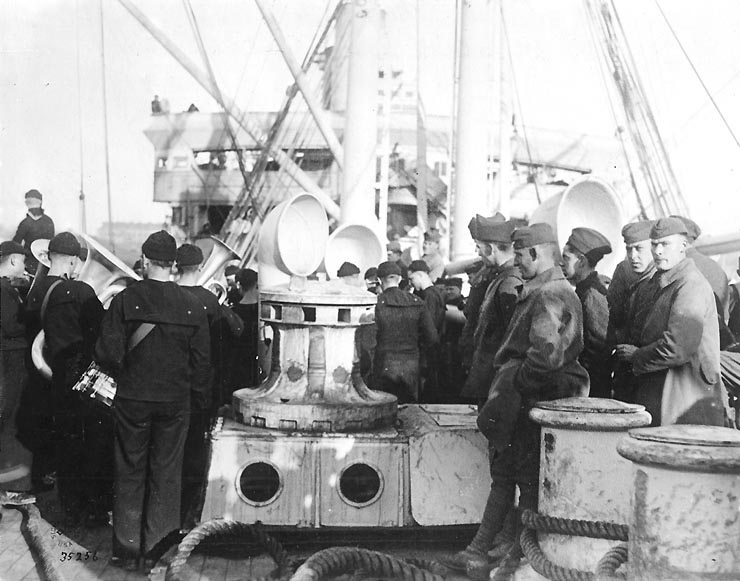
A combined Army–Navy band greets soldiers boarding Princess Matoika to return to the United States.

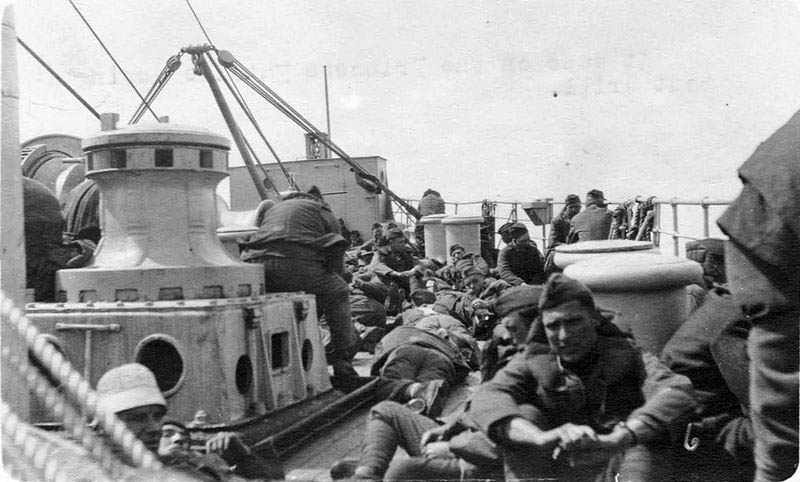
At rest during a boat drill

In March 1919 Princess Matoika and Rijndam raced each other from Saint-Nazaire to Newport News in a friendly competition that received national press coverage in the United States. Rijndam, the slower ship, was just able to edge out the Princess—and cut two days from her previous fastest crossing time—by appealing to the honor of the soldiers of the 133rd Field Artillery (returning home aboard the former Holland America liner) and employing them as extra stokers for her boilers.

On her next trip the veteran transport loaded troops at Saint-Nazaire that included nine complete hospital units. After two days delay because of storms in the Bay of Biscay, Princess Matoika departed on 16 April, and arrived at Newport News on 27 April with 3,500 troops. Shifting south to Charleston, South Carolina, the Matoika embarked 2,200 former German prisoners of war (POWs) and hauled them to Rotterdam. This trip was followed up in May with the return of portions of the 79th Infantry Division from Saint-Nazaire to New York.

In mid-July Princess Matoika delivered another load of 1,900 former German POWs from Charleston to Rotterdam; most of these prisoners were officers and men from interned German passenger liners and included Captain Heinler the former commander of Vaterland. One former POW, shortly after debarking in Europe, presciently commented that "this [was] no peace; only a temporary truce". After loading American crews of returned Dutch ships, Princess Matoika called at Antwerp and Brest before returning to New York on 1 August.

The ship departed New York on 8 August for her final roundtrip as a Navy transport. She departed Brest 23 August and returned to New York on 10 September. She was decommissioned there on 19 September, and handed over to the War Department for use as a United States Army transport.

== USAT Princess Matoika ==
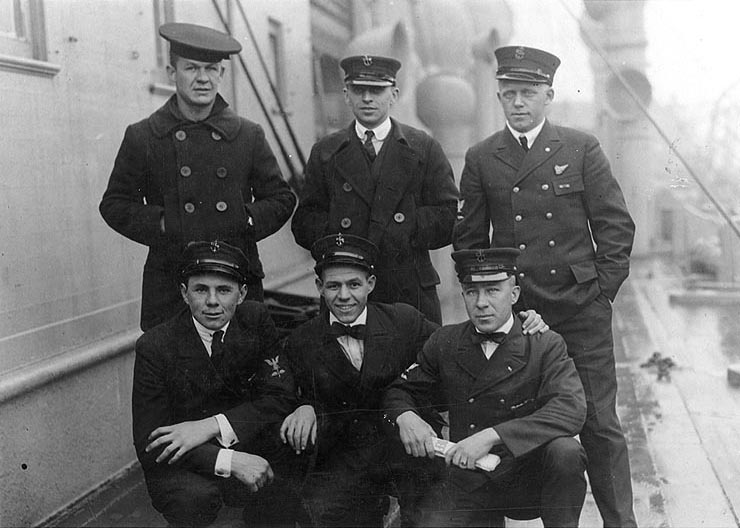
These six U.S. Navy petty officers, posing on the deck of USAT Princess Matoika, were part of a Navy group headed to attempt a transatlantic flight in the rigid airship R38 from the United Kingdom. Chief Boatswain's Mate M. Lay (front center) and Chief Machinist's Mate W. A. Julius (rear left) were among the 45 men killed in the crash of the airship on 24 August 1921.

As her career as an Army transport began, Princess Matoika picked up where her Navy career had ended and continued the return of American troops from Europe. After returning to France she loaded 2,965 troops at Brest—including Brigadier General W. P. Richardson and members of the Polar Bear Expedition, part of the Allied intervention in the Russian Civil War—for a return to New York on 15 October. In December, Congressman Charles H. Randall (Prohibitionist-CA) and his wife sailed on the Matoika to Puerto Rico and the Panama Canal.

On 5 April Princess Matoika carried a group of 18 men and three officers of the U.S. Navy who were to attempt a transatlantic flight in the rigid airship R38, being built in England for the Navy. Several of the group that traveled on the Matoika were among the 45 men killed when the airship crashed on 24 August 1921.

In May 1920 Princess Matoika took on board the bodies of ten female nurses and more than four hundred soldiers who had died while on duty in France during the war. The ship then transited the Kiel Canal and picked up 1,600 U.S. residents of Polish descent at Danzig, all of whom had enlisted in the Polish Army at the outset of the war. Also included among the passengers were 500 U.S. soldiers who had been released from occupation duty at Koblenz. The ship arrived at New York on 23 May with little fanfare and no ceremony; bodies returned but not claimed by families were buried at Arlington National Cemetery. On 21 July Princess Matoika arrived in New York after a similar voyage with 25 war brides, many repatriated Polish troops among its 2,094 steerage passengers, and the remains of 881 soldiers. In between these two trips, the Belgian Ambassador to the United States, Baron Emile de Cartier de Marchienne, sailed from New York to Belgium on board the Matoika. It was, however, Princess Matoika's next trip to Belgium that was the most infamous.

=== The "mutiny" ===
Beginning 26 July 1920, a majority of the U.S. Olympic contingent destined for the 1920 Summer Olympics in Antwerp, Belgium, endured a troubled transatlantic journey aboard Princess Matoika. The voyage and the events on board, later called the "Mutiny of the Matoika", were still being discussed in the popular press years later. The Matoika was a last-minute substitute for another ship and, according to the athletes, did not have adequate accommodations or training facilities on board. The conditions on the Princess Matoika were terrible, as the hold reeked of formaldehyde from the dead bodies, and there was no place to train. Furthermore, the athletes were dissatisfied with the quality of food and huge numbers of rats present on the ship. Near the end of the voyage, the athletes published a list of grievances and demands and distributed copies of the document to the United States Secretary of War, the American Olympic Committee members, and the press. Among these were the demands for better accommodations in Antwerp, cabin passage home, and railroad fare from New York to their home cities. The incident received wide coverage in American newspapers at the time.

After the contingent of athletes debarked at Antwerp on 8 August, Princess Matoika made one more voyage of note while under U.S. Army control. The Matoika sailed for New York on 24 August and arrived on 4 September carrying a portion of the returning Olympic team, American Boy Scouts returning from the International Boy Scout Jamboree in London, and the remains of 1,284 American soldiers for repatriation.

== U.S. Mail Line ==
At the conclusion of her Army service Princess Matoika was handed over to the United States Shipping Board (USSB), who chartered the vessel to the United States Mail Steamship Company for service from New York to Italy. This solution of how to use the Princess for civilian service was the culmination of efforts by the USSB to find a suitable civilian use for her. In 1919 she was one of the ships suggested for a proposed service from New Orleans, Louisiana, to Valparaíso, Chile, and in November 1919, tentative plans were announced for her service with the Munson Line between New York and Argentina beginning in mid-1920, but both of these proposals fell through.

SS Princess Alice, in North German Lloyd livery, is depicted sailing among icebergs in this pre-war postcard.

Outfitted for 350 cabin-class and 500 third-class passengers and at 10,421 gross register tons (GRT), Princess Matoika kicked off her U.S. Mail Line service on 20 January 1921, sailing from New York to Naples and Genoa on her first of three roundtrips between these ports. After a storm damaged her steering gear she had to be towed back in to New York on 28 January.

After repairs and a successful eastbound crossing, Princess Matoika had an encounter with an iceberg off Newfoundland while carrying some two thousand Italian immigrants on her first return trip from Italy. On the night of 24 February the fully laden ship struck what was reported in The New York Times as either "an iceberg or a submerged wreck" off Cape Race. The ship's steering gear was damaged in the collision, leaving the ship adrift for over seven hours before repairs were effected. The Matoika's captain indicated that no passengers were hurt in the collision. According to the story of one third-class passenger, she, suspecting there was something seriously amiss, made inquiry after the commotion. A crew member told her that the Matoika had stopped only to greet a ship passing in the night. When she went on deck, insistent on seeing the other ship herself, she saw the iceberg and observed the first-class passengers queued up to board the already-lowered lifeboats (the sinking of the Titanic had been nine years earlier). She took her daughter with her to join one of the queues, and, though initially rebuffed, was allowed to remain. The lifeboats were never deployed, however, and the Matoika arrived in Boston, where she had been diverted due to a typhus scare, on 28 February without further incident.

On the Matoika's third and final return voyage from Italy, begun on 17 May, U.S. Customs Service agents at New York seized $150,000 worth of cocaine—along with valuable silks and jewels—being smuggled into the United States. Officials speculated that because of a maritime strike, members of a smuggling ring were able to infiltrate the crew of the ship.

After her withdrawal from the Italian route, Princess Matoika was transferred to New York–Bremen service, sailing on her first commercial trip to Germany since before the war, on 14 June. In July, during her second roundtrip on the Bremen route, late rental payments to the USSB resulted in action to seize the nine ships chartered by the U.S. Mail Line, including the Matoika, after its return from Bremen. The ships were turned over to United American Lines—W. Averell Harriman's steamship company—for temporary operation. After some legal wrangling by both the USSB and the U.S. Mail Line—and in light of financial irregularities by the U.S. Mail Line that were uncovered—the ships were permanently retained by the USSB in August.

== United States Lines ==
Upon the formation of the United States Lines in August 1921, Princess Matoika and the eight other ex-German liners formerly operated by the U.S. Mail Line were transferred to the new company for operation. The Princess, still on New York–Bremen service, sailed on her first voyage for the new steamship line on 15 September. In October Matoika crewmen were reported as taking advantage of the German inflation by consuming champagne available for $1.00 per quart and mugs of "the best beer" for an American penny. In November, United States Lines announced that Princess Matoika would be replaced on the Bremen route in order to better compete with North German Lloyd, the liner's former owner, but that never came about. The Princess continued on runs to Bremen, calling at the additional ports of Queenstown, Southampton, and Danzig, as her schedule shifted from time to time.

On 28 January 1922 the Matoika departed with 400 passengers, among them 312 Polish orphans headed for repatriation in their homeland. Two days and 100 nautical miles (190 km) out of New York, the liner experienced a heavy gale that disabled her steering gear, and forced her return to New York after temporary repairs failed. The captain was able to steer her through the use of the ship's engines, and arrived safely back in port on 31 January. This incident was the yet another misfortune that had befallen the young Poles. After being orphaned by the fighting between Polish and Soviet forces, the orphans had been taken across Siberia, evacuated to Japan, transported to Seattle, Washington, and taken by rail to Chicago, Illinois, where they were enrolled in school while searches for relatives in Poland were conducted.

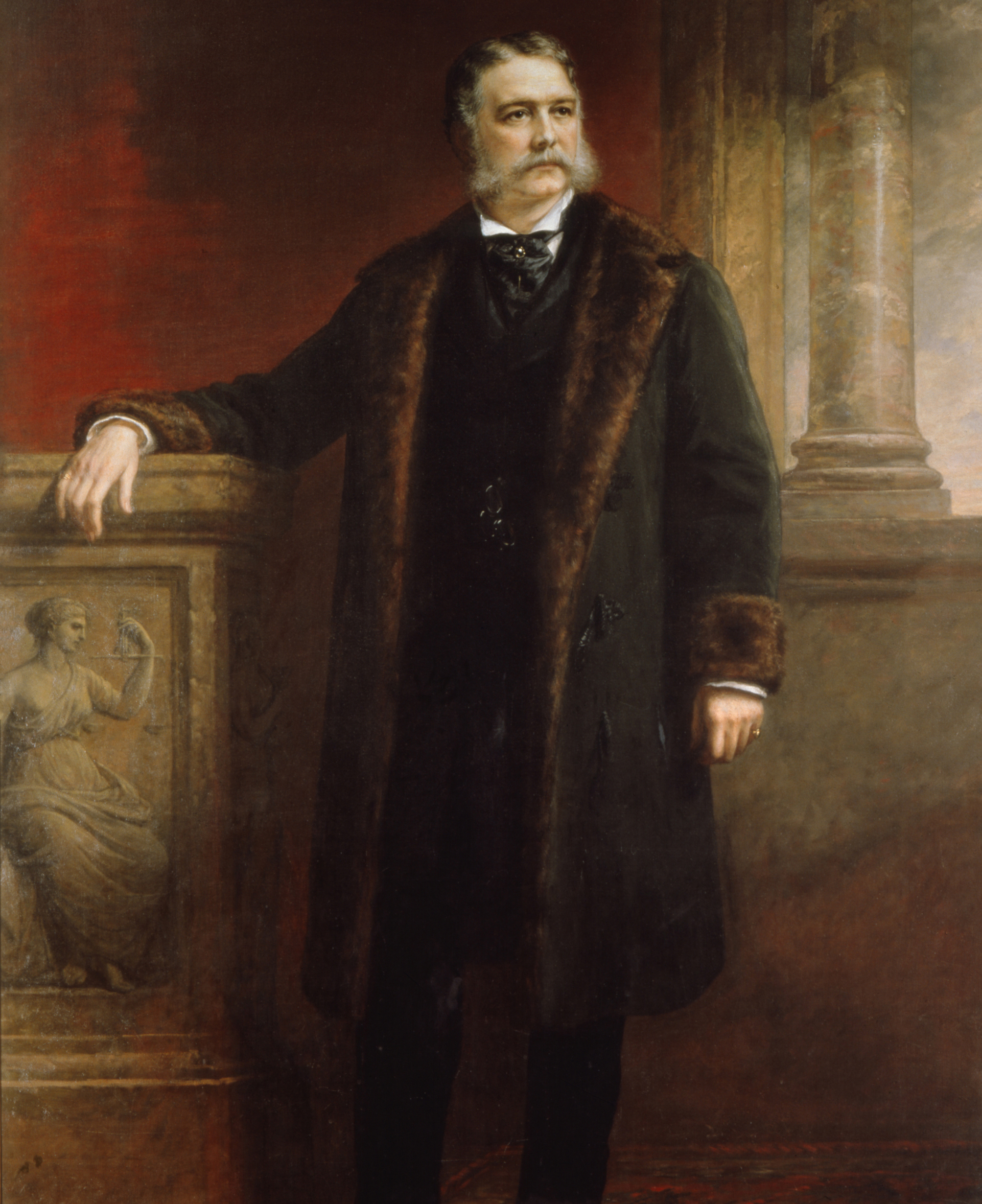
Chester A. Arthur, the 21st U.S. President, was the namesake for President Arthur.

After four Bremen roundtrips for United States Lines, Princess Matoika had sailed her last voyage under that name. When newly built Type 535 vessels named for American presidents came into service for the company in May 1922, the Princess was renamed SS President Arthur in honor of the 21st U.S. President, Chester A. Arthur, matching the naming style of the new ships.

After her rename, she continued plying the North Atlantic between New York and Bremen, and was involved in a few episodes of note during this time. In June 1922, two years into Prohibition in the United States, President Arthur was raided while at her dock in Hoboken, New Jersey, which netted 150 cases of smuggled spirits. Officials involved denied reports that the raid was conducted as a legal test case intended to test the determination of USSB chair Albert Lasker that United States-flagged ships could carry and sell alcohol outside the three-mile territorial limit of the United States. Congressman James A. Gallivan (D-MA), an anti-prohibition leader, publicly demanded to know why the ship had not been seized for violating U.S. laws.

In September President Arthur carried Irish republicans Muriel MacSwiney, widow of the recently deceased Lord Mayor of Cork Terence MacSwiney, and Linda Mary Kearns, who had been jailed for murder under the Black and Tans, to New York. Wearing buttons with pictures of Harry Boland, an anti-treaty Irish nationalist who had been killed the previous month, the two women were there to raise funds for orphans of Anti-Treaty IRA forces, who were then fighting in southern Ireland. In October a Hoboken man, after securing a last-minute court order, was able to halt the deportation of his German niece on President Arthur; she was retrieved from the ship ten minutes before sailing time.

In November 1922 U.S. Customs Service agents, seized a cache of Colt magazine guns aboard President Arthur. The entire crew was questioned but all denied any knowledge of the eight weapons found stowed behind a bulkhead. In August the following year, President Arthur took on board a seaman suffering from pneumonia from the Norwegian freighter Eastern Star in a mid-ocean transfer. The ship's doctor and nurse attended to the sailor but were unable to save him.

President Arthur sailed on her last transatlantic voyage from Bremen on 18 October 1923, carrying 656 passengers to New York. Anchoring off Gravesend Bay on 30 October, President Arthur was one of fifteen passenger ships whose arrival in New York was timed to coincide with the opening of the November immigration quota period. Under the Emergency Quota Act passed in 1921, numerical limits on European immigration were imposed which created nationality quotas. At the conclusion of this voyage, President Arthur was laid up in Baltimore, Maryland, for almost a year.

== American Palestine Line ==
The flag of the American Palestine Line

On 9 October 1924 the newly formed American Palestine Line announced that it had purchased President Arthur from the USSB, with plans to inaugurate service between New York and Palestine the following March. The American Palestine Line was formed in 1924 for the purpose of providing direct passenger service from New York to Palestine and was reportedly the first steamship company owned and operated by Jews. The company had negotiated to purchase three ocean liners from the USSB but was able to purchase only President Arthur. After refurbishing the liner, the company inaugurated service between New York and Palestine in March 1925, when President Arthur sailed on her maiden voyage. A crowd of fifteen thousand witnessed ceremonies that included songs, prayers, and speeches in English and Yiddish. The company claimed that President Arthur was the first ocean liner to fly the Zionist flag at sea, and the first ocean liner ever to have female officers.

The line had labor difficulties and financial difficulties throughout its existence. Rumors of a mutiny during President Arthur's first trip were reported in The New York Times, and several crew members got into an altercation with members of the Blackshirts, the Italian fascist paramilitary group, when the liner made an intermediary stop in Naples. On her second voyage, the ship's master-at-arms was killed by a fellow crew member. Financial difficulties included unpaid bills and resultant court actions, and accusations of fraud against company officers that were leveled in the press. In late 1925 the company was placed in the hands of a receiver, President Arthur—after a two-alarm fire in her forward cargo hold—ended up back in the hands of the USSB, and the company's office furniture and fixtures were sold at auction in early 1926.

== Los Angeles Steamship Company ==
In August 1926 the Los Angeles Steamship Company (LASSCO) announced the acquisition of President Arthur from the USSB. The liner would be extensively rebuilt and then sail opposite of City of Los Angeles (the former North German Lloyd liner Grosser Kurfürst) on a Los Angeles–Hawaii route. Arriving from New York on 24 September, the ship was docked at Los Angeles Shipbuilding and Drydock to immediately begin a $2.5 million refit. Although initially planned to be ready for February 1927 sailings, progress was slowed by drydock access, and her completion date was pushed to May. During her refit, the ship was renamed City of Honolulu, becoming the second LASSCO ship of that name. At the conclusion of her reconstruction in May, City of Honolulu sailed on a 24-hour shakedown cruise.

=== Maiden voyage ===
City of Honolulu was rebuilt to 10,680 GRT and had accommodations for around 450 first-class and 50 third-class passengers. Her hull was painted all white for LASSCO service, and she sported period designs in her common areas. The dining room, large enough to seat 300 in a single sitting, was decorated in a Grecian theme, and featured eighteen stained glass windows designed by San Diego architect Carleton Winslow. The smoking room was done up in a Tudor style; the music room was decorated in a combined French and Italian Renaissance manner; and the writing room was in Adam style. The suites were all done in either Adam, Queen Anne, or Louis XVI styles. The ship featured six passenger elevators, and a swimming pool patterned on a Pompeian design. One of the few remaining traces of her pre-war German decoration was the rosewood railing on her grand staircase.

On 4 June 1927 a crowd of seven thousand well-wishers saw City of Honolulu depart on her maiden voyage. The festivities were also broadcast on radio station KGFO, a portable station operating form the front cargo deck of the ship. During the journey, broadcasts of the City of Honolulu's orchestra, along with radio personalities and musicians from Los Angeles station KHJ, entertained both passengers and listeners on shore (while the ship was in range).

Several notable passengers sailed on the liner's maiden voyage. Jay Gould II, tennis champion and grandson of railroad tycoon Jay Gould, sailed for a three-month stay at his Hawaiian home. Also sailing were movie star Laura La Plante and her husband, director William A. Seiter, and, Western Auto founder George Pepperdine, who began a three-month tour of the Orient with his daughters. On arrival in Honolulu on 10 June, City of Honolulu was adorned with flowers and received a welcome from airplanes and a flotilla of outrigger canoes that escorted her into the harbor. After a ten-day stay in the islands, she departed for Los Angeles, returning there on 26 June.

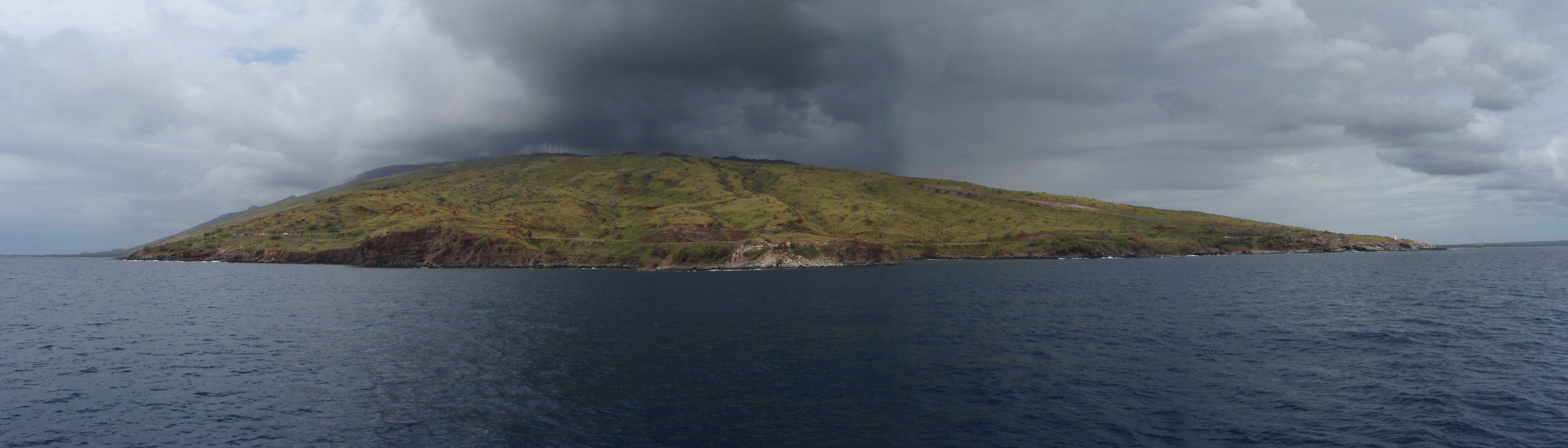
On City of Honolulu's passage from Hilo to Honolulu, travelers would have seen a view of Maui similar to this one, taken from the ʻAuʻau Channel in December 2007.

=== Career ===
After her maiden voyage City of Honolulu began regular service from Los Angeles to Honolulu and Hilo on what LASSCO called the "Great Circle Route of Sunshine". After arriving at Honolulu, the ship would sail southeast to Hilo, passing the islands of Molokai and Maui on their north sides. On the return from Hilo, the liner would traverse the ʻAlalākeiki, the ʻAuʻau, and the Kalohi Channels, taking the ship between Maui and Molokai on the north and the islands of Kahoolawe and Lanai on the south.

Throughout her career, City of Honolulu transported many notable passengers to Hawaii. In July 1927, for example, Henry Smith Pritchett, president of the Carnegie Foundation, sailed to Hawaii en route to a meeting with the Institute of Pacific Relations. In June 1928 movie stars Norma Talmadge, Gilbert Roland, and Lottie Pickford began a Hawaiian vacation, and on 28 July, Jane Addams, the founder of Hull House and a pioneer of the settlement movement, headed there as well. Addams was on her way to attend the Pan-Pacific Women's Conference and the congress of the Women's International League for Peace and Freedom; a former Governor of Hawaii, Walter F. Frear, returned to the islands on that same voyage. In December Al Jolson and his wife, Ruby Keeler, sailed on the liner for a vacation, and early the next February, the reigning British Open golf champion, Walter Hagen, sailed to start a four-month golfing tour and exhibition in Australia. Hagan was accompanied by Australian golfer Joe Kirkwood; Arctic explorer Donald B. MacMillan also left for Hawaii on the same sailing.

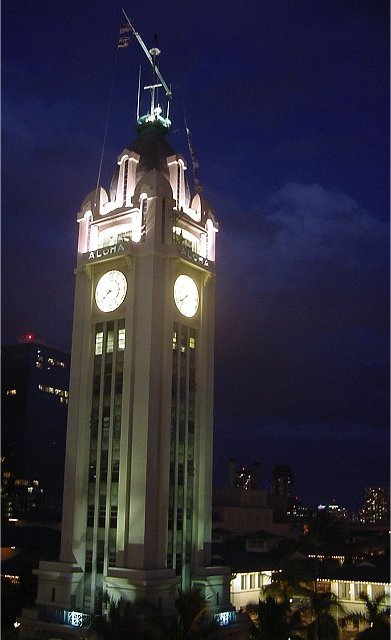
Aloha Tower at Honolulu Harbor welcomed the City of Honolulu and her passengers on their arrival in Hawaii.

City of Honolulu also carried notable visitors to the mainland. Farris M. Brown, a dealer in Stradivarius instruments, arrived in Los Angeles in May 1928 with three of the famous maker's violins, including the Baron Knoop Stradivarius. In April 1929 Swedish swimmer Arne Borg, accompanied by his wife, arrived in Los Angeles on a world swimming tour, and in May, Sir James Gunnson, a former Mayor of Auckland, arrived for a one-month visit to promote increased trade between California and New Zealand. The next January, Herbert Hagerman, former Governor of New Mexico Territory; author Basil Woon, who had been doing research for a Hawaiian story; and aviation promoter and chewing gum magnate William Easterwood all sailed stateside on the ship. Later that January, it carried the body of Lena Pepperdine, late wife of George Pepperdine, who had died of psittacosis in Honolulu in the 1929–1930 psittacosis pandemic.

Apart from notable passengers carried during her tenure, City of Honolulu also frequently served as a conveyance for newlyweds heading for Hawaiian honeymoons. She also carried, in addition to passengers, cargo in both directions, transporting commodities, such as fertilizer and oil, to Hawaii, and Hawaiian goods, like sugar and fresh and canned pineapple to the mainland.

=== Fire and scrapping ===
City of Honolulu's career as a tropical liner, however, was short-lived. On the afternoon of 25 May 1930, just shy of completing three years of LASSCO service, a fire broke out on her B deck while she was docked in her namesake city. Although aided by fireboat Leleiona and U.S. Navy submarine rescue ship Widgeon, firefighters were unable to bring the blaze under control quickly, and it spread to 100 short tons (91 t) of potash aboard the liner. Fears that her cargo of 16,000 barrels (2,500 m^{3}) of oil would explode caused firefighters to intentionally sink the liner at her pier in order to help extinguish the conflagration. Through firefighters' efforts, the fire was contained to the upper three decks, leaving the ship's power plant relatively undamaged. All crew members and LASSCO employees on board the ship got off safely; no passengers were on the ship at the time of the fire.

The ship was pumped out and raised on 9 June, and taken to the naval drydock at Pearl Harbor for inspection on 12 June. While remaining in Hawaii, one engine was restored to working order and the ship departed for Los Angeles under her own power on 30 October. After her arrival, further inspections were conducted, and it was determined that repairs would be too expensive, especially given the global economic conditions. City of Honolulu was declared a total loss, and was laid up in the West Basin of Los Angeles Harbor for almost three years. During her lay up, fittings and fixtures stripped from the vessel were auctioned in July 1932, and in December, film crews from Columbia Pictures Corporation spent ten days filming on board the ship.

City of Honolulu was sold to Japanese shipbreakers in mid 1933, and—in the company of Calawaii, another LASSCO ship destined for the scrap heap—the City of Honolulu departed Los Angeles in late August under her own power. Manned by a Filipino crew, the 33-year-old liner developed a problem with one of her boilers almost immediately and had to put into San Francisco for repairs. Getting underway after a lengthy delay, one of her engines failed in mid-ocean, leaving her to plod on to Japan on one engine. She eventually arrived in Osaka at the shipbreaker in mid-December, and was scrapped shortly thereafter.
