= Flag of Mandatory Palestine =

Palestinian flag from 1920 to 1948

Union Flag used on land for official purposes

Palestine maritime ensign

Palestine customs and postal services ensign

Flag of the High Commissioner

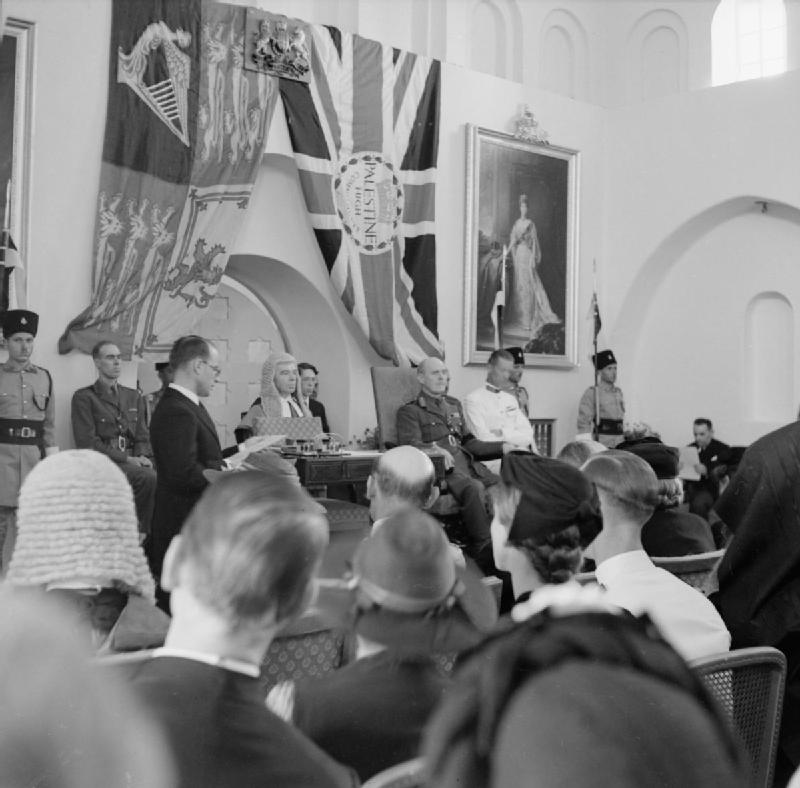
The 6th Viscount Gort being sworn in as High Commissioner for Palestine (1944); the High Commissioner's flag is at centre.

During the Mandate period in Palestine, between 1920 and 1948, when Palestine was governed by Britain under terms which were formalised in the League of Nations Mandate for Palestine of July 24, 1922, the de facto flag was the Union Jack or Union Flag of the United Kingdom, but several localised flags existed for Mandate government departments and government officials. The only Palestine-specific flag not restricted to official government use was the Palestine ensign (red with the Union Flag in the canton, and a white circle on the fly with the mandate's name inside it), which was flown by ships registered in the British Mandate territory from 1927 to 1948. It was based on the British Red Ensign (civil ensign) instead of the Blue Ensign (used as the basis for the flags of nearly all other British-ruled territories in Africa and Asia) since it was intended for use only at sea by non-government ships.

== History ==
The first High Commissioner Herbert Samuel considered introducing an official flag for Palestine, but found it impossible to come up with a design that would satisfy the diverging interests of all the inhabitants. So the administration continued to use the British Union Jack.

The maritime ensign was introduced in 1927 with the following notice.

Flag to be flown by Palestinian vessels.
It is hereby notified that a Warrant has been issued by the Lords Commissioners of the Admiralty authorising the Red Ensign of His Majesty's Fleet defaced on the fly thereof by the word "Palestine" in a white circular field to be used on board vessels belonging to inhabitants of Palestine. G.S. SYMES, Chief Secretary, 30th November, 1927.

The vessels of Palestine Customs had their own flags from 1929. The first design was "the Blue Ensign defaced by a white circle with the words 'Palestine Customs'". In the following year, the single flag was replaced by two flags:

The flag to be flown on Customs-House and Vessels in the service of the Customs shall be the Blue Ensign defaced by the word "Palestine" within a white circular field. Vessels in the service of the Customs shall fly, in addition to the defaced Blue Ensign at the stern, a jack at the bow consisting of a square blue flag with a Union in the upper canton next to the staff, defaced in the fly by the word "Customs".

== Arab flags in Mandatory Palestine ==
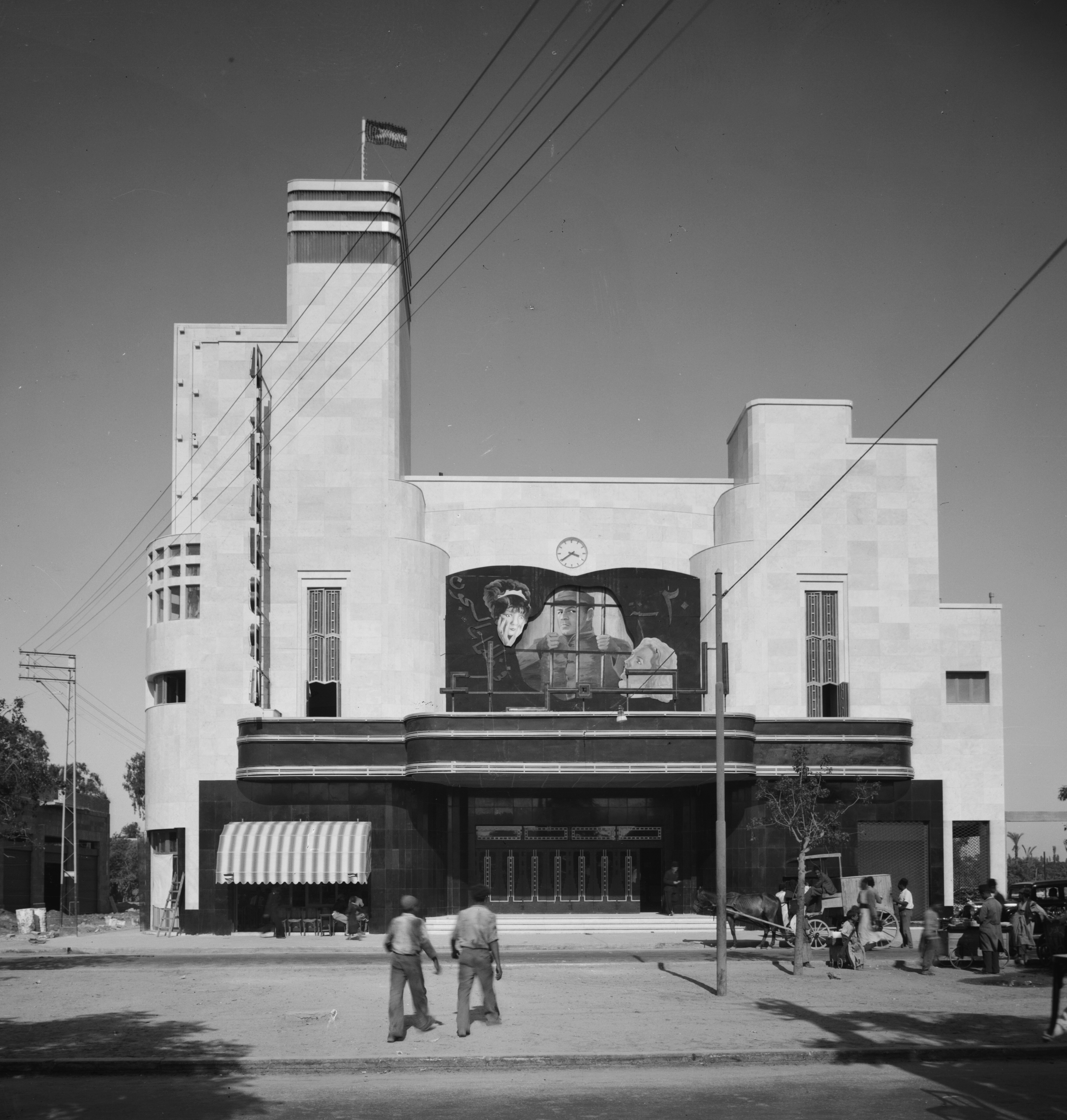
The Palestinian Arab flag over the Alhambra Cinema, Jaffa, Mandatory Palestine, 1937

Palestinian Arabs sometimes flew their own flags, often variations of the Flag of the Arab Revolt. In 1929, a discussion was held for a Palestinian national flag and the newspaper Filastin published on its front page a proposal to establish a Palestinian national flag and anthem. Various different flags were proposed; they were mainly based on the Flag of the Arab Revolt but also included the use of crosses with crescents and the colour orange. During the 1936-39 Arab revolt in Palestine a group was photographed with a flag similar to the current Palestinian flag but with a crescent and cross as well as Arabic inscription.

The original flag of the Arab Revolt used during World War I

The modified Arab Revolt flag which became widely used following the war; many Palestinian nationalist flags were based on this.

== Jewish flags in Mandatory Palestine ==
1925 article in Falastin, setting out objections to the flying of the Zionist flag under the guise of it being the flag of the HaKoah football team, given the ban against the Arab flag. It concludes by stating that the only official flag of the state is the Union Jack.

Emanuel ship's Hebrew flag, Sep 1933

The use of Zionist or Hebrew flags was common in the Yishuv, as the body of Jewish residents in Palestine was known before the establishment of the State of Israel, and such flags were often flown by such Yishuv institutions as The Jewish Agency or the Histadrut. However, the Yishuv constituted only one of the country's main ethnic communities - the other such community, the Palestinian Arabs, being opposed to the Zionist movement and to this movement's flag(s). Thus, Hebrew flags were never recognised or given an official status by the British authorities, which throughout the changes in their Palestine policy always asserted an impartiality as between Jews and Arabs - the only official Flag of Palestine being the Union Jack and its derivatives, as noted above.

In 1934 The National Geographic Magazine published a photo of a flag flown by a schooner named Emanuel- the single vessel owned by the Palestine-based, Zionist-oriented Hofiya Shipping Company, then on her maiden voyage. The caption read: "The 'Emanuel', flying a Palestine flag, anchors at Southampton, England. This Jewish trading vessel was the first to fly her country's new banner. Palestine, under British mandate, has a badge, but its Jewish population has created this flag of their own -- Solomon's seal on a field of blue and white." A few months after the photo's publication the Emanuel was lost with all hands in the North Sea, putting an end to the Hofiya Company.

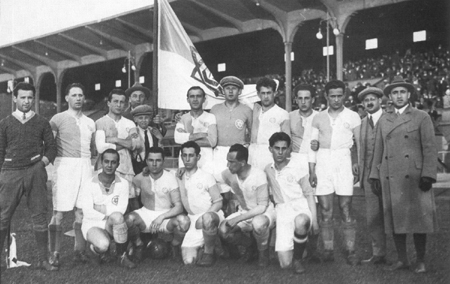
Jewish flag used by HaKoah Vienna in 1925

== See also ==
- Flag of Israel
- Flag of Jordan
- Flag of Palestine
- Public Seal of Mandatory Palestine
