= American Palestine Line =

Former American steamship company

The flag of the American Palestine Line

The American Palestine Line was a steamship company which provided direct passenger service from New York City to Mandatory Palestine. It was reportedly the first steamship company owned and operated by Jewish people. Formed in 1924, the company negotiated to purchase three ocean liners from the United States Shipping Board, but it was only able to purchase one, SS President Arthur, a former North German Lloyd steamer that operated as Princess Alice before being seized by the United States during World War I. After refurbishing the liner, the company inaugurated service between New York and Mandatory Palestine in March 1925, when President Arthur sailed on her maiden voyage. A crowd of 15,000 witnessed ceremonies that included songs, prayers, and speeches in English and Yiddish. The company claimed that President Arthur was the first ocean liner to fly the Zionist flag at sea and the first ocean liner ever to have female officers.

The line had labor difficulties and financial difficulties throughout its existence. On President Arthur's first trip in 1925, rumors of a mutiny were reported in The New York Times, and several crew members got into an altercation with members of the Blackshirts, the Italian fascist paramilitary group, when the liner made an intermediary stop in Naples. On her second voyage, the ship's master-at-arms was killed by a fellow crew member. Financial difficulties included unpaid bills and resultant court actions as well as accusations of fraud against company officers that were leveled in the press. In late 1925 the company was placed in the hands of a receiver; President Arthur—after a two-alarm fire in her forward cargo hold—ended up back in the hands of the United States Shipping Board (USSB), and the company's office furniture and fixtures were sold at auction in early 1926.

== Background ==
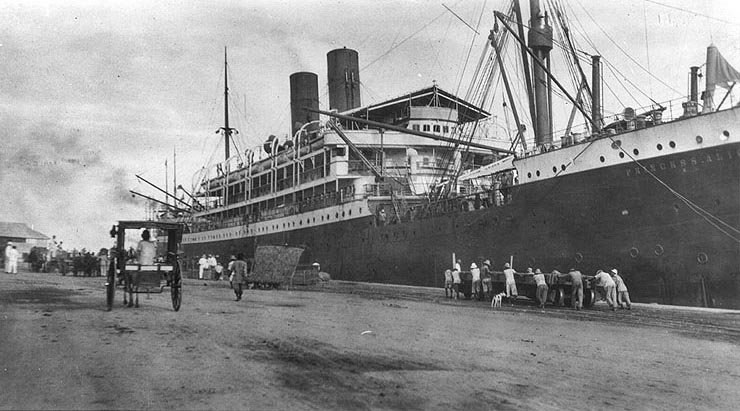
SS President Arthur was the former SS Princess Alice of North German Lloyd, seen here while interned in the Philippines.

The newly formed American Palestine Line, reportedly the first ever steamship company owned and operated by Jews, began working to institute direct passenger service from New York to Palestine. To that end, the company began negotiations with the United States Shipping Board (USSB) to purchase three former German ocean liners, sister ships President Fillmore and President Arthur and the smaller Mount Clay. On October 9, 1924, the American Palestine Line's president—Jacob S. Strahl, a New York Supreme Court justice—announced the purchase of President Arthur from the USSB, with plans to begin the Palestine service the following March. Strahl also publicly announced American Palestine's intent to acquire President Fillmore at the same time; plans for that acquisition and that of Mount Clay, however, never materialized.

== The ship ==
SS President Arthur was formerly Kiautschou, a Barbarossa-class ocean liner launched in September 1900 for the Hamburg America Line's Far East passenger and mail service. When Hamburg America withdrew from the service, the liner was traded to North German Lloyd, and regularly used—under the new name of Princess Alice—on both North Atlantic and Far East passenger routes. The liner was interned in the U.S.-controlled Philippines at the outset of World War I and was seized upon the American entry to the conflict. The ship was used as a transport ship for both the U.S. Navy and U.S. Army under the name Princess Matoika. After some post-war use as a passenger liner and yet another name change—this one in honor of the 21st U.S. President, Chester A. Arthur—she was taken out of service when changes in U.S. laws severely curtailed the number of immigrants that could enter the country in the early 1920s. At the time of the purchase by American Palestine, the ship had been laid up in Baltimore since late 1923.

News reports the following month fixed the purchase price of President Arthur at $60,000 cash, plus assurances that the liner would be reconditioned within six months. Announced plans for reconditioning included reducing passenger capacity to 675 and increasing the cargo capacity to 4,000 long tons (4,100 t). Also on tap were swimming pools, a game room, a gymnasium, a lecture hall, a social hall, and a moving picture theater. The line had originally planned to change the name of the liner to White Palace, but that was never brought about.

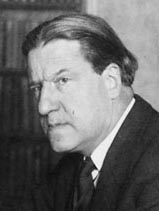
At the ceremonies for the maiden voyage of SS President Arthur, Rabbi Stephen S. Wise prayed for the voyage's success.

After undergoing reconditioning at Morse Dry Dock & Repair in Brooklyn, President Arthur was taken out for a 100-nautical-mile (190 km) shakedown cruise on March 7, 1925. Steaming off the New Jersey coast, President Arthur, expected by American Palestine officials to top out at 16 knots (30 km/h), reached a reported maximum cruising speed of 19.7 knots (36.5 km/h), which company officials claimed would reduce her travel time to Palestine by two or three days. At the end of the shakedown, the liner was docked at the foot of West Houston Street in preparation for her maiden voyage five days later.

The acquisition of President Arthur by American Palestine inspired Jewish lyricist Solomon Small to pen the song "President Arthur's Zion Ship" which contained these lines in its refrain:

President Arthur, sail
Blazing for my children a trail.
I have waited ages long
With a mother's yearning strong.

== Service begins ==
On the morning of March 12, 1925, crowds started gathering at President Arthur 's pier at 7:00 a.m. By the time the ceremonies—broadcast by New York's municipal radio station, WNYC—opened with the singing of both "The Star-Spangled Banner" and "Hatikvah", the crowd had swelled to 15,000 in number. The festivities included speeches and prayers from Orthodox Rabbi Moses S. Margolies; David Yellin, Vice Mayor of Jerusalem, who addressed the crowd in Yiddish; Rabbi David de Sola Pool; and Rabbi Stephen S. Wise. Cantor Josef Rosenblatt sang to the crowd and a telegram from New York merchant Nathan Straus, unable to attend the event, was read aloud. American Palestine Line president Jacob S. Strahl, in his remarks, made the claim that the sailing of President Arthur marked the first appearance "in more than 2,000 years of the flag of Judea on the high seas".

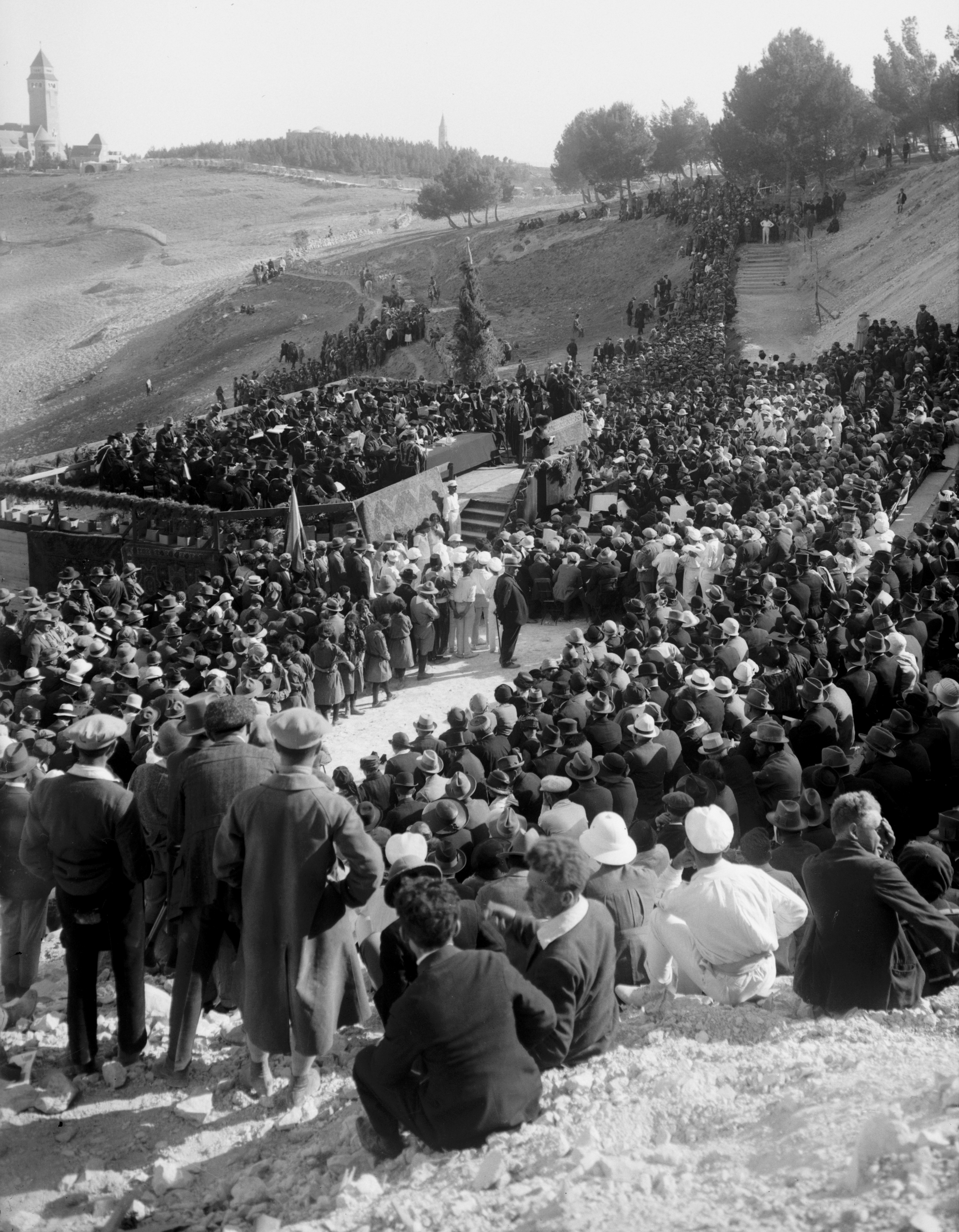
The dedication of the Hebrew University at Mount Scopus on April 1, 1925. Many passengers on President Arthur's maiden voyage for the American Palestine Line attended the ceremonies.

The ship, with Stars of David painted on her funnels, pulled away from the dock at eight minutes before noon, nearly an hour later than her planned departure time, and headed to Haifa, with an intermediate stop in Naples. On board were some 400 passengers from all over the United States and Canada, most of whom were tourists wanting to see the Holy Land. Many of the passengers, including a contingent from the University of Manitoba in Winnipeg, were also sailing in order to attend the dedication of the Hebrew University at Mount Scopus by former British Foreign Secretary Lord Balfour. President Arthur also carried agricultural equipment and trucks to be used for farm development in Palestine. In addition, the liner featured Bernice P. Schmitt and Rebecca Adelman, who, according to contemporary news reports, were the first ever female officers on an ocean liner.

Herman Hirsch, a Jewish male from Chicago on a pilgrimage to the Holy Land, kept an account of President Arthur's maiden voyage. On Friday, March 13, one day into the voyage, Hirsch reported that the torah was dedicated and a procession to songs and music accompanied a march over all parts of the ship. Afterwards, Rabbi Aaron M. Ashinsky of Pittsburgh, Pennsylvania, officiated at a service held in a chapel provided for the passengers.

Newspapers published radio dispatches emanating from President Arthur throughout her maiden voyage, thanks to a powerful new radio set installed aboard the liner. On March 14 the liner was able to avoid the worst of a gale that slowed Leviathan of the United States Lines, and on March 26 President Arthur was able to avoid a waterspout 50 nautical miles (93 km) east of Gibraltar. At Gibraltar, the local Jewish community chartered a ship to escort President Arthur through the Mediterranean. The ship docked at Naples on March 27, four days later than her planned arrival there, and departed the same day.

The liner arrived at Haifa on March 31, nearly a week late. Herman Hirsch reported that a passenger from Chicago, Jacob Drapekin, 72, had died aboard the ship on March 24. The man's dying wish was to be buried in the Holy Land, and the crew of President Arthur helped fulfill his wishes. After arrival in Haifa, his flag-draped coffin was placed on deck and services were conducted in English and Hebrew by Rabbi Ashinsky before the body was taken ashore for interment. A sizable crowd, comprising delegations from Jerusalem, Jaffa, and Tel Aviv, greeted the arriving ship. Most of the passengers on President Arthur were hurried to Jerusalem for the Hebrew University dedication ceremony the next day.

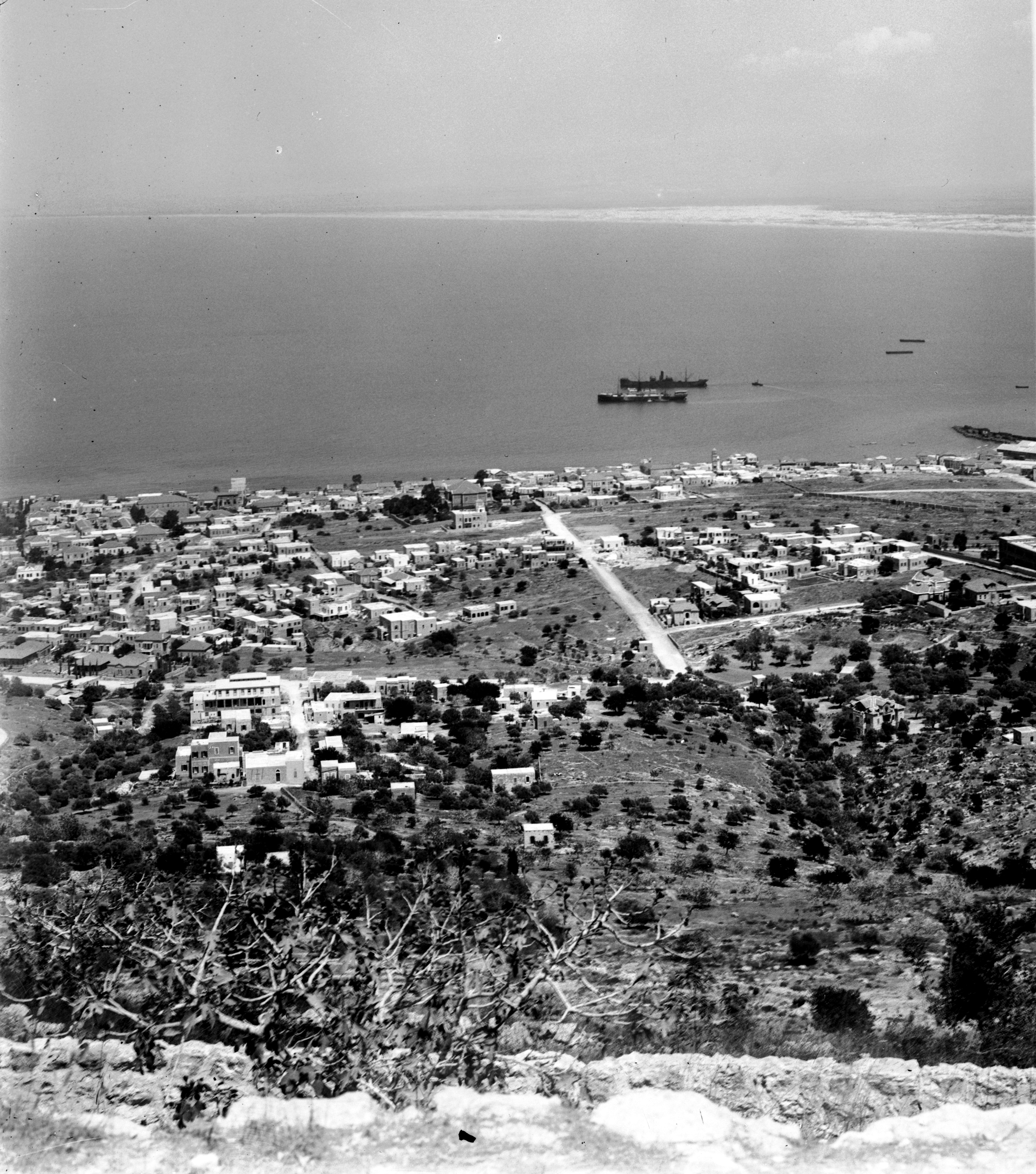
The anchorage at Haifa as it appeared around the time of President Arthur's visits

President Arthur departed Haifa on April 4 for a ten-day excursion in the Mediterranean, calling at Jaffa, Beirut, Alexandria, and Naples, among others, before sailing for the United States from Haifa on April 17. While docked at Naples on April 23, crewmen from President Arthur got into a confrontation with members of the Blackshirts, the Italian fascist paramilitary group. Five of the Blackshirts had broken noses and black eyes; five American seamen were arrested and a further 15 Americans swam out to their steamer to avoid arrest. After calling at Halifax, the liner docked at Pier 86 in New York on March 8, carrying among its cargo 75,000 bags of onions from Alexandria, 16,000 cases of lemons from Palermo, and two cases of Jaffa oranges for philanthropist Nathan Straus. Only 500 well-wishers greeted the ship, arriving as it did on the Jewish sabbath, but President Arthur was greeted by the largest police detail in many years because of rumors of a mutiny on board the ship. Sources are unclear as to what actually happened aboard the ship, but it is known that virtually the entire crew, including the captain, was replaced before the next voyage.

On May 12 President Arthur sailed on her second voyage to Palestine, counting Hemda Ben-Yahuda, the widow of Hebrew linguist Eliezer Ben-Yehuda, among her passengers. During the trip, an altercation between a Steward and the ship's master-at-arms resulted in the death of the latter while the ship was in Naples. Though the steward was arrested by Italian authorities, he was acquitted of murder by the Assize Court at Naples. After a return to New York, President Arthur sailed for Haifa on July 19 for what would be her last voyage for American Palestine.

== Demise ==
By this time, the company, perpetually undercapitalized by its own admission, faced mounting financial troubles. On July 10, the company had to post an indemnity bond to avoid the impoundment of President Arthur for a disputed bill owed to Morse Dry Dock for the ship's 1924 refit. The following month, President Arthur was used as collateral for $100,000 loan from a Bronx bank, but it was too little, too late. American Palestine Line was placed in receivership on September 11 by federal judge Thomas D. Thacher of the U.S. District Court after suit was brought by a creditor. Eight days later, President Arthur, docked at the foot of West 34th Street, experienced a two-alarm fire in her forward cargo hold that brought out both land-based firefighters and the New York City Fire Department fireboat James Duane . In December, the line was accused of fraud in some of its prior financial dealings, charges the company denied. By the time all the legal wrangling was finished, President Arthur was back in the hands of the USSB, and the furniture and fixtures of the American Palestine offices were sold at public auction by the company's receiver in early March 1926.
