= Public Seal of Mandatory Palestine =

Public Seal of Palestine
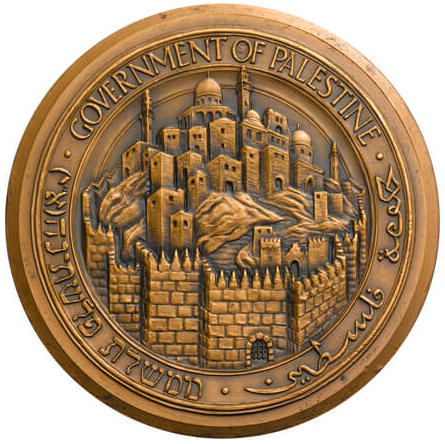
- Armiger: Mandatory Palestine
- Adopted: 12 April 1923
- Shield: Old City of Jerusalem
- Motto: Government of Palestine

The Public Seal of Palestine was a seal used when Palestine was administered by the United Kingdom as a League of Nations mandated territory. It was adopted in 1923 and fell out of use in 1948 following the establishment of the State of Israel.

== Design ==
The seal, designed by Cecil Thomas of the Royal Mint, depicted a representation of the city of Jerusalem surrounded by the words "Government of Palestine" in English, Arabic and Hebrew. The translation of the Hebrew text (ממשלת פלשתינה (א״י (Memshelet Palestína (E.Y.)), is "Government of Palestine (E.Y.)", where E.Y. stands for Eretz Yisrael. In Arabic, it read حكومة فلسطين, Ḥukūma Filasṭīn. It featured prominent landmarks from the Old City of Jerusalem including the Walls, Jaffa Gate, the Dome of the Rock and the Tower of David. It was originally proposed to use a version of the coat of arms of the historical Kingdom of Jerusalem, but this was rejected due to the focus on Christian symbols.

== Use ==
The seal was used for all legislation passed for the mandate and was to be kept by the High Commissioner. In 1932, the High Commissioner for Palestine wrote to the British Colonial Office requesting a defaced Union Jack for himself as he did not like the red ensigns used with "Palestine" as the badge. The Colonial Office agreed and proposed that he use a flag defaced with the Mandatory Palestine seal. This was objected to by the Jewish Agency for Israel, whom had not previously been aware of the seal's design.

== Other symbols ==
Civil and state vessels registered in Mandatory Palestine flew a red or blue ensign bearing a badge with the word "Palestine" on a white circular field.

In 1935 a separate badge was adopted for use on the standard of the High Commissioner. This badge depicted a crown with the words "Palestine High Commissioner" underneath.

The Official Gazette of the Government of Palestine depicted the royal arms of the United Kingdom on its front cover.

Badge of the High Commissioner for Palestine

Cover page of the Official Gazette of the Government of Palestine

Badge of the Palestine Police Force

== See also ==
- Flag of Mandatory Palestine
- Coat of Arms of Palestine
- Emblem of Israel
