= Flag of Israel =

State of Israel
- "Flag of Zion"
- Use: National flag
- Proportion: 8:11
- Adopted: 1885; 141 years ago (as flag of Rishon LeZion); August 1897; 129 years ago (by the Zionist movement); 28 October 1948; 78 years ago (by Israel)
- Relinquished: 1958; 68 years ago (as flag of Rishon LeZion)
- Design: White banner with three blue (tekhelet) symbols: a pair of horizontal tallit-like stripes above and below a centred Star of David.
- Designed by: Israel Belkind and Fanny Abramovitch
- Use: Civil ensign
- Proportion: 2:3
- Adopted: 1948; 78 years ago
- Design: Navy-blue flag with a white vertically elongated oval set near the hoist containing a vertically elongated blue Star of David.
- Use: Naval ensign
- Proportion: 2:3
- Adopted: 1948; 78 years ago
- Design: Navy-blue flag with a white triangle containing a blue Star of David at hoist.
- Use: Air force ensign
- Proportion: 2:3
- Design: Light blue flag with thin white stripes with dark blue borders near the top and bottom, displaying an air force roundel in the center.

The flag of Israel (Note: Hebrew: דֶּגֶל יִשְׂרָאֵל (deḡel Yiśrāʾēl); Arabic: عَلَم إِسْرَائِيل (ʿalam ʾIsrāʾīl).) was officially adopted on 28 October 1948. It is a white banner with three blue (tekhelet) symbols: a pair of horizontal tallit-like stripes above and below a centred Star of David. Relevant Israeli legislation describes the flag's dimensions as 160 cm (63 in) by 220 cm (87 in), thereby fixing the proportion to a ratio of 8:11. But variants can be found at a wide range of proportions, with 2:3 also common.

The symbols' colour is generically described as "dark sky-blue" and may differ from flag to flag, ranging from pure blue (sometimes shaded almost as dark as navy blue) to hues about 75% toward pure cyan and shades as light as very light blue. An early version of the flag was displayed at a procession marking the third anniversary of the founding of Rishon LeZion in 1885. A similar version was designed for the Zionist movement in 1891. The highly distinctive Star of David, which recalls the legendary Seal of Solomon, has been prominent as a widely recognized Jewish symbol since the 17th century and was formally endorsed by the First Zionist Congress in 1897.

== Origin of the flag ==
In the Middle Ages, mystical powers were attributed to the pentagram and hexagram, which were used in talismans against evil spirits. Both were called the "Seal of Solomon", but the name eventually became exclusive to the pentagram, while the hexagram became known as a symbol associated with the Israelite king David. Later, it began to appear in Jewish art. In 1648, Ferdinand II of the Holy Roman Empire permitted the Jews of Prague to fly a "Jewish flag" over their synagogue; this flag was red with a yellow Star of David in the middle.

The idea that blue and white were the national colours of the Jewish people was voiced early on by the Austrian writer and poet Ludwig August von Frankl in "Judah's Colors":

Anlegt er, wenn ihn Andacht füllt
Die Farben seines Landes;
Da steht er beim Gebet verhüllt,
Weiß schimmernden Gewandes.

Den Rand des weißen Mantels breit
Durchziehen blaue Streifen,
Sowie des Hohenpriesters Kleid
Die blauen Fädenschleifen.

Die Farben sind's des theuren Lands,
Weißblau sind Juda's Grenzen:
Weiß ist der priesterliche Glanz,
Und blau des Himmels Glänzen.

Translation:

He puts on, when prayer fills him,
The colors of his country.
There stands he, wrapped in prayer,
In a sparkling robe of white.

The hems of the white robe
Are crowned with broad stripes of blue;
Like the High Priest's robe,
The blue bands.

These are the colors of the beloved country:
Blue and white are Judah's borders;
White is the priestly radiance,
And blue, the shining of the firmament.

In 1885, the agricultural village of Rishon LeZion used a blue-and-white flag incorporating a blue Star of David, designed by Israel Belkind and Fanny Abramovitch, in a procession marking its third anniversary. In 1891, Michael Halperin, one of the founders of the agricultural village Nachalat Reuven, flew a similar blue-and-white flag with a blue hexagram and the text "נס ציונה" (Nes Ziona, "a banner for Zion": a reference to Jeremiah 4:6, later adopted as the modern name of the city). A blue-and-white flag with a Star of David and the Hebrew word "Maccabee" was used in 1891 by the Bnai Zion Educational Society. Jacob Baruch Askowith and his son Charles Askowith designed the "flag of Judah", which was displayed on 24 July 1891 at the dedication of Zion Hall of the B'nai Zion Educational Society in Boston, Massachusetts. Based on the traditional tallit, or Jewish prayer shawl, that flag was white with narrow blue stripes near the edges and bore in the center the ancient six-pointed Shield of David with the word "Maccabee" painted in blue Hebrew letters.

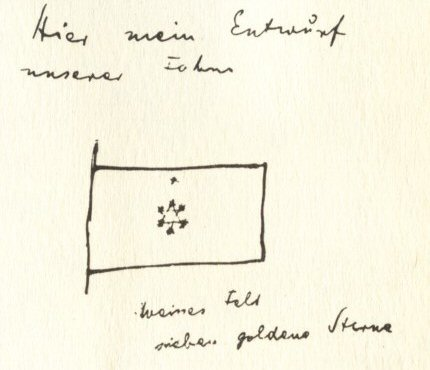
Herzl's proposed flag, as sketched in his diaries. Although he drew a Star of David, he did not describe it as such.

In Der Judenstaat (1896), Theodor Herzl writes: "We have no flag, and we need one. If we desire to lead many men, we must raise a symbol above their heads. I would suggest a white flag, with seven golden stars. The white field symbolizes our pure new life; the stars are the seven golden hours of our working-day. For we shall march into the Promised Land carrying the badge of honour." Aware that the nascent Zionist movement had no official flag, David Wolffsohn, a prominent Zionist, felt that Herzl's proposed design was not gaining significant support. But Herzl's original proposal was a flag devoid of traditional Jewish symbolism: seven golden stars was representing the 7-hour workday of the enlightened state-to-be, which would have advanced socialist legislation. In preparing for the First Zionist Congress in Basel in 1897, Wolffsohn wrote: "What flag would we hang in the Congress Hall? Then an idea struck me. We have a flag—and it is blue and white. The talith (prayer shawl) with which we wrap ourselves when we pray: that is our symbol. Let us take this Talith from its bag and unroll it before the eyes of Israel and the eyes of all nations. So I ordered a blue and white flag with the Shield of David painted upon it. That is how the national flag, that flew over Congress Hall, came into being." Morris Harris, a member of New York Hovevei Zion, used his awning shop to design a suitable banner and decorations for the reception, and his mother Lena Harris sewed the flag. The flag was made with two blue stripes and a large blue Star of David in the center, the colours blue and white chosen from the design of the tallit. The flag was ten feet by six feet—in the same proportions as the flag of the United States—and became known as the Flag of Zion. It was accepted as the official Zionist flag at the Second Zionist Congress held in Switzerland in 1898 and was flown with those of other nationalities at the World's Fair hosting the 1904 Summer Olympics from one of the buildings at the Louisiana Purchase Exposition, where large Zionist meetings were taking place. The racial Nuremberg Laws enacted by Nazi Germany in 1935 referenced the Zionist flag and stated that the Jews were forbidden to display the Reich and national flag or the German national colors but permitted to display the "Jewish colors".

In May 1948, the Provisional State Council asked the Israeli public to submit proposals for a flag, and received 164 entries. Initially the council had wished to abandon the traditional design of the Zionist flag and create something completely different, to prevent Jews around the world being charged with dual loyalty when displaying the Zionist flag, which could be seen as the flag of a foreign country. On 14 October 1948, after Zionist representatives from around the world allayed their Israeli colleagues' concerns, the flag of the Zionist Organization was adopted as the official flag of the State of Israel.

== Design ==
The Provisional Council of State Proclamation of the Flag of the State of Israel reads:

The flag is 220 cm. long and 160 cm. wide. The background is white and on it are two stripes of dark sky-blue, 25 cm. broad, over the whole length of the flag, at a distance of 15 cm. from the top and from the bottom of the flag. In the middle of the white background, between the two blue stripes and at equal distance from each stripe is a Star of David, composed of six dark sky-blue stripes, 5.5 cm. broad, which form two equilateral triangles, the bases of which are parallel to the two horizontal stripes.

Although the stripes are described as a "dark sky-blue" and the Shield of David as simply "sky-blue", the two elements of the flag are almost always the same shade.

Technical drawing of the flag - note that the length of the triangles in the Hexagram is not defined by law, only the thickness of its stripe. This drawing assumes a diameter of 69, as in the most common usage.

If the diameter is assumed to be 66 units, however, the Hexagram can be constructed off an isometric grid.

=== Colours ===
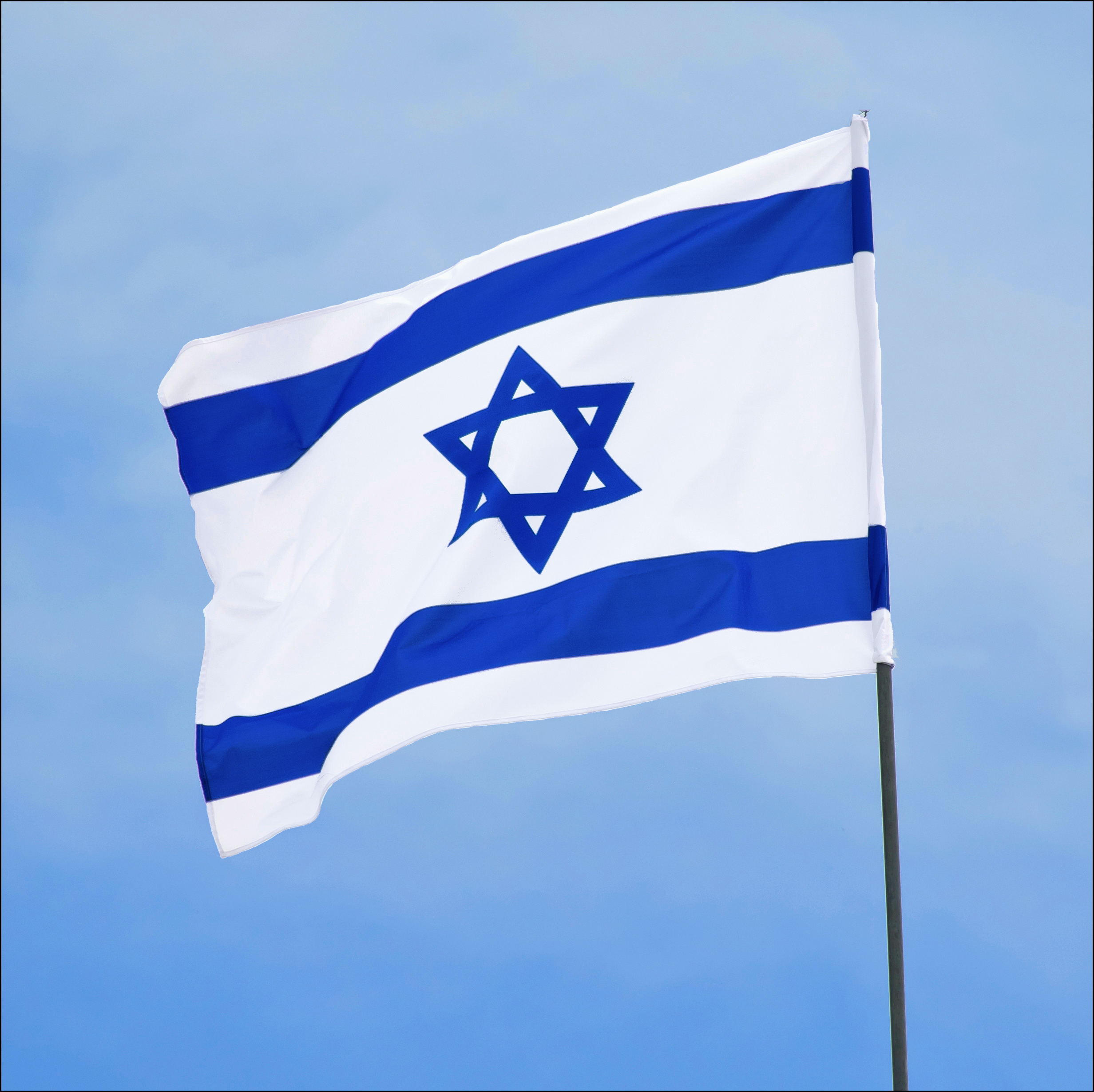
Modern photo showing the flag of Israel

In Hebrew, the blue is described as תְּכֵלֶת tḵēleṯ, which traditionally refers to a dark sky-blue dye identical to indigo—so identical in fact that supposedly only God could distinguish between them—and which was extracted from a sea creature called a חִלָּזוֹן ḥillāzōn (almost certainly the banded dye-murex, from which a dye chemically identical to indigo can be extracted). But flags with vastly differing shades of blue are commonplace, such that Israel's national colours are sometimes said to be כָּחֹל לָבָן kāḥol lāḇān ("(dark) blue (and) white") instead of תְּכֵלֶת לָבָן tḵēleṯ lāḇān ("(sky) blue (and) white").

In 1950 a decision was made to set the standard colour for government-regulated Israeli flags as "Indanthren Calidon (GCDN)", while Israeli product labels are told to use CMYK 100/70/0/28.

Colour scheme	Blue	White
Pantone	286 C	White
RGB	0/56/184	255/255/255
Hexadecimal	#0038b8	#FFFFFF
CMYK	100/70/0/28	0/0/0/0

==== Interpretation of colours ====
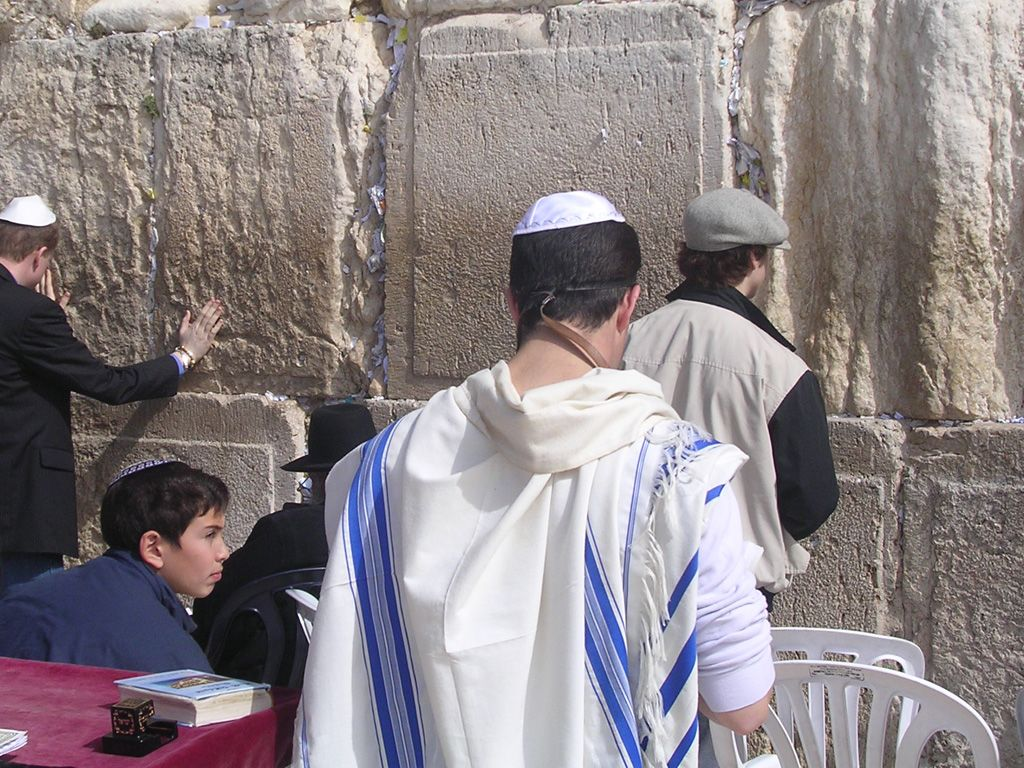
Jewish prayer shawl (tallit) with blue stripes

Scheme	Textile color
White	Ḥeseḏ (Divine Benevolence)
Blue	It symbolizes God's Glory, purity and Gḇūrā (God's severity)

The blue stripes symbolise the stripes on a tallit, the traditional Jewish prayer shawl. The Star of David is a widely acknowledged symbol of the Jewish people and Judaism. In Judaism, the colour blue symbolises God's glory, purity and gevura (God's severity). The White field represents hesed (Divine Benevolence).

In the Bible, the Israelites are commanded to have one of the threads of their tassels (tzitzit) dyed with tekhelet "so that they may look upon it, and remember all the commandments of the LORD, and do them" (Num 15:39). Tekhelet corresponds to the colour of the divine revelation (Midrash Numbers Rabbah xv.). Sometime near the end of the Talmudic era (500–600 CE) the industry that produced this dye collapsed. It became rarer; over time, the Jewish community lost the tradition of which species of shellfish produced this dye. Since Jews were then unable to fulfil this commandment, they have since left their tzitzit (tallit strings) white. But in remembrance of the commandment to use the tekhelet dye, it became common for Jews to weave blue or purple stripes into the cloth of their tallit.

== Notable flags ==
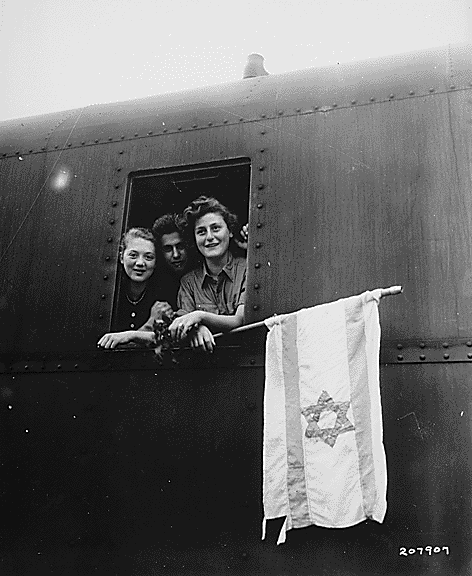
Released inmates of Buchenwald concentration camp flying a home-made flag on their way to Palestine, 1945

Flags of Israel in Jerusalem, 1948

- The "Ink Flag" of 1949, which was raised during the War of Independence near present-day Eilat. This homemade flag's raising on a pole by several Israeli soldiers was immortalized in a photograph that has been compared with the famous photograph of the United States flag being raised atop Suribachi on the island of Iwo Jima in 1945. Like the latter photograph, the Ink Flag raising has also been reproduced as a memorial.
- The Israeli flag that stayed flying throughout the siege of Fort Budapest during the Yom Kippur War, which is currently preserved in the Israeli Armored Corps memorial at Latrun. Fort Budapest was the only strongpoint along the Bar-Lev Line to remain in Israeli hands during the war.
- The 2007 World Record Flag, which was unveiled at an airfield near the historic mountain fortress of Masada. The flag, manufactured in the Philippines, measured 660 by 100 meters (2,170 ft × 330 ft) and weighed 5.2 tonnes (5.7 short tons), breaking the previous record, measured and verified by representatives for the Guinness Book of Records. It was made by Filipino entrepreneur and Evangelical Christian Grace Galindez-Gupana as a religious token and diplomatic gesture of support for Israel. In the Philippines, churches often display the Israeli flag. This record has since been surpassed several times.

== Criticism ==
The High Follow-Up Committee for Arab Citizens of Israel claims that Israel's national symbols, including its flag, constitute an official bias towards the Jewish majority that reinforces the inequality between Arabs and Jews in Israel.

Criticism from strictly Orthodox Jews stems from their opposition to early Zionism, when some went as far as banning the Star of David, originally a religious symbol, which they felt had become "defiled" after the World Zionist Organization adopted it. Similarly, contemporary leaders such as Rabbi Moses Feinstein called the Israeli flag "a foolish and meaningless object", discouraging its display in synagogues, while the Chazon Ish wrote that praying in a synagogue decorated with an Israeli flag should be avoided even if no other synagogue is nearby. The former Sephardic Chief Rabbi of Israel, Ovadia Yosef, also forbade the flying of the Israeli flag in synagogues, calling it "a reminder of the acts of the evil-doers"; Rabbi Joel Teitelbaum called the flag the "flag of heresy" and viewed it as an object of idol worship. Despite the legal requirement (since 1997) that all government-funded schools fly the Israeli flag, Haredi Jews generally refrain from displaying it at all, although in a gesture of gratitude for state funding, the Ponevezh Yeshiva raise the flag once a year on Independence Day. Some fringe groups that theologically oppose Jewish sovereignty in the Holy Land burn it on Independence Day.

=== Blue Lines ===
Yasser Arafat claimed that the two blue stripes on the Israeli flag represent the Nile and Euphrates rivers and alleged that Israel desires to eventually seize all the land in between. Such a reading is based on the Book of Genesis, which claims the two rivers are the boundaries of the Promised Land. The Hamas Covenant says, "After Palestine, the Zionists aspire to expand from the Nile to the Euphrates" and in 2006, Hamas leader Mahmoud al-Zahar issued a demand for Israel to change its flag, citing the "Nile to Euphrates" issue. The Arab writer Saqr Abu Fakhr has written that the "Nile to Euphrates" claim is a popular misconception about Jews that persists in the Arab world despite being unfounded and refuted by abundant evidence.

== See also ==
- Blue in Judaism
- List of national symbols of Israel
- Flag of the British Mandate of Palestine
- Flag of Northern Cyprus
- Karamanid flag
- List of flags of Israel
- Dance of Flags
