= SS Lituania =

SS Lituania may refer to one of two ships associated with the Russian American Line:

- SS Lituania (1889), the former East Asiatic Company ship Kina; renamed Lituania in 1907 when transferred to the Russian American Line
- SS Lituania (1915), the former Czaritsa (sometimes spelled Tsarina) for the Russian American Line; renamed Lituania when transferred to the Baltic American Line in 1921
