= SS Czar =

Ocean liner (in service 1912–1948)

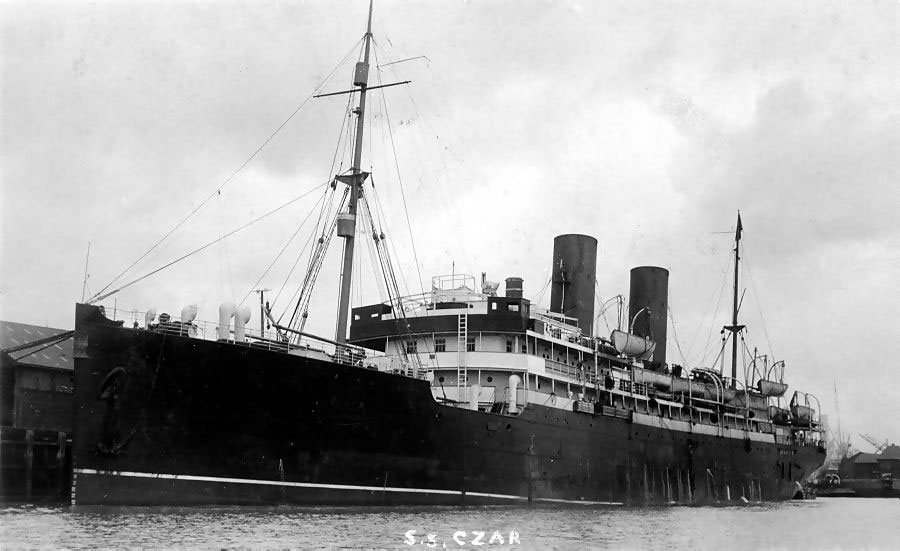
- SS Czar in port before May 1920

History
- Name: SS Czar (Царь)
- Owner: 1912–1930: East Asiatic Company; 1930–1934: PTTO; 1934–1946: Gdynia America Line; 1946–1949: Ministry of War Transport
- Operator: 1912–1917: Russian American Line; 1917: Wilson Line; 1917–1920: Cunard Line; 1920–1930: Baltic American Line; 1930–1934: PTTO; 1934–1946: Gdynia America Line; 1940: Fabre Line; 1940–1949: Lamport and Holt
- Port of registry: 1912–1917: (Russia) Libau; 1917–1920: (United Kingdom) London; 1920–1921: (Latvia) Liepāja; 1921–1930: (Denmark) Copenhagen; 1930–1946: Gdynia; 1946–1949: (United Kingdom) Liverpool
- Route: 1912–1914: Libau – New York; 1914–1917: Arkhangelsk – New York (in summer); 1914–1917: Romanov-na-Murmane – New York (in winter); 1920–1930: Liepāja – Danzig – Copenhagen – New York; 1930–1935: Danzig – New York; 1935–1939: Gdynia – Buenos Aires; 1940: Marseille–Dakar
- Builder: Barclay, Curle & Company; Glasgow, Scotland
- Yard number: 494
- Launched: 23 March 1912
- Maiden voyage: Libau – Copenhagen – New York, 30 May 1912
- Renamed: SS Estonia, January 1921; SS Pułaski, April 1930; SS Empire Penryn, 16 April 1946
- Identification: code letters PBRF (until 1933); call sign SPEC (from 1934)
- Fate: Scrapped 1949

General characteristics
- Type: Ocean liner
- Tonnage: 6,345 GRT; tonnage under deck 4,801; 3,820 NRT
- Length: 425 ft (130 m)
- Beam: 53.2 ft (16.2 m)
- Draught: 32 ft 4 in (9.86 m)
- Depth: 29.4 ft (9.0 m)
- Installed power: 889 NHP
- Propulsion: 2 × quadruple expansion steam engines; twin screws
- Speed: 15 knots (28 km/h)
- Capacity: Passengers (as built): 30 first class; 260 second class; 1,086 third class and steerage
- Troops: 2,050 troops (World War II)
- Sensors & processing systems: gyrocompass (from 1934)
- Notes: two funnels; two masts

SS Czar (Note: Царь in Russian) was an ocean liner for the then Russian American Line before World War I. In 1920–1930, the ship was named Estonia for the Baltic American Line, then named Pułaski for the PTTO (later Gdynia America Line) and as a UK Ministry of War Transport troopship, and as Empire Penryn after World War II. The liner was built in Glasgow for the Russian American Line in 1912 and sailed on North Atlantic routes from Liepāja (Libau) to New York. On one eastbound voyage in October 1913, Czar was one of ten ships that came to the aid of the burning Uranium Line steamer Volturno.

After the Russian Revolution in 1917, the ship came under the control of the UK Shipping Controller and was managed by the Wilson Line and later, the Cunard Line. Under Cunard management in 1918 as HMT (Note: In this case, HMT stands for His Majesty's Transport. For other uses as a ship prefix, see here, under the heading of "United Kingdom".) Czar, she was employed as a troopship carrying United States troops to France as part of the United States Navy's Cruiser and Transport Force. After the end of World War I, the ship was returned to the East Asiatic Company, the parent company of the Russian American Line, who placed her on their Baltic American Line sailing in roundtrip passenger service to New York under the name Estonia.

In 1930 the East Asiatic Company sold Baltic American Line to Polish owners who renamed the company Polskiego Transatlantyckiego Towarzystwa Okrętowego ("Polish Transatlantic Shipping Company Limited" or PTTO). In 1931 PTTO renamed the ship Pułaski for passenger service to North and South America. In 1934 PTTO became Gdynia – America Line.

After the outbreak of World War II Pułaski served as an Allied troopship, at first under French control and, after the Fall of France, under UK control. Pułaski sailed variously in the North Atlantic, between African ports, and in the Indian Ocean. In 1946 the ship's name was changed to Empire Penryn and she continued trooping duties under the management of Lamport and Holt. She was scrapped in 1949 at Blyth.

== Launching and early career ==
Barclay Curle & Company of Glasgow, Scotland, built Czar for the Russian American Line, a subsidiary of the Danish East Asiatic Company. Her yard number was 494. She was launched on 23 March 1912 and completed that May. Czar measured 425 feet (130 m) long by 53.2 feet (16.2 m) abeam and 34 ft 4 in (10.46 m) draught. Her tonnages were 6,345 GRT, 3,820 NRT and 4,801 under deck.

Czar had a pair of four-cylinder Barclay, Curle quadruple expansion steam engines, each of 48-inch (120 cm) stroke and with cylinders of 21 1/2-inch (55 cm), 30 3/4-inch (78 cm), 44-inch (110 cm) and 63-inch (160 cm) bore driving twin screws. Between them they developed 889 NHP, giving her a speed of 15 knots (28 km/h). The engines were fed by six 215 lb_{f}/in^{2} single-ended boilers with a total heating surface of 13,302 square feet (1,236 m^{2}). Her boilers were heated by 18 corrugated furnaces with a grate surface of 322 square feet (30 m^{2}). She had two funnels and two masts.

Czar had accommodation for 30 passengers in first class, 260 in second class, and 1,086 in third class and steerage.

Czar sailed on her maiden voyage on 30 May 1912 from Libau (present-day Liepāja, Latvia) to Copenhagen and New York, arriving in the latter city on 13 June. She replaced Lituania on the Libau – New York route, and sailed with various combinations of Kursk, Russia, Birma, and Dwinsk until July 1914.

On her 5 August 1913 sailing from Libau, Czar carried a young Mark Rothko and his family on their way to join his father in the United States; Rothko went on to become a well-known American abstract expressionist painter and printmaker. On her October 1913 eastbound crossing, Czar responded to the distress calls of the Uranium Line steamship Volturno on fire in the middle of the Atlantic The liner joined nine other ships that came to the aid of the stricken ship. Amidst stormy seas, Czar's crew rescued 102 passengers from Volturno, more than any other of the rescue ships, apart from the Grosser Kurfürst which rescued 105. In March 1914, King George V of the UK, on recommendation of the Board of Trade, awarded 19 of Czar's crew the Silver Sea Gallantry Medal, along with a £3 award each.

== World War I ==
After the outbreak of World War I in August 1914, Czar switched to service from Archangel to New York, but ran only sporadically through 1916. After the Russian Revolution, the East Asiatic Company suspended service on the Russian American Line, and transferred several ships, including Czar, to UK registry. The UK Shipping Controller initially placed the liner under the management of John Ellerman's Wilson Line, but Czar was transferred to the Cunard Line management by the end of 1917.

Now called HMT Czar, the ship, along with former Russian American Line ships Czaritza, Kursk, and Dwinsk, was attached to the Cruiser and Transport Force of the United States Navy, and made three trips carrying American troops to France. Czar sailed on her first voyage with American troops on 16 April 1918, when she departed from the Hoboken Port of Embarkation, with U.S. Navy transports Maui, Calamares, Pocahontas, El Oriente, and UK troopship HMT Czaritza. The convoy was joined by transport Mount Vernon (Note: Mount Vernon had sailed from Hoboken on 19 April 1918, three days after Czar and her group.) and was escorted by American cruiser Seattle. The convoy arrived safely in France on 28 April. Sources do not report when Czar returned to the United States, but she had done so by early June.

Czar loaded troops at Newport News, Virginia, and set out on her second US convoy crossing on 14 June, sailing with American transports Princess Matoika, Wilhelmina, Pastores, and Lenape. On the morning of 16 June, lookouts on Princess Matoika spotted a submarine and, soon after, a torpedo missed that ship by a few yards. Later that morning, the Newport News ships met up with the New York portion of the convoy—which included DeKalb, Finland, Kroonland, George Washington, Covington, Rijndam, Italian steamship Dante Alighieri, and UK troopship Vauban — and set out for France. The convoy was escorted by American cruisers North Carolina and Frederick, and destroyers Stevens and Fairfax; battleship Texas and several other destroyers joined in escort duties for the group for a time. The convoy had a false alarm when a floating barrel was mistaken for a submarine, but otherwise uneventfully arrived at Brest on the afternoon of 27 June.

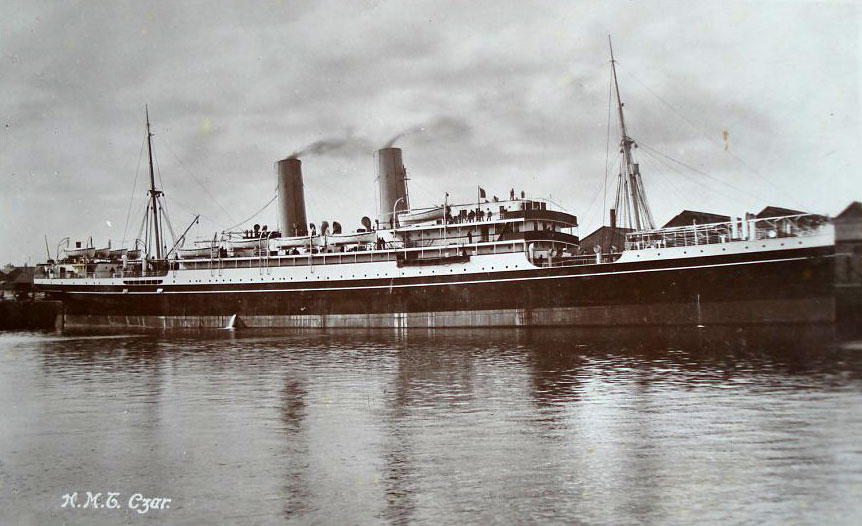
HMT Czar seen in port, c. 1917–1920

When she departed Newport News on 7 October, Czar began her last voyage ferrying American troops to France. Sailing in company with U.S. Navy transports Tenadores, Susquehanna, and America, she rendezvoused with American transport Kroonland, Italian steamship Caserta, and UK steamship Euripides out of New York. The convoy ships were escorted by cruisers Seattle and Rochester, and destroyers Murray and Fairfax. The ships arrived safely in France on 20 October.

Throughout 1919 and into 1920, HMT Czar continued carrying Commonwealth troops under Cunard management. The troopship primarily sailed between UK ports and Mediterranean ports such as Trieste, Malta, Alexandria, and Constantinople. One typical voyage from Alexandria returned 1,600 officers and men—who had been serving in Palestine, Syria, and Egypt—to Plymouth in January 1920. Czar also played a role in the North Russia Campaign of the Allied intervention in the Russian Civil War when the liner departed Hull for North Russia on 28 August 1919. HMT Czar arrived in the Tyne, from Murmansk last Friday (15 August 1919), with about 1,800 UK and Italian troops from the Syren Force North Russia. Amongst them were about 100 officers, N.C.O's and men of the 6th and 13th Battalions Yorkshire Regiment.

== Interwar civilian service ==
By late 1920 Czar had been returned to the East Asiatic Company, who placed her in service for its Baltic American Line subsidiary and renamed her Estonia. For her first Baltic American trip she sailed from Glasgow on 11 January 1921 for New York, Danzig, and Libau, arriving at the latter by mid-February. Departing from Libau on 23 February, she began a regular Libau – Danzig – Boston – New York service, sailing opposite Lituania and Polonia. (Note: Lituania and Polonia were the former Czaritza and Kursk, respectively. See: "Baltic American Line". The Ships List. 5 February 2005. Archived from the original on 21 August 2008.)

In February 1925, Estonia was reconditioned and outfitted with accommodations for 290 cabin-class and 500 third-class passengers. The following March, her accommodations were altered for 110 cabin-class, 180 tourist-class, and 500 third-class passengers. Her last voyage for the Baltic American Line began on 31 January 1930 when she sailed from Danzig to Copenhagen, Halifax, and New York. Sold to the Polish-owned PTTO (later Gdynia America Line), she sailed on 13 March for one more trip on the Danzig – New York route under the name Estonia.

Before her next voyage on 25 April 1930, she was renamed Pułaski, after Polish soldier and American Revolutionary War general Kazimierz Pułaski. As Pułaski her code letters were PBRF. When maritime call signs were given to merchant ships in 1934 she was given the call sign SPEC. Around the same time she was fitted with a gyrocompass.

SS Pułaski continued sailing the same route through August 1935, when she was moved to Gdynia – Buenos Aires service. She began her last voyage on this route on 21 April 1939.

== World War II ==
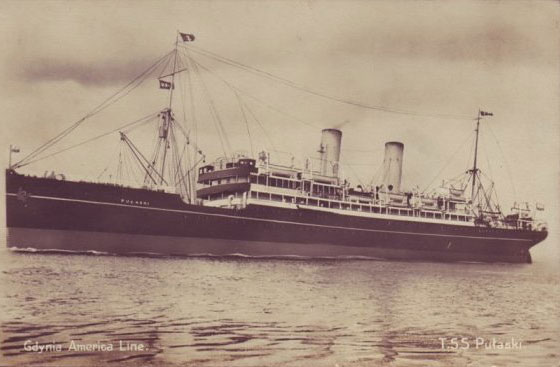
Pułaski in port circa 1930–1939

With the signing of the Anglo-Polish military alliance impending, Pułaski sailed from Gdynia to Falmouth on 24 August 1939. On 26 September, the ship left Dartmouth for Gibraltar (calling there on 2 September) and Piraeus, where she arrived on 13 October. Picking up Polish soldiers there, she sailed five days later for Marseille, where she eventually arrived on 2 December. Until March 1940, Pułaski underwent a refit in Marseille after which she sailed under charter to the French Fabre Line. At the end of the 1930s, the Fabre Line sailed ships on a Marseille–Dakar route with intermediate stops in other African ports.

On 10 March, Pułaski departed Marseille on the first of three voyages from that port. She sailed to Algiers and from there to Dakar on 13 March. Pułaski left Dakar for Freetown, Sierra Leone, and Conakry, French Guinea, returning to Dakar in early April. Sailing for Marseille on 5 April, the ship returned on 13 April as a part of convoy DF 29. Leaving again about two weeks later, she repeated the trip and returned to Marseille on 29 May as a part of convoy DF 41. By the time of her return, the German invasion of France had been underway for nearly three weeks.

Pułaski sailed on her third and final French voyage on 6 June. The liner arrived at Dakar on 15 June, and sailed the next day for Freetown, where she arrived on 18 June. Likely because of the confusion surrounding the French surrender on 22 June, Pułaski's movements over the next days are unrecorded, but she was detained at Conakry on 8 July by Vichy authorities. That evening, Pułaski's crew raised steam and sailed the ship out of the harbor in defiance of the detainment. After taking fire from shore batteries at Conakry, the ship arrived back at Freetown on 9 July.

=== UK troopship ===
On 14 August Pułaski, Kościuszko (the latest name of the former Czaritza), and Batory were chartered by the Ministry of War Transport for trooping duties and placed under the management of Lamport and Holt of Liverpool. All three ships retained their Polish crews but also carried a Lamport and Holt liaison officer aboard. Four days later, Pułaski joined convoy SL 44, the 44th wartime convoy from Sierra Leone to Liverpool, with nearly 30 other ships and 10 escorts. Pułaski and about half of the ships departed the convoy at Liverpool on 7 September, while the other half continued on for Methil.

Pułaski next made her way to the Clyde in late October. Between 10 May and 12 June 1941, she sailed on three roundtrip trooping runs between Clyde and Iceland. In late June, Pułaski, loaded with 2,047 troops, sailed from Clyde to join convoy WS 9B headed for Freetown. The convoy arrived at its destination on 13 July. After three days, Pułaski and four other ships sailed on to Cape Town, arriving on 27 July. Leaving behind one ship at Cape Town, Pułaski and the others sailed on 30 July to their final destination of Aden, where they arrived in mid August.

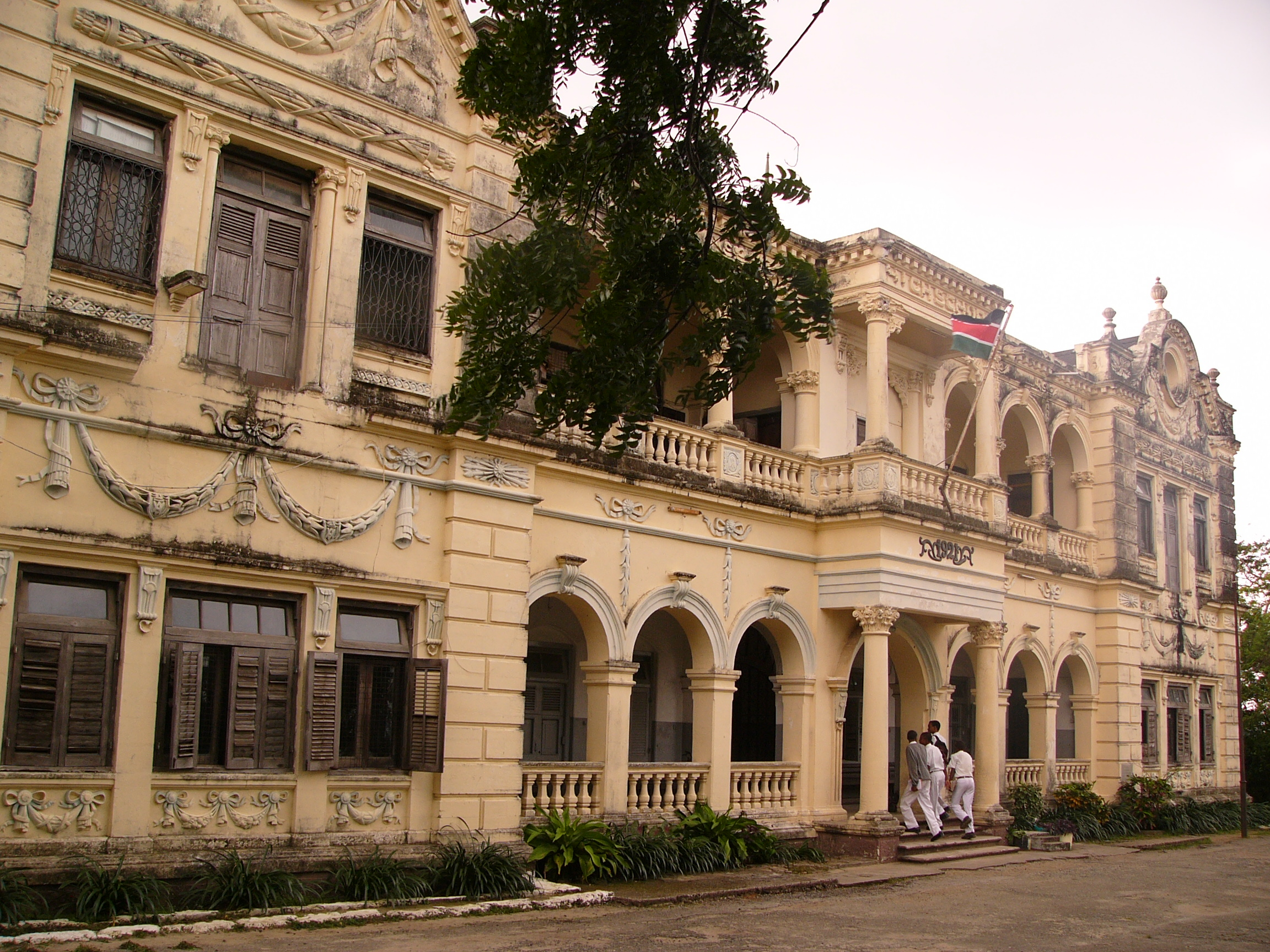
Pułaski made several stops in Kilindini, where the Royal Navy Eastern Fleet was based in 1942. The UK code-breaking operation FECB was housed in the Allidina Visram school in 1942–43 (pictured here in 2006).

Over the next seven months, Pułaski operated in the Indian Ocean, primarily sailing between Middle Eastern and East African ports. Beginning in late August, Pułaski sailed between Aden and ports of Suez, Durban, Berbera, Mombasa, Massawa, Port Sudan, and Kilindini. From Kilindini, in March 1942, the liner sailed to Colombo and back to Durban on 8 April. While at Durban, a fire gutted the bridge in what may have been sabotage.

The damaged Pułaski made her way to East London in South Africa on 11 April where she remained under repair until June. Departing East London on 25 June, she resumed her Middle Eastern and African runs between Aden, Suez, and Durban. In November, the transport departed Aden and called at Basra, Bandar Abbas, and Karachi, before returning to Durban in early December. After nearly a two-month stay at Durban, Pułaski returned to her trooping duties in the Indian Ocean on 1 February 1943. She made her first visits to Diego Suarez, Zanzibar, and Tamatave in March, and Djibouti in April.

After a return to East London from Durban on 30 May, the ship put in for another extended stay, this time for four months. Resuming her trooping runs on 29 September, Pułaski began a year of almost continuous sailing. During this span, which lasted until mid-September 1944, the ship called at Bombay twice in addition to numerous stops in Aden, Suez, Durban, and Kilindini. Putting in at Durban on 15 September, Pułaski had a general refit over the next four months.

Pułaski resumed her Indian Ocean service when she left Durban on 21 January 1945, headed for Kilindini. She visited Dar es Salaam for the first time in April, and departed from her first visit to Madras on Victory in Europe Day, 8 May 1945. Headed to Akyab, Burma, she started the first of five India–Burma roundtrips through July. Over the next months, she shuttled between Rangoon, Calcutta (where she was docked on Victory over Japan Day), Chittagong, Madras, and Colombo, arriving at the latter port for the final time on 12 September. From Colombo she sailed into the Western Pacific for Singapore where she arrived for the first of several visits on 14 September, two days after the Japanese garrison there surrendered. Through the end of 1945, Pułaski continued sailing between Singapore and India, making additional stops at Port Swettenham, Chittagong, Surabaya, and Batavia.

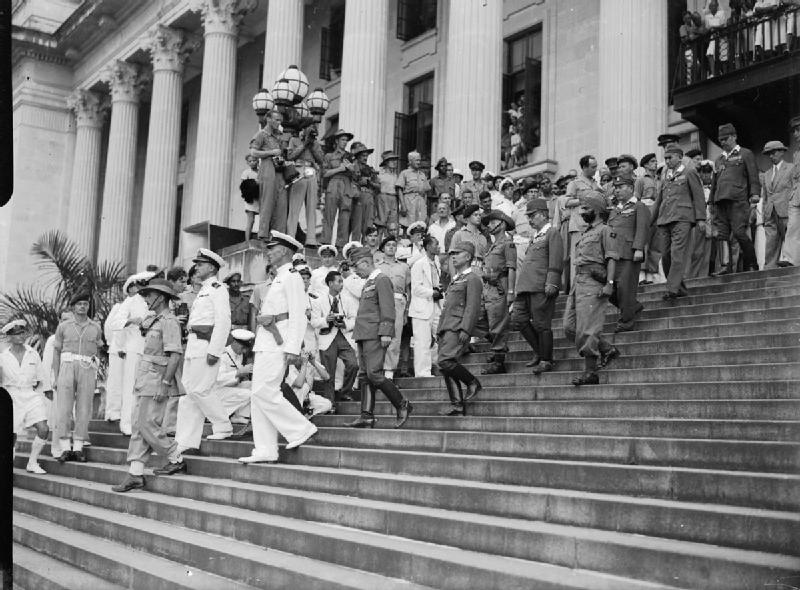
Pułaski made her first visit to Singapore two days after the Japanese garrison there surrendered on 12 September.

Pułaski arrived at Calcutta on 23 December 1945. Thereafter she continued to carry troops in the Indian Ocean, though her specific movements are not known. (Note: The ship's movements after December 1945 are not found in source materials.) In March 1946, Pułaski was purchased by the Ministry of War Transport for £100,000. It was around this time the Polish crews of Pułaski and Kościuszko refused to be repatriated to Soviet-occupied Poland. The crew members all signed UK articles.

On 16 April 1946 Pułaski was formally handed over to UK authorities, who renamed the vessel Empire Penryn. Empire followed the naming convention for UK merchant ships under MoWT ownership. Penryn was after the port of Penryn, Cornwall. Remaining under Lamport and Holt management, Empire Penryn carried troops in the Mediterranean. She was taken out of service in 1948, and on 19 February 1950 she reached Blyth, Northumberland to be scrapped.

== Bibliography ==
- Crowell, Benedict; Robert Forrest Wilson (1921). The Road to France: The Transportation of Troops and Military Supplies, 1917–1918. How America Went to War: An Account From Official Sources of the Nation's War Activities, 1917–1920. New Haven, CT: Yale University Press. OCLC 18696066.
- Cutchins, John A; George Scott Stewart Jr. (1921). History of the Twenty-ninth division, "Blue and gray", 1917–1919. Philadelphia: Press of MacCalla & Co. OCLC 3260003.
- Gibbs, CR Vernon (1970). Western Ocean Passenger Liners 1934–1969. Glasgow: Brown, Son & Ferguson.
- Gleaves, Albert (1921). A History of the Transport Service: Adventures and Experiences of United States Transports and Cruisers in the World War. New York: George H. Doran Company. OCLC 976757.
- Immigration Information Bureau (1987) [1931]. Morton Allan directory of European passenger steamship arrivals for the years 1890 to 1930 at the Port of New York and for the years 1904 to 1926 at the ports of New York, Philadelphia, Boston, and Baltimore. Baltimore, MD: Genealogical Publishing Company. ISBN 978-0-8063-0830-2. OCLC 16464579.
- Weiss, Jeffrey; Gage, John; National Gallery of Art; et al. (1998). Mark Rothko. New Haven, CT: Yale University Press. ISBN 978-0-89468-229-2. OCLC 39077075.

Media related to Pułaski (ship, 1912) at Wikimedia Commons
