= Russian American Line =

Russian American Line may refer to:

- Russian East Asiatic Steamship Company, a subsidiary to the East Asiatic Company
- Russian Volunteer Fleet, a volunteer based transport association
- Russian-American Direct Transportation Company, which served as a maritime extension of the Trans-Siberian Railway
- Russian Steam Navigation and Trading Company
