= Arundel Castle (disambiguation) =

Arundel Castle is a restored medieval castle.

Arundel Castle may also refer to:

- Arundel Castle, a Royal Canadian Air Force heliport at Victoria International Airport in British Columbia
- Arundel Castle Cricket Ground, a cricket ground in Arundel, England
- SS Arundel Castle, a number of steamships with this name
