= Dwinsk =

Dwinsk may refer to:

- Daugavpils, a city in southeastern Latvia
- SS Dwinsk, a British-flagged ocean liner sunk by in 1918
