= Atlantic Conference =

Atlantic Conference may refer to:

- Atlantic Conference (organization), an organization between international shipping companies to establish a monopoly on the North Atlantic
- Atlantic Charter, statement issued on 14 August 1941 that set out American and British goals for the world after the end of World War II
