= Yoshino Maru =

Japanese transport ship

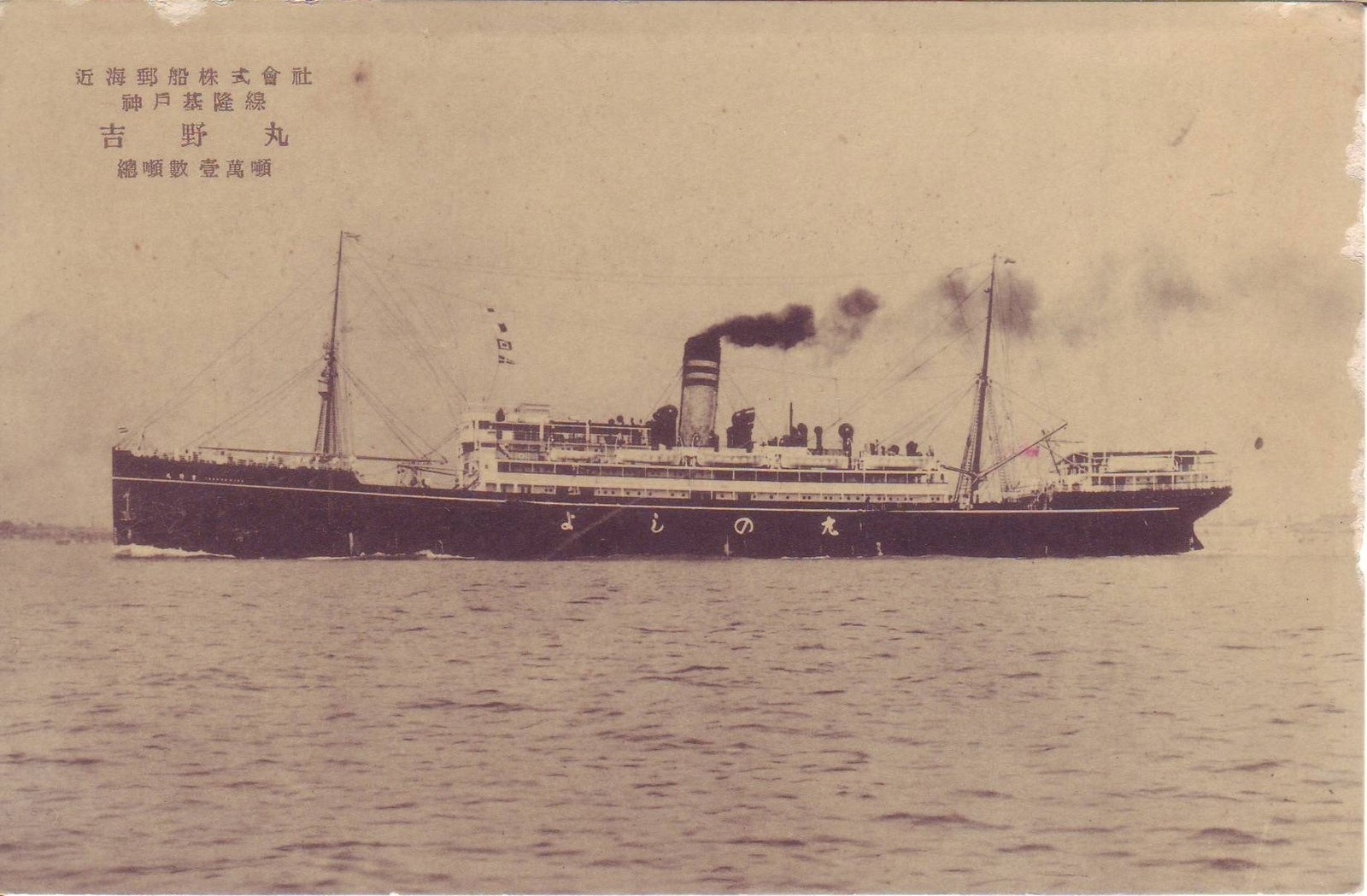

History

Germany
- Name: Kleist
- Owner: Norddeutscher Lloyd
- Builder: Schichau-Werke, Danzig
- Launched: 3 December 1906
- In service: 1907-1919
- Out of service: 1919
- Captured: in Padang 1919

Japan
- Name: Yoshino Maru
- Owner: Nippon Yusen
- In service: 1921-1944
- Out of service: 31 July 1944
- Fate: Sunk, 31 July 1944

General characteristics
- Type: Ocean liner
- Tonnage: 8,950 GRT
- Length: 141.3 m (463 ft 7 in)
- Beam: 17.5 m (57 ft 5 in)
- Depth: 11.9 m (39 ft 1 in)
- Propulsion: 2 x 4 cyl. quadruple expansion engines, dual shaft, 2 screws
- Speed: 14.5 knots (26.9 km/h; 16.7 mph)

Yoshino Maru (Kanji:吉野丸) was an 8,950-ton Japanese troop transport and hospital ship during World War II, which sank on 31 July 1944 with great loss of life.

Yoshino Maru was built in 1907 as Kleist for the Norddeutscher Lloyd by the Schichau-Werke in Danzig, Germany. Laid up for the duration of World War I at Padang, Sumatra, Netherlands East Indies. In 1919, she was taken over by the United Kingdom, who transferred her as a war reparation in 1922 to the Japanese government, where she was renamed Yoshino Maru. In 1929, she was sold to Kinkai Yusen and used as an ocean liner.

At the start of the Second Sino-Japanese War, she was chartered, later requisitioned, as a transport ship by the Imperial Japanese Navy. She began use as a hospital ship in September 1942. On 26 January 1944 40 nautical miles (74 km; 46 mi) north of Rabaul, she was bombed and suffered a near-miss by an American patrol aircraft. On 21 April 1944 Japan's Ministry of Foreign Affairs submitted a protest to the United States about the bombing of the hospital ship.

In July 1944 she became a troopship again. On 31 July 1944, she was travelling in Convoy MI-11 from Moji, Japan, to Miri, Borneo, with 5,063 soldiers on board, when the convoy was attacked by a United States Navy submarine wolfpack. At 3:40 AM, USS Parche torpedoed and sank Yoshino Maru with four torpedoes; losses aboard ship included 2,442 soldiers, as well as 18 gunners, 35 crewmen, and 400 cubic meters (14,000 ft^{3}) of ammunition.

== See also ==
- List by death toll of ships sunk by submarines
- List of maritime disasters in World War II
