= SS Kościuszko =

Scrapped passenger steamship

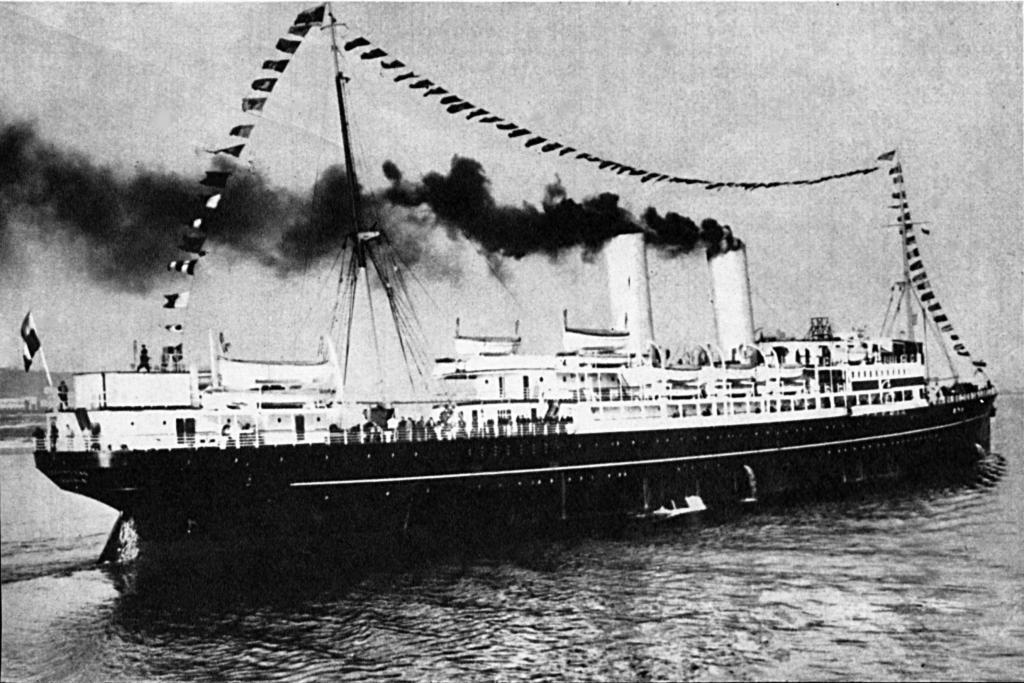
- Kościuszko entering the port of Gdynia

History

Russian Empire (1915–17) United Kingdom (1917–21) Denmark (1921–30) Poland (1930–45) United Kingdom (1945–50)
- Name: Czaritza (1915–21); Lituania (1921–30); Kościuszko (1930–39, 1939–46); ORP Gdynia (1939); Empire Helford (1946–50)
- Namesake: The Tsarina of Russia (1915–21); Lithuania (1921–30); Tadeusz Kościuszko (1930–39, 1939–46); Gdynia (1939); Helford (1946–50)
- Owner: Russian American Line (1915–17); Cunard Line (1917–21); Baltic American Line (1921–30); PTTO (1930–34); Gdynia America Line (1934–45); Ministry of War Transport (1945–46); Lamport and Holt Line (1946–50)
- Operator: Russian American Line (1915–17); Cunard Line (1917–21); Baltic American Line (1921–30); Gdynia America Line (1930–39); Polish Navy (1939); Lamport and Holt Line (1939–50)
- Port of registry: Gdynia (1930–45); London (1945–50)
- Ordered: 1914
- Builder: Barclay, Curle & Co Ltd
- Yard number: 512
- Launched: 14 February 1915
- Commissioned: 10 November 1939
- Decommissioned: 30 June 1941
- Identification: UK Official number 131432; Code letters PBRD (1930–33); Call sign SPEA (1935–45); Call sign GLSW (1945–50)
- Fate: Scrapped 1950

General characteristics
- Type: Ocean liner
- Tonnage: Until 1934: 6,522 GRT, tonnage under deck 4,846, 3,940 NRT; From 1935: 6,852 GRT, tonnage under deck: 4,843, 4,207 NRT
- Length: 440.0 ft (134 m)
- Beam: 53.4 ft (16 m)
- Draught: 32 ft (10 m)
- Depth: 29.3 ft (9 m)
- Decks: 2
- Installed power: 889 NHP
- Propulsion: 2 × 4-cylinder quadruple-expansion engines, twin screw propellers
- Speed: 14 knots (26 km/h)
- Capacity: 712 passengers
- Sensors & processing systems: Wireless direction finding (by 1938)
- Armament: 1940: 4 × 20 mm (0.79 in) Oerlikon anti-aircraft guns

Kościuszko was a passenger steamship that was built in Scotland in 1915, sailed as a troopship in both World Wars, was an ocean liner between the wars, carried displaced persons after World War II and was scrapped in England in 1950.

In her 35-year history the ship was registered in the merchant navies of the United Kingdom, Latvia and Poland. She was built as Czaritza and later bore the names Lituania, Kościuszko, Gdynia and Empire Helford. The name Kościuszko refers to Tadeusz Kościuszko (1746 – 1817), a military leader, statesman and Polish national hero.

== Construction ==
The Russian American Line ordered the ship before World War I to be an ocean liner to carry up to 1,000 passengers between New York and Arkhangelsk. Barclay, Curle & Co Ltd of Glasgow laid her keel in 1914, launched her as Czaritza on 14 February 1915 and completed her that May. Her yard number was 512.

As built, Czaritza's tonnages were 6,522 GRT and 3,940 NRT. She had twin four-cylinder quadruple-expansion engines driving twin screws. Each engine had a 48-inch (120 cm) stroke and cylinders of 21 1/2-inch (55 cm), 30 3/4-inch (78 cm), 44-inch (110 cm) and 63-inch (160 cm) bore. Between them the engines developed 889 NHP and gave her a speed of 14 knots (26 km/h). The engines were fed by six 215 lb_{f}/in^{2} single-ended boilers with a total heating surface of 13,302 square feet (1,236 m^{2}). Her boilers were heated by 18 corrugated furnaces with a grate surface of 332 square feet (31 m^{2}).

== First World War and Russian Civil War ==
She spent the remainder of the war as a troopship. She was evacuated from Russia during the Russian Civil War. Cunard Line bought her in 1917 and used her to carry troops between the US and Europe and between the UK and Malta. In 1920 she returned to Arkhangelsk, this time with the Allied expeditionary forces intervening in the Russian Civil War.

== Between the wars ==
The Russian American Line was a subsidiary of the Danish East Asiatic Company. In January 1921 the ship was transferred to another East Asiatic Company subsidiary, Baltic American Line, who renamed her Lituania. She worked various trans-oceanic routes, including a circular route Halifax – New York – Copenhagen – Danzig – Liepāja.

In 1930 the East Asiatic Company sold Baltic American Line to Polish owners who renamed the company Polskie Transatlantyckie Towarzystwo Okrętowe ("Polish Transatlantic Shipping Company Limited" or PTTO) and renamed the ship Kościuszko. On 8 June she reached Gdynia, which became her port of registry on 20 June. She was operated by Gdynia America Line, at first with a mixed Polish and Danish crew, but from 1931 her crew was entirely Polish. She served on the Gdynia – Copenhagen – Halifax route, and also made short tourist cruises.

In 1935 Kościuszko's tonnages were re-assessed as 6,852 GRT and 4,207 NRT and her old code letters were replaced with the radio call sign SPEA. By 1938 she was equipped with wireless direction finding navigation equipment.

The delivery of the modern motor ships Piłsudski in 1935 and Batory in 1936 displaced Kościuszko from transatlantic service. She started to work the Constanţa – Haifa route in 1935 and a route to South America in October 1936. The delivery of the smaller motor ships Sobieski and Chrobry in 1939 made Kościuszko surplus to requirements so early in 1939 Gdynia America Line withdrew her from service.

== World War II ==
At the outbreak of World War II the Polish Navy requisitioned Kościuszko and evacuated her to Dartmouth in the UK before the Invasion of Poland. On 10 November 1939 she was commissioned as ORP Gdynia. Initially she was a troopship, but she was considered unsuitable for service at sea and served instead as a base ship in the UK. She housed a canteen, a hospital, a Naval NCO school and several other offices. In her naval service the ship was visited by, among others, Winston Churchill and King George VI. During a German air raid on Denver, Norfolk, on 25 September, she was hit by two aerial bombs, but swift action by the crew prevented the ship from catching fire.

On 30 June 1941 she was decommissioned, restored to Gdynia America Line and reverted to her name Kościuszko. She was placed under the management of the British Lamport and Holt Line, but was crewed entirely by Poles except for a Lamport and Holt liaison officer. She served as a troopship in the Indian Ocean and Malaya. Japanese aircraft attacked her several times. In 1943 a torpedo hit her but did not explode.

She was transferred to the Mediterranean Sea and took part in the Allied Invasion of Sicily. Then she returned to the Indian Ocean, this time as a part of United Maritime Authority.

== After World War II ==
In 1945 the UK repatriated Batory to Poland but the crews of Kościuszko and another Gdynia America Line ship, Pułaski, refused to be repatriated. All crew members of both ships signed UK articles and the ships were transferred from Gdynia America Line to the UK Ministry of War Transport, who kept her under Lamport and Holt management. Kościuszko's port of registration was changed from Gdynia to London. Her call sign was changed to GLSW and she was given the UK official number 142335.

In April 1946 the MoWT renamed Kościuszko as Empire Helford and sold her to Lamport and Holt. She continued to serve as a troop transport and for transportation of displaced persons. In 1949 she was withdrawn from service, and on 2 May 1950 she reached Blyth, Northumberland to be scrapped.

== Bibliography ==
- Gibbs, CR Vernon (1970). Western Ocean Passenger Liners 1934–1969. Glasgow: Brown, Son & Ferguson.
- Heaton, Paul M (2004). Lamport & Holt Line. Abergavenny: PM Heaton Publishing. pp. 102–103. ISBN 1-872006-16-7.
