= Atlantic Conference (organization) =

- Date: 1908-1911
- Accused: Allan Steamship Company; International Mercantile Marine Company; International Navigation Company; Anchor Line; Canadian Pacific Railway Company; Cunard Line; British & North Atlantic Steam Navigation Company; Hamburg America Line; Holland America Line; North German Lloyd Company; Red Star Line; White Star Line; Russian East Asiatic Steamship Company
- Charges: Violation of the Sherman Antitrust Act

The Atlantic Conference, also known as the North Atlantic Passenger Conference, was an organization between international shipping companies to establish a monopoly on the North Atlantic. The organization was born on February 5, 1908, when thirteen companies came to an agreement to limit competition from all lines outside of the conference.

== Break up ==
On January 4, 1911, the US government under the Sherman Antitrust Act brought a lawsuit against a number of shipping companies.

It was alleged the thirteen companies entered into an illegal contract on February 5, 1908, "by which them constituted themselves the Atlantic Conference, with power to impose heavy fines on members of the conference for violation of any articles of agreement and wage competition against all lines outside of the conference." It was alleged that the conference was responsible for forcing the Russian Volunteer Fleet out of business, and that the "Russian-American Line was forced to make terms with the contract and enter its membership." The defendant companies of the lawsuit were the Allan Steamship Company, International Mercantile Marine Company, International Navigation Company, Anchor Line, Canadian Pacific Railway Company, Cunard Line, British & North Atlantic Steam Navigation Company, Hamburg America Line, Holland America Line, North German Lloyd Company, Red Star Line, White Star Line, and lastly the Russian East Asiatic Steamship Company. The lawsuit alleged the Russian American Line was, "only able to re-enter the New York service through membership in the combine, which it was forced to join at a meeting held September 1, 1909, in Cologne, Germany."

The members contracts were near expiration at the time of the trial.

== Global reaction ==
After the conference was exposed, in Russia a bill was drawn in the Duma for the purpose of fighting against the monopoly.

A bill was proposed in the United States Congress by Representative William E. Humphrey, which would bar the accused companies from American ports unless they'd desist from the Atlantic Conference. The bill proposed a penalty forcing the companies that participating in the trust be required to sell each ship adjusted to have violated the anti-trust law.

== Also see ==
- General Motors streetcar conspiracy
