= Russian East Asiatic Steamship Company =

Transport company

Russian-American Line
- Founded: 1900
- Defunct: 1917
- Successor: Baltic American Line
- Owner: East Asiatic Company

The Russian East Asiatic Steamship Company (also known simply as the Russian American Line) was a subsidiary steamship line of the East Asiatic Company that was in business from 1900 until the time of the Russian Revolution in 1917. In 1906 it began passenger service from Libau to New York after the Hamburg America Line acquired a controlling interest in the line.

After the Russian Revolution, services ended in 1917. Some of the line's ships came under control of the Cunard Line and were operated as troopships during World War I and the Allied intervention in the Russian Civil War. After the civil war most of the line's ships were sold or transferred to the Baltic American Line, another subsidiary of the East Asiatic Company.

== Background ==
A Russian-American transpacific line was first theorized in October 1893, when 22,000 Jews were expelled from Siberia creating a transportation need from Russia to America. The viability of a line began being explored in January 1894, on behalf of Amoor Steamship company of Siberia, Chicago capitalist and engineer William D. Richardson, traveled to Pacific ports, "to ascertain the port best situated for a terminus... to ply between America and Vladivostok." The project was meant to complement the Trans-Siberian Railway, and was backed by Tzar Nicholas II. A variety of ports in the United States were explored as the possible American terminus, including San Diego.

It was planned that the ships for the new line would be carrying the mail for the Russian government, and would be doing a general carrying business for a period of 15-years. The official name of the company was revealed in May 1894, to be the Russian-American Direct Transportation Company. Investors with a controlling interest in the Santa Fe Railway joined the project, working towards the goal of connecting "...German-Austrian and Russian goods..." to the American market. As the same time, Union Iron Works was announced to be constructing several new ships for the line. Unfortunately, the line never came to fruition, possibly due to the failure of the Trans-Siberian Railroad.

Competition to the announced plan was almost immediate, the United Steamship Company was launched in Copenhagen in 1898 to run between Baltic ports and New York. In 1902, an Italian company began negotiating with the committee of the Russian Volunteer Fleet to open a new line between the Black Sea and North America via Italy. The Russian Volunteer Fleet began sailing to New York carrying immigrants in November 1903.

In 1905, plans were revisited in Saint Petersburg for a state-sponsored Russian-American Line which would be governed by the Russian Department of Merchant Marines, led by Grand Duke Alexander Mikhailovich. Later in 1905, it was decided to merge the Department of Merchant Marines with the newly created Ministry of Commerce.

The Hamburg-American Line, in July 1906 intended to start offering a service from Libau in direct competition with the Russian Volunteer Fleet. The announcement was received poorly, as Russia didn't want competition for the Russian Volunteer Fleet.

== History ==
In May 1909, seven blind men, and a blind woman, stowed away on the Lithunia when it departed from Libau, Russia.

In June 1909, four men that attempted to assassinate Czar Nicholas II, escaped to the United States aboard the Russian-American Line ship Russia. The men, Ivan Maslennikoff, Constantine Grueff, Fedor Kasiniroff, and Ivan Worinkin, were all recent graduates of University of Moscow. Max Straus, a representative for the Russian-American Line clarified all the men were afflicted with trachoma and would bar them from being permitted to stay in the United States anyway. Two of the men were returned to Russia when the ship departed on June 5, the other two, Grueff and Kasiniroff were held at Ellis Island.

On November 12, 1910, the new ship Kursk arrived in New York in 10 1/5 days.

In January 1911, it was reported the company was having a "gasoline-driven" vessel built by Barclay Curle.

== Lawsuits ==
On January 4, 1911, the US government under the Sherman Antitrust Act brought a lawsuit against a number of shipping companies. It was alleged the thirteen companies entered into an illegal contract on February 5, 1908, "by which they constituted themselves the Atlantic Conference, with power to impose heavy fines on members of the conference for violation of any articles of agreement and wage competition against all lines outside of the conference." It was alleged that the conference was responsible for forcing the Russian Volunteer Fleet out of business, and that the "Russian-American Line was forced to make terms with the contract and enter its membership." The defendant companies of the lawsuit were the Allan Steamship Company, International Mercantile Marine Company, International Navigation Company, Anchor Line, Canadian Pacific Railway Company, Cunard Line, British & North Atlantic Steam Navigation Company, Hamburg America Line, Holland America Line, North German Lloyd Company, Red Star Line, White Star Line, and lastly the Russian East Asiatic Steamship Company. The lawsuit alleged the Russian-American Line was, "only able to re-enter the New York service through membership in the combine, which it was forced to join at a meeting held September 1, 1909, in Cologne, Germany."

== Ships of the Russian American Line ==
- SS Arconia (1896)
- SS Birma (1894)
- SS Czar (1912)
- SS Czaritza (1915)
- SS Dwinsk (1897)
- SS Estonia (1889) p. 85
- SS Grodno (1893)
- SS Korea (1899)
- SS Kowno (1892)
- SS Kursk (1910)
- SS Lituania (1889)
- SS Livonia (1902)
- SS Russia (1908)
