= SS Arundel Castle =

A number of steamships have been named Arundel Castle, including:

- SS Arundel Castle (1864), in service 1864–1983
- SS Arundel Castle (1894), in service 1895–1905
- RMS Arundel Castle, in service 1921–1958
