= SS Polonia =

1910 passenger steamship

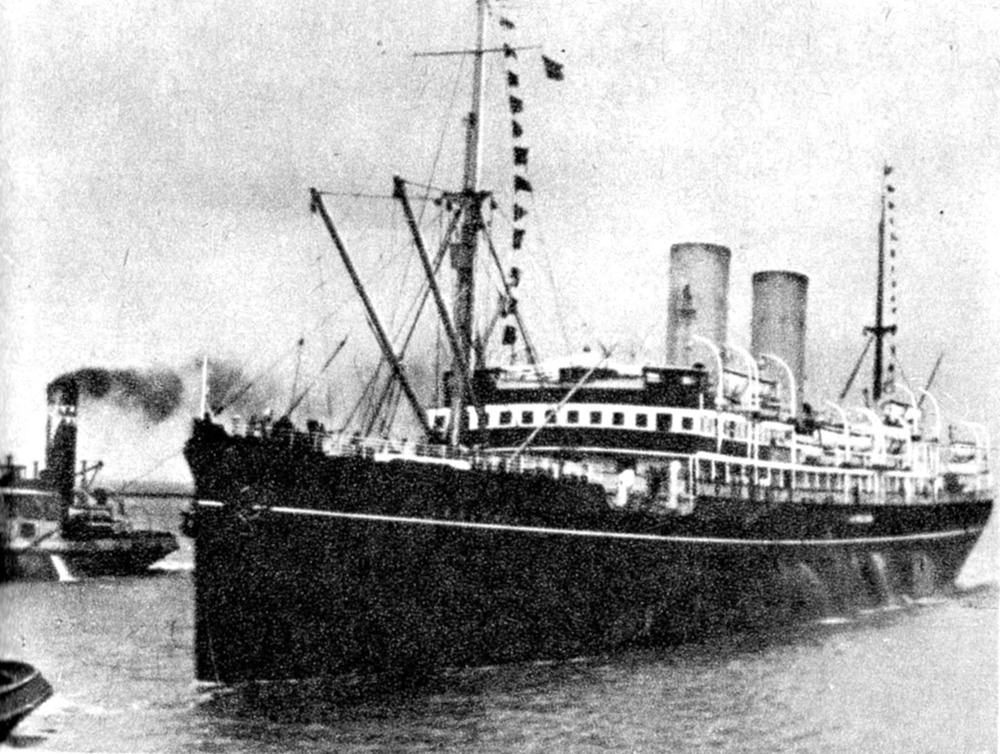
- Polonia entering the port of Gdynia in 1930

History
- Name: Kursk (1910–21); Polonia (1921–39)
- Namesake: Kursk (1910–21); Poland (1921–39)
- Owner: Russian American Line (1910–17); Baltic American Line (1920-30); PTTO (1930–34); Gdynia America Line (1934–39)
- Operator: Russian American Line (1910–17); Cunard Line (1917–18); Shipping Controller (1918–20); Baltic American Line (1920-30); Gdynia America Line (1930–39)
- Port of registry: Liepāja (1910–30); Gdynia (1930–39)
- Builder: Barclay, Curle & Co Ltd
- Yard number: 482
- Launched: 7 July 1910
- Completed: September 1910
- Out of service: 1939
- Identification: UK official number 142313 (1917–20); code letters NDCV (until 1930); code letters PBRC (1930–33); call sign SPEB (1934–39)
- Fate: Scrapped 1939

General characteristics
- Type: Ocean liner
- Tonnage: 7,500 GRT tonnage under deck 5,896 4,519 NRT
- Length: 450.0 ft (137.2 m)
- Beam: 56.2 ft (17.1 m)
- Draught: 34 ft 0 in (10.36 m)
- Depth: 31.3 ft (9.5 m)
- Installed power: 1,020 NHP
- Capacity: 1,596 passengers
- Sensors & processing systems: wireless direction finding; gyrocompass; submarine signalling

Polonia was a passenger steamship that was built in Scotland in 1910, originally named Kursk and was registered in the Russian Empire. She was an Allied troopship in the First World War, when she was briefly operated by Cunard Line. After the war she returned to civilian passenger service, in Latvian service until 1930 and then for Poland.

== Building ==
The Danish East Asiatic Company ordered the ship from Barclay, Curle & Co Ltd of Glasgow. She was built as yard number 482, launched on 7 July 1910 and completed that September. She was launched as Kursk, named after the city of Kursk in western Russia.

Kursk was 450.0 ft (137.2 m) long, her beam was 56.2 ft (17.1 m) and her draught was 34 ft 0 in (10.36 m). Her tonnages were 7,500 GRT and 4,519 NRT.

The ship had twin four-cylinder quadruple-expansion engines driving twin screws. Each engine had a 48-inch (120 cm) stroke and cylinders of 23 1/4-inch (59 cm), 33-inch (84 cm), 47-inch (120 cm) and 68-inch (170 cm) bore. Between them, the engines developed 1,020 NHP. The engines were fed by six 215 lb_{f}/in^{2} single-ended boilers with a total heating surface of 15,114 square feet (1,404 m^{2}). Her boilers were heated by 18 corrugated furnaces with a grate surface of 363 square feet (34 m^{2}).

== Service ==
The East Asiatic Company registered Kursk in Liepāja in the Russian Empire. After the October Revolution, the UK Shipping Controller chartered her and placed her under Cunard Line management. In 1920, she was returned to the East Asiatic Company. Kursk was renamed Polonia, the Latin name for Poland.

In 1930, the East Asiatic Company sold its Latvian subsidiary to Polish owners, who renamed the company Polskiego Transatlantyckiego Towarzystwa Okrętowego ("Polish Transatlantic Shipping Company Limited" or PTTO). The ships were operated by Gdynia America Line, which was restructured in 1934 to absorb PTTO.

In 1933, Polonia inaugurated the Polish-Palestine Line of the Polish Transatlantic Shipping Company between Constanța and Haifa.

Gdynia America Line rapidly modernised, taking delivery of the new motor ships Piłsudski in 1935 and Batory in 1936 for its premier transatlantic service. The company sold Polonia to Francesco Pittaluga in Savona, Italy for scrap on 5 March 1939, a few months before two more new motor ships, Sobieski and Chrobry, joined the company fleet.

== Bibliography ==
- Gibbs, CR Vernon (1970). Western Ocean Passenger Liners 1934–1969. Glasgow: Brown, Son & Ferguson.
