= Gdynia America Line =

Gdynia-America Shipping Lines, Limited.
- House flag
- Company type: Spółka akcyjna
- Founded: 1930 (as Polish Transatlantic Shipping Company Limited)
- Defunct: 2 January 1951
- Fate: Merged with Polish-British Shipping Partnership and Żegluga Polska, 1951
- Successor: Polish Ocean Lines
- Headquarters: Gdynia, Poland

Gdynia-America Shipping Lines S.A. (Gdynia America Line - GAL) was a Polish-Danish joint stock company based in Gdynia, established in 1930 under the name of the Polish Transatlantic Shipping Company Limited (PTTO) in order to mark the Polish presence on the Atlantic; in 1934 transformed into Gdynia-America Shipping Lines.

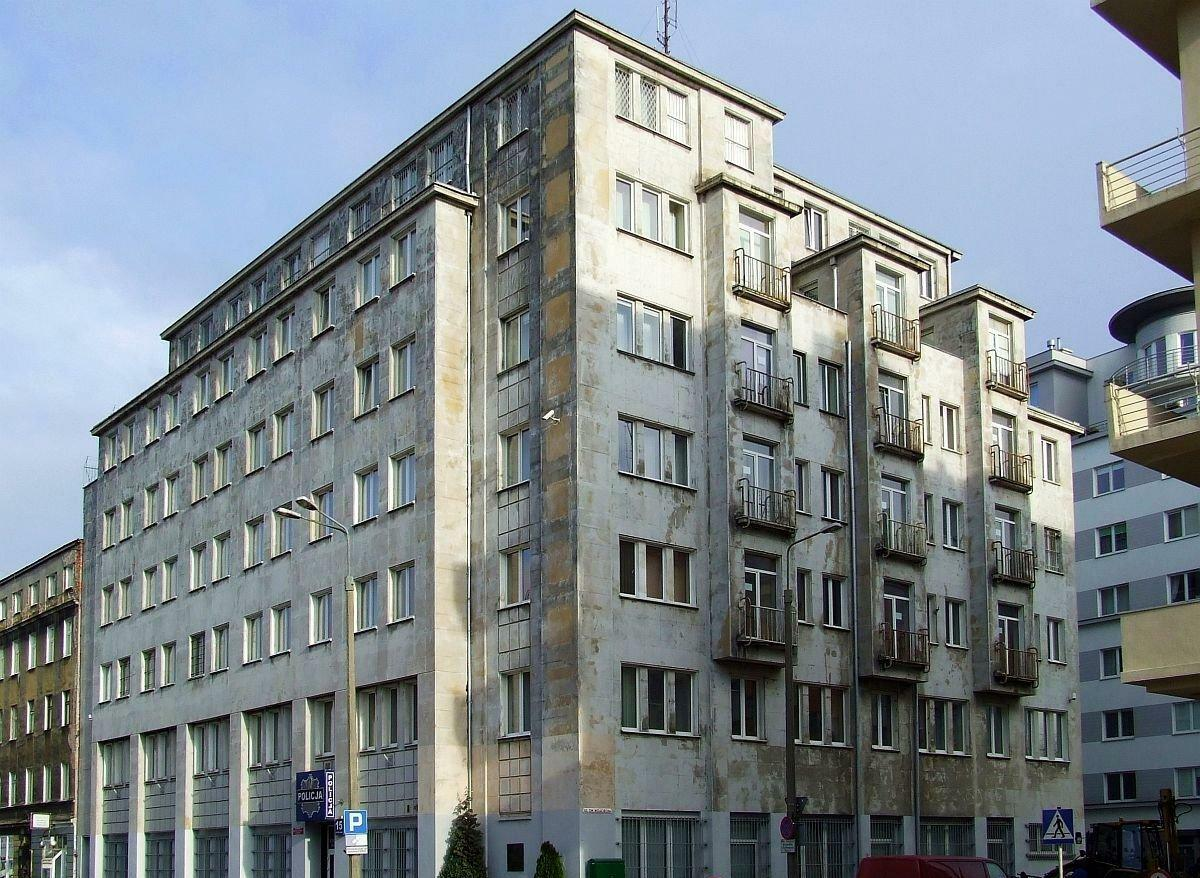
Building of Gdynia-America Line headquarters from 1946 to 1951 seen today

== Origins ==
In 1930 the Polish government, faced with growing emigration to North and South America, decided to purchase an existing shipping line (including ships and existing organizational apparatus) with the right to use piers in New York. After the failure of negotiations with Germany, the Baltic American Line owned by the Danish shipping company, the East Asiatic Company Limited (EAC, Det Ostasiatitske Kompagni) in Copenhagen was chosen. This line had three steam passenger ships named Polonia (ex-Kursk, built 1910), Estonia (ex-Czar, built 1912) and Lithuania (ex-Czaritza, built 1915) which were registered in Latvia.

== Sale to Poland ==
The Danish owners became eager to sell their interests, as in 1931 the United States authorities severely reduced immigrant quotas and the line was threatened with bankruptcy. The Polish owners renamed the company Polskie Transatlantyckie Towarzystwo Okrętowe (Polish Transatlantic Shipping Company Limited or PTTO). Initially captains were provided by the Danish side, and Polish captains acted as doubles, preparing for independent command of the ships.

The ships were operated by Gdynia America Line, which was restructured in 1934 to absorb PTTO.

== Evolution ==
The line added routes, particularly to South America, with its River Plate Service.

== Fate ==
House flag used by GAL after World War II

The company was badly affected by World War II with many of its ships, being seized for war service and/or lost. In 1950 the company (and its few remaining ships) were folded into the state-owned Polish Ocean Lines. After the end of World War II, the Danish Ministry of Foreign Affairs submitted a nationalization claim, with regards to the GAL nationalization, to the Polish authorities during bilateral trade negotiations. Ultimately, the claim was satisfied as part of the Polish-Danish compensation agreement signed on 26 February 1953. Det Østasiatiske Kompagni A/S was granted a compensation in the amount of 1,220,000 Danish kronas (DKK).
