= Baltic American Line =

Shipping company

- Founded: 1920
- Defunct: 1930
- Fate: Merged
- Successor: Polish Transatlantic Shipping Company Limited or PTTO
- Headquarters: Liepāja, Latvia
- Owner: East Asiatic Company

The Baltic American Line, was a shipping company, established by the Danish East Asiatic Company in 1920.

== Origins ==
The East Asiatic Company's subsidiary Russian American Line began sailing to North America in 1900, continuing until 1917.

With the Russian revolution, Poland and the Baltic states had seceded from Russia and the city of Liepāja (Libau) was in newly independent Latvia. The ships were transferred to the newly created Baltic American Line. The East Asiatic Company's Liepāja-registered ships all had Russian names, so the company renamed them with the names of the newly independent states: Latvia (ex-Russija, built 1908), Polonia (ex-Kursk, built 1910), Estonia (ex-Czar, built 1912) and Lithuania (ex-Czaritza, built 1915).

The Latvia was sold in 1923 to a Japanese shipping company and renamed the Fuso Maru; she was later torpedoed during World War II.

The Baltic America Line offered passenger service between the ports of New York, Hamburg, Danzig, Liepāja and Halifax. They offered intermediate class accommodations for First Class, Cabin, Tourist and Third Class passengers.

The ships continued the service under the Danish flag from 1921 to 1930.

== Sale to Poland ==
The Danish owners became eager to sell their interests as in 1931 the United States authorities severely reduced immigrant quotas and the line was threatened with bankruptcy.

In 1930 the East Asiatic Company sold its Latvian subsidiary, with the remaining three ships, to Polish owners who renamed the company Polskie Transatlantyckie Towarzystwo Okrętowe (Polish Transatlantic Shipping Company Limited or PTTO). The ships were operated by Gdynia America Line, which was restructured in 1934 to absorb PTTO.

Initially captains were provided by the Danish side, and Polish captains acted as doubles, preparing for independent command of the ships.

== Fleet ==
- Latvia (ex-Russija, built 1908, later Fuso Maru)
- Polonia (ex-Kursk, built 1910)
- Estonia (ex-Czar, built 1912)
- Lithuania (ex-Czaritza, built 1915)
