= Fuso Maru =

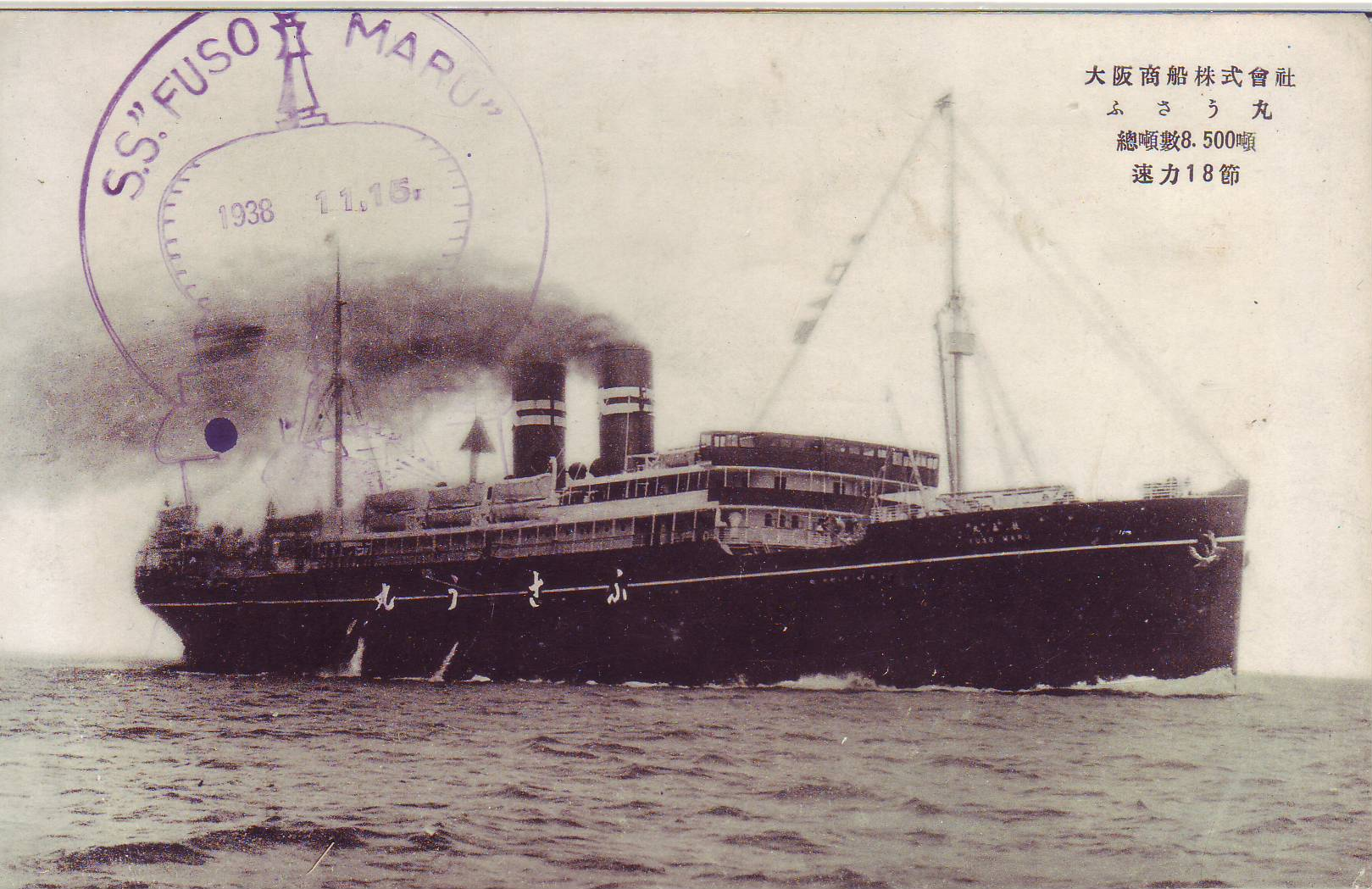
- Postcard of the Mitsui O.S.K. Lines ship Fuso Maru

History
- Name: (Russian Empire) SS Russia (1908-1914); (Russian Empire) Russija (1914–1918); (Denmark) Russ (1918–1921); Latvia (1921–1923); (Empire of Japan) Fuso Maru (1923–1944)
- Owner: Osaka Shosen K. K. - OSK Line
- Port of registry: (Empire of Japan) Osaka, Japan
- Route: Libau ~ New York, United States; (1909-1914); Libau ~ Danzig ~ Halifax ~ New York (1921-1923); Kobe, Japan ~ Kirun, Formosa; (1924-1934); Kobe, Japan ~ Dairen, Manchukuo (1934-1941)
- Builder: Barcay Curle Co. Ltd.
- Yard number: 470
- Laid down: 1907
- Launched: 19 March 1908
- Completed: February 1909
- Maiden voyage: 2 June 1909
- Fate: Sunk, 31 July 1944

General characteristics
- Type: Ocean liner
- Tonnage: 8,596 GRT
- Length: 144.78 metres (475 ft 0 in)
- Beam: 17.53 metres (57 ft 6 in)
- Depth: 11.2 metres (36 ft 9 in)
- Installed power: 2 triple expansion steam engines
- Propulsion: Double screw propeller
- Speed: 16 knots (30 km/h; 18 mph)
- Capacity: 1,724
- Crew: 144

SS Fuso Maru was a Japanese ocean liner that was torpedoed by the United States Navy submarine USS Steelhead in the South China Sea 280 nautical miles (520 km) northwest of Cape Mayraira, Luzon, the Philippines, at (18°51′N 122°55′E), while she was travelling in Convoy MI-11 from Moji, Japan, to Miri, Borneo.

== Construction ==
Fuso Maru was laid down in 1907 at the Barcay Curle Co. Ltd. shipyard in Glasgow, Scotland, United Kingdom. She was launched on 19 March 1908 and was completed in February 1909. She was built for the Russian East Asiatic Steamship Company and was named Russia. She was renamed Fuso Maru when she was bought by the Japanese company Osaka Shosen K. K. - OSK Line on 24 December 1923.

Fuso Maru was 144.78 metres (475 ft 0 in) long, with a beam of 17.53 metres (57 ft 6 in) and a depth of 11.2 metres (36 ft 9 in). The ship was assessed at 8,596 GRT. She had two triple expansion steam engines rated at 7,113 indicated horsepower (5,304 kW) and driving two screws. She had two funnels and four masts.

== Pre-World War II career ==
As Russia, the ship completed her maiden voyage from Libau, Russia, to New York City, United States, on 2 June 1909, and her last voyage on 26 June 1914. She was then laid up at Kronstadt, Russia, until 1917, when she was renamed Rossija and later Russ. As Russ, at the end of the First World War, she operated as a Danish hospital ship, and was used to repatriate British troops and civilians held as prisoners of war in Germany. This included a sailing from Danzig to Leith, Scotland, via Copenhagen and arriving on 1 December 1918.

In 1921 she was transferred to the Baltic American Line and renamed Latvia. She started service on the Libau–Danzig–Halifax–New York City route on 11 July 1921. Her ninth and last transatlantic voyage started on 7 February 1923. She then was sold to Osaka Shosen Kaisha of Japan on 24 December 1923 and renamed Fuso Maru. Two of her masts were removed at this time. Fuso Maru then served two different companies under four different names before finally being purchased by the Japanese Company Osaka Shosen K. K. - OSK Line.

Fuso Maru operated on the Kobe, Japan–Kirun, Taiwan route from 18 July 1924 until March 1934. She then provided service on the Kobe–Dairen, Manchukuo, route from March 1934 until November 1941. She had accommodation for 42 first-class, 56 second-class, 212 third-class, and 1,414 fourth-class passengers, and had a crew of 144.

== World War II career ==
In November 1941, the Imperial Japanese Army charted Fuso Maru for use as a troopship. She was most likely painted grey overall and armed with a suite of antiaircraft guns at this time.

Fuso Maru participated as a troopship in Operation "E", the Japanese invasion of Malaya beginning on 13 December 1941. In late December 1941, she was rerated as a hospital ship. She was most likely disarmed because of the international prohibition against hospital ships carrying armament, and she was painted white with a green horizontal strip and red crosses on her sides and funnel.

Shortly after sunrise on 15 April 1943, Allied aircraft attacked Fuso Maru three times near the Shortland Islands near (03°33′S 152°20′E). Fuso Maru returned to service as a troopship later in 1943 and was repainted overall grey and again armed with antiaircraft guns.

== Sinking ==
On 31 July 1944 Fuso Maru was part of Convoy MI-11, which consisted of 23 ships, including the tankers Koei Maru, Taketoyo Maru, Shichiyo Maru, Ayagumo Maru, Harima Maru, and Ogura Maru No. 1 and the cargo ships and troopships Fuso Maru, Ayayuki Maru, Yoshino Maru, Miho Maru, Enoshima Maru, Manko Maru, Hachijin Maru, Dakar Maru, Teiritsu Maru, Fukuju Maru, and Banshu Maru No. 16, escorted by the destroyer Shiokaze, the escort ship Shimushu, the minesweepers W-38 and W-39, the submarine chaser CH-55, and the auxiliary gunboat Kazan Maru. The convoy was attacked in the South China Sea 280 nautical miles (520 km) northwest of Cape Mayraira, Luzon, while it was proceeding from Moji, Japan to Miri, Borneo, by a United States Navy submarine wolfpack patrolling the Luzon Strait. The wolfpack consisted of USS Parche, USS Steelhead, and USS Hammerhead.

At 3:32 AM, Parche torpedoed and sank Koei Maru with four torpedoes. Although she was carrying a unit of 1,050 Imperial Japanese Army troops, the casualties aboard her were relatively light; about 150 troops and nine crewmen were killed. About the same time, tanker Ogura Maru No. 1 was hit by two torpedoes, killing five men, but she did not sink. At 3:40 AM, Parche torpedoed and sank Yoshino Maru with four torpedoes; she carried down 2,442 of the 5,063 Imperial Japanese Army troops she was carrying, as well as 18 gunners, 35 crewmen, and 400 cubic metres (14,000 cu ft) of ammunition. At 4:20 AM, Steelhead hit Dakar Maru with two torpedoes, killing six men, but Dakar Maru did not sink and quickly beached herself.

Aboard Fuso Maru, 40 men were assigned to duty as lookouts, including Imperial Japanese Army artillerymen and infantrymen. At 4:55 AM, one lookout spotted a torpedo approaching the ship and her captain ordered her rudder turned hard to port, but it was too late. Steelhead's torpedo hit Fuso Maru's engine room on the port side of the ship. Fuso Maru bucked and trembled from the explosion and the blast blew upwards, destroying several lifeboats that were on deck. Fuso Maru took on a 25-degree list to port in heavy seas when the order to abandon ship was issued. The ground vehicles carried as deck cargo broke loose and fell onto men swimming in the water.

At 5:10 AM, Fuso Maru sank only 15 minutes after the torpedo hit, taking down 1,316 of 4,500 troops aboard. Seventy men of the 2nd Company, Sixth Aviation Signal Regiment, 12 other passengers, and 22 crew members also perished, bringing the death toll to 1,384 people. A cargo consisting of food and medical supplies, oil, trucks, 36 railway carriages, and 1,120-tons of other military supplies also was lost.

At 5:14 AM, Parche torpedoed and sank Manko Maru. She carried several hundred Imperial Japanese Navy personnel, 17 crewmen, about 20 gunners, and a cargo of ammunition down with her. Altogether, four of the 23 ships of Convoy MI-11 sank and two were damaged. The ships took down several thousand military personnel, gunners, and crewmen, as well as their cargoes of ammunition and other supplies. Thousands of troops were left floating in the waters of the Balintang Channel.

== Wreck ==
The wreck of Fuso Maru lies at (18°51′N 122°55′E).

== Gallery ==
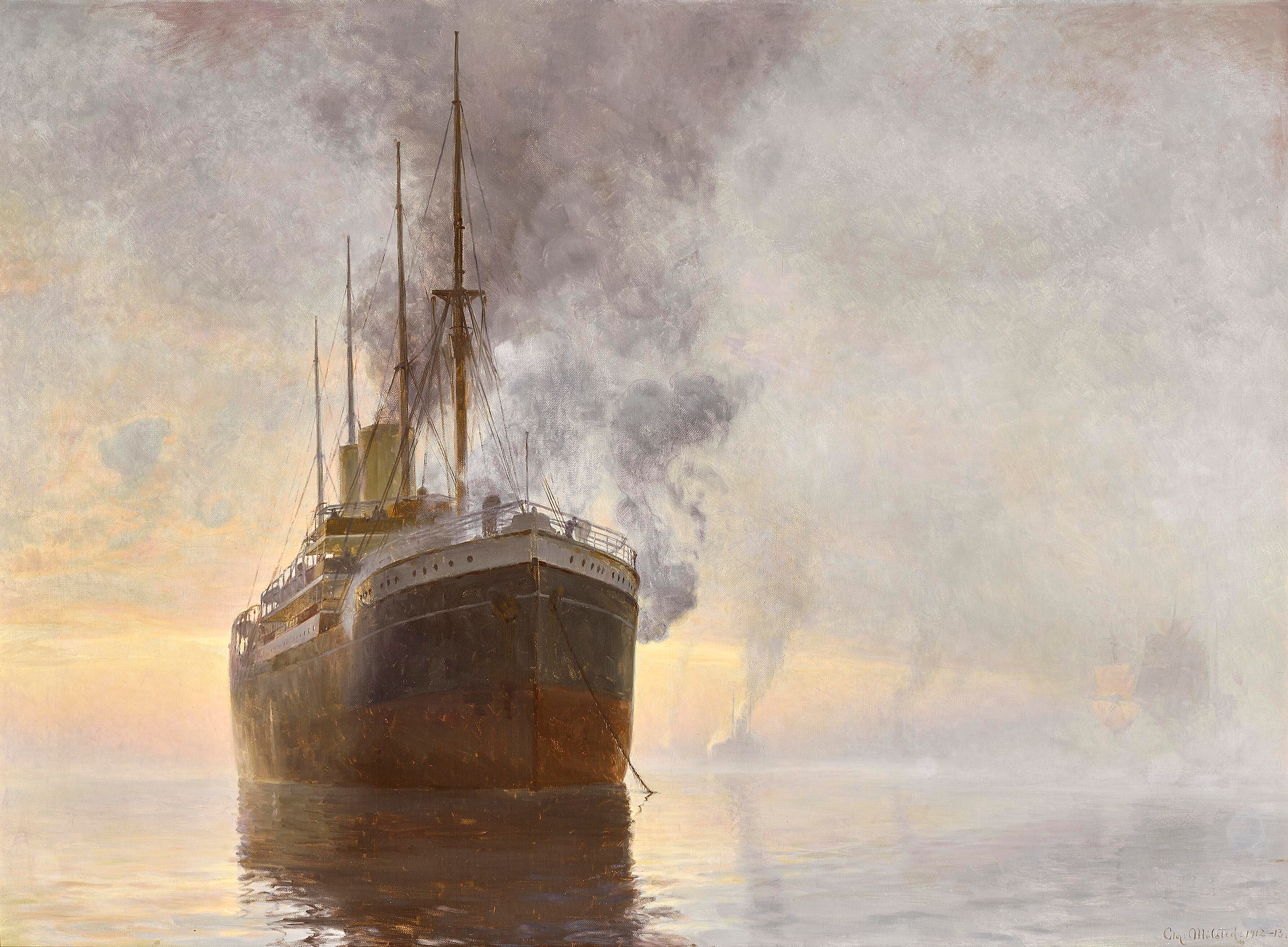
SS Russia near Copenhagen, painted by Christian Mølsted in 1913.

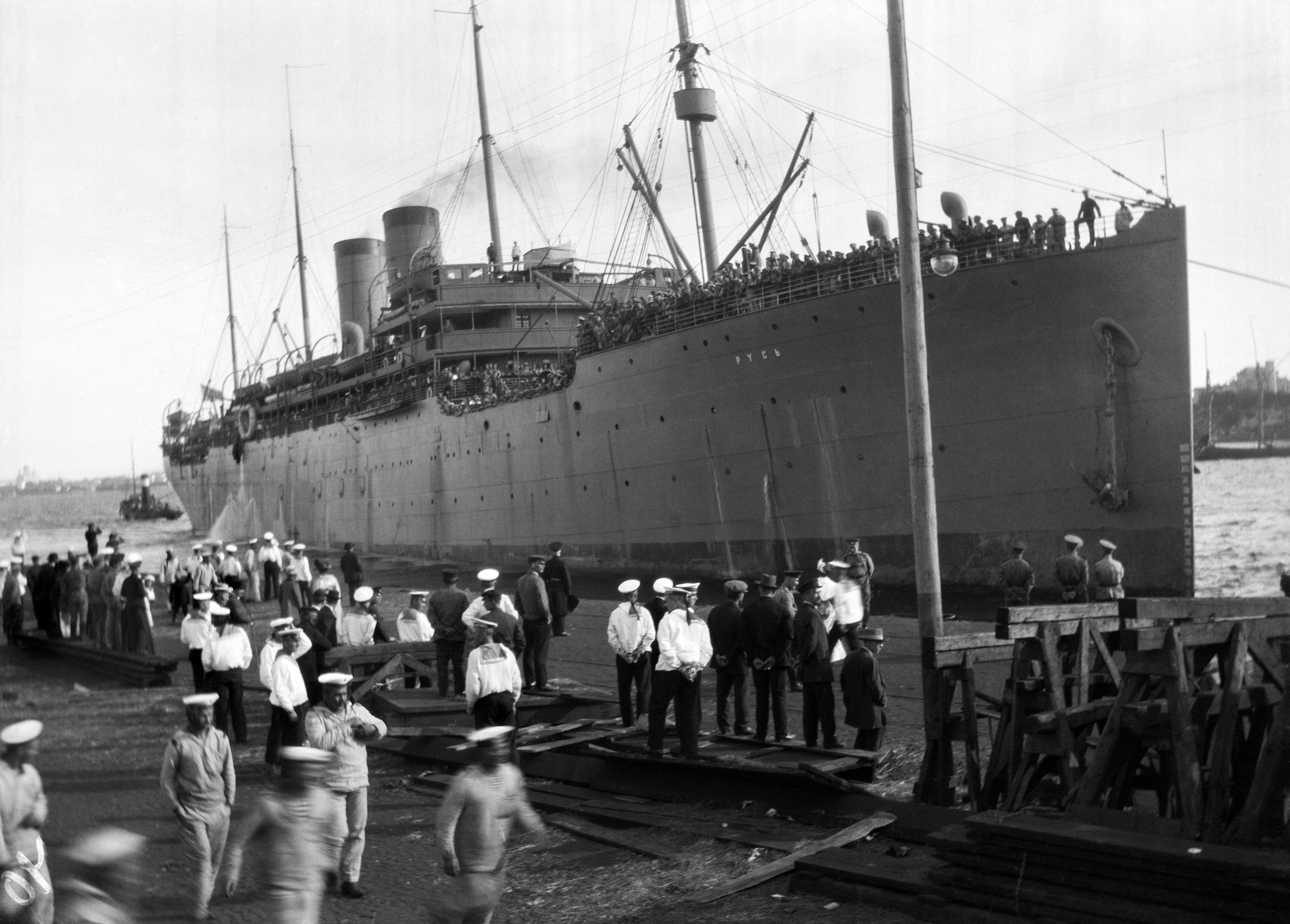
SS Russija docked at Katajanokka, Helsinki between 1914 and 1917

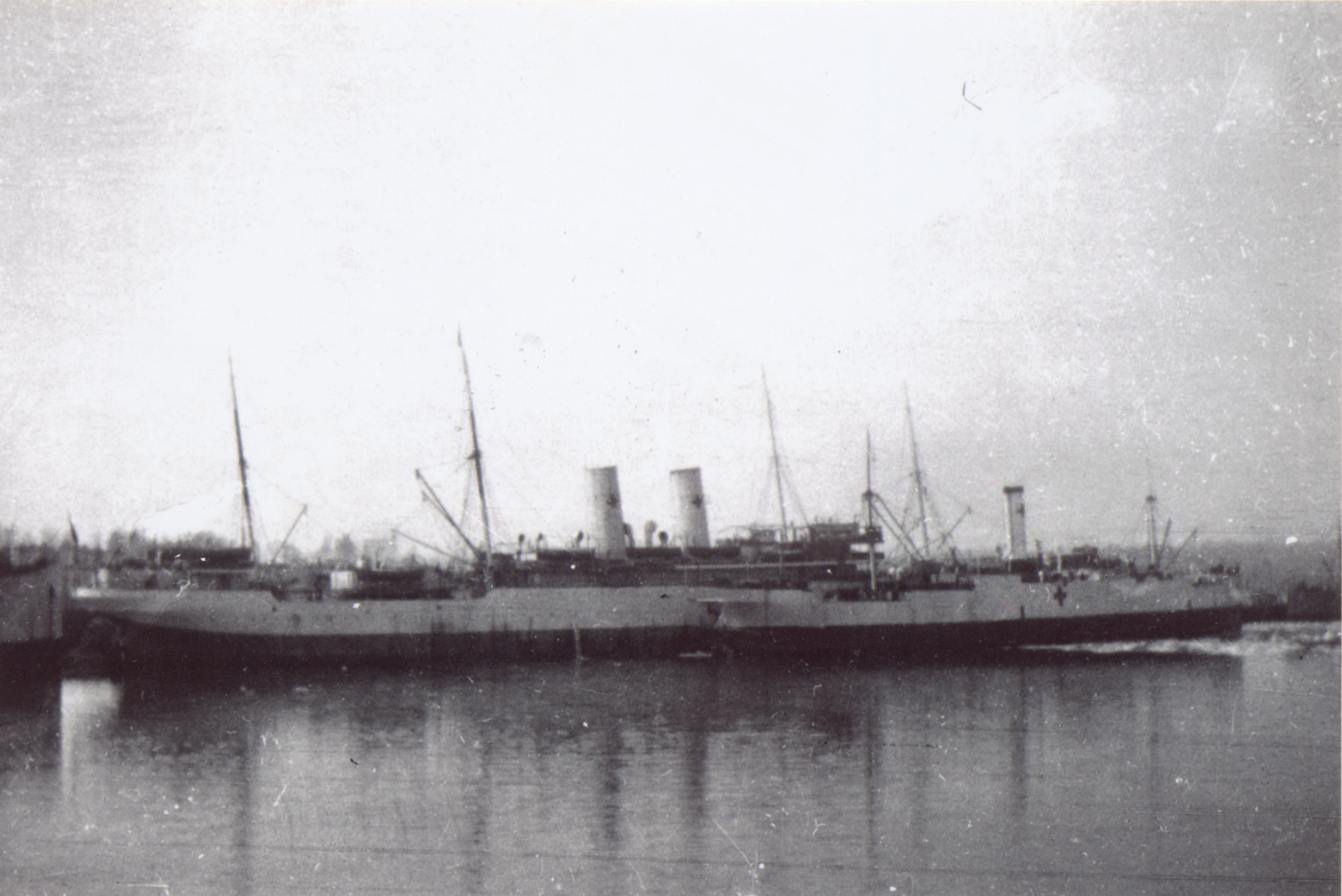
Hospital ships Russ and Joulan around 1918
