= SS Birma =

Transatlantic passenger ship in service 1895–1924

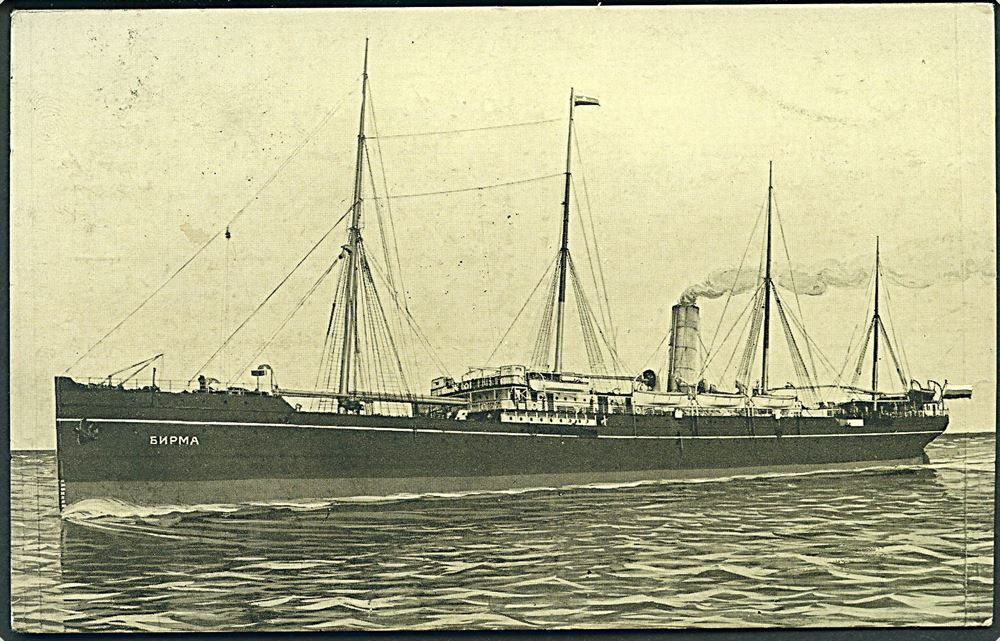
- 1914 postcard

History
- Name: Arundel Castle (1894–1905); Birma (1905–1913, 1918–1921); Mitava (1913–1918); Josef Pilsudski (1921–1923); Franck Hellmers (1923–24); Wilbo (1924)
- Owner: Union-Castle Line; East Asiatic Company; Russian American Line; Polish Navigation Company
- Port of registry: United Kingdom (1894–1905); Denmark (1905–1908); Russia (1908–1914); Russia (1914–1917); (Russia) Russian Republic (1917); Russia (1917–1921); Danzig (1921); Germany (1921–1924)
- Builder: Fairfield Shipbuilding and Engineering Company
- Yard number: 377
- Launched: 2 October 1894
- Completed: 1894
- Maiden voyage: 1895
- In service: 1895–1924
- Out of service: 1924
- Identification: SBA
- Fate: Broken up 1924

General characteristics
- Type: Merchant ship
- Tonnage: 4588 grt; 2879 nrt
- Length: 126.49 m
- Depth: 8.50 m
- Propulsion: Steam

SS Birma was a British-built transatlantic passenger ship. She was built in 1894 by Fairfield Shipbuilding and Engineering Company in Govan, United Kingdom, as Arundel Castle and later went through numerous ownership and name changes, including coming into the hands of the Russian American Line. In 1912, Birma was one of the ships to respond to the sinking of RMS Titanic. She was broken up in 1924 following acquisition by a German line after a liquidation sale.

== Early history ==
Birma was built in Glasgow in 1894, originally as Arundel Castle, for Donald Currie's Castle Mail Packet Company (later renamed the Union-Castle Line). She made her maiden voyage from London to Port Natal in the Colony of Natal in 1895.

In 1905, Arundel Castle was sold to the East Asiatic Company (EAC) in Denmark and renamed Birma. Birma was chartered as a troop transport ship for Russia from 1905 to 1906. In late 1906 and early 1907, she carried the Danish princes Valdemar and George on their tour of the Far East, travelling with EAC founder Hans Niels Andersen. In July and August, the ship served as a royal yacht for King Frederik VIII's visit to Iceland, and near the end of the year, for King Chulalongkorn of Siam during the Mediterranean leg of his visit to Europe.

The ship was transferred in 1908 to EAC's associate company, Russian East Asiatic Steamship Company (Russian American Line). During this time, Birma was mostly used as a ship working on routes between the United States and the Netherlands.

== Titanic ==
In April 1912, Birma was sailing from New York to Rotterdam and was fitted with a De Forest Wireless Telegraphy system. On 14 April, the ship received CQD and SOS distress messages from Titanic. Birma's wireless operator, Joseph Cannon, quickly noted down the location, as given by Titanic, of 41°46'N. 50°14'W. He asked what had happened and Titanic responded that they were sinking after having struck an iceberg. Birma's captain, informed of the situation, relayed a message to the stricken vessel that his ship was 100 nautical miles away and expecting to arrive at the given location at approximately 6:30 am on 15 April. Initially, Birma's crew did not know that the ship in distress was Titanic, as the latter's call sign of "MGY" was so new that it was not in Birma's identification books. They were later informed by the nearby SS Frankfurt that "MGY" was Titanic.

Birma eventually reached the given co-ordinates at 7:30 am, but realised the position given by Titanic must be incorrect because of the large amount of pack ice in the vicinity; they were still 13 nautical miles from where Titanic actually sank. Birma's wireless picked up messages from RMS Carpathia reporting that they had rescued Titanic survivors. Birma later claimed that they offered supplies but was told to "shut up" by Carpathia because they didn't have a Marconi set; such a communication does not appear on Birma's wireless log, however, and Carpathia did later communicate with other non-Marconi ships. As a result, Birma returned to her planned course and on 15 April, passed what her crew believed to be the iceberg that sank Titanic and photographed it. The crew held a memorial service on board and flew the flags of the United States and Russia at half-mast. Though they did not carry a British flag, the passengers made one and it was also flown at half-mast.

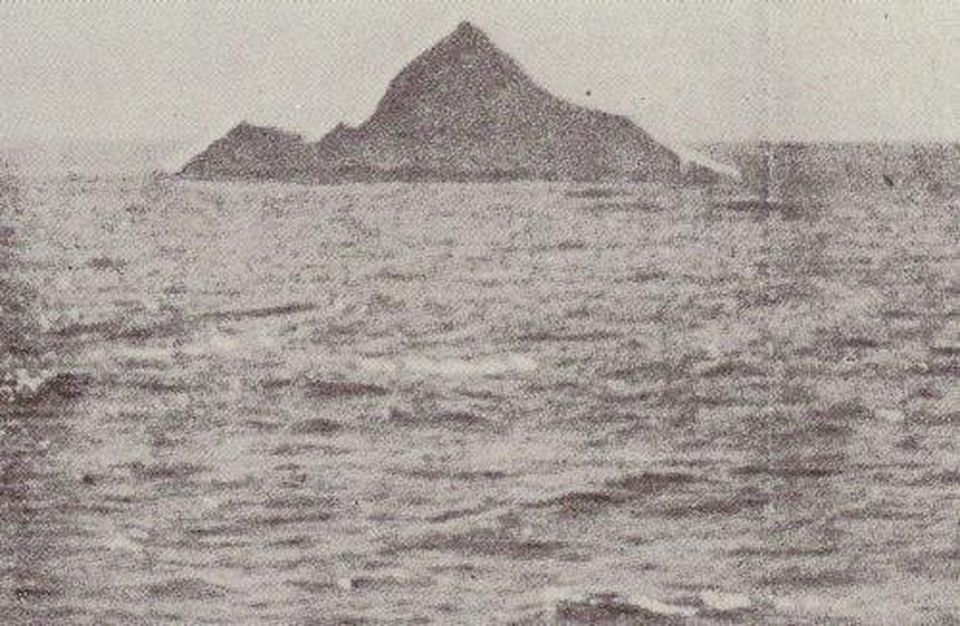
The photo of the iceberg taken on Birma

Ships with Marconi sets started passing messages to each other that Birma had picked up five lifeboats, a claim the ship's crew denied. Birma's crew gave a signed testimony about the disaster to Britain's Daily Telegraph on 25 April. The later British inquiry ignored Birma's testimony, based upon prior testimony from the crew of SS Californian who denied hearing Birma being told to "shut up". The American inquiry only briefly considered the charge, to which the general manager of Marconi in the United States responded that it was never company policy or general orders to ignore requests made by non-Marconi ships during emergencies. Copies of telegrams sent by Titanic that were received by Birma relating to the sinking were later placed in The National Archives in the United Kingdom.

== Later service and fate ==
Birma was renamed Mitava (Russian: Митава, usually romanised as Mitau) in 1913 by the Russian American Line, who used her as an immigrant ship between Libau and New York. In 1914, she was laid up at Kronstadt during the First World War and remained there for the duration (despite being painted as a hospital ship) and returned to East Asiatic Company ownership after the end of the war. In 1921, the Polish Navigation Company bought her and refitted her with a new name of Josef Pilsudski. The maiden voyage under the new name was planned for later in the year but the ship was impounded in Kiel, Germany, for non-payment of $200,000 worth of repair bills. A German company bought the ship and named it Wilbo after the Polish Navigation Company was liquidated. However, in 1924 Wilbo was broken up in Genoa, Italy.

== Gallery ==
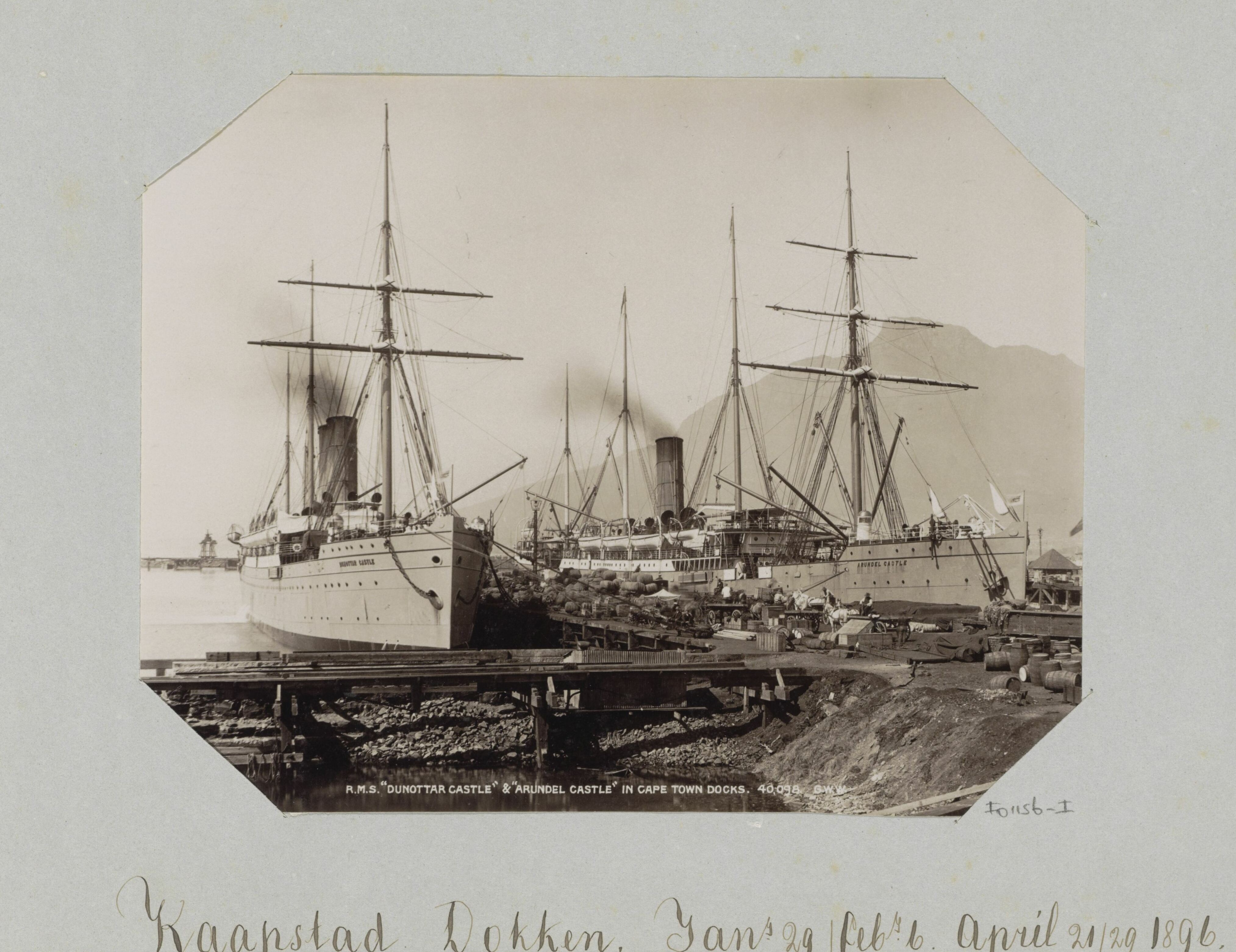
As Arundel Castle (right), in Cape Town, 1896

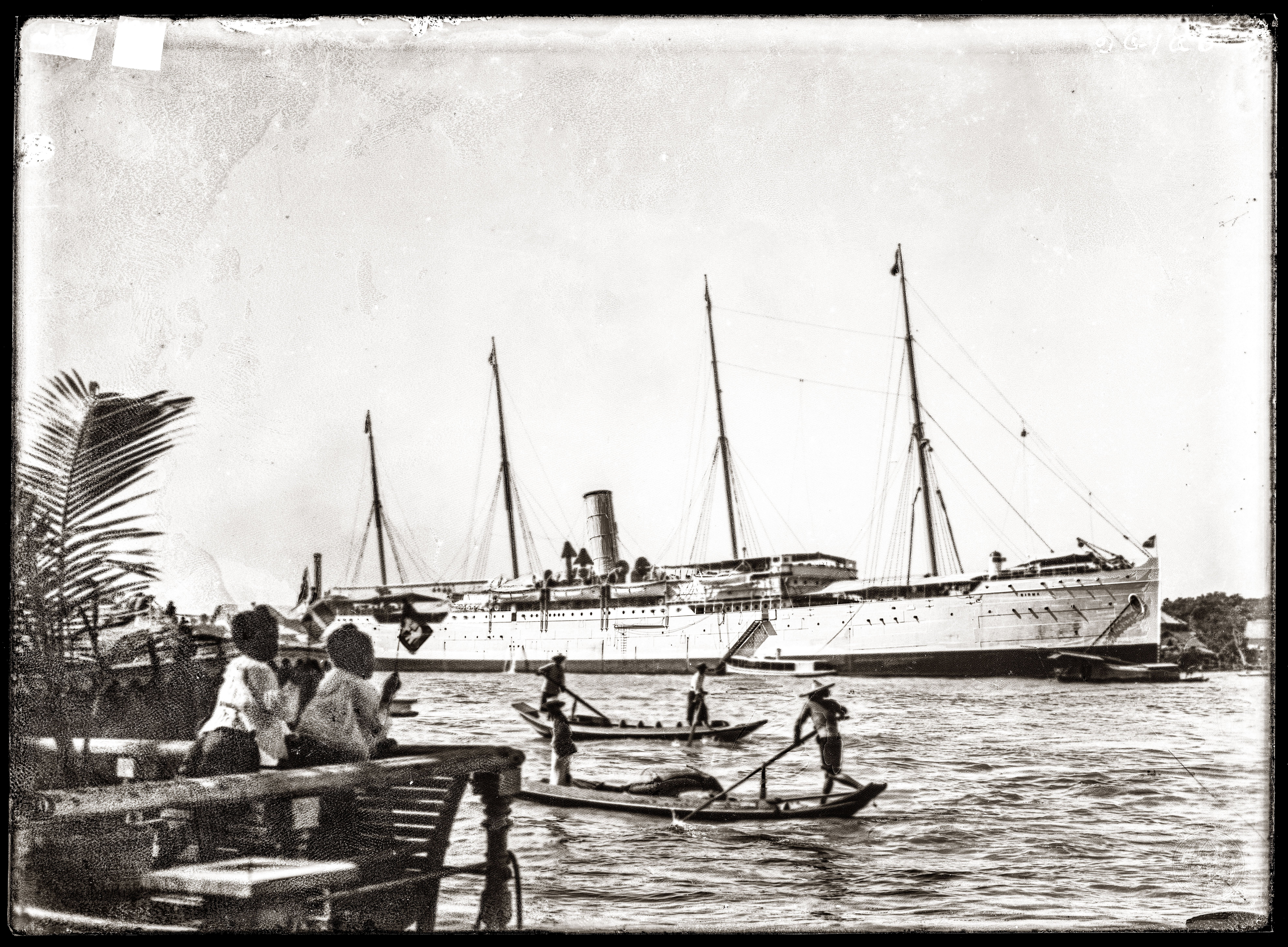
Arriving in Bangkok in 1906

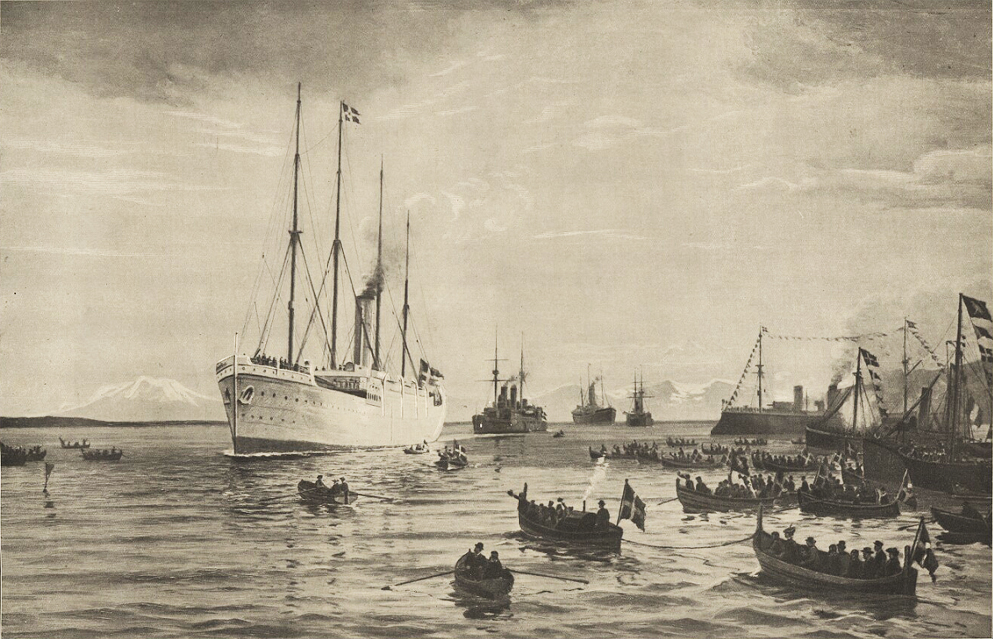
Carrying King Frederik VIII on his visit to Iceland, 1907

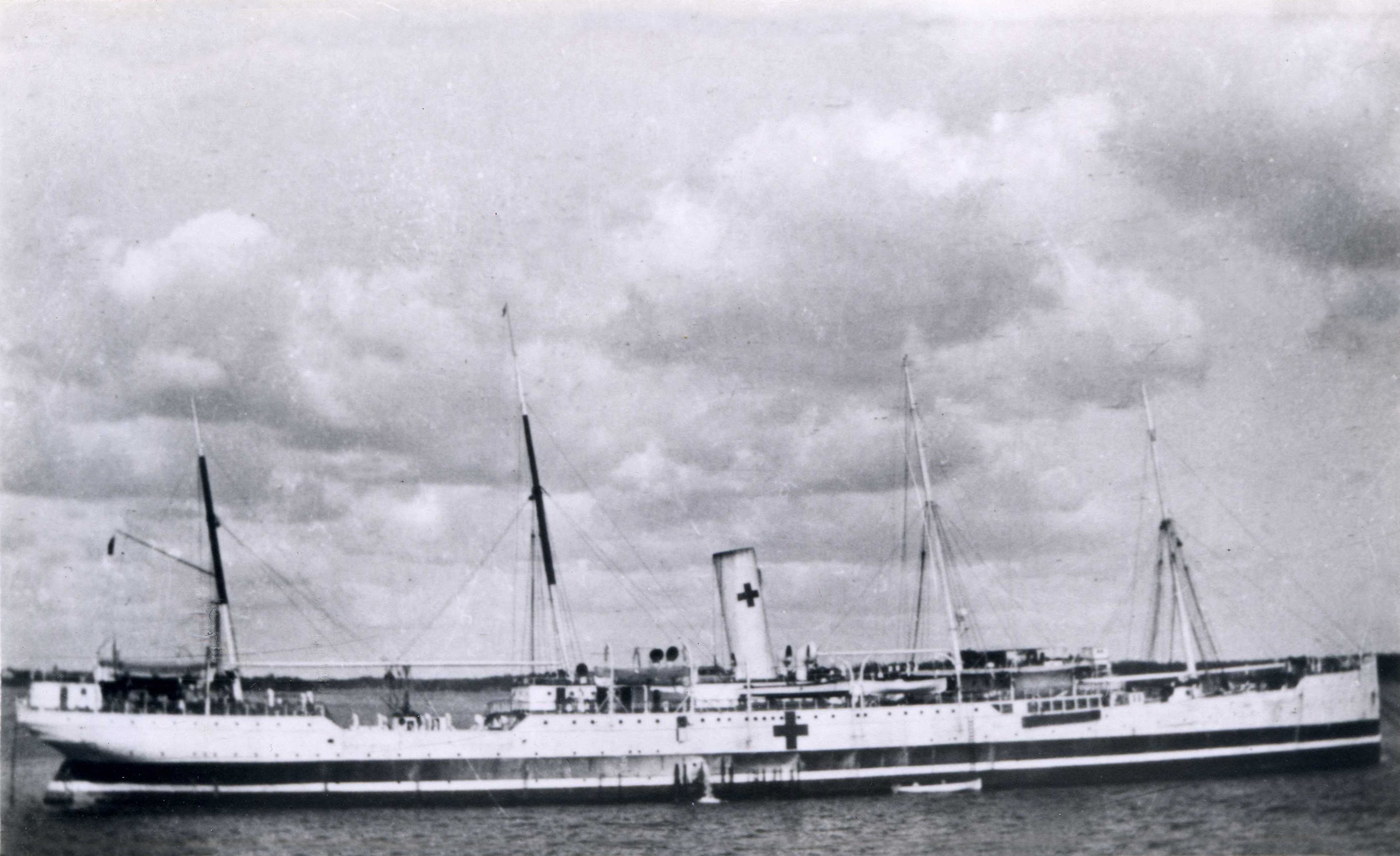
As Hospital Ship Mitava in 1918
