= Port of Gdynia =

Seaport in Poland

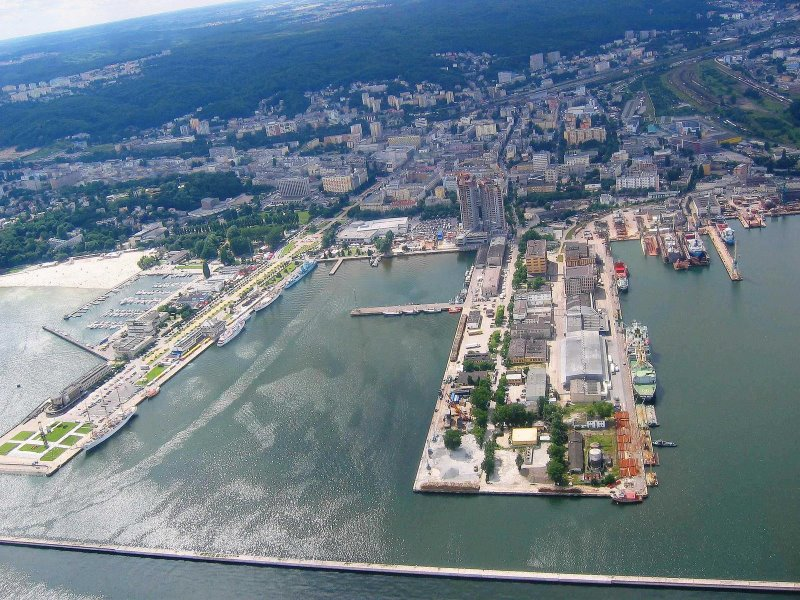
- Dock of the port
- Interactive map of Port of Gdynia

Location
- Country: Poland
- Location: Gdynia
- Coordinates: 54°32′03″N 18°34′23″E
- UN/LOCODE: PLGDY

Details
- Opened: 1926
- Operated by: Port of Gdynia Authority
- Owned by: City of Gdynia
- Type of Harbor: deepwater seaport
- Size: 7,554 km^{2}

Statistics
- Annual container volume: 849,123 (2014)
- Value of cargo: 21,112 (2018)
- Website; Port of Gdynia Authority

Port of Gdynia is a Polish seaport located on the western shore of Gdańsk Bay, Baltic Sea, in Gdynia. Founded in 1926, in 2008 it ranked second in intermodal containers on the Baltic Sea. The port adjoins Gdynia Naval Base, with which it shares waterways, but is administratively a separate entity.

== Trans-shipments ==
- 1924: 10,000 tons
- 1929: 2,923,000 tons
- 1938: 8,700,000 tons
- 1990: 9,987,000 tons
- 1995: 7,739,000 tons
- 2000: 8,397,000 tons
- 2002: 9,349,000 tons
- 2003: 9,797,000 tons
- 2004: 10,711,000 tons
- 2005: 11,038,000 tons
- 2006: 12,218,000 tons
- 2007: 14,849,000 tons
- 2008: 12,860,000 tons
- 2009: 11,361,000 tons
- 2010: 12,346,000 tons
- 2011: 12,992,000 tons
- 2012: 13,187,000 tons
- 2013: 15,051,000 tons
- 2014: 16,961,000 tons
- 2015: 15,521,000 tons
- 2016: 19,536,000 tons
- 2017: 21,225,000 tons
- 2018: 23,500,000 tons
- 2019: 23,960,000 tons
- 2020: 24,662,000 tons
- 2021: 26,692,000 tons
- 2022: 27,932,000 tons
- 2023: 29,399,000 tons
- 2024: 26,895,000 tons
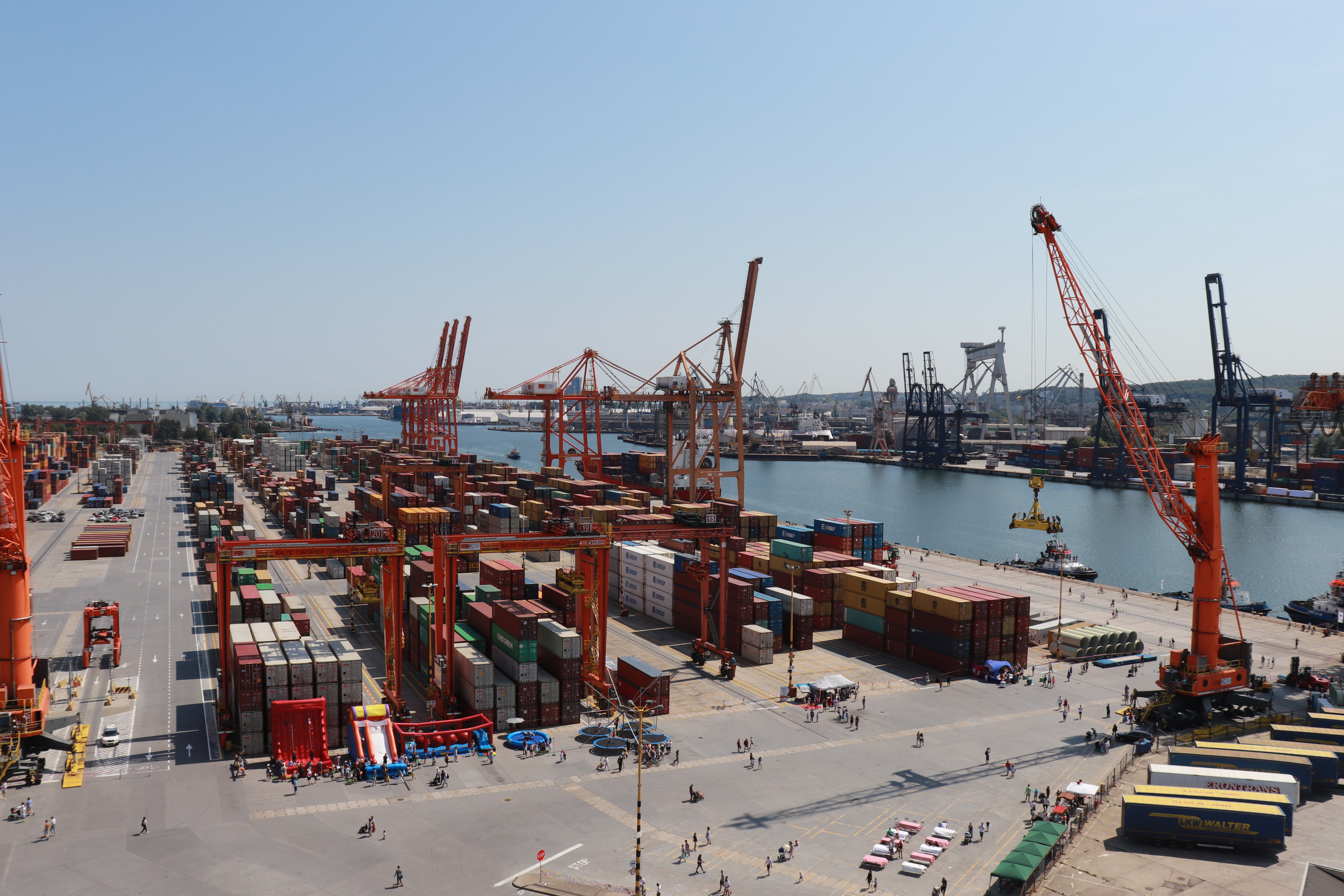
The port's Baltic Container Terminal

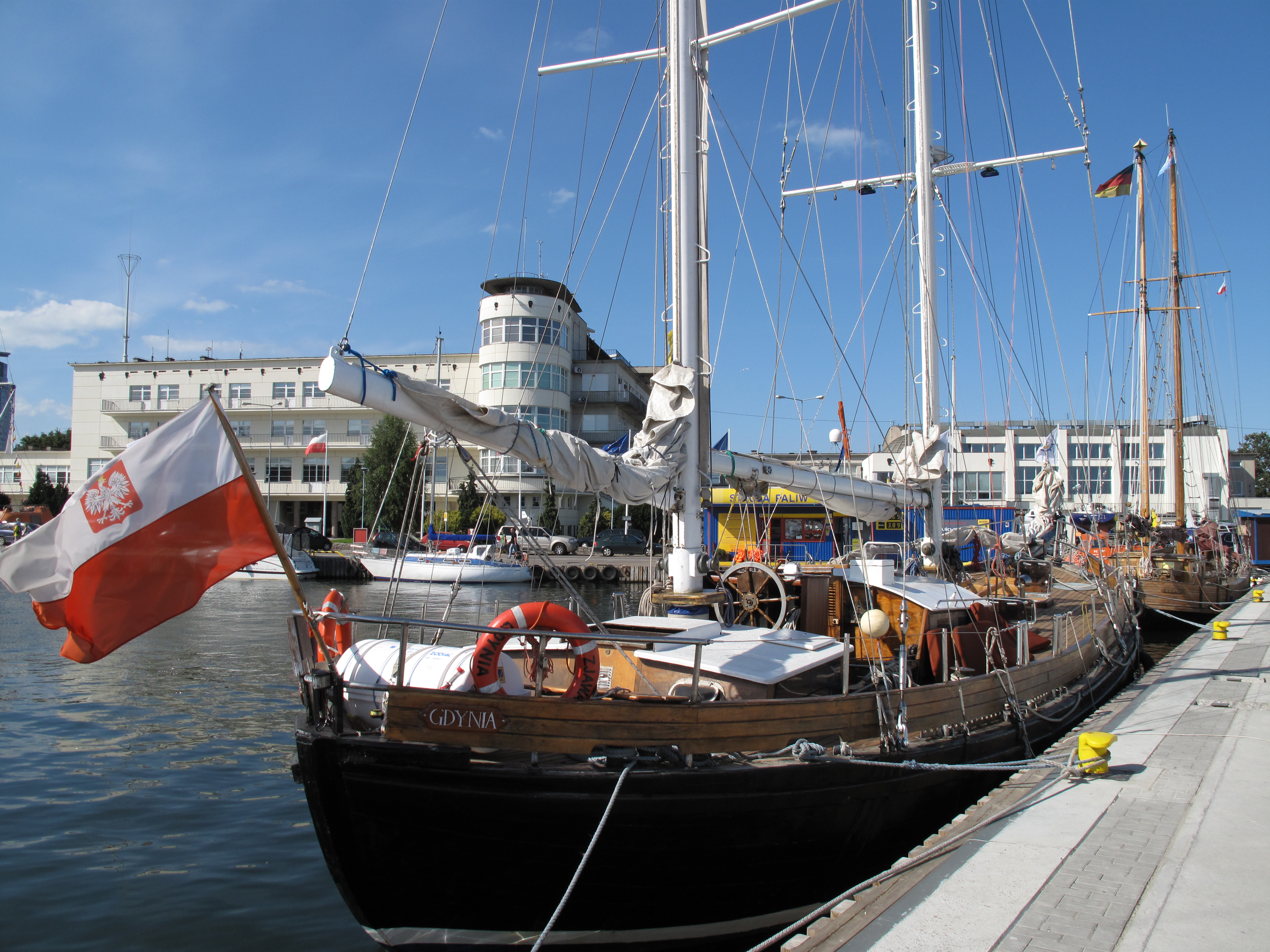
Marina at Port Gdynia

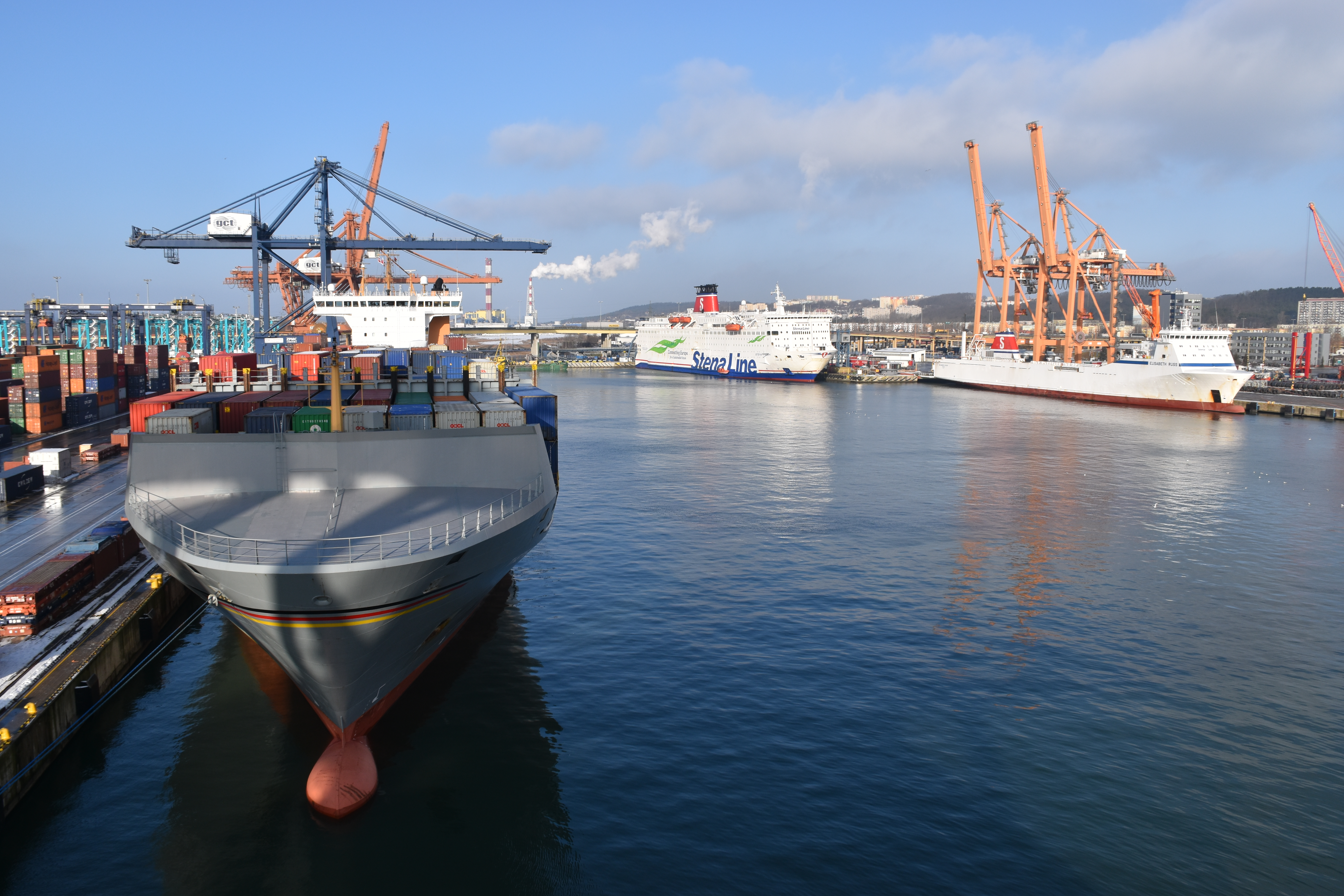
Port Gdynia, February 2018

Schematic chart of the port

== Port Wojenny Gdynia ==
The naval base at Port Wojenny Gdynia is located in the district of Oksywie. The naval base was established in the 1920s alongside the construction of the city's civilian port to secure Poland's strategic access to the Baltic Sea.

It is the mainbase of the 3rd Ship Flotilla of the Polish Navy (Marynarka Wojenna) and serves as a central logistical hub for its warships and submarines. The base is managed by the Military Port Command Gdynia (Komenda Portu Wojennego Gdynia). It is administratively separate from the commercial Port of Gdynia, though they are adjacent to each other and share parts of the main harbor infrastructure.

== See also ==
- Gdynia Shipyard
- Ports of the Baltic Sea
