= SS Dwinsk =

1897 ocean liner sunk by a U-boat in 1918

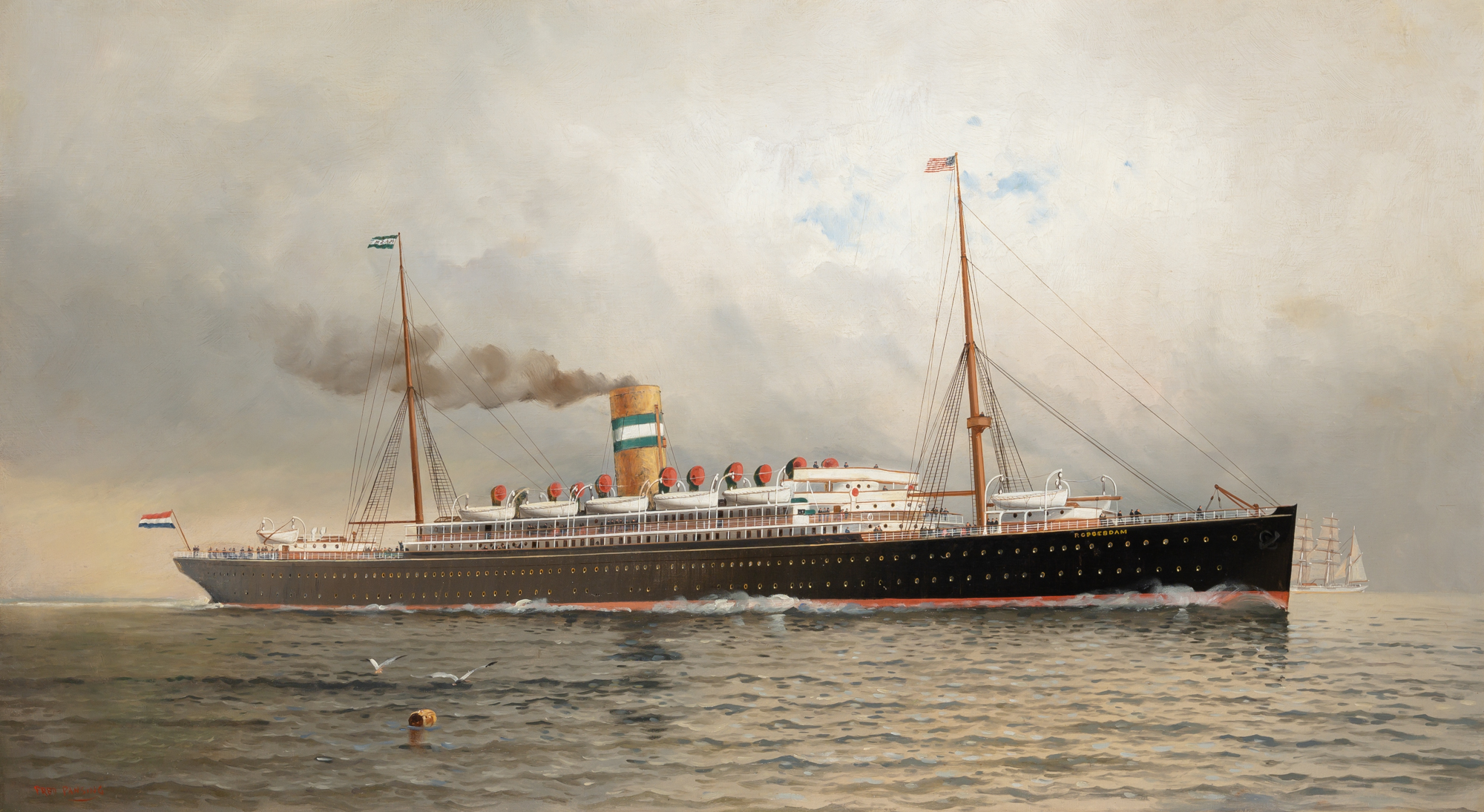
- The ship as Rotterdam, in a painting by Fred Pansing

History
- Name: 1897: Rotterdam; 1906: C. F. Tietgen; 1913: Dwinsk
- Namesake: 1897: Rotterdam; 1906: Carl Frederik Tietgen; 1913: Dwinsk, now Daugavpils
- Owner: 1897: Holland America Line; 1906: Scandinavian America Line; 1913: Russian American Line; 1917: Shipping Controller
- Operator: 1917: Cunard Line
- Port of registry: 1897 (Netherlands) Rotterdam; 1906 (Denmark) Copenhagen; 1913 (Russia) Libau; 1917 (United Kingdom) London
- Route: 1897: Rotterdam – New York; 1906: Copenhagen – New York; 1914: Libau – New York; 1914: Archangel – New York
- Builder: Harland & Wolff, Belfast
- Yard number: 312
- Laid down: 16 May 1896
- Launched: 18 February 1897
- Completed: 29 July 1897
- Maiden voyage: 18 August 1897
- Identification: 1897: code letters WLJR; 1906: code letters NPRK; by 1913: call sign DCF; 1913: code letters IWAR; by 1914: call sign RDK; 1918: UK official number 142312; 1918: code letters JSKH
- Fate: Torpedoed and sunk, 18 June 1918

General characteristics
- Type: 1897: ocean liner; 1918: troop ship
- Tonnage: 8,139 GRT, 5,160 NRT, 9,390 DWT
- Length: 470.3 ft (143.3 m)
- Beam: 53.2 ft (16.2 m)
- Depth: 22.3 ft (6.8 m)
- Decks: 3
- Installed power: 954 NHP, 5,500 ihp (4,100 kW)
- Propulsion: 2 × screws; 2 × triple-expansion engines
- Speed: 15 knots (28 km/h)
- Capacity: passengers, 1897: 212 × 1st class, 112 × 2nd class, 837 × 3rd class; passengers, as refitted: 191 × 1st class, 90 × 2nd class, 610 × 3rd class; cargo: 323,000 cu ft (9,100 m^{3}) bale
- Armament: by 1918: defensively armed

SS Dwinsk was a transatlantic ocean liner that was launched in Ireland in 1897 as Rotterdam, renamed C. F. Tietgen in 1906, and renamed Dwinsk in 1913. A U-boat sank her in 1918, with the loss of 23 lives. The ship was built for Holland America Line (Nederlandsch-Amerikaansche Stoomvaart Maatschappij, or NASM), but was successively owned by Scandinavian America Line and Russian American Line, and after the Russian Revolution she was managed by Cunard Line.

She was the third of several NASM ships to be named after the city of Rotterdam. She was also the first ship that Harland & Wolff built for NASM.

== Building ==
Harland & Wolff built the ship in Belfast as yard number 312 on slipway number 9. Her keel was laid on 16 May 1896, she was launched on 18 February 1897 as Rotterdam, and she was completed on 29 July 1897. Her registered length was 470.3 ft (143.3 m), her beam was 53.2 ft (16.2 m) and her depth was 22.3 ft (6.8 m). Her tonnages were 8,139 GRT, 5,160 NRT and 9,390 DWT.

Rotterdam had berths for 212 passengres in first class, 112 in second class, and 837 in third class. Her holds had capacity for 323,000 cubic feet (9,100 m^{3}) of baled cargo.

The ship had twin screws, each driven by a three-cylinder triple-expansion steam engine. The combined power of her twin engines was rated at 954 NHP or 5,500 ihp, and gave her a speed of 15 knots (28 km/h). She made her sea trials on 29 July 1897.

== Career ==
NASM registered Rotterdam at Rotterdam. Her code letters were WLJR. On 18 August 1897 she left Rotterdam on her maiden voyage, which was to New York via Boulogne. Her final voyage in this route began from Rotterdam on 17 February 1906.

On 5 April 1906 Scandinavian America Line bought Rotterdam and renamed her C. F. Tietgen, after the Danish industrialist Carl Frederik Tietgen. She was registered in Copenhagen, and her code letters were NPRK. On 29 April she began her first voyage from Copenhagen to NewYork via Christiania and Kristiansand.

On 28 June 1906 C. F. Tietgen collided with the 70-foot (21.3 m), 63 GRT US schooner E. C. Hay in the North River off the Desbrosses Street Ferry terminal in New York City. E. C. Hay sank, but all four people aboard her survived.

By 1910 C. F. Tietgen was equipped for wireless telegraphy. On 7 July 1910 she left Copenhagen on a cruise to the North Cape, calling at Bergen and Trondheim. By 1913 her call sign was DCF. On 29 July 1913, Nordisk Film chartered her to appear in the film Atlantis. On 6 November 1913 she began her final voyage from Copenhagen to New York. She completed 110 transatlantic crossings for Scandinavian America Line.

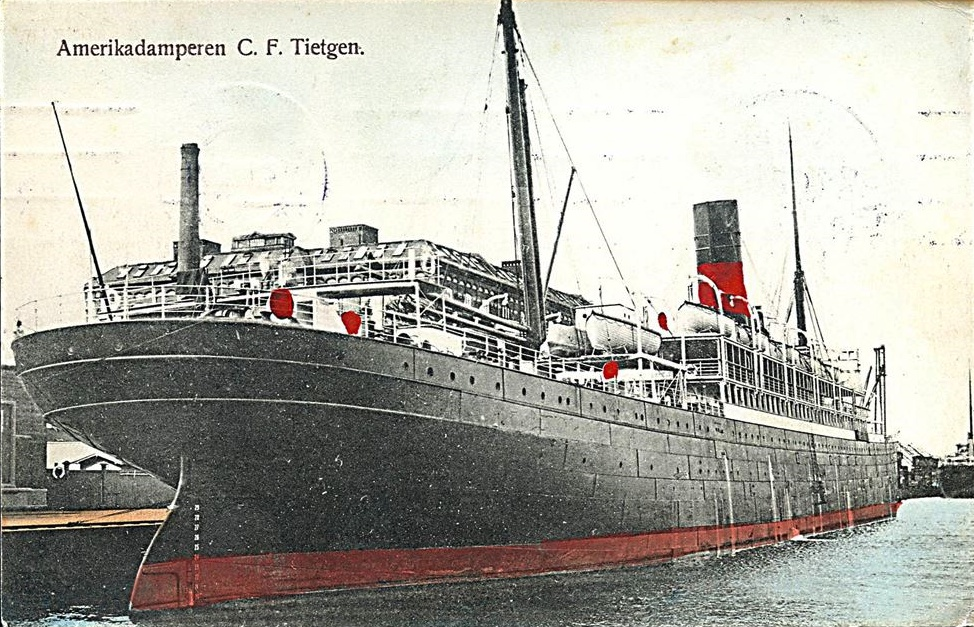
Postcard of C. F. Tietgen, mailed in 1910

On 24 December 1913 Russian American Line bought C. F. Tietgen and renamed her Dwinsk (Двинск), which is a Russian name for the city of Daugavpils in what was then the Vitebsk Governorate of the Russian Empire. She was registered in Libau (now Liepāja in Latvia), her code letters were IWAR, and her wireless telegraph call sign was RDK.

On 10 February 1914, Dwinsk began her first voyage from Libau to New York. Her final voyage on this route began on 28 July 1914, the day the First World War began. On 20 September 1914 she began her first voyage from Archangel to New York via Hammerfest.

After the October Revolution in the Russian Empire, the United Kingdom government seized Dwinsk. The Shipping Controller appointed Cunard Line to manage her. Her UK official number was 142312 and her code letters were JSKH. She was defensively armed with one or more naval guns. On at least one voyage she carried troops from Halifax, Nova Scotia to Great Britain.

== Loss ==
On 18 June 1918 Dwinsk was making 13 knots (24 km/h) en route from Brest, France to the United States. Sources differ as to whether her destination was Newport News or New York. The weather was fine, the sea was smooth, with a slight swell, and visibility was good. At about 09:20 hrs U-151 fired a torpedo at her about 400 nautical miles (740 km) north of Bermuda. Dwinsk's lookouts sighted the torpedo on her port quarter at a range of 200 yards (180 m). Her helm was put hard to port, but the torpedo hit her and exploded in her number 4 hold. U-151 then surfaced and opened fire with her two 88 mm deck guns. One round hit Dwinsk's magazine, which exploded. Her Master gave the order to abandon ship, and her crew launched seven of her lifeboats. Dwinsk sank at about 11:15 hrs at position 39°10′N 63°10′W.

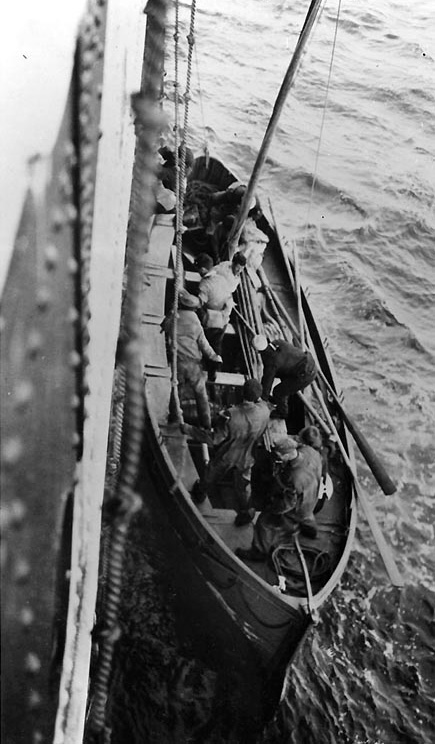
One of Dwinsk's lifeboats alongside USS Siboney on 21 June 1918

U-151 interrogated the occupants of the boat commanded by the second officer, but took no prisoners. The U-boat remained in the area, waiting to attack any ship that came to rescue survivors. Later on 18 June, the troopship USS Von Steuben approached the lifeboats. U-151 fired a torpedo at her, but by changing course Von Steuben avoided being hit, and the troop ship returned fire, firstly with her 5-inch guns, and then with depth charges.

In the ensuing days, the lifeboats became separated. On 21 June the westbound troop ship USS Siboney found two of Dwinsk's boats and rescued their occupants. Four more boats were found and their occupants rescued. One boat, commanded by the boatswain's mate, was found after eight days. The boat commanded by the chief officer lost one occupant to drowning. On 28 June USS Rondo found the boat and rescued its remaining occupants. The boat commanded by the second officer was never found. Including the second officer, it carried 22 people.

In January 1919 Dwinsk's chief officer, Robert Pritchard, and boatswain's mate, Philip Larbalastier, were awarded the Distinguished Service Medal for their "good seamanship, management and fortitude" in command of their respective boats.

== Bibliography ==
- Blazich, Frank R (2016). United States Navy and World War I: 1914–1922 (PDF). Washington, DC: Naval History and Heritage Command.
- Bureau of Navigation (1907). Thirty-Ninth Annual List of Merchant Vessels of the United States for the Year Ending June 30, 1907. Washington, DC: Government Printing Office – via HathiTrust Digital Library.
- Gleaves, Albert (1921). A History of the Transport Service: Adventures and Experiences of United States Transports and Cruisers in the World War. New York: George H. Doran Company. OCLC 976757.
- Lloyd's Register of British and Foreign Shipping. Vol. I.–Steamers. London: Lloyd's Register of Shipping. 1900 – via Internet Archive.
- Lloyd's Register of British and Foreign Shipping. Vol. I.–Steamers. London: Lloyd's Register of Shipping. 1907 – via Internet Archive.
- Lloyd's Register of British and Foreign Shipping. Vol. I.–Steamers. London: Lloyd's Register of Shipping. 1910 – via Internet Archive.
- Lloyd's Register of Shipping. Vol. II.–Steamers. London: Lloyd's Register of Shipping. 1917 – via Internet Archive.
- The Marconi Press Agency Ltd (1913). The Year Book of Wireless Telegraphy and Telephony. London: The St Katherine Press.
- The Marconi Press Agency Ltd (1914). The Year Book of Wireless Telegraphy and Telephony. London: The Marconi Press Agency Ltd.
