= Dobroflot =

Shipping companies of Russia

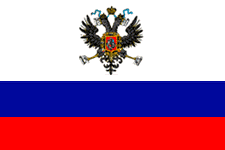
- The first ensign of Dobroflot from 1881 to 1897
- Native name: Добровольный флот
- Industry: Ship transport
- Founded: 1878
- Defunct: 1925
- Fate: Merged with Sovtorgflot

The Russian Volunteer Fleet (Russian: Добровольный флот, romanized: Drobrovolny flot), also simply known as Dobroflot (Russian: Доброфлот, lit. 'Volunteer Fleet') was a state-controlled ship transport association established in the Russian Empire in 1878 funded from voluntary contributions collected by subscription (hence the name).

== History ==
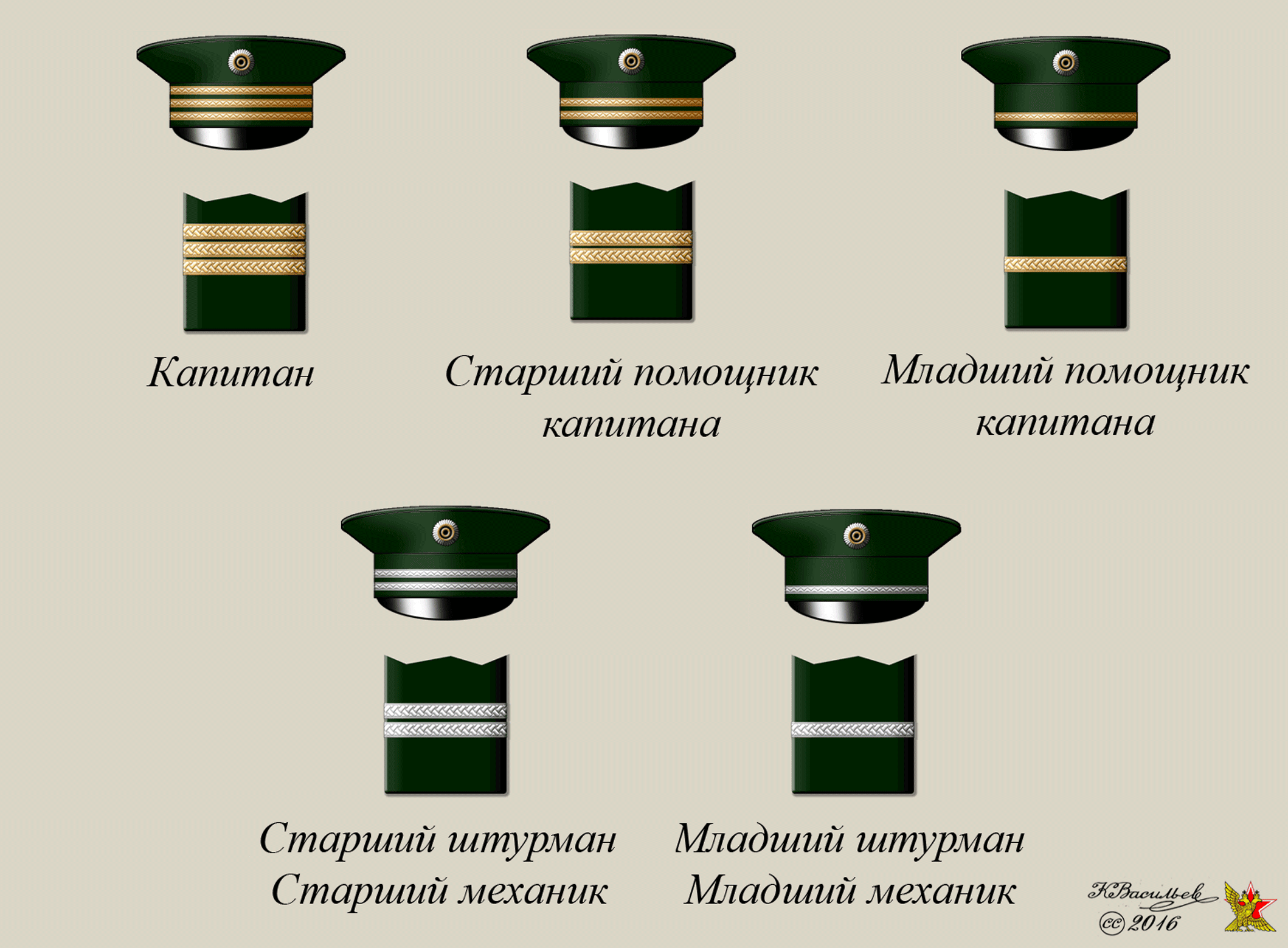
Rank insignia of the Dobroflot 1881: 1. Captain; 2. Senior Chief Mate; 3. Junior Chief Mate; 4. Senior Mate / Senior Engineer; 5. Junior Mate / Junior Engineer

Dobroflot was founded in wake of the Russo-Turkish War (1877–78), with the intent of providing Russia with a fleet of fast armed merchantmen. By the time its first three ships were purchased from Hamburg American Line in June 1878, the war was already over, and the ships were instead used first as troopships to repatriate Russian soldiers from Turkey, then as peacetime merchant ships. The establishment of Dobroflot started an arms race among the world's major maritime powers, in which governments would subsidize the constructions of privately owned merchant ships, on the stipulations that these would be available for conversions to auxiliary cruisers during wartime.

In 1902, an Italian company began negotiating with the committee of the Russian Volunteer Fleet to open a new line between the Black Sea and North America via Italy. The Russian Volunteer Fleet began sailing to New York carrying immigrants in November 1903.

The Hamburg-American Line, in July 1906 intended to start offering a service from Libau in direct competition with the Russian Volunteer Fleet. The announcement was received poorly, as Russia didn't want competition for the Russian Volunteer Fleet.

Throughout its existence Dobroflot provided invaluable services for both the government and the economic development of Russia - particularly the Russian Far East, with Dobroflot established the first regular maritime link between Vladivostok and European Russia. Moreover, Dobroflot ships were requisitioned for naval services during both the Russo-Japanese War and World War I, thereby fulfilling the original raison d'etre of Dobroflot.

After the Russian Revolution and the Russian Civil War the ships of the fleet became dispersed over various countries, and Soviet Russia made efforts via international courts to have them returned. Dobroflot was restored in the Soviet Union in 1922 and included into the Sovtorgflot ("Soviet Commercial Fleet") in 1925.

== See also ==
- Dobrolyot

== Bibliography ==
- Dobroflot at "Departmental Flags of the Russian Empire" page (in Russian)
- People's Voluntary Fleet, В. Дукельский, Московский журнал № 8 — 2006 г. (in Russian)
- Васильев, Кирилл Сергеевич (2016). "Добровольный флот" [Voluntary Fleet]. Петербургский коллекционер [Petersburg collector]. Vol. 4, no. 96. St. Petersburg. pp. 102–105.
