= SS Re d'Italia =

Italian ocean liner (1906–1929)

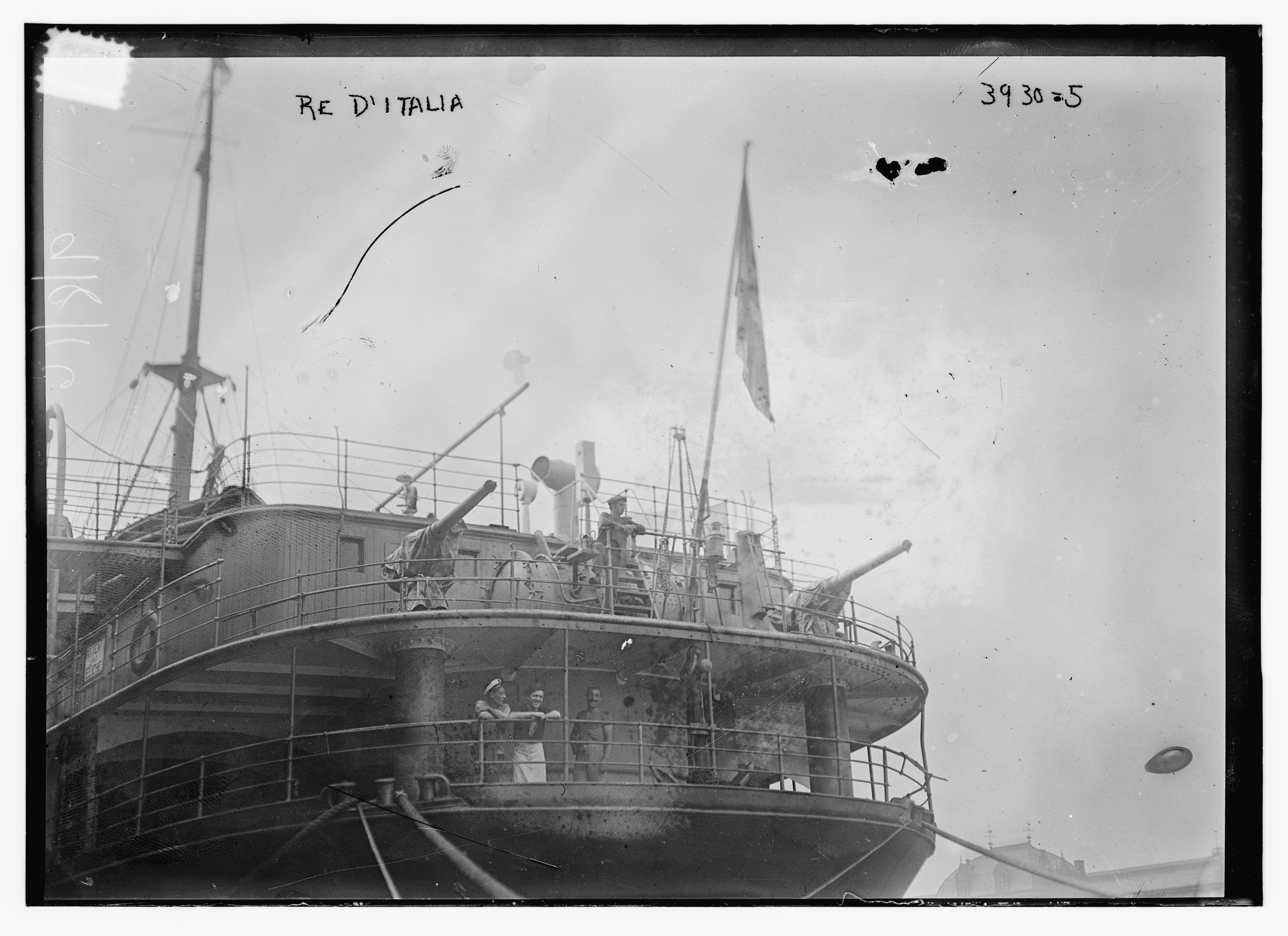
- Re D'Italia in 1916

History

Italy
- Name: SS Re d'Italia
- Namesake: King of Italy (Italian: Re d'Italia)
- Owner: Lloyd Sabaudo
- Port of registry: Genoa
- Builder: Sir J. Laing & Sons Ltd.; Sunderland
- Launched: 22 December 1906
- Maiden voyage: Genoa–Naples–Palermo–New York, 6 April 1907
- Fate: Scrapped, 1929

General characteristics
- Tonnage: 6,560 GRT
- Length: 430 ft (130 m)
- Beam: 52.7 ft (16.1 m)
- Propulsion: two steam engines; twin screw propellers
- Speed: 15 knots (28 km/h)
- Capacity: Passengers (as built): 120 first class; 1,900 third class
- Notes: two funnels, two masts

SS Re d'Italia was an Italian ocean liner for Lloyd Sabaudo named for the King of Italy (Italian: Re d'Italia). Launched in 1906, she sailed between Italy and New York and South America for most of her career. During World War I she was employed as a troopship carrying United States troops to France as part of the United States Navy Cruiser and Transport Force. She was scrapped in 1929.

== Early career ==
Re d'Italia, was built by Sir J. Laing & Sons Ltd. of Sunderland, with steam engines provided by G. Clark Ltd. of Sunderland. Launched on 22 December 1906 for Lloyd Sabaudo, she sailed on her maiden voyage from Genoa to Palermo, Naples, and New York on 6 April 1907. Continuing on Mediterranean–New York service, Re d'Italia sailed opposite of Principe di Piemonte on the route through about 1910, and Regina d'Italia through about 1916. In 1917, Re d'Italia, by this time the only Lloyd Sabaudo ship sailing to the United States, made four roundtrips to New York.

== U.S. troopship duties ==
Beginning in May 1918, Re d'Italia was chartered as a United States troop transport and attached to the United States Navy Cruiser and Transport Force.

Re d'Italia sailed on her first wartime convoy on 18 May from Newport News, Virginia, with U.S. Navy transports Madawaska, Pocahontas, Zeelandia. Rendezvousing with a contingent of transports from New York—Navy transports President Grant, Calamares, Army transport ship El Occidente, Navy stores ship Bridge, and Italian steamer Duca degli Abruzzi—the convoy was escorted by American cruiser Huntington, and destroyers Little and Kimberly. After arriving in France on 30 May, Re d'Italia returned to the United States in mid June.

Re d'Italia's next convoy left Newport News on 23 June and consisted of the Italian steamers Caserta, Duca d'Aosta, the French Patria, and American transports Pocahontas and Susquehanna. Accompanied by Montana, South Dakota, Huntington, Gregory, and Fairfax, the convoy reached France on 5 July. Re d'Italia returned to Virginia on 21 July with Caserta.

Re d'Italia left Newport News with the American transport Tenadores on their next convoy on 31 July, joining up with New York transports Maui, Siboney, Calamares, Henry R. Mallory, and Orizaba. Escorts for the convoy were cruisers Seattle and Charleston, and destroyers Preble, Colhoun,Paul Jones. The convoy arrived in France on 12 August. Re d'Italia arrived back in Virginia on 24 August.

The Italian liner made additional crossings in September and October, returning after the latter on 17 November, six days after the Armistice.

== Later career ==
Re d'Italia's first voyage after the Armistice was from Genoa to Marseille and New York on 27 April 1919. In 1920, she was refitted to carry second- and third-class passengers only. She continued Mediterranean–New York sailings until 1922 when she was transferred to South American service. On 26 October 1923 she made one roundtrip from Genoa to Naples, Palermo, and New York. She was scrapped at Genoa in 1929.
