= SS Duca d'Aosta =

Italian ocean liner

History

Italy
- Name: SS Duca d'Aosta
- Namesake: one of the Dukes of Aosta
- Owner: Navigazione Generale Italiana
- Port of registry: Genoa
- Route: 1909–1912: Genoa–New York; 1912–1914: Italy–South America; 1914–1921: Genoa–New York; 1921–1929: Italy–South America
- Builder: Cantieri Navale Siciliani; Palermo
- Launched: 29 September 1908
- Maiden voyage: Genoa–Naples–New York, 9 November 1909
- Fate: Scrapped, February 1929

General characteristics
- Tonnage: 7,804 GRT
- Length: 475 ft (145 m)
- Beam: 53.3 ft (16.2 m)
- Propulsion: two steam engines; twin screw propellers
- Speed: 16 knots (30 km/h)
- Capacity: Passengers: 80 first class; 16 second class; 1,740 third class
- Notes: two funnels, four masts

SS Duca d'Aosta was an Italian ocean liner for Navigazione Generale Italiana named after one of the Dukes of Aosta. Launched in 1908, she sailed between Italy and New York and South America for most of her career. During World War I she was employed as a troopship carrying United States troops to France as part of the United States Navy Cruiser and Transport Force. She was scrapped in 1929.

== Early career ==
Duca d'Aosta, was built by Cantieri Navale Siciliani of Palermo, with steam engines provided by N. Odero & Co. of Sestri Ponente. Launched on 29 September 1908 for Navigazione Generale Italiana, she sailed on her maiden voyage from Genoa to Naples and New York on 9 November 1909. She continued on this service until 20 November 1912, when she was switched to an Italy–South American route. On 7 July 1914, Duca d'Aosta resumed Genoa–New York service.

== U.S. troopship duties ==
In May 1918, Duca d'Aosta was chartered as a United States troop transport and attached to the United States Navy Cruiser and Transport Force, and sailed on a total of five roundtrips before the Armistice.

Sailing in her first troopship convoy at 18:30 on 10 May, Duca d'Aosta departed from Newport News, Virginia, with U.S. Navy transports Lenape, Pastores, Wilhelmina, Princess Matoika, Antigone, and Susquehanna, and the British steamer Kursk. The group rendezvoused with a similar group that left New York the same day, consisting of President Lincoln, Covington, Rijndam, British troopship Dwinsk, and Italian steamers Caserta and Dante Alighieri. American cruiser Frederick served as escort for the assembled ships, which were the 35th U.S. convoy of the war. On 20 May, the convoy sighted and fired on a "submarine" that turned out to be a bucket; the next day escort Frederick left the convoy after being relieved by nine destroyers. Three days later the convoy sighted land at 06:30 and anchored at Brest that afternoon. Duca d'Aosta safely arrived back in the U.S. on 5 June. Fate, however, was not as kind to former convoy mates President Lincoln and Dwinsk. On their return journeys they were sunk by German submarines U-90 and U-151, respectively.

Duca d'Aosta 's next convoy left Newport News on 23 June and consisted of the Italian steamers Caserta, Re d'Italia, the French Patria, and American transports Pocahontas and Susquehanna. Accompanied by Montana, South Dakota, Huntington, Gregory, and Fairfax, the convoy reached France on 5 July. Duca d'Aosta returned to Virginia on 19 July with Pocahontas.

Duca d'Aosta sailed again for France on 26 July with Pocahontas, Susquehanna, and Caserta from Newport News, and met up with U.S. Navy transports Finland, Kroonland and the Italian Taormina that had sailed at the same time from New York. Cruisers Pueblo and Huntington, and destroyers Rathburne and Colhoun ushered the transports to France, where they arrived on 7 August. Duca d'Aosta arrived back in the United States on 18 August.

The Italian liner began her next crossing on 30 August when she sailed from Newport News with USS America and Caserta to join the New York contingent of Kroonland Susquehanna, Harrisburg and Plattsburg. Duca d'Aosta 's convoy was escorted by Frederick and Colhoun.

Duca d'Aosta embarked from Genoa, Italy on March 29, 1919, carrying troops from the 332nd Infantry. She arrived in New York, New York on April 14, 1919.

Beginning what would be her last wartime troop transport crossing, Duca d'Aosta sailed with Navy transports Martha Washington and Aeolus from Newport News on 21 October. Pocahontas and Brazilian steamer Sobral, sailing from New York, and U.S. Navy escorts New Hampshire, Charleston, South Dakota, Talbot, and Radford filled out the convoy, which arrived on 4 November. Duca d'Aosta returned to the U.S. on 17 November, six days after the Armistice.

== Later career ==
After her release from the U.S. charter, Duca d'Aosta once again resumed sailing the Genoa–New York service in 1918, which she continued through June 1921. Returned to South American routes at that time, she continued in that service through February 1929 at which time she was scrapped.
