= USS Martha Washington =

1907 ocean liner and US Army transport ship

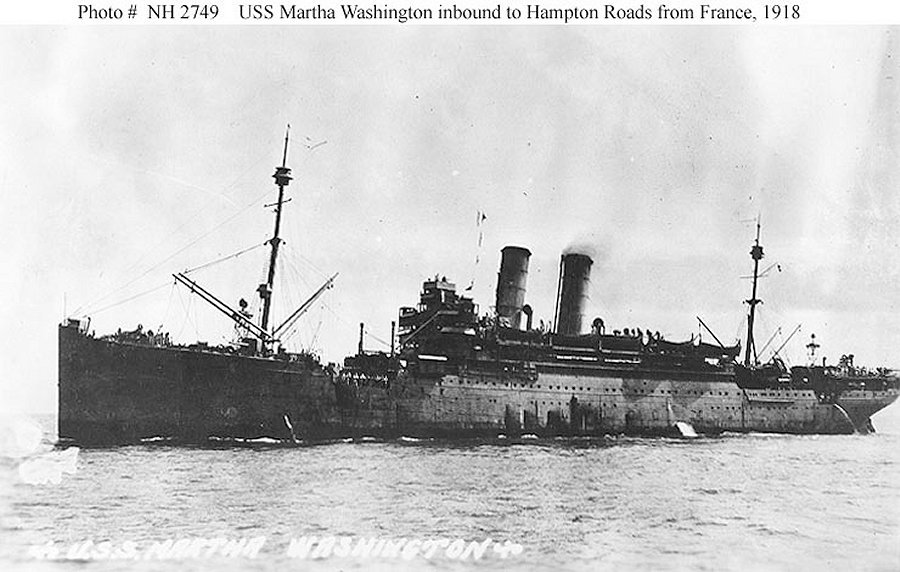
- USS Martha Washington inbound to Hampton Roads, Virginia, from Brest, France, 1918.

History

Austria-Hungary
- Name: SS Martha Washington
- Namesake: Martha Washington
- Owner: Austro-American Line
- Port of registry: Trieste, Austria-Hungary
- Route: Trieste–New York
- Builder: Russell & Co.; Port Glasgow, Scotland
- Yard number: 589
- Launched: 7 December 1907
- Commissioned: 17 April 1908
- Fate: Interned in the United States, 1914

United States
- Name: USAT Martha Washington
- Acquired: 6 April 1917
- Fate: transferred to the U.S. Navy, November 1917

United States
- Name: USS Martha Washington (ID-3019)
- Acquired: November 1917
- Commissioned: 2 January 1918
- Decommissioned: 18 November 1919
- Stricken: 18 November 1919
- Fate: Transferred to the War Department for use by the U.S. Army

United States
- Name: USAT Martha Washington
- Acquired: after 18 November 1919
- Fate: Sold to Cosulich Line, 1922

Italy
- Name: Tel Aviv
- Owner: 1922–1932: Cosulich Line; 1932–1934: Italia Flotte Riunite
- Port of registry: Trieste, Italy
- Renamed: 1932: Tel Aviv
- Fate: Scrapped, 1934

General characteristics
- Tonnage: 8,312 GRT
- Displacement: 12,700 tons
- Length: 460 ft (140.2 m)
- Beam: 56 ft (17.1 m)
- Draft: 24 ft 6 in (7.5 m)
- Propulsion: steam engine powered by screw propeller made by Rankin & Blackmore
- Speed: 17.2 knots (31.9 km/h)
- Troops: 3,380
- Complement: 949
- Armament: 4 × 5-inch (130 mm) guns; 2 × 1-pounder guns

USS Martha Washington (ID‑3019) was a transport for the United States Navy during World War I named for Martha Washington, the first First Lady of the United States. She was originally ocean liner Martha Washington for the Austro-American Line before the war. Before and after her Navy service she was the United States Army transport USAT Martha Washington. The liner was sold to the Italian Cosulich Line in 1922. In 1932, when Cosulich was absorbed into Italia Flotte Riunite (English: United Fleets Italy), the ship was renamed Tel Aviv. She was scrapped in 1934.

== Early career ==
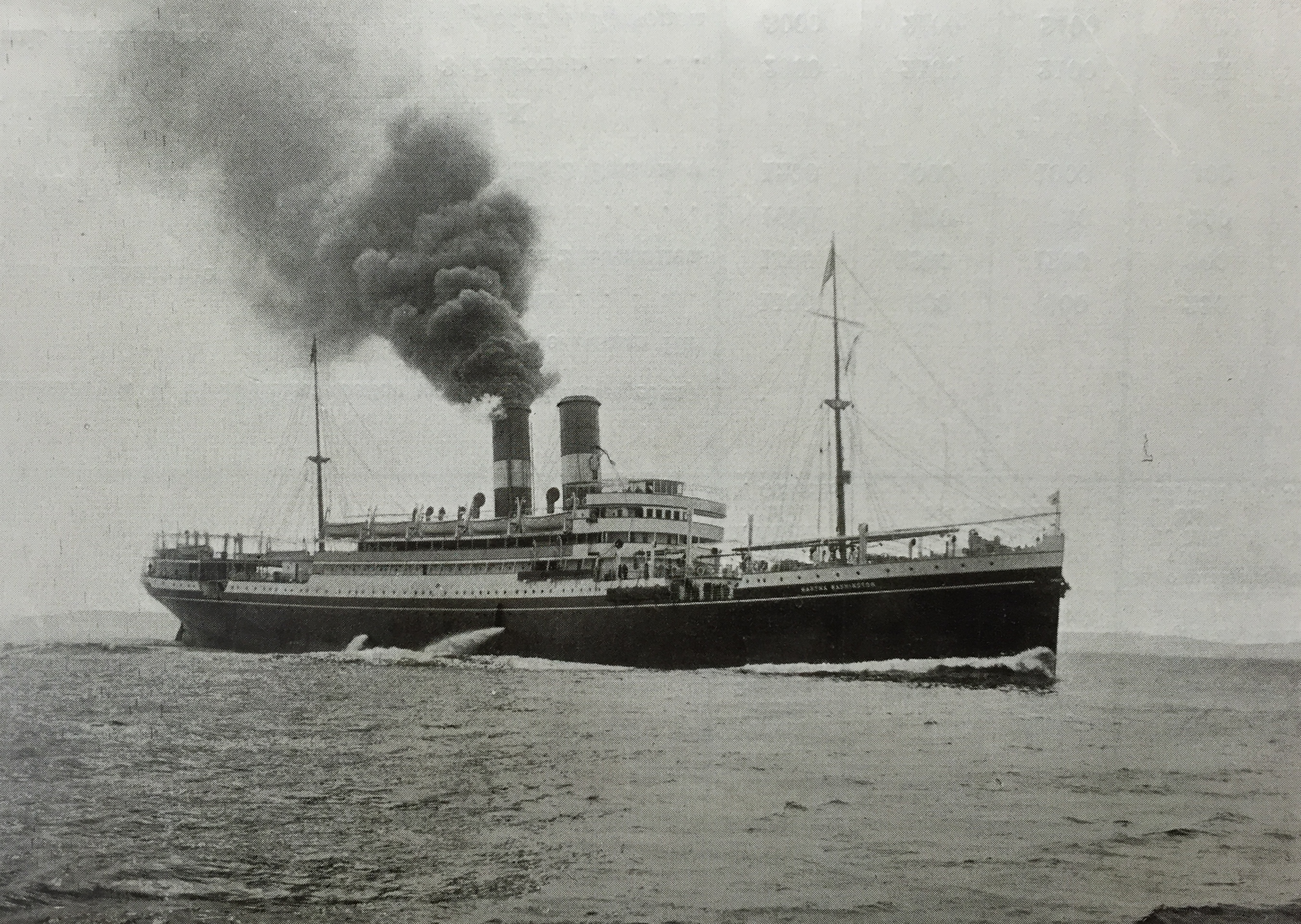
Martha Washington in 1913

Martha Washington was launched on 7 December 1907 by Russell & Co. of Port Glasgow, Scotland for the Austro-American Line (formal name: Unione Austriaca di Navigazione). The liner sailed between Trieste and New York City.

On the evening of 20 November 1911, while steaming in the Ionian Sea from Patras and headed for New York, Martha Washington came under fire from an Italian battleship for a period of ten minutes, with shells falling within one ship length (about 500 ft or 150 m) of the liner. According to the captain of the liner, the Italians, fighting against Turkey in the Italo-Turkish War, mistook Martha Washington for a Turkish ship. The ship was allowed to pass unharmed after the crew used a signal lamp to communicate her identity to the Italians.

At the outbreak of World War I, Martha Washington was interned at Hoboken, New Jersey, in 1914.

== World War I ==
After the United States entered the war, Martha Washington was taken over by the U.S. Army Quartermaster Department on 6 April 1917. The former liner was acquired by the Navy in November 1917. She was commissioned on 2 January 1918.

=== Transporting troops to France ===
Two months of round‑the‑clock effort restored the ship to seaworthiness and modified her as a troop transport. Martha Washington sailed on eight wartime voyages carrying troops to France, embarking a total of 24,005 passengers. Sailing as a part of the Cruiser and Transport Force, Martha Washington sailed from New York on 10 February on her first of voyage carrying troops to France with Navy transports Antigone, President Lincoln, and Von Steuben, and Army transport Finland, under escort of the cruiser Pueblo. Martha Washington arrived back at New York on 14 March. Leaving New York again on 23 March, she convoyed with El Occidente, Powhatan, Finland, and cruiser Pueblo, arriving in France on 4 April. Martha Washington and Powhatan returned to the U.S. on 22 April.

Martha Washington next departed Newport News on 30 April 1918 with Powhatan. Rendezvousing with the two transports was a convoy sailing from New York consisting of Kroonland, Matsonia, Manchuria, and Finland (now a Navy transport). South Dakota provided the convoy with protection until its arrival in France on 12 May. Martha Washington returned to Virginia on 1 June. Departing Newport News on 10 June, Martha Washington sailed with Aeolus, Powhatan, Matsonia, and British troopship Czaritza. Meeting up with Manchuria which sailed from New York, the convoy—escorted by cruisers Seattle and Frederick, and destroyer Stevens—reached France on 18 June. Martha Washington returned to the U.S. on 30 June.

Departing Newport News once again for France on 10 July, Martha Washington, accompanied by Aeolus, Powhatan, and Matsonia, joined with the New York contingent—Navy transports Sierra and Manchuria, and steamers Narragansett, Lutetia, and Toloa—and arrived in France on 21 July. Cruiser Seattle and destroyers Stringham, Fairfax, Mayrant, and Paul Jones served as escorts on the eastbound crossing. Aeolus and Matsonia joined Martha Washington in arriving in Virginia on 5 August.

With Manchuria, Henderson, Aeolus, Koningen der Nederlanden, and steamer Patria, Martha Washington sailed from Newport News for France on 14 August. Louisville and Matsonia, sailing from New York, joined the convoy, which was escorted by cruisers Rochester, Seattle, and Frederick. Records of this convoy are sketchy, but Henderson and Matsonia are known to have arrived in France on 25 August, and the other ships probably arrived around that same time. Upon Martha Washington 's return to the U.S. she shifted to New York.

After embarking 3,029 troops, Martha Washington departed again on 15 September sailing with Henderson, Pocahontas, Calamares, Finland, Powhatan, and steamer Ulua. Martha Washington 's New York group met up with a Virginia group of Navy transports Aeolus and Koningen der Nederlanden, and steamers Patria and Kursk. Escorts—consisting of battleship New Hampshire, cruisers St. Louis and Pueblo, and destroyers Stribling, Hopkins, and Stringham—helped to ensure the safe arrival of all ships in France on 28 September. Finland and Pocahontas accompanied Martha Washington on her return journey and arrived at New York on 12 October.

Beginning what would be her final wartime crossing, Martha Washington sailed with Aeolus and Italian steamer Duca d'Aosta on 21 October from Newport News. Navy transport Pocahontas and Brazilian steamer Sobral, sailing from New York, and escorts New Hampshire, Charleston, South Dakota, Talbot, and Radford filled out the convoy, which arrived on 4 November. Returning to the U.S. five days after the Armistice, Martha Washington made eight additional voyages—from 26 November 1918 to 11 November 1919—returning 19,687 troops and passengers from foreign ports. During her seventh voyage she also disembarked 945 interned German aliens at Rotterdam in the Netherlands.

On her final voyage she arrived at Brest on 14 August and received new orders to transport an American relief mission to Turkey and Russia. Under the leadership of Major General James Harbord, U.S. Army, the mission spent the first two weeks in September at Constantinople and after arriving at Batum, Russia, on 18 September, spent the following three weeks there. In this period of civil turmoil, Martha Washington brought 324 Armenian and Polish refugees to Constantinople. Sailing for the United States on 15 October, she called at Malta, Marseille, and Brest before arriving at New York on the first anniversary of the Armistice signing. She was decommissioned on 18 November 1919 and was turned over to the War Department.

== Later career ==
In November 1922, Martha Washington was sold to the Cosulich Line. Around the time that line was absorbed into the state-owned Italia Flotte Riunite in 1932, Martha Washington was renamed Tel Aviv. The liner was scrapped in 1934.
