= Cruiser and Transport Force =

The Cruiser and Transport Service was a unit of the United States Navy's Atlantic Fleet during World War I that was responsible for transporting American men and materiel to France.

== Composition ==
On 1 July 1918, the Cruiser and Transport Force was composed of the following ships:

=== Cruiser Force ===
Rear Admiral Albert Gleaves Commander

==== Squadron One ====
Cruiser Force, Squadron One, was under the command of Rear Admiral Albert Gleaves

Division One

- Seattle, flagship
- North Carolina
- Montana
- Huntington

Division Two

- South Dakota
- Pueblo
- Frederick
- San Diego

Division Three

- Columbia
- Minneapolis
- DeKalb
- Von Steuben

Special Duty

- Niagara
- Dubuque

==== Squadron Two ====
Cruiser Force, Squadron Two, was under the command of Rear Admiral Marbury Johnston

Division Four

Cruiser Force, Squadron Two, Division Four, was commanded by Rear Admiral Hilary P. Jones

- Sialia, flagship
- Charleston
- St. Louis
- Rochester
- Olympia

Division Five

- Isis, flagship
- Denver
- Galveston
- Cleveland
- Des Moines

Division Six

- Albany
- New Orleans
- Tacoma
- Chattanooga

==== French Navy warships ====
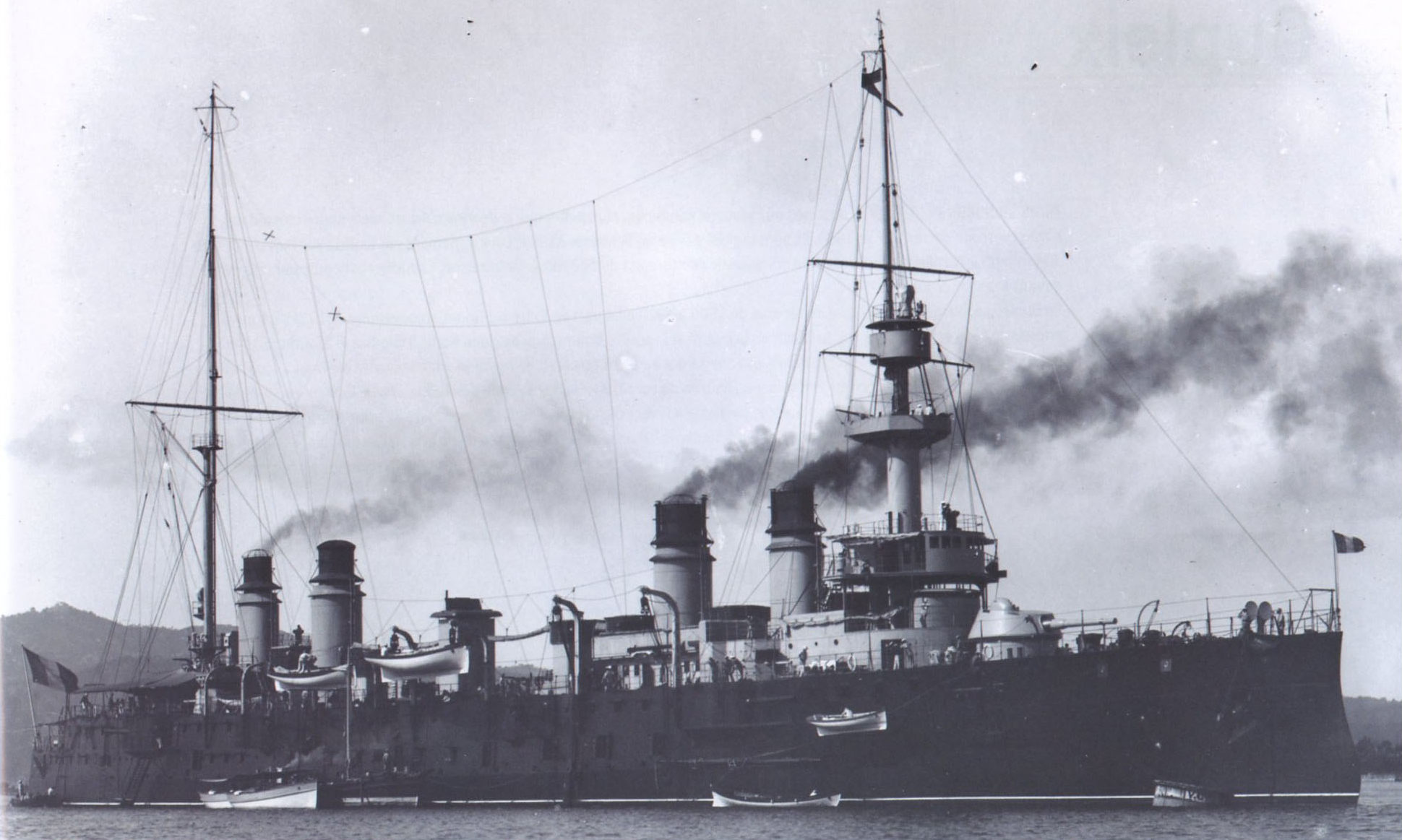
The Dupetit-Thouars

French cruisers of the Naval Division of the Atlantic operating with Cruiser Force under the command of French Rear Admiral Marie Gaston Grout

- Gloire, flagship
- Marseillaise
- Du Petit-Thouars (sunk by SM U-62, 7 August 1918)

=== Transport Force ===
==== New York Division ====
Transport Force, New York Division, was under the command of Rear Admiral Albert Gleaves

- Agamemnon
- America
- Calamares
- Finland
- George Washington
- Great Northern
- Hancock
- Harrisburg
- Henderson
- Kroonland
- Lenape
- Leviathan
- Louisville
- Henry R. Mallory
- Manchuria
- Matsonia
- Maui
- Mongolia
- Mount Vernon
- Northern Pacific
- Orizaba
- Plattsburg
- President Grant
- Princess Matoika
- Rijndam
- Siboney
- Sierra
- Saint Paul
- Wilhelmina

==== Newport News Division ====
Transport Force, Newport News Division, was under the command of Rear Admiral Hilary P. Jones

- Aeolus
- Antigone
- Huron
- Madawaska
- Martha Washington
- Mercury
- Pastores
- Pocahontas
- Powhatan
- Susquehanna
- Tenadores
- Zeelandia

==== Foreign vessels ====
Foreign vessels operating with the Transport Force Newport News Division

- SS America (Italian)
- SS Caserta (Italian)
- HMT Czar (British)
- HMT Czaritza (British)
- SS Dante Alighieri (Italian)
- SS Duca degli Abruzzi (Italian)
- SS Duca d'Aosta (Italian)
- SS France (French)
- HMT Kursk (British)
- SS Lutetia (French)
- SS Patria (French)
- SS Re d'Italia (Italian)
- SS Sobral (Brazilian)
