= SS Caserta =

History

Italy
- Name: 1904: SS Maritzburg; 1905: SS Mendoza; 1914: SS Caserta; 1923: SS Venezuela
- Namesake: 1904: Maritzburg; 1905: Mendoza Province, Argentina; 1914: Caserta, Campania; 1923: Venezuela
- Owner: 1904: Bucknall Line; 1905: Lloyd Italiano; 1918: Navigazione Generale Italiana; 1923: La Veloce; 1924: Navigazione Generale Italiana
- Port of registry: 1905: Genoa
- Builder: Sir W. G. Armstrong, Whitworth and Company; Newcastle upon Tyne, England
- Yard number: 739
- Launched: 16 August 1904
- Fate: Scrapped, March 1928

General characteristics
- Tonnage: 6,847 GRT
- Length: 420 ft (130 m)
- Beam: 51 ft (16 m)
- Propulsion: two triple-expansion steam engines; twin screw propellers
- Speed: 14 knots (26 km/h)
- Notes: one funnel and two masts

SS Caserta was an Italian ocean liner named for the city of Caserta in the Campania region of Italy. She was previously known as SS Maritzburg and SS Mendoza, and was later renamed SS Venezuela. Launched in 1904 as Maritzburg for the Bucknall Line, the ship was sold to Lloyd Italiano in 1905 and renamed Mendoza. Renamed Caserta in 1914, she was placed under the Navigazione Generale Italiana banner in 1918. During World War I she was employed as a troopship carrying United States troops to France as part of the United States Navy Cruiser and Transport Force. In 1923, she was renamed Venezuela and transferred to La Veloce for South American service, but reverted to NGI control in 1924. She was scrapped in 1928.

== Early career ==
SS Maritzburg, an ocean liner with a 6,847 gross register tons (GRT), was built in 1904 by Sir W. G. Armstrong, Whitworth and Company of Newcastle upon Tyne, England. Sailing for the Bucknall Line during her first year of operation, the liner was sold in 1905 to Lloyd Italiano and renamed SS Mendoza.

Mendoza completed one trip to New York in January 1908, and two trips in September and October 1909. For the next two years, she began service to New York in May and continued through December. Beginning in May 1912, Mendoza began year-round service on the New York route, sailing opposite Taormina. In 1914, the ship was renamed SS Caserta after the city of Caserta, Italy, and continued New York service opposite Taormina.

In May 1915, Italy declared war on Austria-Hungary, and ships from New York to Italy often carried Italian immigrants returning to fight for their homeland. One voyage of Caserta was typical; she sailed from New York on 1 November carrying some 1,200 men, nearly all of whom were, according to an article in The New York Times, reservists of the Italian Army.

Before her 1 February 1916 arrival in New York, Caserta had been armed with two 3-inch (76 mm) guns mounted on her after deckhouse, and manned by two gunners mates and two assistants. Caserta had been escorted by Italian Navy torpedo boats until she reached Gibraltar. The gunners practiced from Gibraltar to the Azores by shooting at submarine-like targets—butter barrels, which had been equipped with a stick, painted gray, and tossed from the bow of the ship. Caserta, by this time the only Lloyd Italiano ship sailing to New York, completed two more roundtrips to New York before Italy joined the war against Germany in August 1916. Caserta completed two more New York roundtrips before the end of the year. Germany resumed unrestricted submarine warfare on 1 February 1917. Lloyd Italiano did not have any U.S. passenger service that year, and Caserta's activities in 1917 are unknown.

== U.S. Troopship service ==
Beginning in May 1918, Caserta was chartered as a United States troop transport and attached to the United States Navy Cruiser and Transport Force.

Caserta departed New York 10 May 1918 on the first of five convoy voyages to Europe before the war's end—carrying elements of the U.S. 4th Infantry Division's 47th Infantry Regiment, who called her a "cattle boat"—and accompanied by U.S. Navy transports President Lincoln, Covington, Rijndam, UK troopship Dwinsk, and Italian steamship Dante Alighieri. This group rendezvoused with a similar group that left Newport News, Virginia, the same day, consisting of American transports Lenape, Pastores, Wilhelmina, Princess Matoika, Antigone, and Susquehanna, the UK steamship Kursk, and the Italian Duca d'Aosta. American cruiser Frederick served as escort for the assembled ships, which were the 35th U.S. convoy of the war. On 20 May, the convoy sighted and fired on a "submarine" that turned out to be a bucket; the next day escort Frederick left the convoy after being relieved by nine destroyers. Three days later the convoy sighted land at 06:30 and anchored at Brest that afternoon.

Caserta's next convoy left Newport News on 23 June and consisted of the Italian steamship Duca d'Aosta, Re d'Italia, the French Patria, and American transports Pocahontas and Susquehanna. Accompanied by Montana, South Dakota, Huntington, Gregory, and Fairfax, the convoy reached France on 5 July. Caserta returned to Virginia on 21 July with Re d'Italia.

Caserta sailed again for France on 26 July with Pocahontas, Susquehanna, and Duca d'Aosta from Newport News, and met up with U.S. Navy transports Finland, and Kroonland, and steamship Taormina—Caserta's old Lloyd Italiano line mate—that had sailed the same day from New York. Cruisers Pueblo and Huntington, and destroyers Rathburne and Colhoun ushered the transports to France, where they arrived on 7 August. Caserta arrived back in the United States in late August.

The Italian liner began her next crossing on 30 August when she sailed from Newport News with USS America and Duca d'Aosta to join the New York contingent of Kroonland Susquehanna, Harrisburg and Plattsburg. Caserta's convoy was escorted by Frederick and Colhoun.

At 20:00 on 7 October, Caserta departed New York on her fifth Navy voyage with 1,577 men—including parts of the Twenty-ninth Engineers—and joined Kroonland and UK steamship Euripides in rendezvousing with Tenadores, Susquehanna, America, and UK troopship Czar from Newport News. Cruisers Seattle and Rochester, and destroyers Murray and Fairfax served as convoy escorts for the group, which arrived in France on 20 October. Caserta headed back to New York, arriving there on 9 November.

After the Armistice, Caserta was employed to return troops to the United States. In February 1919, she carried home 1,500 American troops, including the entire 63rd Artillery, Coastal Artillery Corps. John Brown, a private in the 63rd Artillery kept a diary in which he described his journey home aboard Caserta in February 1919. Departing from Marseille in the evening of 6 February, the transport arrived at Gibraltar three days later, where she anchored to wait for a load of coal for the journey home. After four days, the ship was underway, but again delayed near the Azores by storms in the Atlantic. Meals on board Caserta during the trip were not necessarily to the liking of the troops. Twice-a-day servings of "spaghetti, macaroni, or noodles" were interrupted only occasionally by non-pasta meals, such as chicken in honor of Washington's Birthday, on 22 February. The liner, nicknamed the "Macaroni Barge" by the American troops, eventually reached New York on 27 February. Also on board Caserta was 60-year-old Private Robert W. Louden of Albuquerque, New Mexico. Louden, a veteran of the Spanish–American War and the Mexican Expedition, was wounded twice in fighting in France. Contemporary news accounts called him the "oldest American to go through the war". Another passenger on board was Sultan, a former German messenger dog adopted by two U.S. Army captains when they found him in an abandoned German trench near Verdun. Caserta sailed for Gibraltar and Italy on 6 March.

Caserta made at least one more voyage with American troops when she sailed from Marseille to New York on 22 April. Among the 1,500 troops on board when the liner docked in New York on 8 May, were nearly 550 men from the 7th, 50th ("Dutch Girl"), 650th and 658th Aero Squadrons; the 50th Aero Squadron had located the "Lost Battalion" in October 1918.

== Later career ==
When Caserta resumed regular passenger service in 1919, she began sailing under the Navigazione Generale Italiana (NGI) banner; NGI, which previously had a controlling interest in Lloyd Italiano, took over completely in 1918. Caserta resumed New York service in July, which she continued, with occasional calls at Philadelphia, through the end of 1921.

In 1923, Caserta was renamed Venezuela and transferred to La Veloce Navigazione Italiana a Vapore, commonly known as La Veloce, for service between Italy and South America. Transferred back to NGI in 1924, the liner was scrapped in 1928.
