= USS Montana (ACR-13) =

Armored cruiser of the United States Navy

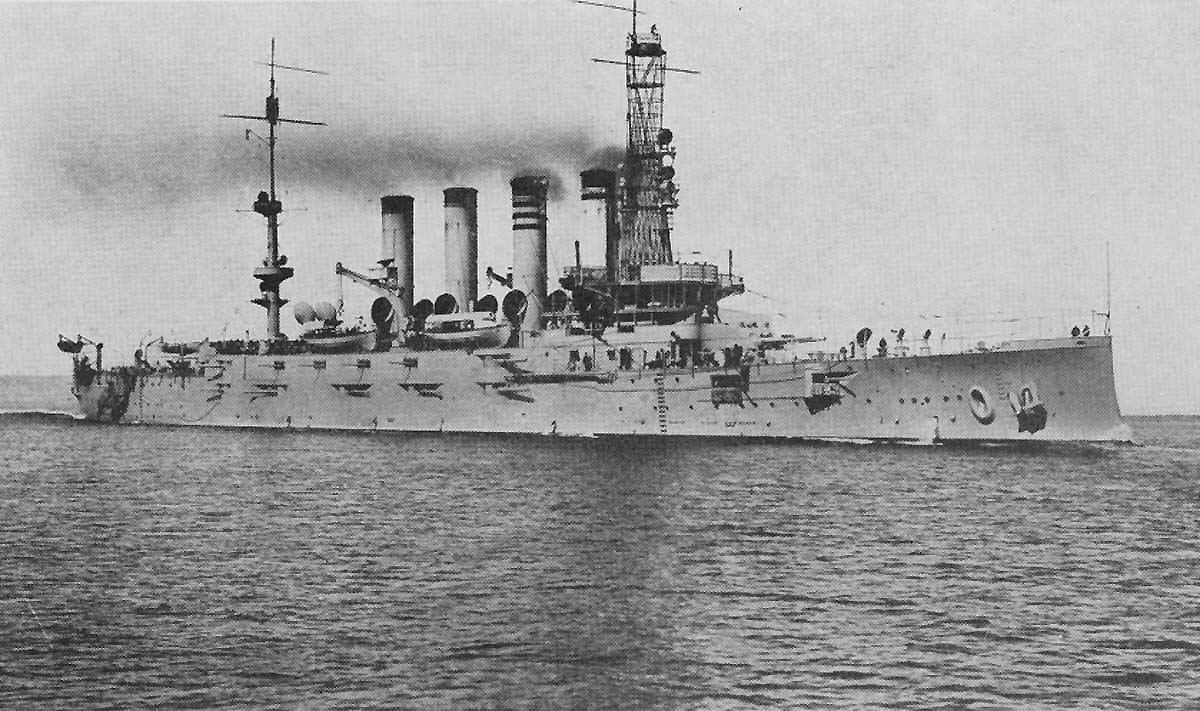
- USS Montana (ACR-13), starboard view underway, 1919.

History

United States
- Name: Montana
- Namesake: State of Montana
- Builder: Newport News Drydock & Shipbuilding Co., Newport News, Virginia
- Laid down: 29 April 1905
- Launched: 15 December 1906
- Commissioned: 21 July 1908
- Decommissioned: 2 February 1921
- Renamed: Missoula, 7 June 1920
- Stricken: 15 July 1930
- Fate: Sold 29 September 1930

General characteristics
- Class & type: Tennessee-class armored cruiser
- Displacement: 14,500 long tons (14,733 t) (standard); 15,981 long tons (16,237 t) (full load)
- Length: 504 ft 5 in (153.75 m) oa
- Beam: 72 ft 10 in (22.20 m)
- Draft: 25 ft (7.6 m)
- Installed power: 16 × Babcock & Wilcox boilers; 23,000 ihp (17,000 kW)
- Propulsion: 2 × Triple expansion steam engines
- Speed: 22 knots (41 km/h; 25 mph)
- Complement: 914
- Armament: 4 × 10 in (254 mm)/ 40 caliber Mark 3 guns; 16 × 6 in (152 mm)/50 caliber Mark 8 guns; 22 × 3 in (76 mm)/50 caliber guns; 12 × 3-pounder guns; 4 × 1-pounder guns; 4 × 21 inch (533 mm) torpedo tubes
- Armor: Belt: 5 in (127 mm); Deck: 3 in (76 mm); Turrets: 9 in (229 mm); Conning tower: 9 in

USS Montana (ACR-13/CA-13), also referred to as "Armored Cruiser No. 13", later renamed Missoula and reclassified CA-13, was a Tennessee-class armored cruiser of the United States Navy. She was built by the Newport News Drydock & Shipbuilding Co.; her keel was laid down in April 1905, she was launched in December 1906, and she was commissioned in July 1908. The final class of armored cruisers to be built for the US Navy, Montana and her sisters were armed with a main battery of four 10-inch (254 mm) guns, and they were capable of a top speed of 22 knots (41 km/h; 25 mph).

Montana spent her active duty career in the Atlantic Fleet. She made two cruises to the Mediterranean Sea to protect American citizens in the Ottoman Empire, the first in 1909 in the aftermath of the Young Turk Revolution and the second during the Balkan Wars in 1913. Montana was also involved in political unrest in Central American countries, sending landing parties ashore in Haiti and in Mexico during the Occupation of Veracruz, both in 1914.

After the United States entered World War I in April 1917, Montana was tasked with convoy escort and training ship duties. With the end of the war in November 1918 came a new task, transporting American soldiers back from the battlefields of Europe. She made six round trips to France and carried back a total of 8,800 men. Montana was then transferred to the Puget Sound Naval Yard in Washington state, where she was decommissioned and renamed Missoula. She remained in the reserve fleet until 1930, when she was stricken under the terms of the London Naval Treaty. The ship was eventually sold for scrap in 1935 and broken up.

== Design ==
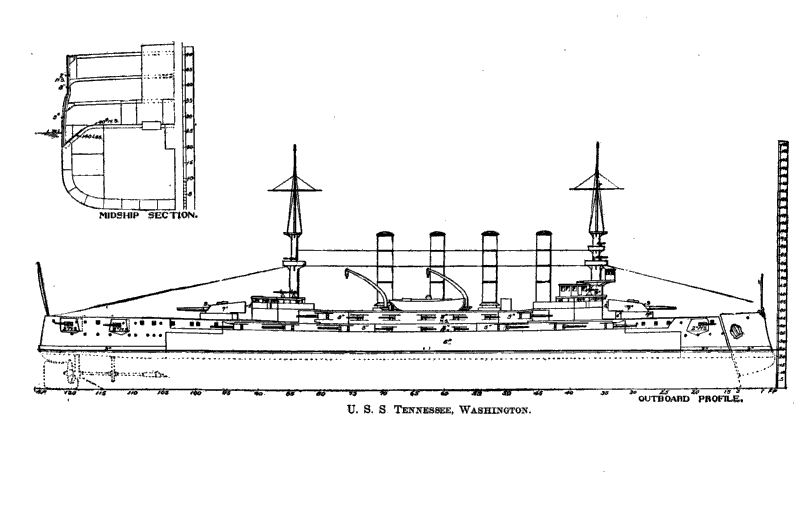
Line-drawing of a Tennessee-class cruiser, with mid-ship cross section

Montana was 504 ft 6 in (153.77 m) long overall and had beam of 72 feet 10 inches (22.20 m) and a draft of 25 ft (7.6 m). She displaced 14,500 long tons (14,700 t) normally and up to 15,981 long tons (16,237 t) at full load. The ship was propelled by two 4-cylinder, vertical triple-expansion engines, with steam provided by sixteen coal-fired Babcock & Wilcox water-tube boilers trunked into four funnels. The engines were rated at 23,000 indicated horsepower (17,000 kW), which produced a top speed of 22 knots (25 mph; 41 km/h). She had a storage capacity for up to 2,000 long tons (2,000 t) of coal, which allowed her to steam for 6,500 nautical miles (12,000 km; 7,500 mi) at a speed of 10 knots (19 km/h; 12 mph). She had a crew of 914 officers and men. Originally fitted with a pair of military masts, Montana had her foremast replaced with a cage mast in 1911.

Montana was armed with a main battery of four 10-inch (254 mm) 40-caliber Mark 3 guns in two twin gun turrets, one forward and one aft. These were supported by a secondary battery of sixteen 6-inch (152 mm) 40-caliber Mark 8 guns mounted in casemates, eight on each broadside. For defense against torpedo boats, she carried twenty-two 3-inch (76 mm) 50-caliber guns in single pedestal mounts either in casemates or sponsons in the hull. She also carried a variety of smaller guns, including twelve 3-pounder automatic guns and four 1-pounders. Like other contemporary armored cruisers, she was also armed with four 21 inches (533 mm) torpedo tubes located below the waterline in her hull. Montana was protected by a combination of Krupp cemented steel and older Harvey steel. The ship's armored belt was 5 in (127 mm) thick and the maximum thickness of the armor deck was 3 in thick. The main battery turret faces were 9 in (229 mm) thick, as were the sides of the conning tower.

== Service history ==
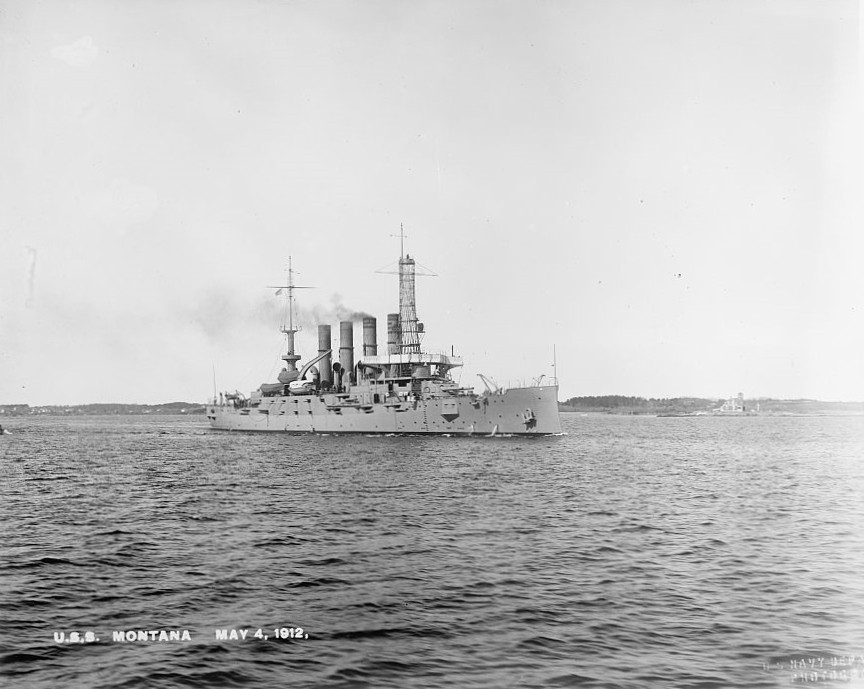
Montana on 4 May 1912

The keel for Montana was laid down at the Newport News Drydock & Shipbuilding Co. in Newport News on 29 April 1905. Her completed hull was launched on 15 December 1906, and after fitting-out work was completed, the new cruiser was commissioned into the United States Navy on 21 July 1908. She was assigned to the Atlantic Fleet and was transferred to Norfolk, Virginia. Montana steamed out of Norfolk on 5 August for a cruise off the eastern coast of the United States that lasted until 25 January 1909. On 8 October 1908 she put on a searchlight display as part of a fireworks display at Philadelphia. During the display her searchlights blinded the operator of Philadelphia Police Department steamer Visitor that then had a slight collision with a barge that "Visitor" was going to, to help put out a fire on board caused by malfunctioning fireworks. After a stop in Charleston, South Carolina, she continued south through the Caribbean Sea, arriving at Colón, Panama on 29 January. There, she joined the Special Service Squadron. This duty was interrupted twice; the first came in February, when she returned to Hampton Roads, Virginia, where she and the rest of the Atlantic Fleet greeted the Great White Fleet at the conclusion of its circumnavigation of the globe. The second came in April, owing to instability in the Ottoman Empire following the Young Turk Revolution that threatened American interests. Montana departed Guantanamo Bay, Cuba, on 2 April, when she was sent to the Mediterranean to protect Americans in the region. She remained there until 23 July, when she left Gibraltar, arriving in Boston on 3 August. She thereafter returned to her normal operations patrolling the eastern coast of the United States.

Montana departed Hampton Roads on 8 April 1910, bound for South America for the Argentina Centennial. She steamed in company with her sister ship North Carolina, eventually reaching Maldonado, Uruguay, where the two cruisers met their sister Tennessee and the armored cruiser South Dakota, which had steamed down independently. The four ships then continued on to Bahía Blanca, Argentina, for the centennial celebrations. The ship left Argentina on 30 June and arrived back in Hampton Roads on 22 July. After resuming her normal peacetime routine for the following three months, Montana was tasked with escorting President William Howard Taft aboard Tennessee for a trip to Panama. The two ships departed Charleston on 10 November for the visit, which lasted a week. On 26 July 1911, Montana was transferred to the Atlantic Reserve Fleet and she began an overhaul at the Portsmouth Navy Yard that lasted until 11 November 1912. During the overhaul, a cage mast was installed in place of her original fore military mast.

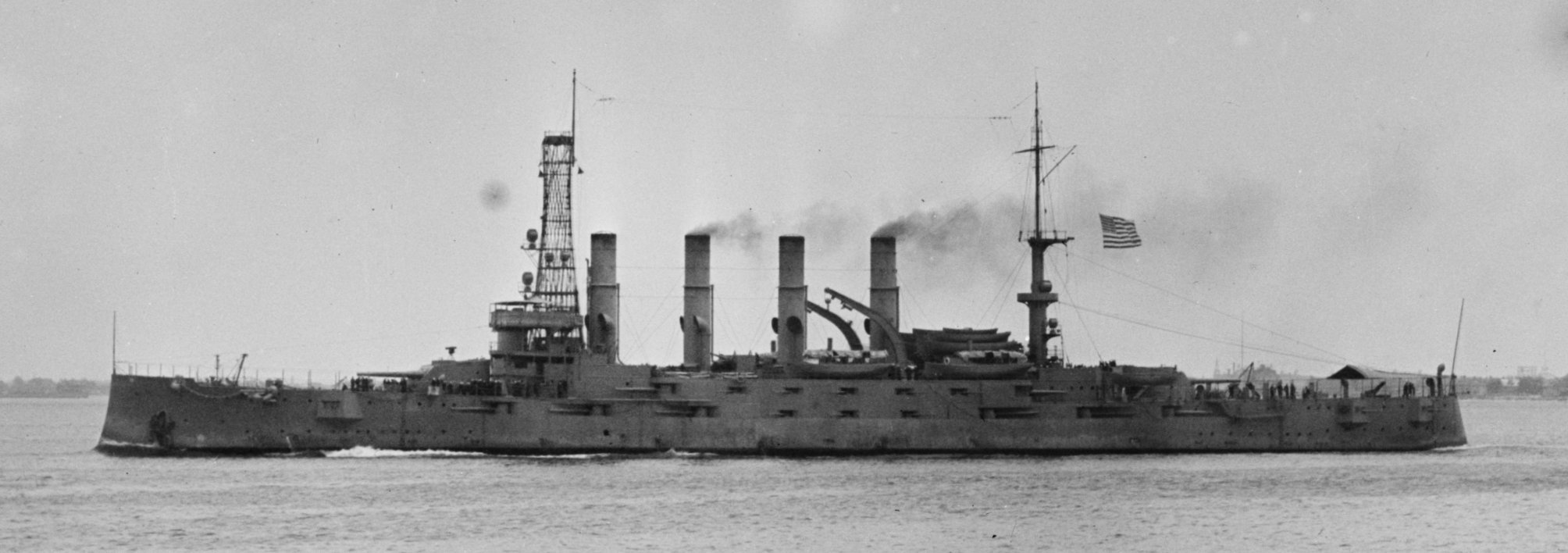
Montana underway on 10 May 1914

After returning to service in late 1912, Montana made another trip to the eastern Mediterranean, departing in December. Montana again joined Tennessee for the patrol, which was ordered in response to the Balkan Wars between the Ottoman Empire and the Balkan League, which again threatened American interests in the region. The ships operated under the command of Rear Admiral Austin M. Knight. During the trip, which lasted until June 1913, she made stops in Beirut, İskenderun, and Mersin. After returning to the United States, the ship resumed her peacetime routine of training cruises off the American east coast, as well as cruises to Mexico, Cuba, and Haiti, over the following year. During this period, on 23 January 1914, Montana was in Haiti when Michel Oreste abdicated from the presidency. Montana and the German protected cruiser SMS Vineta landed marines in Port-au-Prince to prevent rioting in the capital. Later that year, for a few days between 28 April and early May, Montana took part in the United States occupation of Veracruz, where the ship's commander, Louis McCoy Nulton, led a landing party in the city during the occupation. Montana also carried the remains on the seventeen sailors and marines who had been killed in the fighting back to New York City, arriving on 10 May. There, the Navy held a ceremony attended by President Woodrow Wilson and Secretary of the Navy Josephus Daniels.

=== World War I ===
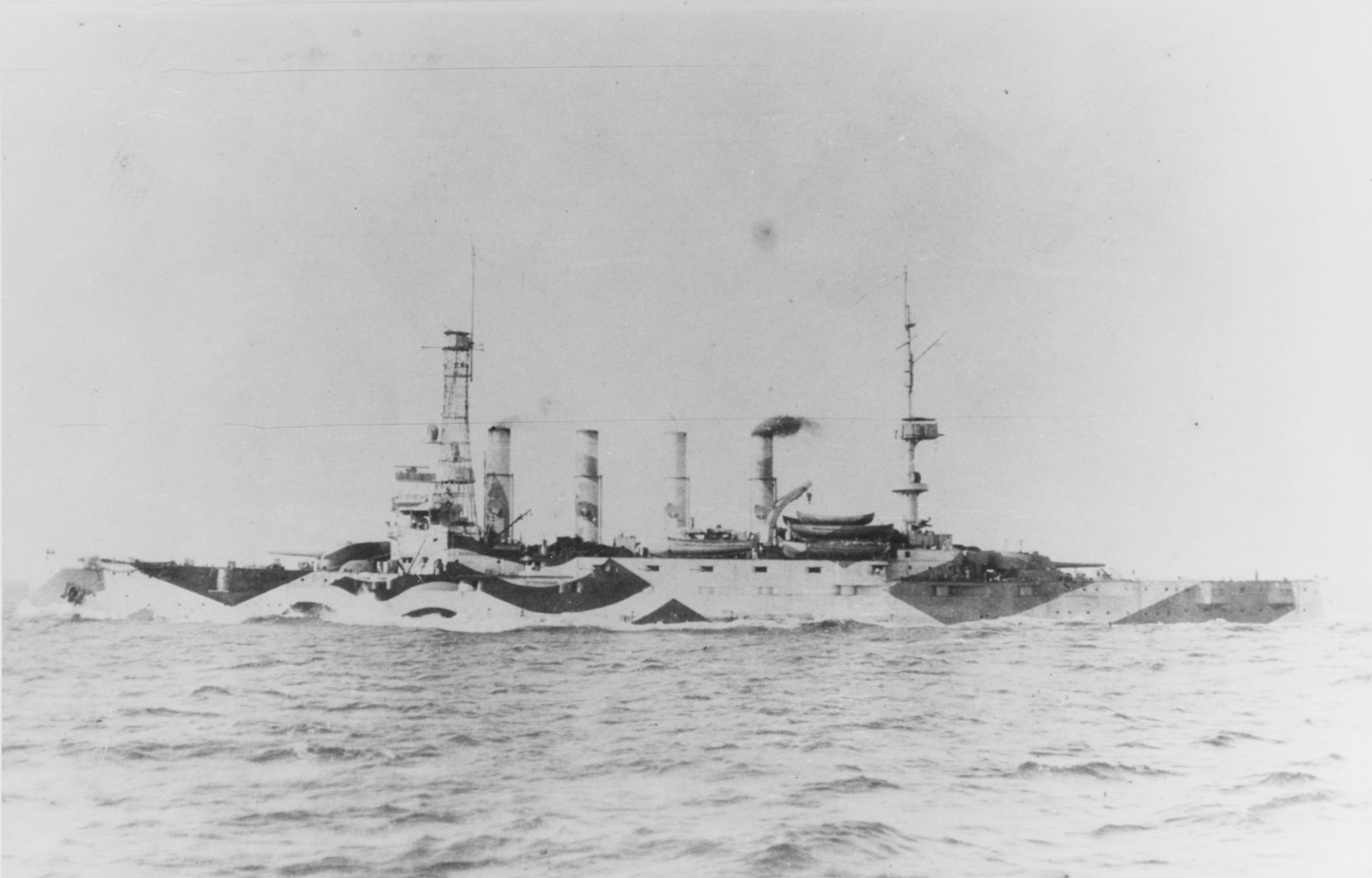
Montana underway in 1918 in dazzle camouflage

After the United States entered World War I on 6 April 1917, Montana initially was tasked with transporting men and materiel in the York River area, along with conducting training exercises. On 17 July, she was assigned to the Cruiser and Transport Force; she spent the majority of 1917 and 1918 escorting convoys from Hampton Roads, New York City, and Halifax, Nova Scotia to France. These operations included a troopship convoy of four transports—Finland, Henderson, Antilles, and San Jacinto—carrying part of the American Expeditionary Forces on 6 August 1917. In early 1918, she was briefly used as a training ship for naval cadets from the United States Naval Academy in the Chesapeake Bay. A troopship convoy followed in June 1918 in company with the cruisers South Dakota and Huntington and the destroyers Gregory and Fairfax, protecting the Italian steamers Re d'Italia, Caserta, and Duca d'Aosta, the French Patria, and American transports Pocahontas and Susquehanna.

In September 1918, Montana took part in another troopship convoy to France with the battleship Georgia, the armored cruiser North Carolina, and the destroyer Rathburne. The convoy consisted of the transports Princess Matoika, President Grant, Mongolia, Rijndam, Wilhelmina, British steamer Ascanius. The following month she joined the battleship Nebraska to escort twelve British merchant ships bound for Liverpool. Following the Allied victory in November 1918, Montana was sent to France to begin the process of transporting American soldiers back from Europe. These operations were interrupted in March 1919, when on 5 March Montana departed New York in company with the passenger ship SS George Washington, which was carrying Wilson back to France for the conclusion of the peace treaty negotiations. By July 1919, she had made six round trips between France and the United States, carrying a total of some 8,800 American soldiers.

After the conclusion of the repatriation effort, Montana was transferred to the west coast of the United States. She arrived in the Puget Sound Navy Yard in Seattle on 16 August, where she remained until 2 February 1921, when she was decommissioned. During this period of inactivity, she was renamed Missoula on 7 June 1920 so her original name could be used for one of the planned South Dakota-class battleships, and she reclassified with the hull number CA-13. Though decommissioned in 1921, the ship remained in the Navy's inventory until 15 July 1930, when she was formally stricken from the naval register, according to the terms of the London Naval Treaty, which placed aggregate tonnage limits on the cruiser fleets of the signatory countries. She was sold to John Irwin Jr. on 29 September and was eventually broken up in 1935.
