= USS Lenape =

Troop transport

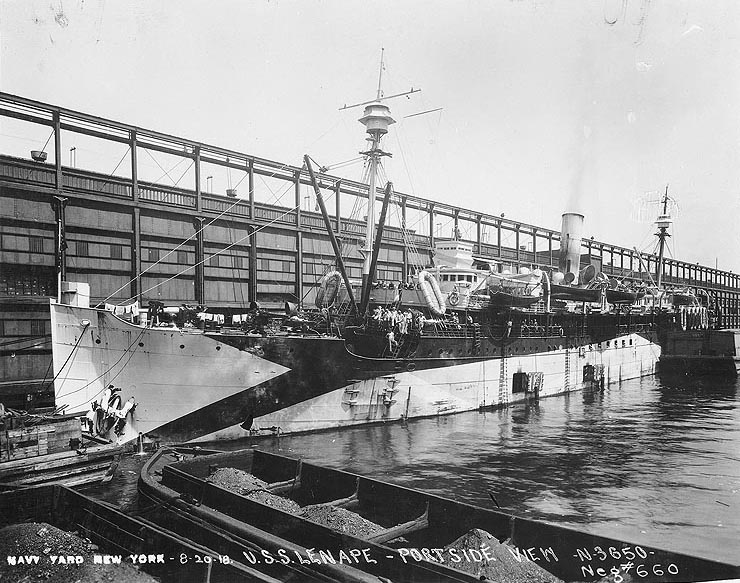
- USS Lenape (ID-2700) on 20 August 1918. Note the coal barges and Lenape's open coaling doors.

History

United States
- Name: USS Lenape (ID-2700)
- Builder: Newport News Shipbuilding Co.; Newport News, Virginia
- Launched: 1912
- Acquired: 10 April 1918
- Commissioned: 24 April 1918
- Decommissioned: before 28 October 1918
- Stricken: before 28 October 1918
- Fate: returned to U.S. Army, 28 October 1918

General characteristics
- Tonnage: 3,389 GRT
- Displacement: 7,000 t
- Length: 398 ft (121 m)
- Beam: 50 ft (15 m)
- Draft: 18 ft 6 in (5.64 m)
- Speed: 15 knots (28 km/h)
- Troops: 1,200; 1,900 (after Armistice)
- Complement: 226
- Armament: 1 × 5-inch (130 mm) gun; 1 × 3-inch (76 mm) gun

USS Lenape (ID-2700) was a troop transport for the United States Navy in 1918, during World War I. She was launched in 1912 as SS Lenape, a passenger steamer for the Clyde Line. After the entry of the United States into World War I in 1917, she was chartered by the United States Army as transport USAT Lenape. After her Navy service ended in October 1918, she was returned to the Army.

== Early career ==
Lenape was launched by Newport News Shipbuilding Co. of Newport News, Virginia, in 1912 for the Clyde Steamship Company, known as the Clyde Line. She operated as a passenger steamer on the East Coast of the United States, typically on a New York City–Charleston–Jacksonville route.

After the United States declared war on Germany, the units that comprised the American Expeditionary Force (AEF) were selected in early May and ordered to Europe within 30 days. The Army, needing transports to get the men and materiel to France, re-formed the Army Transport Service. A committee of shipping executives pored over registries of American shipping and, on 28 May 1917, selected Lenape and thirteen other American ships that were sufficiently fast, could carry enough coal in their bunkers for transatlantic crossings, and, most importantly, were in port or not far at sea. After Lenape discharged her last load of passengers, she was officially chartered by the Army on 1 June.

== Army career ==
Before any troop transportation could be undertaken, all of the ships had to be hastily refitted—in little more than two weeks in the case of Lenape. Of the fourteen ships, ten, including Lenape, were designated to carry human passengers; the other four were designated as animal ships. The ten ships designated to carry troops had to have all of their second- and third-class accommodations ripped out and replaced with berths for troops. Cooking and toilet facilities had to be greatly expanded to handle the large numbers of men aboard. Structural reinforcement below the platforms was required before the ships could outfit for guns at the Brooklyn Navy Yard.

The American convoy carrying the AEF was broken into four groups; Lenape was in the second group with Momus, Antilles, and escorts consisting of cruiser Birmingham, armed yacht Aphrodite, and destroyers Fanning, Burrows, Lamson. Major General William L. Sibert and the headquarters of the First Division along with the supply companies and one battalion (of three) of the 26th Infantry Regiment embarked on Lenape at New York. The ship, under the command of U.S. Navy Lieutenant Commander P. E. Dampman, departed with her group on 14 June for Brest, France, steaming at a comfortable 14-knot (26 km/h) pace. Fanning soon traded places with converted yacht Corsair from the first group, when that ship was unable to maintain the lead group's 15-knot (28 km/h) pace. A thwarted submarine attack on the first convoy group, and reports of heavy submarine activity off of Brest resulted in a change in the convoy's destination to Saint-Nazaire.

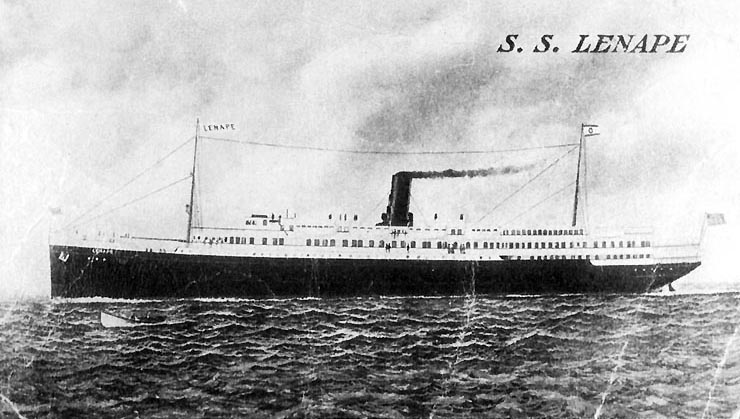
SS Lenape seen before World War I

As Lenape 's group neared France, U.S. destroyers based at Queenstown, Ireland, and French destroyers joined to escort the convoy. Just before noon 26 June, while the group was 100 nautical miles (190 km) off the coast of France, a submarine was sighted in the distance. It submerged when the escorting destroyers converged on its position, escaping without firing a shot. About two hours later another sub was sighted and chased by Cummings, one of the Queenstown destroyers. Cummings depth charged the location of the sub and noted debris and an oil slick on the surface after one explosion. The convoy arrived at Saint-Nazaire the next day.

After returning to the United States, Lenape sailed on 24 September as part of the 8th convoy with Henderson, Antilles, Finland and escorted by cruiser San Diego. According to Crowell and Wilson, the 8th group was "destined to misfortune". Three days out from New York, Lenape developed engine trouble and was compelled to return to port. On their return journeys, Antilles was torpedoed and sunk, while Finland, also torpedoed, managed to limp back to Brest.

== Navy career ==
Lenape did not make any more transatlantic crossings under Army control, and was acquired by the Navy 10 April 1918. Commissioned on 24 April under command of Commander Robert Morris, the Lenape shifted south to Newport News, Virginia, for her next convoy, her first as a commissioned Navy vessel.

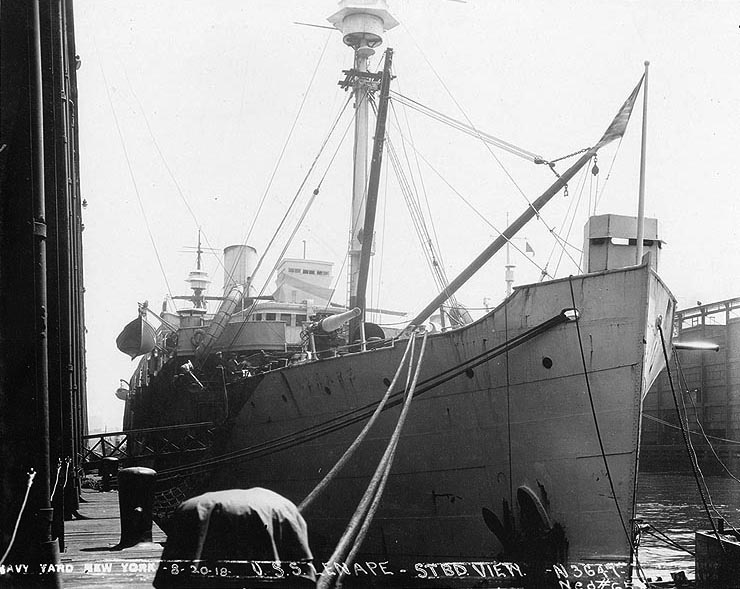
A starboard view of USS Lenape (ID-2700) at the New York Navy Yard on 20 August 1918.

Embarking a contingent of troops that included the 122nd Machine Gun Battalion of the 33rd Infantry Division, Lenape sailed at 18:30 on 10 May, accompanied by American transports Pastores, Wilhelmina, Princess Matoika, Antigone, and Susquehanna, the British steamer Kursk, and the Italian Duca d'Aosta. The group rendezvoused with a similar group that left New York the same day, consisting of President Lincoln, Covington, Rijndam, British troopship Dwinsk, and Italian steamers Caserta and Dante Alighieri. American cruiser Frederick served as escort for the assembled ships, which were the 35th U.S. convoy of the war. On 20 May, the convoy sighted and fired on a "submarine" that turned out to be a bucket; the next day escort Frederick left the convoy after being relieved by nine destroyers. Three days later the convoy sighted land at 06:30 and anchored at Brest that afternoon. Lenape sailed for Newport News and arrived there safely on 6 June with Pastores and Princess Matoika. Fate, however, was not as kind to former convoy mates President Lincoln and Dwinsk. On their return journeys they were sunk by German submarines U-90 and U-151, respectively.

Lenape set sail from Newport News on 14 June with Wilhelmina, Pastores, Princess Matoika, and British steamer Czar. On the morning of 16 June, lookouts on Princess Matoika spotted a submarine and, soon after, a torpedo heading directly for that ship. The torpedo missed her by a few yards and gunners manning the ship's 6-inch (150 mm) guns claimed a hit on the sub with their second shot. Later that morning, the Newport News ships met up with the New York portion of the convoy—which included DeKalb, Finland, Kroonland, George Washington, Covington, Rijndam, Dante Alighieri, and British steamer Vauben—and set out for France. The convoy was escorted by cruisers North Carolina and Frederick, and destroyers Stevens and Fairfax; battleship Texas and several other destroyers joined in escort duties for the group for a time. The convoy had a false alarm when a floating barrel was mistaken for submarine, but otherwise uneventfully arrived at Brest on the afternoon of 27 June. Lenape, Covington, Princess Matoika, Rijndam, George Washington, DeKalb, Wilhelmina, and Dante Alighieri left Brest as a group on 30 June. The following evening at 21:15, Covington was torpedoed by U-86 and sank the next afternoon. Lenape, Rijndam, and Dante Alighieri arrived back in the United States on 12 July.

Lenape took on board 1,853 officers and men and sailed from Hoboken, New Jersey on 18 July in the company of George Washington, Rijndam, Antigone, Ophir, and the Italian steamer Regina d'Italia. Joined by a Newport News group, all arrived safely in France on 30 July. Arriving back stateside on 13 August, Lenape sailed again from New York with 2,024 troops nine days later in convoy with President Grant, Wilhelmina, DeKalb, Rijndam, Toloa, and the French steamer Sobral.

Returning from her final cruise for the Navy on 17 September, Lenape was returned to the Army 28 October. In February 1919, Lenape was returned to the Clyde Line.

== Sinks at NYC Pier ==
On Wednesday, 12 October 1921, The New York Times reported that on the previous day, the Lenape, moored on the north side of Pier 36, North River, filled with water and sank at her pier. The accident happened between 9 and 10 a.m. Officials of the line refrained from giving out any information, and neither police nor Naval Communications Service were informed of the sinking until late that night. Only the crew were on board the steamship, and they climbed to safety on the pier before the vessel sank.

The Lenape was in the New York-Charleston-Jacksonville Clyde line service. She had just arrived on her last voyage Sunday and was due to sail again on the following Saturday.

No cargo was on board, and the damage, according to wreckers in charge of raising the vessel, was comparatively slight. Soon after the vessel went down, the Merritt & Chapman Wrecking Company was notified and sent three wrecking tugs to raise the ship.

According to a report made on the night of the accident by the wreckers, the engine room and after part of the Lenape were filled with water, but the forward holds were dry, with the bow of the steamship sticking out of the water, high and dry. It was thought by the wreckers that members of the engine room force were working on the ship seacocks and that these valves had been opened. After opening, it is believed the men found it impossible to close them again. Captain I. M. Tooker of the wrecking company said he expected to raise the steamship by the following morning. Raised, repaired, and returned to service.

== Loss by fire ==
On 18 November, 1925 she caught fire off the Delaware Capes, and was beached in Delaware Bay, a total loss. Later scrapped. All passengers and crew were rescued.
