= USS U. S. Grant =

Transport ship

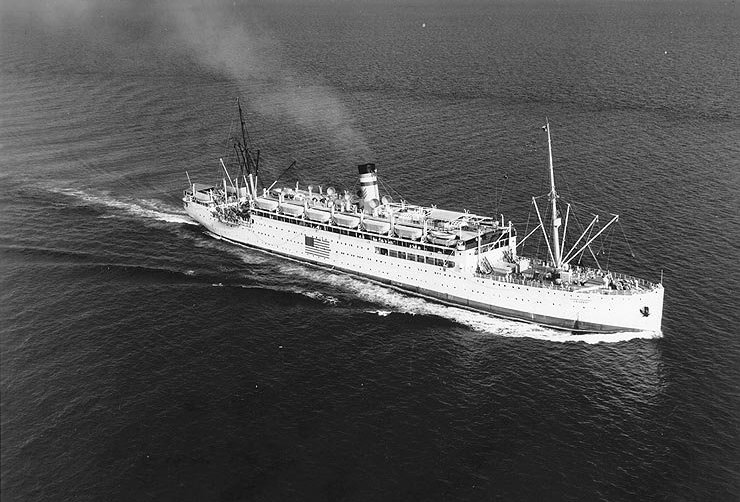
- USAT U. S. Grant underway in Manila Bay, 11 May 1938

History

United States
- Builder: Vulcan Aktiengesellschaft, Germany
- Launched: 20 July 1907
- Christened: König Wilhelm II
- Acquired: (Seized from Germany) 6 April 1917
- Commissioned: Navy: 27 Aug 1917 - 2 Sep 1919; Army: 3 Jun 1922 - 1940; Navy: 16 Jun 1941 - 14 Nov 1945
- Renamed: USS Madawaska (1917 - 1922); USS U. S. Grant (1922 - 1948)
- Stricken: 28 November 1948
- Honors and awards: One battle star for World War II service
- Fate: Sold for scrap, 24 February 1948

General characteristics
- Displacement: 15,010 tons
- Length: 508 ft 2 in
- Beam: 55 ft 3 in
- Draft: 27 ft 6 in
- Depth of hold: 31 ft 8 in
- Propulsion: Reciprocating engines, single screw, 8,000 shaft horsepower
- Speed: 15 knots
- Troops: 1,244
- Complement: 211
- Armament: (World War II) 7 x 3"/50 caliber dual purpose guns, later 1 or 2 x 5"/38 caliber guns, 4 x 3"/50 cal. guns, 2 x machine guns

USS U. S. Grant (AP-29) was a transport ship that saw service with the United States Navy in World War II. Originally a German ocean liner named König Wilhelm II, she was seized by the United States during the First World War and renamed USS Madawaska (ID-3011) in 1917 before being renamed USS U. S. Grant (AP-29) in 1922.

== World War I ==
König Wilhelm II was a steel-hulled screw steamer launched on 20 July 1907 at Stettin, Germany, by Vulcan Aktiengesellschaft. Built for the transatlantic passenger trade, König Wilhelm II operated between Hamburg, Germany, and Buenos Aires, Argentina, under the house flag of the Hamburg-Amerika Line, until the outset of World War I in 1914. Voluntarily interned at Hoboken, New Jersey, to avoid being captured by the Royal Navy, the passenger liner was seized after the United States entered the war on 6 April 1917, as were all other German vessels in American ports.

Before agents of the U.S. federal government took possession of the ship, her German crew unsuccessfully attempted to render her unusable by cracking her main steam cylinders with hydraulic jacks. Following repairs to the damaged machinery, König Wilhelm II was assigned the identification number 3011 and commissioned on 27 August 1917, Lt. Charles McCauley in temporary command pending the arrival of Comdr. Edward H. Watson.

Renamed Madawaska on 1 September, the ship was assigned to the Cruiser and Transport Force of the Atlantic Fleet. During World War I, she conducted 10 transatlantic voyages in which she carried nearly 12,000 men to Europe. After the armistice of 11 November 1918, Madawaska made seven more voyages, bringing 17,000 men home from the European theater. She completed the last of these runs upon her arrival at New York on 23 August 1919. She was decommissioned by the Navy on 2 September and simultaneously transferred to the War Department.

== Between the wars ==
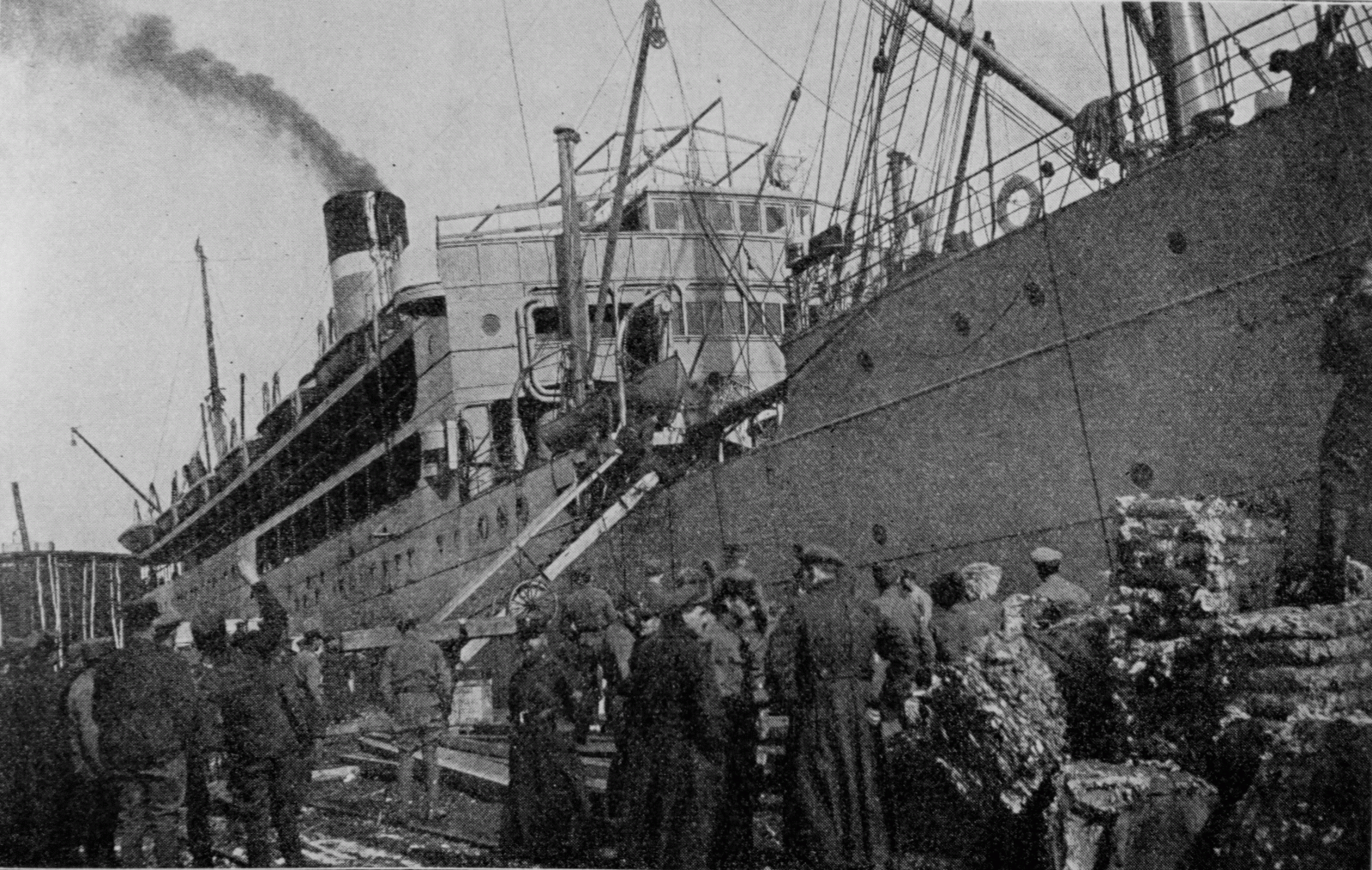
Madawaska in 1920

Sailing for the Pacific soon thereafter, Madawaska embarked elements of the Czech Legion at Vladivostok, Russia, early in 1920, as part of the evacuation of that force in the wake of the Russian Civil War in Siberia. The ship sailed to Terst, Italy, and disembarked her Czech passengers to return to their homeland. Subsequently sailing for New York, Madawaska was inactivated and turned over to the US Shipping Board for lay-up.

The following year, however, the War Department reacquired the vessel and authorized a major refit for her before she could resume active service. During this overhaul, which would last through the spring of 1922, the ship was fitted with modern marine watertube boilers for greater safety in operation and to enable the ship to make increased speed. On 3 June 1922, at Brooklyn, New York, the transport was renamed U. S. Grant; Princess Cantacuzene, wife of Major General Prince Cantacuzene, Count Speransky of Russia, and a granddaughter of General Ulysses S. Grant, christened the ship.

For almost two decades, U. S. Grant soldiered on in the Army Transport Service, maintaining a regular schedule of voyages carrying troops, passengers, and supplies along a route which included calls at San Francisco, California; Honolulu, Territory of Hawaii; Guam; Manila, Philippines; Chinwangtao and Shanghai, China; the Panama Canal Zone, and New York. For many of these years of service in the Pacific, U. S. Grant served as the sole source of refrigerated stores from the United States. Her periodic arrivals at Apra Harbor invariably produced a temporary improvement in the diet of Americans living in Guam.

=== Run aground at Guam ===
On one voyage to Guam, the transport was nearly lost. On the late afternoon of 19 May 1939, U. S. Grant ran aground on the dangerous inner reef in the as-yet unfinished harbor. Fortunately, the accident did not occur during typhoon season. The combined efforts of minesweeper USS Penguin (AM-33) and oil depot ship Robert L. Barnes (AG-27) failed to budge the ship off the coral, leading the Acting Governor of Guam, Comdr. George W. Johnson, to hit upon a plan of action in collaboration (by radio) with Capt. Richmond K. Turner, in heavy cruiser Astoria (CA-34), which was then en route to the island.

For 21 hours, members of the U.S. Naval Insular Force and local stevedores unloaded 300 tons of cargo from the grounded U. S. Grant, while much of her fuel was transferred to Robert L. Barnes and Admiral Halstead. Astoria - en route for the United States after carrying Japanese Ambassador Hiroshi Saito's ashes back to his homeland - arrived at 0630 on 21 May. She took up her assigned position, as did Penguin, Robert L. Barnes and Admiral Halstead; at 0809 U. S. Grant lurched free of the coral reef, to the accompaniment of cheers from the transport's crew. The island's newspaper, the Guam Recorder, subsequently reported in its June 1939 edition: "The short time in which the difficult operation was carried out was due to the efficient cooperation of all...involved, the Army, Navy, and Merchant Marine."

All cargo was soon reloaded, and U. S. Grant resumed her voyage. She continued under the aegis of the Army Transportation Service through 1940. Then as war clouds gathered in the Pacific and Atlantic, U. S. Grant was subsequently reacquired by the Navy. Armed with one 5-inch and four 3-inch guns (she had been unarmed while serving as an Army transport), the vessel was refitted at the Mare Island Navy Yard, Vallejo, California, and was commissioned on 16 June 1941. Continuing her service as a transport, the ship received the classification of AP-29.

== World War II ==
=== Aleutian Islands ===
U. S. Grant operated between ports on the west coast and into the Aleutian Islands through the outbreak of war in the Pacific on 7 December 1941. She carried passengers and cargo to Alaskan ports as the United States built up its defenses in that area against possible thrusts by Japan. In February and March 1942, U. S. Grant conducted voyages to the Hawaiian Islands. During the former month, she returned some 1,000 enemy aliens (mostly Japanese with a sprinkling of Germans) for placement in internment camps in the southwestern United States. Among these passengers was prisoner of war number one, Lt. Kazuo Sakamaki, whose midget submarine had run aground off Barbers Point, Oahu, on 7 December 1941.

In April, U. S. Grant resumed trips to Alaskan ports carrying troops from Seattle to American bases on the Alaskan mainland and in the Aleutians and continued this vital routine until the spring of 1942. The Battle of the Coral Sea during May 1942 convinced the Japanese that a thrust at Midway Island was imperative, in an attempt to draw out the American fleet - particularly the dwindling number of vital aircraft carriers. Consequently, a powerful Japanese fleet sailed for Midway, while a smaller task force headed northward for the Aleutians to launch a diversionary raid. Carrier-based planes from the carrier Ryujo struck Dutch Harbor, Alaska, on 3 June, and Japanese troops occupied Attu and Kiska islands on the 7th.

During this time, U. S. Grant carried troops to Kodiak, Alaska, and Cold Bay into the summer. She narrowly escaped being torpedoed while proceeding from Seattle to Dutch Harbor in convoy on 20 July. Alert lookouts picked out the tracks of two torpedoes and evasive action enabled the ship to avoid the deadly "fish" which passed close aboard, from starboard to port.

The venerable transport disembarked Army troops at Massacre Bay on 14 June 1943, three days after the initial landings on Attu. The following month, as American and Canadian troops prepared to assault Kiska, Rear Admiral Francis W. Rockwell broke his flag in U. S. Grant as Commander, Task Force 51. During this operation, U. S. Grant served as a combination transport and communications vessel. The Americans eventually discovered that the Japanese had stolen away like nomads, leaving only a few dogs to "contest" the landings, and had completed their evacuation, undetected by the Allies, by 28 July.

During the Kiska landings, the transport not only carried Army troops, but also a Mexican liaison group; a detachment of Canadian troops, and a group of civilian correspondents. After a period of repairs in late 1943, which lasted into 1944, U. S. Grant resumed coastwise voyages to Alaska.

=== Caribbean and Pacific service ===
From April to December, she shifted to the eastern Pacific to operate between Hawaii and the west coast. She often embarked medical patients to return them to the west coast from Hawaiian area hospitals. Arriving at San Francisco after one such voyage on 23 January 1945, U. S. Grant disembarked passengers and got underway the same afternoon without passengers or escort, bound for the Caribbean. Transiting the Panama Canal, after embarking passengers at Balboa, the ship operated in the Caribbean for the next six months, between the West Indies and New Orleans, Louisiana, until the end of the war.

U. S. Grant returned to Pacific duty in September, departing San Francisco on the 18th for Okinawa, via Eniwetok. She arrived at Okinawa on 12 October, in the wake of a destructive typhoon, and took on board 1,273 passengers for transportation to the United States, getting underway from the island on 21 October. Arriving at San Francisco on 7 November, U. S. Grant disembarked her passengers soon thereafter.

== Decommission ==
One week later, on 14 November, the transport was decommissioned and returned to the War Department. Her name was struck from the Navy List on 28 November. Turned over to the Maritime Commission, the erstwhile transport and veteran of two world wars was sold to the Boston Metals Company, on 24 February 1948 for scrapping.

== Awards ==
U. S. Grant received one battle star for her World War II service.
