= USS Coral =

Patrol vessel of the United States Navy

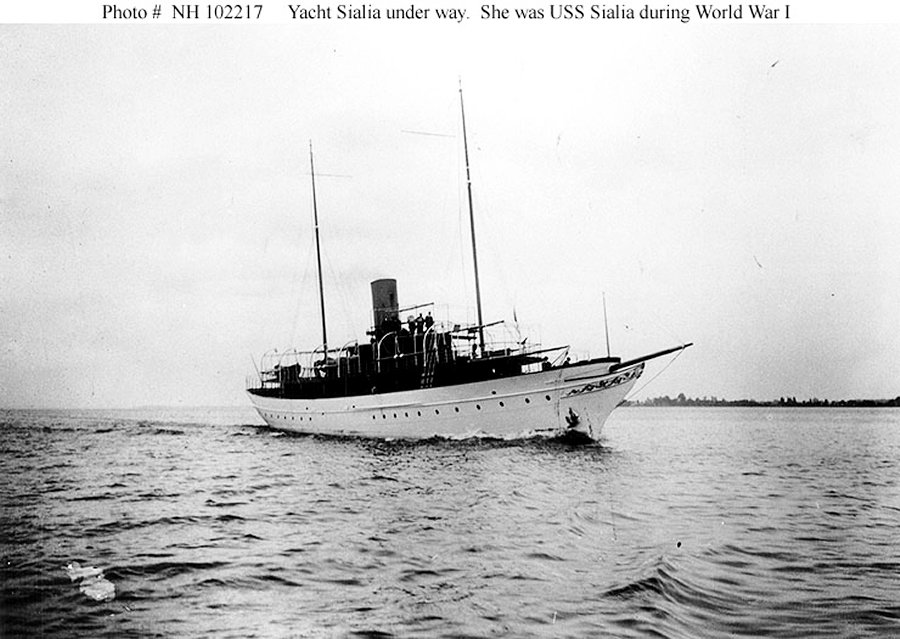
- Steam Yacht Sialia, underway prior to her World War I Navy service.

History

United States
- Name: Sialia (1914–1920)
- Namesake: Bluebird
- Owner: John K. Stewart
- Builder: Pusey and Jones, Wilmington, Delaware
- Laid down: 1914
- Completed: 1914
- Notes: sold to Henry Ford, 1917

History

United States
- Acquired: 10 June 1917
- Commissioned: 30 June 1917
- Identification: Hull symbol:SP-543; Code letters:GSPB
- Notes: 6 October 1919, Transferred to the United States Coast and Geodetic Survey
- In service: 6 October 1919
- Out of service: 6 February 1920 6 February 1920, Returned to U.S. Navy custody
- Notes: Sold 13 April 1920

History
- Acquired: 13 April 1920
- Renamed: American Clipper
- Refit: 1925, American Ship Building Company
- Notes: Sold in 1927
- Owner: A. N. Andrews Investment Corp. of New York, NY
- Acquired: 1927
- Notes: Sold in 1935
- Owner: Evan Jones of New York
- Acquired: 1935
- Notes: Sold in 1937
- Owner: Eleanor V. Andrews of Greenwich, CT
- Acquired: 1937
- Notes: Sold in 1939
- Owner: Milton C. Jackson of Philadelphia, PA
- Acquired: 1939
- Notes: Sold in 1939
- Owner: Clipper Lines, Inc. of Philadelphia (Milton C. Jackson, Treasurer)
- Acquired: 1939
- Notes: Sold to the US Navy 25 November 1940

History

United States
- Name: Coral
- Namesake: Coral
- Acquired: 25 November 1940
- Commissioned: 27 February 1941
- Decommissioned: 12 August 1943
- Commissioned: 27 August 1943
- Decommissioned: 10 September 1943
- Identification: Hull symbol:PY-15
- Fate: Sold 15 July 1947

General characteristics
- Type: Yacht (1914–1917), (1920–1940); Section Patrol (1917–1920); Patrol Yacht (1940–1943)
- Displacement: 558 long tons (567 t); 790 long tons (803 t) (1925)
- Length: 207 ft (63 m); 214 ft (65 m) (1925)
- Beam: 27 ft (8.2 m); 26 ft 7 in (8.10 m)
- Draft: 11 ft 3 in (3.43 m); 13 ft (4.0 m)
- Installed power: 2 × diesel engine; 1,500 shp (1,100 kW) (1925)
- Propulsion: 2 × screw
- Speed: 14.5 knots (26.9 km/h; 16.7 mph); 14 knots (26 km/h; 16 mph) (1925)
- Complement: 61
- Armament: 2 × 3 in (76 mm)/50 caliber guns; 2 × .30-caliber (7.62-millimeter) Lewis machine guns (removed 1941)

USS Coral (PY-15), previously USS Sialia (SP-543), was a yacht in commission in the United States Navy as a Patrol Yacht from 1940 to 1943.

== Construction, acquisition, and commissioning ==
Coral (PY-15) was built in 1913 by Pusey and Jones, Wilmington, Delaware. It served during World War I as USS Sialia (SP-543). She was re-acquired by the Navy 25 November 1940 and commissioned 27 February 1941.

== Service history ==
Coral made two Naval Reserve cruises from Philadelphia during June 1941, then sailed 30 August for Newport and inshore patrol duty until 8 October. After training at Guantanamo Bay, she served at Key West, Florida with Service Squadron 9 until decommissioned 12 August 1943. Recommissioned 27 August to escort a convoy to Norfolk, she arrived 6 September, and was again decommissioned 10 September 1943. Coral was sold 15 July 1947.
