= USS Calamares =

Cargo ship of the United States Navy

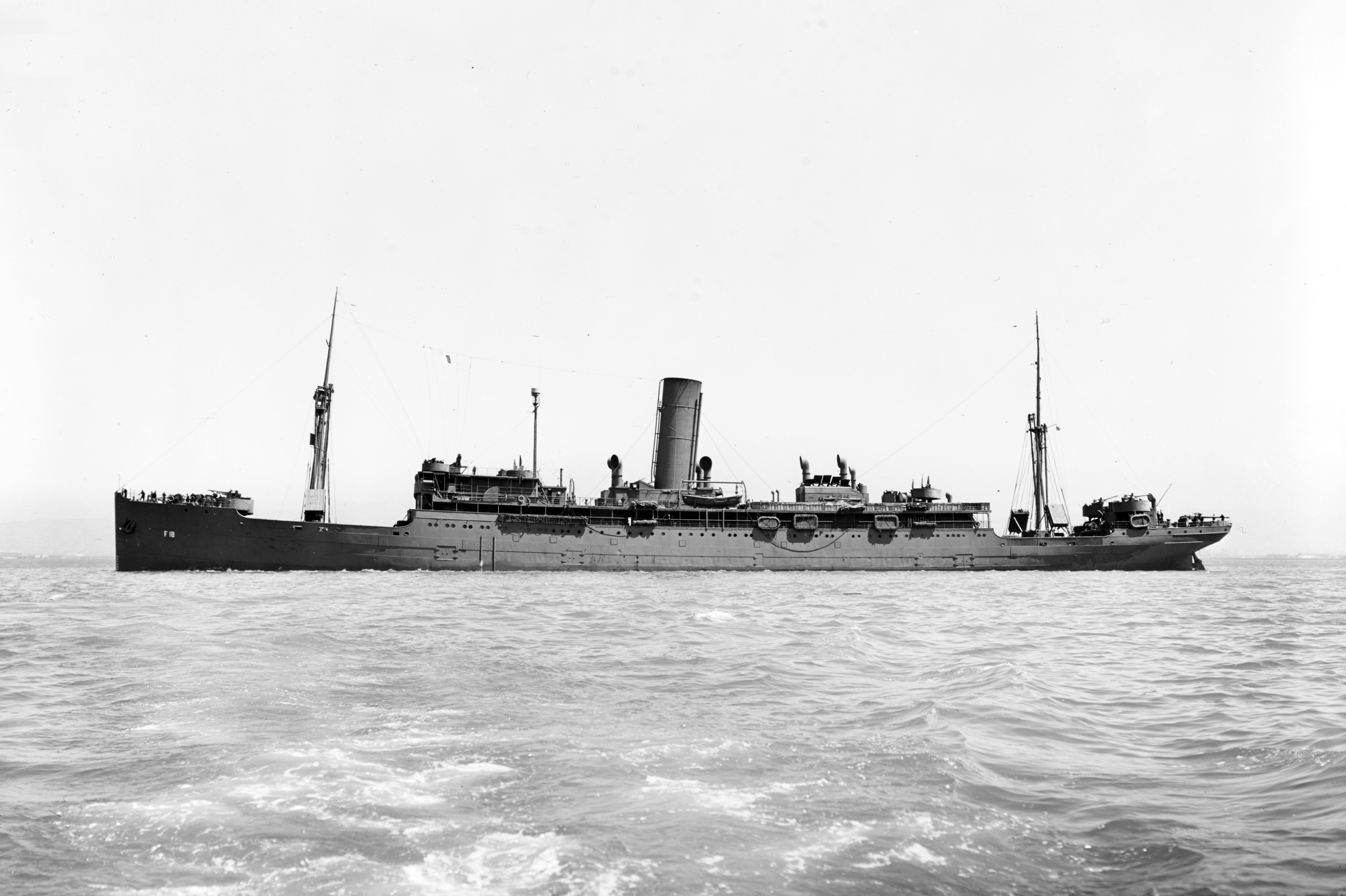
- USS Calamares in August 1943

History

United States
- Name: Calamares
- Namesake: Former name retained
- Launched: 2 September 1913
- Acquired: 1 April 1918
- Commissioned: 10 April 1918
- Decommissioned: 18 September 1919
- In service: 10 April 1943
- Out of service: 25 April 1946
- Stricken: date unknown
- Fate: Scrapped in December 1947

General characteristics
- Tonnage: 7,782 GRT
- Displacement: 12,625 t.(fl)
- Length: 486 ft 6 in (148.29 m)
- Beam: 55 ft (17 m)
- Draught: 27 ft 4 in (8.33 m)
- Propulsion: reciprocating engines; twin screws, 6,500shp
- Speed: 14.3 knots
- Complement: 40
- Armament: 1 x 5"/38 dual purpose gun mount; 4 x 3"/50 guns; 8 x 20mm AA guns

USS Calamares (AF-18) was a cargo ship acquired by the U.S. Navy for service in World War I. When World War II occurred, she was again re-commissioned into service, providing goods to units in the various oceans of the world.

Calamares (No. 3662) was built in 1913 by Workman, Clark and Company., Belfast, Northern Ireland; chartered by the U.S. Army from United Fruit Co.; transferred to the navy 1 April 1918; outfitted at New York; commissioned 10 April 1918 and reported to the U.S. Cruiser and Transport Force.

== World War I North Atlantic operations ==
Between April and October 1918 Calamares made five voyages to France as her part of the Navy's vast responsibility to transport to the American Expeditionary Force reinforcements, munitions, and supplies. On 11 October 1918 she was transferred to the Naval Overseas Transportation Service at New York, and converted to a refrigerator ship.

== End-of-war activity ==
Calamares carried perishable provisions on three voyages to France from 8 November 1918 to 12 March 1919, and then was reassigned to the Cruiser and Transport Force for service as a troop carrier. On five transatlantic voyages between 25 March and 17 August Calamares brought home more than 10,000 troops from St. Nazaire and Brest.

Calamares was decommissioned 18 September 1919, and returned to her civilian peacetime operations.

== Reactivation for duty in World War II ==
World War II required the services of every available ship, and Calamares was once more called. On 12 December 1941 the veteran ship was reacquired by the navy, classified AF-18, and converted to a provisions storeship. She was recommissioned on 10 April 1943 and reported to the U.S. Pacific Fleet.

== Pacific Theatre operations ==
Destined for a dual role as food carrier and issuing ship, Calamares cleared San Francisco, California, 23 April 1943 for Noumea, New Caledonia, where from 13 May to 11 June she issued provisions to the fleet units operating from this headquarters of the South Pacific. In June, she sailed to Auckland, New Zealand, for fresh stores, and from Noumea Calamares made a cruise of the South Pacific bases, supplying navy and army forces ashore. Returning to San Francisco in August, the storeship operated between the west coast and Pearl Harbor until 22 November, when she sailed for the South Pacific again, carrying Christmas delicacies as well as the usual stores for ships based on Funafuti, Ellice Islands, and Nouméa.

On 1 January 1944 Calamares reported to Commander, Service Force U.S. 7th Fleet, at Sydney, Australia, and until June 1945, provided vital logistic support for operations in New Guinea and the Philippines, carrying provisions from Australia, and on two occasions from San Francisco, to the operation areas.

== Post-war decommissioning ==
After hostilities ended Calamares continued to support Far East operations into 1946. Returning to Norfolk, Virginia, 1 April 1946, Calamares was decommissioned at Baltimore, Maryland, 25 April 1946, and returned to the War Shipping Administration.

== Military awards and honors ==
Calamares' crew members were authorized the following medals:

- World War I Victory Medal
- American Campaign Medal
- Asiatic–Pacific Campaign Medal
- World War II Victory Medal
- Navy Occupation Service Medal (with Asia clasp)
