= SS Dante Alighieri =

Ocean liner (1914–1949)

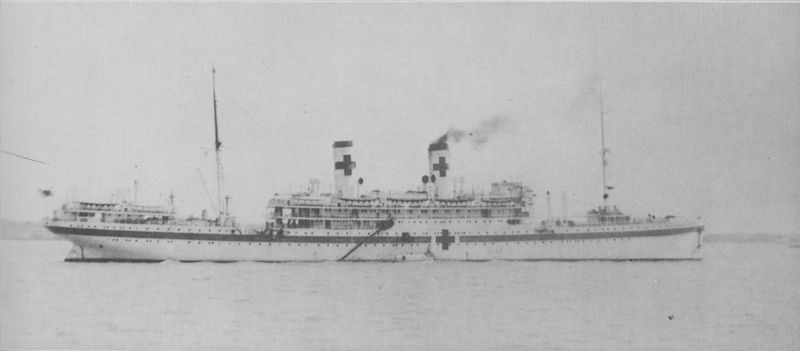

History

Italy
- Name: 1914: Dante Alighieri; 1928: Asahi Maru
- Namesake: Dante Alighieri
- Owner: 1914: Transatlantica Italiana; 1928: Nippon Yusen Kaisha
- Route: 1914–1927: Genoa–Palermo–New York
- Builder: Società Esercizio Bacini; Riva Trigoso
- Laid down: September 1914
- Launched: 28 November 1914
- Completed: 28 February 1915
- Maiden voyage: Genoa–Palermo–New York, 10 February 1915
- Fate: 5 February 1944 beached, broke in two, abandoned. Scrapped 1949

General characteristics
- Tonnage: 9,754 GRT
- Length: 503.7 ft (153.5 m)
- Beam: 59.5 ft (18.1 m)
- Propulsion: two steam engines; twin screw propellers
- Speed: 16 knots (30 km/h; 18 mph)
- Notes: 1914: two funnels, four masts; 1940: one funnel

SS Dante Alighieri was an Italian ocean liner for Transatlantica Italiana. From 1915 to 1927 the ship was in service between Italy and New York with calls at Lisbon, Gibraltar, Azores and Boston and between Italy and South America. In 1927, she was sold to Japanese firm Nippon Yusen Kaisha and renamed Asahi Maru. Operating as a hospital ship during early World War II, she later served as a transport. Asahi Maru was damaged in a collision in 1944 off the coast of Japan, beached and abandoned. The wreck was eventually scrapped in 1949.

== History ==
Dante Alighieri was built by Società Esercizio Bacini of Riva Trigoso in 1914 for Transatlantica Italiana. She was a 9,754 GRT vessel, with a 503.7-foot (153.5 m) length overall and a 59.5-foot (18.1 m) beam. She had accommodations for 100 first-class, 260 second-class, and 1,825 third-class passengers. Launched on 28 November 1914, she sailed on her maiden voyage from Genoa to Palermo and New York on 10 February 1915. After the United States entered World War I, she was chartered as a troop transport and attached to the United States Navy Cruiser and Transport Force. After the war ended, Dante Alighieri resumed her Genoa–New York service, continuing on the same route through October 1927. She departed New York for Lisbon, Naples and Genoa in November 1927. In 1928, the liner was sold to the Japanese firm of Nippon Yusen Kaisha (NYK) and renamed Asahi Maru. In 1937 she was converted into a hospital ship. In 1940, she had one of her funnels removed. On 24 January 1942, the hospital ship was hit by gunfire from the destroyer USS John D. Ford, during an American incursion on Balikpapan. On 10 November 1943 the vessel was converted to an auxiliary transport. On 5 February 1944, Asahi Maru was damaged in a collision in the Japanese Inland Sea, beached, broke in two, and abandoned. The ship's cargo was salvaged at end of February. She was scrapped in 1949.
