= USS Charleston (C-22) =

St. Louis-class cruiser of the United States Navy

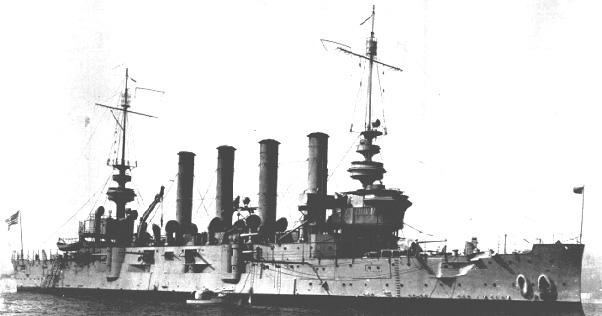
- USS Charleston (C-22), port view, undated.

History

United States
- Name: Charleston
- Namesake: City of Charleston, South Carolina
- Ordered: 7 June 1900
- Awarded: 30 March 1901
- Builder: Newport News Shipbuilding and Dry Dock Co., Newport News, Virginia
- Cost: $2,740,000 (contract price of hull and machinery)
- Laid down: 30 January 1902
- Launched: 23 January 1904
- Sponsored by: Miss H. Rhett
- Commissioned: 17 October 1905
- Decommissioned: 4 December 1923
- Reclassified: CA-19, 17 July 1920
- Identification: Hull symbol: C-22; Hull symbol: CA-19
- Fate: Sold for scrapping on 6 March 1930, subsequently used as a breakwater

General characteristics (as built)
- Class & type: St. Louis-class protected cruiser
- Displacement: 9,700 long tons (9,856 t) (standard); 10,839 long tons (11,013 t) (full load)
- Length: 426 ft 6 in (130.00 m)oa; 424 ft (129 m)pp
- Beam: 66 ft (20 m)
- Draft: 22 ft 6 in (6.86 m) (mean)
- Installed power: 12 × Babcock & Wilcox boilers; 21,000 ihp (16,000 kW)
- Propulsion: 2 × vertical triple expansion reciprocating engines; 2 × screws
- Speed: 22 knots (41 km/h; 25 mph); 22.04 knots (40.82 km/h; 25.36 mph) (Speed on Trial)
- Complement: 54 officers 624 enlisted 48 Marines
- Armament: 14 × 6 in (152 mm)/50 caliber Mark 6 Breech-loading rifles; 18 × 3 in (76 mm)/50 cal guns; 12 ×3-pounder (47 mm (1.9 in)) saluting guns; 8 × 1-pounder (37 mm (1.5 in)) rapid-fire guns; 4 × 1-pounder (37 mm) guns
- Armor: Belt armor: 4 in (100 mm); Deck (amidships): 2–3 in (51–76 mm); Shields: 4 in; Conning tower: 5 in (130 mm)

General characteristics (1921)
- Armament: 12 × 6 in/50 caliber Mark 6 breech-loading rifles; 4 × 3 in/50 caliber guns; 2 × 3 in/50 anti-aircraft guns; 4 × 3-pounder (47 mm) saluting guns

The third USS Charleston (C-22/CA-19) was a United States Navy St. Louis-class protected cruiser. She was launched 23 January 1904 by Newport News Shipbuilding and Dry Dock Co., Newport News, Virginia, sponsored by Miss Helen Whaley Rhett, and commissioned on 17 October 1905, Captain Cameron McRae Winslow in command. She was reclassified CA-19 on 17 July 1920.

== Service history ==
=== Pre-World War I ===
Charleston cruised to South American ports in the summer of 1906 with Secretary of State Elihu Root on board for good-will visits, and after disembarking the official party at Panama in September, returned to the west coast for overhaul. She cleared San Francisco on 6 December 1906 to begin service with the Pacific Squadron, sailing along the west coast from Magdalena Bay, Mexico, to Esquimalt, British Columbia, on exercises and fleet maneuvers until 10 June 1908, when she entered the Puget Sound Navy Yard to prepare for the long passage to the Asiatic Squadron. During this time, Charleston stopped in Portland, Oregon in June 1907 for the annual Portland Rose Festival. Charleston was the first U.S. Navy ship to attend the event, a tradition the Navy continues participate in to this day.

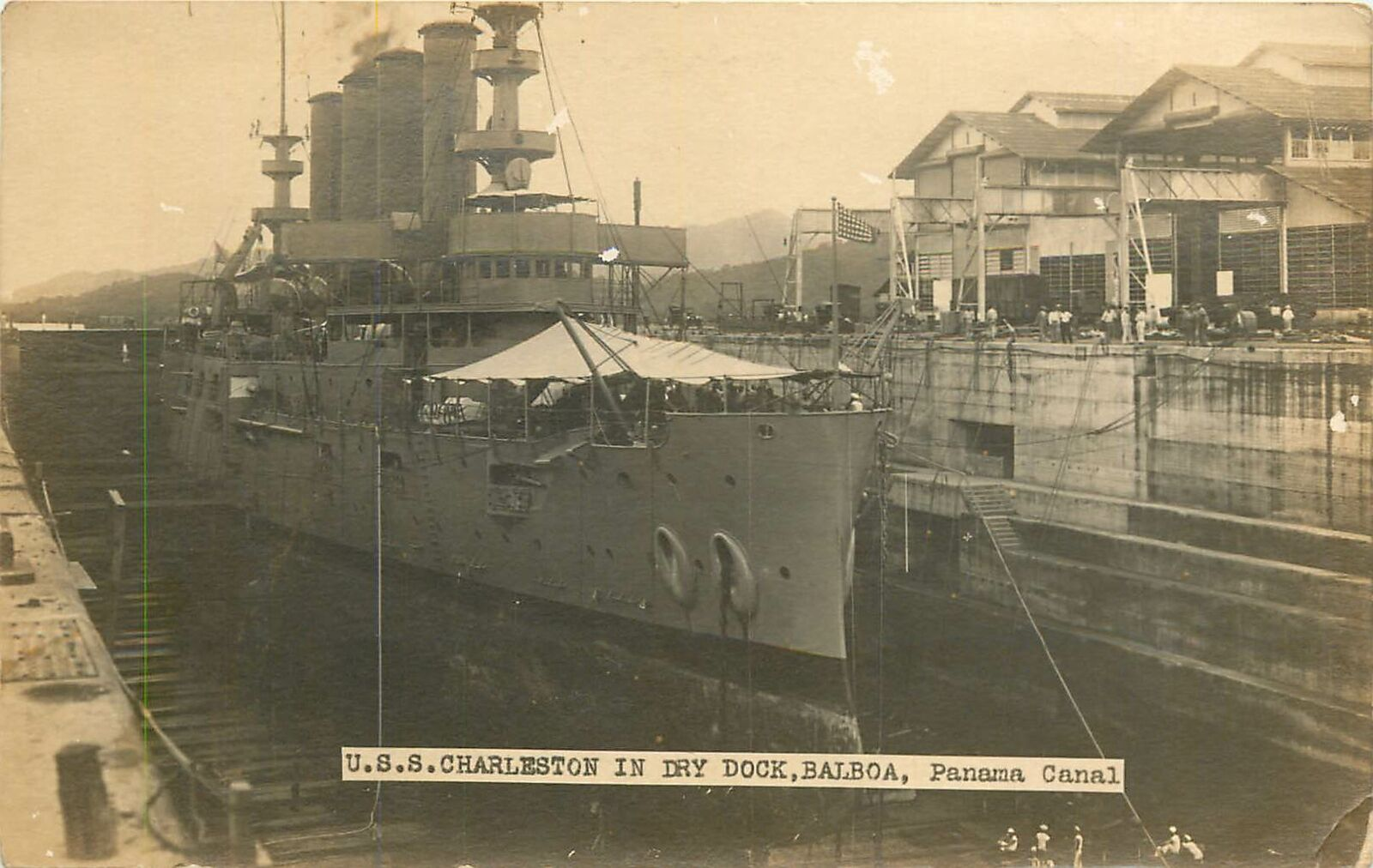
The U.S.S. Charleston is seen in this real photo postcard from the 1910s at dry dock in Panama.

Leaving Puget Sound on 28 October 1908, Charleston served in the Far East until 11 September 1910, first as flagship of 3rd Squadron, Pacific Fleet, and later, as flagship of the Asiatic Fleet. Based on Cavite, Philippines in the winter, the Fleet moved north each summer to Yantai, China, to continue exercises and visits to ports of China, Japan, Manchuria, and Russia, presenting a powerful reminder of American interest in the Far East. Returning to Bremerton, Washington, Charleston was decommissioned on 8 October 1910 at Puget Sound.

Placed in commission in reserve on 14 September 1912, Charleston joined the Pacific Reserve Fleet, remaining at Puget Sound as a receiving ship through early 1916, aside from a voyage to San Francisco in October 1913 as flagship for the Commander-in-Chief, Pacific Reserve Fleet. From 1912 through early 1916, she was receiving ship at the yard. With a new assignment as tender for the submarines based in the Panama Canal Zone, Charleston arrived at Cristobal, C.Z. on 7 May 1916, for a year of operations with submarines, reconnaissance of anchorages, and gunnery exercises.

=== World War I ===
On the day of America's entry into World War I on 6 April 1917, Charleston was placed in full commission, and early in May reported for duty with the Patrol Force in the Caribbean. Based on St. Thomas, U.S. Virgin Islands, she patrolled for commerce raiders through the month of May, then sailed north carrying Marines from Haiti to Philadelphia.

Here she readied to join the escort of the convoy carrying the first troops of the American Expeditionary Force to France, which cleared New York on 14 June, made St. Nazaire, France, after a safe passage through submarine waters on 28 June, and returned to New York on 19 July. After training naval volunteers and reserves for two weeks at Newport, Charleston cleared on 16 August for Havana, Cuba, where she supervised the sailing in tow of several former German ships to New Orleans. She next escorted a convoy from Cristobal to Bermuda, where she rendezvoused with a group of British transports, guarding their passage to Hampton Roads.

In September–October 1918, she made two convoy escort voyages to Nova Scotia, then joined the Cruiser and Transport Force, with which she made five voyages to France carrying occupation troops overseas and returning with combat veterans.

=== Decommissioning and fate ===
Charleston sailed from Philadelphia for the west coast on 23 July 1919, reaching Bremerton on 24 August. Here she was placed in reduced commission until late in 1920, when she arrived in San Diego to serve as administrative flagship for Commander, Destroyer Squadrons, Pacific Fleet. She served on this duty until 4 June 1923, when she sailed for Puget Sound Navy Yard and decommissioning on 4 December 1923. She was sold on 6 March 1930.

Charleston was stripped down to the waterline and then sold to the Powell River Company, Ltd. On 25 October 1930, the ship was towed to Powell River, British Columbia, Canada, to serve as a floating breakwater for a large logging mill. The hulk was ballasted, anchored and periodically pumped out to keep her afloat. The following year, she was joined by the hull of the cruiser Huron (formerly South Dakota). In 1961, heavy weather caused Charleston to partially flood, and her hull was towed to Kelsey Bay, on the north coast of Vancouver Island. The hulk was run ashore to serve as a breakwater, where she can be seen to this day.

== Silver service ==
On 1 January 1905, the city of Charleston, South Carolina gave a silver punch service to the ship. The service included a silver bowl with an 18-inch (460 mm) diameter that weighed nearly 19 pounds (8.6 kg). The set was designed and made by Carrington, Thomas & Co. in Charleston and included panels showing Fort Sumter, St. Michael's Episcopal Church, Fort Moultrie, City Hall, and a view of the Battery. The set included a bowl, tray, and ladle that all included the seal of the city. When the ship was decommissioned, the service was returned to Charleston where it was displayed, for a period, at the Charleston Museum; it was again given to the next USS Charleston in 1936 and again returned to the city when that ship was itself decommissioned.
