= USS South Dakota (ACR-9) =

United States Navy Pennsylvania-class armored cruiser

Coordinates: 49.869°N 124.560°W

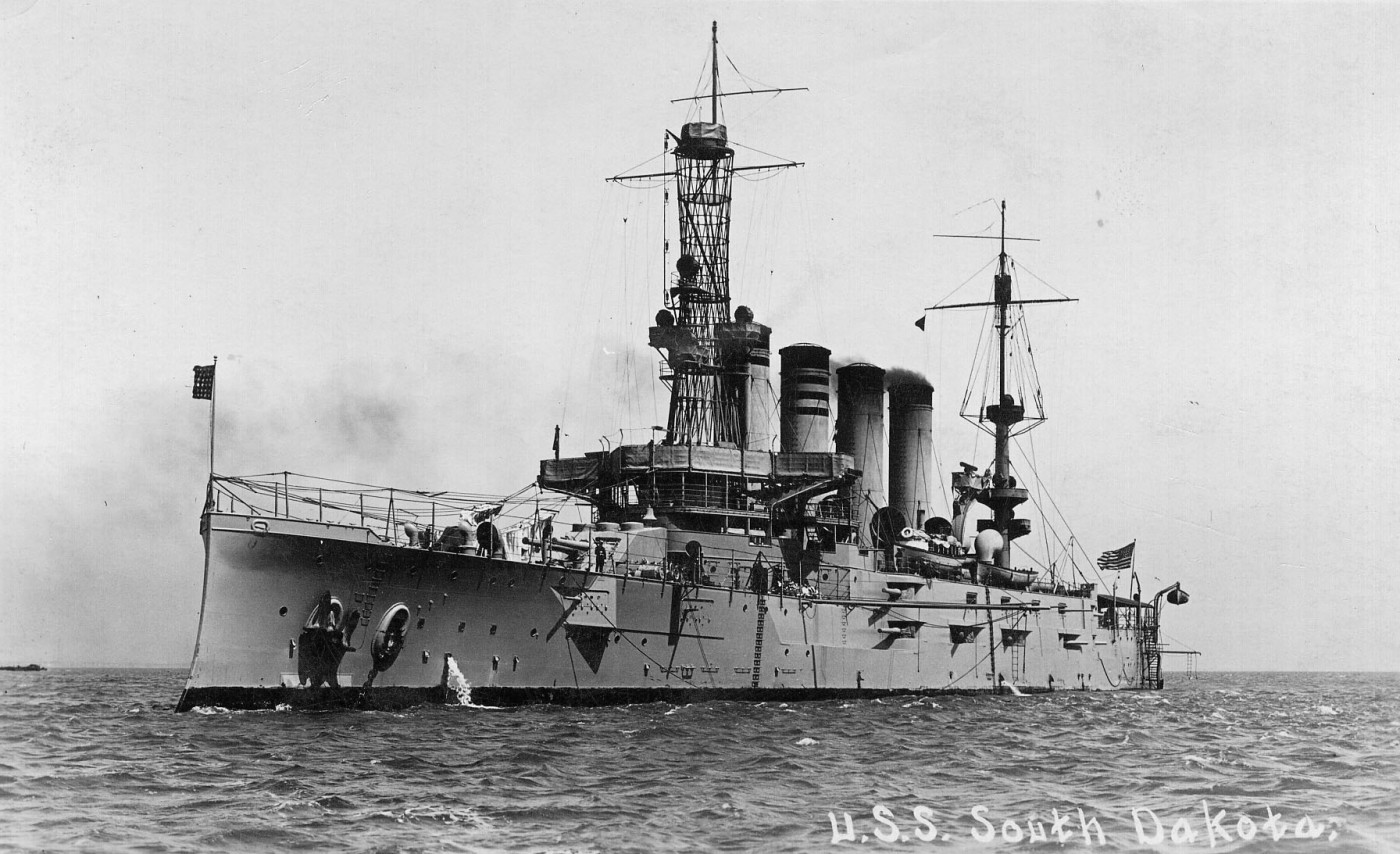
- USS South Dakota (ACR-9), port bow view at anchor, location and date unknown.

History

United States
- Name: South Dakota (1908–1920); Huron (1920–1929)
- Namesake: State of South Dakota; City of Huron, South Dakota
- Ordered: 7 June 1900
- Awarded: 10 January 1901
- Builder: Union Iron Works, San Francisco, California
- Cost: $3,750,000 (contract price of hull and machinery)
- Laid down: 30 September 1902
- Launched: 21 July 1904
- Sponsored by: Miss F. Pardee
- Commissioned: 27 January 1908
- Decommissioned: 17 June 1927
- Renamed: Huron, 7 June 1920
- Reclassified: CA-9, 17 July 1920
- Stricken: 15 November 1929
- Identification: Hull symbol: ACR-9; Hull symbol: CA-9
- Fate: Sold for scrap, 11 February 1930, in accordance with the provisions of the London Naval Treaty; Subsequently sold to the Powell River Co., British Columbia, Canada to be used as a breakwater

General characteristics (as built)
- Class & type: Pennsylvania-class armored cruiser
- Displacement: 13,680 long tons (13,900 t) (standard); 15,138 long tons (15,381 t) (full load)
- Length: 503 ft 11 in (153.59 m) oa; 502 ft (153 m) pp
- Beam: 69 ft 6 in (21.18 m)
- Draft: 24 ft 1 in (7.34 m) (mean)
- Installed power: 16 × Babcock & Wilcox boilers; 23,000 ihp (17,000 kW)
- Propulsion: 2 × vertical triple expansion reciprocating engines; 2 × screws
- Speed: 22 kn (41 km/h; 25 mph); 22.15 kn (41.02 km/h; 25.49 mph) (Speed on Trials)
- Complement: 80 officers 745 enlisted 64 Marines
- Armament: 4 × 8 in (203 mm)/40 caliber Mark 5 breech-loading (BL) rifles(2×2); 14 × 6 in (152 mm)/50 cal Mark 6 BL rifles; 18 × 3 in (76 mm)/50 cal rapid-fire guns; 12 × 3-pounder (47 mm (1.9 in)) Driggs-Schroeder guns; 2 × 1-pounder (37 mm (1.5 in)) Driggs-Schroeder saluting guns; 2 × 18 inch (450 mm) torpedo tubes
- Armor: Belt: 6 in (150 mm) (top & waterline); 5 in (130 mm) (bottom); Deck: 1 1/2 in (38 mm)- 6 in (amidships); 4 in (100 mm) (forward & aft); Barbettes: 6 in; Turrets: 6 - 6 1/2 in (170 mm); Conning Tower: 9 in (230 mm)

General characteristics (Pre-1911 Refit)
- Armament: 4 × 8 in/45 cal Mark 6 BL rifles (2×2); 14 × 6 in/50 cal Mark 6 BL rifles; 18 × 3 in/50 cal rapid-fire guns; 4 × 3-pounder (47 mm) Driggs-Schroeder saluting guns; 2 × 18 in torpedo tubes

General characteristics (Pre-1921 Refit)
- Armament: 4 × 8 in/45 caliber Mark 6 BL rifles (2×2); 14 × 6 in/50 Mark 6 caliber BL rifles; 10 × 3 in/50 caliber rapid-fire guns; 2 × 3 in/50 caliber anti-aircraft guns; 4 × 3-pounder (47 mm) Driggs-Schroeder saluting guns; 2 × 18 in torpedo tubes

The first USS South Dakota (ACR-9/CA-9), also referred to "Armored Cruiser No. 9", and later renamed Huron, was a United States Navy Pennsylvania-class armored cruiser.

South Dakota was laid down on 30 September 1902 by the Union Iron Works, San Francisco, California, she was launched on 21 July 1904; sponsored by Grace Herreid, daughter of Charles N. Herreid, Governor of South Dakota, and commissioned on 27 January 1908.

== Design ==
An act of Congress authorized South Dakota on 7 June 1900. The ship's hull and machinery cost a contract total of $3,750,000. Her plant consisted of vertical triple expansion engines and 16 Babcock and Wilcox boilers, which powered two propellers. Four funnels, one cage mast, and one military mast provided a distinctive silhouette. One Type J submarine signal receiving set equipped the ship. Capt. Charles E. Fox reported on board as the ship's General Inspector on 30 August 1907. The cruiser completed her preliminary acceptance on 19 November.

== Shakedown cruise ==
South Dakota began her shakedown on 3 March 1908. The ship sailed from San Francisco to Mexican waters, carrying out trials in Magdalena Bay from 8 to 10 March, and on 11 and 12 March off Isla Cedros—the ship reported her movements off the Anglicized spelling of Cerros Island, contributing to debate among international navigators concerning the designation of the island. She came about and visited San Diego, California (13–24 March). South Dakota then made a brief voyage northward along the Californian coast and put into San Pedro through the end of the month, followed by a visit to Long Beach (1–5 April), returning to San Pedro on 5 and 6 April. On 8 and 9 April, the cruiser lay off the Mare Island Light, and then visited San Francisco. South Dakota attained a speed of 22.24 kn (41.19 km/h; 25.59 mph) on trials.

She then made for the Pacific Northwest to accomplish work associated with her shakedown, reaching Port Angeles, Washington, on 12 April 1908, and (13–23 April) entering drydock at Puget Sound Navy Yard, Bremerton, Washington. South Dakota floated from the drydock and then anchored off Anacortes, Washington, from 23 to 25 April. Assigned to the Armored Cruiser Squadron, Pacific Fleet, South Dakota visited Seattle, Washington, (25–27 April). The ship returned to Puget Sound to participate in a reception for the Atlantic Fleet through 1 May. Following the reception, the cruiser completed her final acceptance trials off San Francisco through the end of May. South Dakota cruised off the west coast of the United States into August. She departed San Francisco in company with Tennessee on 24 August, arriving on 23 September at Pago Pago, Samoa.

== Service history ==
=== Pre-World War I ===
South Dakota sailed easterly courses to operate in Central and South American waters in September. In the autumn of 1909, she deployed westward with the Armored Cruiser Squadron. The force called at ports in the Admiralty Islands, the Philippines, Japan, and China, before returning to Honolulu on 31 January 1910.

In February, South Dakota joined Tennessee to form a Special Service Squadron which cruised off the Atlantic coast of South America and then returned to the Pacific late in the year.

Following operations along the Pacific coast during much of 1911, South Dakota began a cruise in December with the Armored Cruiser Squadron which took her from California to the Hawaiian Islands, the Marianas, the Philippines, and Japan. After returning to the west coast in August 1912, she participated in periodic squadron exercises until she was placed in reserve on 30 December 1913 at the Puget Sound Navy Yard.

Detached from the Reserve Force, Pacific Fleet on 17 April 1914, South Dakota made a cruise southward into Mexican waters in May and another westward to the Hawaiian Islands in August. She returned to Bremerton on 14 September and reverted to reserve status on 28 September. She was the flagship of the Reserve Force, Pacific Fleet, from 21 January 1915 until relieved by the protected cruiser Milwaukee on 5 February 1916. She remained in reduced commission through 1916, and on 5 April 1917 she was again placed in full commission.

=== World War I ===
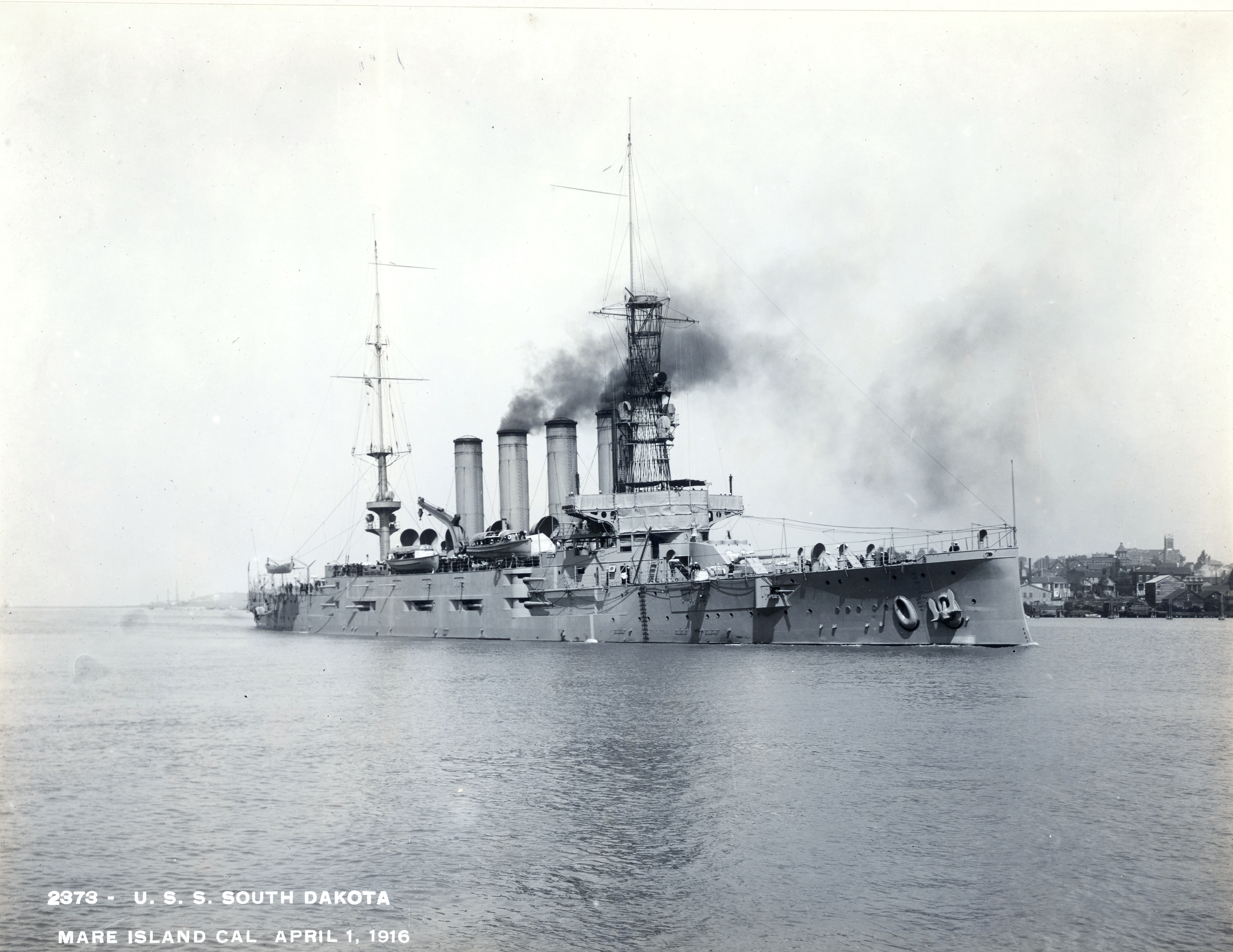
USS South Dakota in 1916

Transferred to the Atlantic after the United States entered World War I, South Dakota departed Bremerton on 12 April. She joined sister ships Pittsburgh, Pueblo, and Frederick at Colón, Panama, on 29 May; thence proceeded to the South Atlantic for patrol duty operating from Brazilian ports. On 2 November 1918, she escorted troop convoys from the east coast to the mid-Atlantic rendezvous point where British cruisers joined the convoy. Following the Armistice, South Dakota made two voyages from Brest, France, to New York, returning troops to the U.S.

=== Post-war ===
In the summer of 1919, South Dakota was ordered back to the Pacific to serve as flagship of the Asiatic Fleet, arriving at Manila on 27 October. South Dakota was renamed Huron---in order to free up her original name for use with the projected South Dakota-class battleship, South Dakota---on 7 June 1920 and was designated CA-9 on 17 July 1920. She served in the Asiatic Fleet for the next seven years, operating in Philippine waters during the winter and out of Shanghai and Yantai during the summer. On 25 February 1925, she ran aground off Palawayan Island in the Netherlands East Indies; she was refloated the next day.

Ordered home, Huron departed Manila on 31 December 1926 and arrived at the Puget Sound Navy Yard on 3 March 1927. She was decommissioned on 17 June and remained in reserve until she was struck from the Naval Vessel Register on 15 November 1929. She was sold on 11 February 1930 for scrapping, to Abe Goldberg and Co., Seattle, Wash, in accordance with the London Naval Treaty for the limitation and reduction of naval armament.

Huron was stripped down to the waterline and then sold to the Powell River Company, Ltd. In August 1931, the ship was towed to Powell River, British Columbia, Canada, to serve as a floating breakwater, known as The Hulks, for a large logging mill. She was preceded the previous year by the former cruiser Charleston. Huron was anchored into position and rainwater was periodically pumped out to ensure she remained afloat. On 18 February 1961, a storm flooded the hulk of the old cruiser, and she sank in 80 ft (24 m) of water, where she remains to this day. Coincidentally, some of the iron for her hull came from Texada Island, merely 5 mi (4.3 nmi; 8.0 km) from her Powell River resting place.
