= USS Fairfax =

Wickes-class destroyer

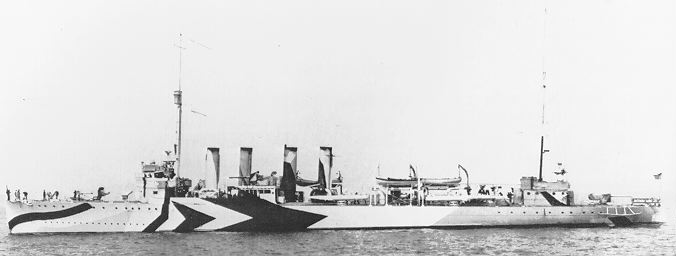
- USS Fairfax (DD-93)

History

United States
- Name: USS Fairfax
- Namesake: Donald Fairfax
- Builder: Mare Island Navy Yard
- Laid down: 10 July 1917
- Launched: 15 December 1917
- Commissioned: 6 April 1918
- Decommissioned: 19 June 1922
- Recommissioned: 1 May 1930
- Decommissioned: 21 November 1940
- Stricken: 8 January 1941
- Fate: Transferred to United Kingdom, 26 November 1940

United Kingdom
- Name: HMS Richmond
- Namesake: Richmond, North Yorkshire
- Acquired: 26 November 1940
- Commissioned: 5 December 1940
- Identification: Pennant number: G88
- Fate: Transferred to USSR, 16 July 1944

Soviet Union
- Name: Zhivuchy (Живучий / Tenacious)
- Acquired: 16 July 1944
- Fate: Returned to UK for scrapping, 23 June 1949

General characteristics
- Class & type: Wickes-class destroyer
- Displacement: 1,090 tons
- Length: 314 ft 5 in (95.83 m)
- Beam: 31 ft 8 in (9.65 m)
- Draft: 9 ft (2.7 m)
- Speed: 35 kn (65 km/h; 40 mph)
- Complement: 100 officers and enlisted
- Armament: 4 × 4 in (102 mm)/50 guns, 2 × 3 in (76 mm)/23 guns, 12 × 21 inch (533 mm) torpedo tubes

USS Fairfax (DD-93) was a Wickes-class destroyer in the United States Navy during World War I, later transferred for World War II service first to the Royal Navy as HMS Richmond (G88), a Town-class destroyer, and then to the Soviet Navy as Zhivuchy. (Note: Alternate spelling Zhivuchiy)

== Service history ==
=== USS Fairfax ===
Named in honor of Rear Admiral Donald Fairfax, she was launched 15 December 1917 by Mare Island Navy Yard; sponsored by Mrs. H. George; and commissioned 6 April 1918, Lieutenant Commander Stanford Caldwell Hooper in command.

Fairfax arrived at Hampton Roads 6 June 1918 for convoy escort duty out of Newport News. She guarded convoys of troop transports to midocean meeting points with escorts who had come out of English and French ports to meet them. Fairfax also guarded convoys moving between coastal ports, and patrolled off the coast until 16 October, when she stood down Hampton Roads bound for Brest, France, escorting a troop convoy. On 18 October, she left her convoy to rescue 86 survivors of torpedoed USS Lucia (ID-3090), a Naval Overseas Transport Service ship, and on 27 October, arrived at Brest for patrol and escort duty in European waters.

On 3 December 1918, Fairfax arrived in the Azores to meet and escort to Brest, the transport George Washington carrying President Woodrow Wilson to the Peace Conference. She sailed for home 21 December, reaching Norfolk, Virginia 8 January 1919. Her post war operations along the east coast and in the Caribbean were broken in May 1919, when she sailed to the Azores to take up station as an observer of the historic first aerial crossing of the Atlantic made by Navy seaplanes. On 19 June 1922, she was decommissioned at Philadelphia, and placed in reserve.

Recommissioned 1 May 1930, Fairfax operated primarily on training cruises for members of the Naval Reserve during the following 2 years, based at Newport, Rhode Island, and Camden, New Jersey. On 12 March 1932 she sailed from Hampton Roads for San Diego, California, arriving 26 March. On the west coast, too, her primary duty was training reservists, but she also took part in gunnery exercises and fleet problems off Mexico, Central America, and the Panama Canal Zone.

Fairfax took part in the Presidential Review taken by Franklin D. Roosevelt in San Diego in March 1933, and then sailed for the East coast, where she continued her reserve training duty. She also patrolled in Cuban waters, and in the summers of 1935, 1937, 1938, 1939, and 1940 sailed out of Annapolis training midshipmen of the Naval Academy. Between October 1935 and March 1937, she served with the Special Service Squadron out of Coco Solo and Balboa, Canal Zone, operating primarily on the Atlantic side of the Canal Zone.

The destroyer joined in representing the United States Navy at the opening of the New York City World's Fair in April 1939, and after World War II broke out in Europe that fall, operated on neutrality patrol along with her training duties. On 21 November 1940, she arrived at Halifax, Nova Scotia, where she was decommissioned 26 November, and transferred to Great Britain under the destroyers for-land-bases exchange agreement.

=== HMS Richmond ===
The former Fairfax was commissioned in the Royal Navy as HMS Richmond, with the pennant number G88, on 5 December 1940. She arrived at Plymouth, England, on 1 February 1941, undergoing a refit to better suit her for escort work. This refit was completed in March, but Richmond ran aground at Holyhead on 23 March while on passage to Liverpool, and was under repair at Southampton until June.

Following repair, Richmond joined the Newfoundland Escort Force, responsible for escorting transatlantic convoys between Newfoundland and mid-Atlantic, when British based ships took over the escort. In October 1941, the ship returned across the Atlantic for refit at Cardiff, this continuing until December that year. Richmond then joined the 27th Escort Group based at Greenock on the Clyde. On 26 March Richmond formed part of the escort for the Arctic convoy PQ 14 on the initial leg from Scotland to Iceland, but was badly damaged in collision with the merchant ship Francis Scott Key and was under repair at Liverpool until July. In September 1942, Richmond joined the Halifax, Nova Scotia based Western Local Escort Force, escorting convoys from North American ports to off Newfoundland. In February 1943 Richmond was involved in another collision, this time with the merchant ship SS Reinholt, being sent to Liverpool for repair. In June 1943, she returned to Halifax, and convoy operations along the Canadian coast, serving as part of the Royal Canadian Navy from June until December 1943, when to free her crew for more modern escorts, she returned to the United Kingdom and was laid up on the Tyne. On 16 July 1944 she was transferred to the Soviet Navy.

=== Zhivuchy ===
The former Richmond was commissioned in the Soviet Navy as Zhivuchy (rus. Живучий, "Survivable") (Note: Alternate spelling Zhivuchiy) on 24 August 1944. On 17 August 1944, Zhivuchy, as a member of the Russian Transfer Force, sailed to meet convoy JW 59. The convoy was attacked by U-boats until the convoy reached the Soviet Union on 25 August. On 22–23 November Zhivuchy was a member of the escort of convoy BK 38 comprising six transports and three tankers sailing from Archangel to Murmansk. At the beginning of December 1944, Zhivuchy was targeted by U-295 using a T5 acoustic torpedo. The torpedo missed and in response, the submarine was hunted by Zhivuchy and Deyatelny. On 6 December, Zhivuchy was among the Soviet vessels sent to augment the escort of convoy JW 62. The convoy arrived in the Soviet Union on 7 December. Before the return convoy RA 62 could sail, the Soviet Navy sent out a destroyer force, of which Zhivichy was a part of, to attack U-boats lying in wait at the entrance to Kola Inlet. During the engagement, Zhivuchy was targeted by U-997 on 9 December, which missed. The sinking of U-387 is disputed, with Soviet sources claiming Zhivuchy rammed and sunk the submarine while Rohwer claims that HMS Bamborough Castle sank the submarine using depth charges.

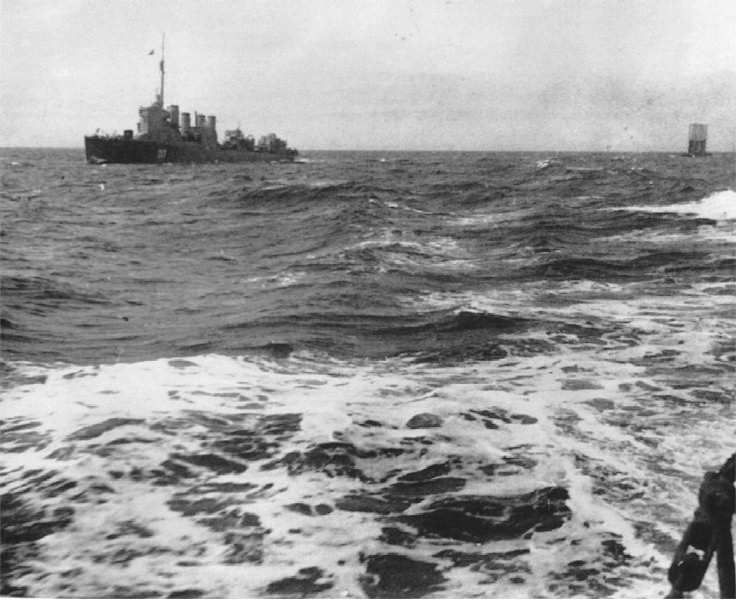
Zhivuchy underway, towing a torpedo target

From 3–5 January 1945, the Soviet convoy BK 41 sailed from Archangel to Murmansk composed of 14 ships. Zhivuchy was part of the initial escort, however on 4 January the escort was strengthened. The convoy reached port safely. On 7 January, Zhivuchy sailed with convoy JW 63 as part of its escort. Eight merchant vessels were brought from Kola Inlet to Molotovsk. On 16 January, Zhivuchy was part of the covering group for Soviet convoy KB 1 sailing from Kola Inlet to the White Sea. On 21 and 24 January Zhivuchy was among the destroyers sent to hunt U-boats between Jokanga and Kola. On 5 February Zhivuchy was among the escort for Soviet convoy BK 2 sailing from Archangel to Murmansk. On 11 February, the destroyer joined the escort of convoy JW 64 in order to escort 15 merchant vessels traveling to the White Sea. On 16 February, Zhivuchy was among the vessels sent to drive the gathered U-boats from the entrance to Kola Inlet. Zhivuchy was among the Soviet escorts for convoy RA 65 from Archangel to the Barents Sea from 21 to 25 March 1945. The Soviet Union returned the ship on 24 June 1949 to Britain, which sold her for scrap in July of that year.
