= SS Patria =

Several steamships have been named Patria.

- SS Patria (1884)
- SS Beechley (1912) – later called SS Patria
- SS Patria (1913) – sunk in the Patria disaster in 1940 in the Port of Haifa, Mandatory Palestine

== See also ==
- MV Patria (1938)
