= USS Mercy (AH-4) =

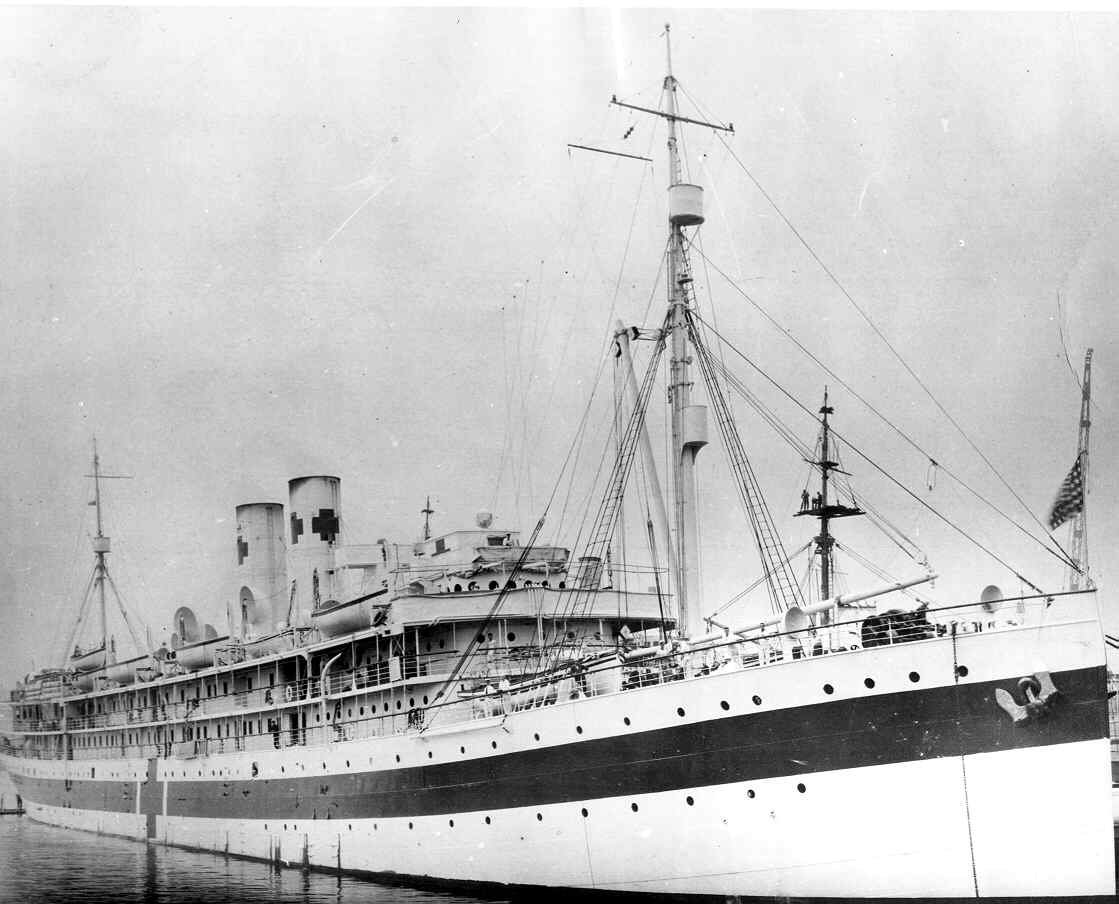
- USS Mercy (AH-4) in port

History

Ward Line
- Name: SS Saratoga
- Owner: Ward Line
- Builder: William Cramp & Sons; Philadelphia, Pennsylvania
- Launched: March 1907
- In service: before October 1907
- Fate: Requisitioned by War Department, 23 May 1917
- Out of service: 2 June 1917

History

United States Army
- Name: USAT Saratoga
- In service: 2 June 1917
- Out of service: 27 September 1917
- Fate: Sold to U.S. Navy

United States Navy
- Name: USS Mercy
- Acquired: 27 September 1917
- Renamed: Mercy, 30 October 1917
- Commissioned: 24 January 1918
- Decommissioned: 23 March 1934
- Stricken: 20 April 1938
- Fate: Sold for scrap, 16 March 1939

General characteristics
- Displacement: 9,450 tons
- Length: 429 ft 10 in (131.01 m)
- Beam: 50 ft 2 in (15.29 m)
- Draft: 23 ft 4 in (7.11 m)
- Speed: 15 knots (28 km/h; 17 mph)
- Capacity: 221 patients
- Complement: 420
- Armament: None

USS Mercy (ID-1305/AH-4) was a hospital ship in the United States Navy during World War I. She was the first U.S. Navy ship of that name. The ship was previously known as SS Saratoga, a steamer for the Ward Line on the New York to Havana route, and considered the fastest steamship in coastal trade. Before being purchased by the Navy, the ship was briefly employed as United States Army transport ship USAT Saratoga, a career that ended after a collision off Staten Island, New York.

In her Navy career, Mercy made four transatlantic round trips to France, bringing home almost 2,000 wounded men. After the end of World War I, the ship was based in Philadelphia, and briefly laid up there in 1924. The ship was decommissioned in 1934 and lent to the Federal Emergency Relief Administration, struck in 1938, and scrapped in 1939.

== SS Saratoga ==
Saratoga was launched in March 1907 by William Cramp & Sons, Philadelphia, for the Ward Line of New York. The ship was placed in service later that year on the New York to Havana route where she stayed for the next ten years. She was considered by some as the fastest steamship in the coastal trade.

Shortly after entering service, the new liner was rammed by a three-masted schooner in stormy seas. Saratoga was steaming from Havana at 16 knots (30 km/h) when the schooner hit the port quarter and raked the side, at 01:00 on 29 October 1907. Her captain could not identify the other ship, but waited, in vain, for three hours to offer assistance. Damage to Saratoga was minor, though the schooner lost some rigging from the front of the ship.

In March 1911, the captain of Saratoga, Cleveland Downs, faced legal difficulties regarding the way live turtles were stored aboard while being imported to market. Downs was arrested in New York on charges of cruelty to animals because the turtles had been stored upside down, with flippers lashed to one another; Miller contended that this was standard practice and asked that the charges be dropped. A later Saratoga captain also faced legal troubles, when, in June 1912, Frank L. Miller was arrested by Sheriff Julius Harburger in New York and forced to post a $500 appearance bond in a civil suit involving a former crewman. Miller's arrest delayed the departure of the ship by two hours.

On 16 March 1912, Saratoga stood by "within a few hundred yards" of the hulk of USS Maine when that re-floated warship was sunk in the Gulf of Mexico, allowing passengers and crew to witness the historic ship's final disposal.

On 26 October 1914 from about 19:30 to 21:00, Saratoga was steaming north 40 nautical miles (74 km) off the Virginia Capes (and 240 nautical miles (440 km) south of the Scotland Lightship) when passengers and crew saw flashes and heard reports from guns of "heavy calibre" that they thought were from a naval gun battle. Speculation at the time centered on a confrontation between German cruiser Karlsruhe—which had been sinking British vessels in the Atlantic and Caribbean areas—and one of the Royal Navy cruisers Essex or Suffolk. A follow-up news story reported that Saratoga had chanced upon U.S. Navy gunnery practice.

On 23 May 1917 Saratoga and Havana, her Ward Line sister-ship, were requisitioned by the U.S. government. On 2 June, after returning from her last commercial round trip to Cuba, Saratoga was turned over to the United States Army for service as a transport ship.

During her career as a passenger liner, Saratoga carried some notable passengers between New York and Caribbean ports. Mario García Menocal sailed from Havana to New York for "personal business" after having lost the Cuban presidential election in 1908. In 1913, Cipriano Castro, the former President of Venezuela (1899–1909), sailed to Havana for his health in 1913. A report in The New York Times speculated that Castro was going to meet with associates and "professional revolutionaries" in Havana in an attempt to regain power in Venezuela (which never occurred). In February 1914, Cardinal Farley, the Archbishop of New York from 1902 to 1918, sailed on Saratoga for a trip to The Bahamas.

== USAT Saratoga ==
After her requisition from the Ward Line, the steamer was turned over to the Army on 2 June 1917, becoming Army transport USAT Saratoga. She was hurriedly outfitted for troop transport duties and became part of the first group of the first American troop convoy to France during World War I. The convoy set out from Ambrose Light for Brest, France, at daybreak on 14 June 1917. Saratoga was accompanied by fellow Army transport ships Havana, Tenadores, and Pastores, the cruiser Seattle, transport/auxiliary cruiser DeKalb, destroyers Wilkes, Terry, Roe, and converted yacht Corsair. (Note: Corsair was unable to maintain the 15-knot (28 km/h) pace and fell back, being replaced by destroyer Fanning from the second group. See: Gleaves, pp. 41–2.)

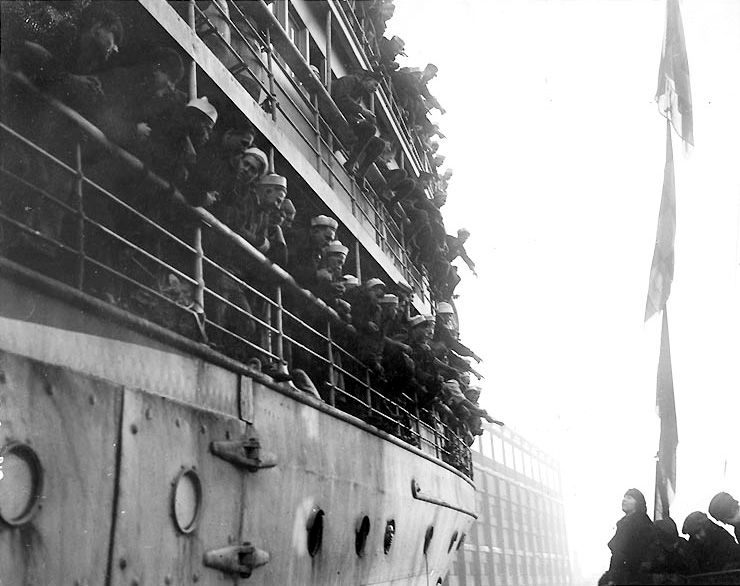
Mercy sails into New York with wounded soldiers after a stormy transatlantic voyage, 12 December 1918

At 22:15 on 22 June, some 850 nautical miles (1,570 km) from the convoy's intended destination of Brest, Saratoga’s group of the convoy was attacked by submarines. Two torpedoes passed near Havana and two torpedoes straddled DeKalb. No submarine was definitively sighted and the convoy, scattered by the alarm, reformed the next morning. The group, alerted by reports of submarine activity near Brest diverted to Saint-Nazaire and arrived on 25 June.

After sailing back to the United States, Saratoga loaded 1,200 passengers at Hoboken, New Jersey, on 30 July, a hot summer day. In preparation for sailing for France the next day, the transport sailed to an anchorage at Tompkinsville, Staten Island. Among the passengers on board were nurses of the Army's Base Hospital No. 8. To escape the sweltering heat aboard the ship, many of the nurses on board returned to their cabins after lunch and removed their heavy wool uniforms. While at anchor at about 13:30, Saratoga was rammed in the port quarter by Panama of the Panama Steamship Company after her engine room misunderstood a command from the bridge. The force of the impact buckled plating from Saratoga's rail down to the waterline, leaving a 30-foot (9.1 m) hole. Saratoga began to list almost immediately, and the abandon ship signal was given soon after. The passengers, including nurses in various states of undress, reported to their assigned lifeboats and evacuated the ship in an orderly fashion. The close proximity to shore, and the large number of smaller craft in the vicinity, allowed all on board to be rescued without loss of life or injury. Panama had only superficial damage; Saratoga raised anchor and was towed near the Morse Dry Dock & Repair Company where she was allowed to settle in the mud. The erstwhile Saratoga passengers were collected from the various rescue craft and were loaded onto Finland, where they sailed for France on 6 August. (Note: There is conflicting information in sources as to whether or not Saratoga sailed on her planned trip to France the next day. Accounts in Benson (p. 221) and Dock et al. (p. 497) make clear that the passengers from Saratoga sailed on Finland. Further, in Dock et al. (p. 497) and news accounts from both The New York Times (31 July 1917, p. 1) and Chicago Daily Tribune (31 July 1917, p. 2), it is clear that the ship sank or was allowed to sink; the latter further reports that it would "take weeks to repair" the ship. Nevertheless, Crowell and Wilson report that Saratoga sailed the following day (p. 416) as part of the fifth American convoy, consisting of Saratoga, Pastores, Tenadores, Henry R. Mallory, cruiser North Carolina, and oiler Arethusa (p. 603).)

== USS Mercy ==
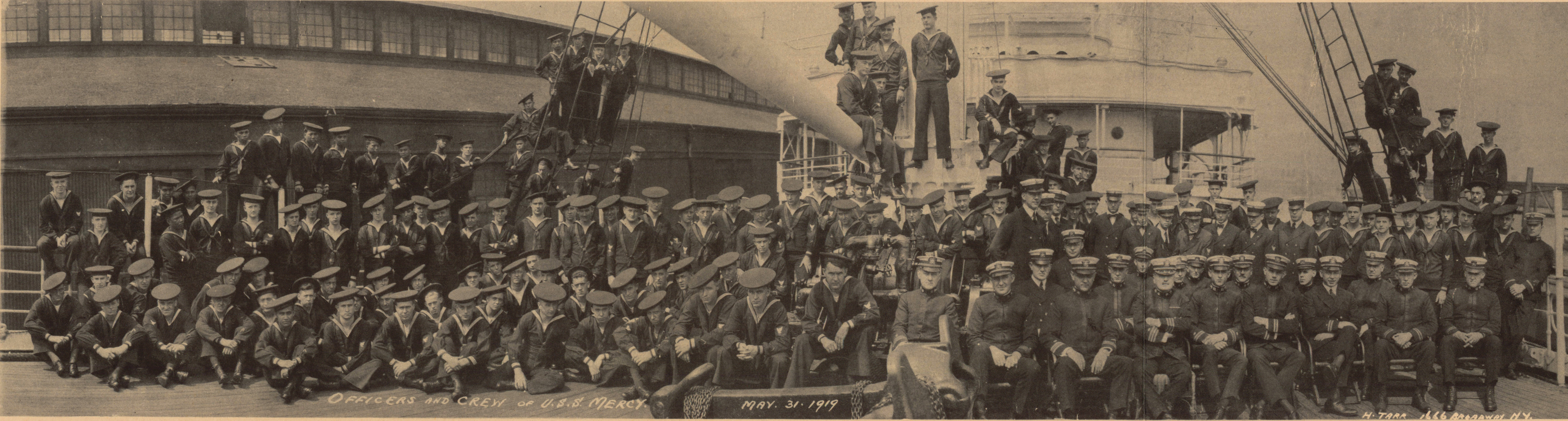
Officers and crew of USS Mercy on 31 May 1919

On 27 September 1917, the U.S. Navy purchased Saratoga from the War Department. On 30 October 1917, she began conversion to a hospital ship at the New York Navy Yard, Brooklyn, New York, and was commissioned USS Mercy on 24 January 1918. Mercy and Comfort (former Ward Line mate, Havana) were the first Navy hospital ships to have female nurses aboard. Both ships were outfitted with state-of-the-art operating rooms and X-ray labs and could accommodate 500 patients each.

Assigned to the Atlantic Fleet, Mercy operated in the Chesapeake Bay area with Yorktown, Virginia, as her home port, attending the war wounded and transporting them from ships to shore hospitals. In October 1918 she sailed for New York to join the Cruiser and Transport Service. On 3 November the hospital ship departed New York on the first of four round trips to France, returning 1,977 casualties by 25 March 1919.

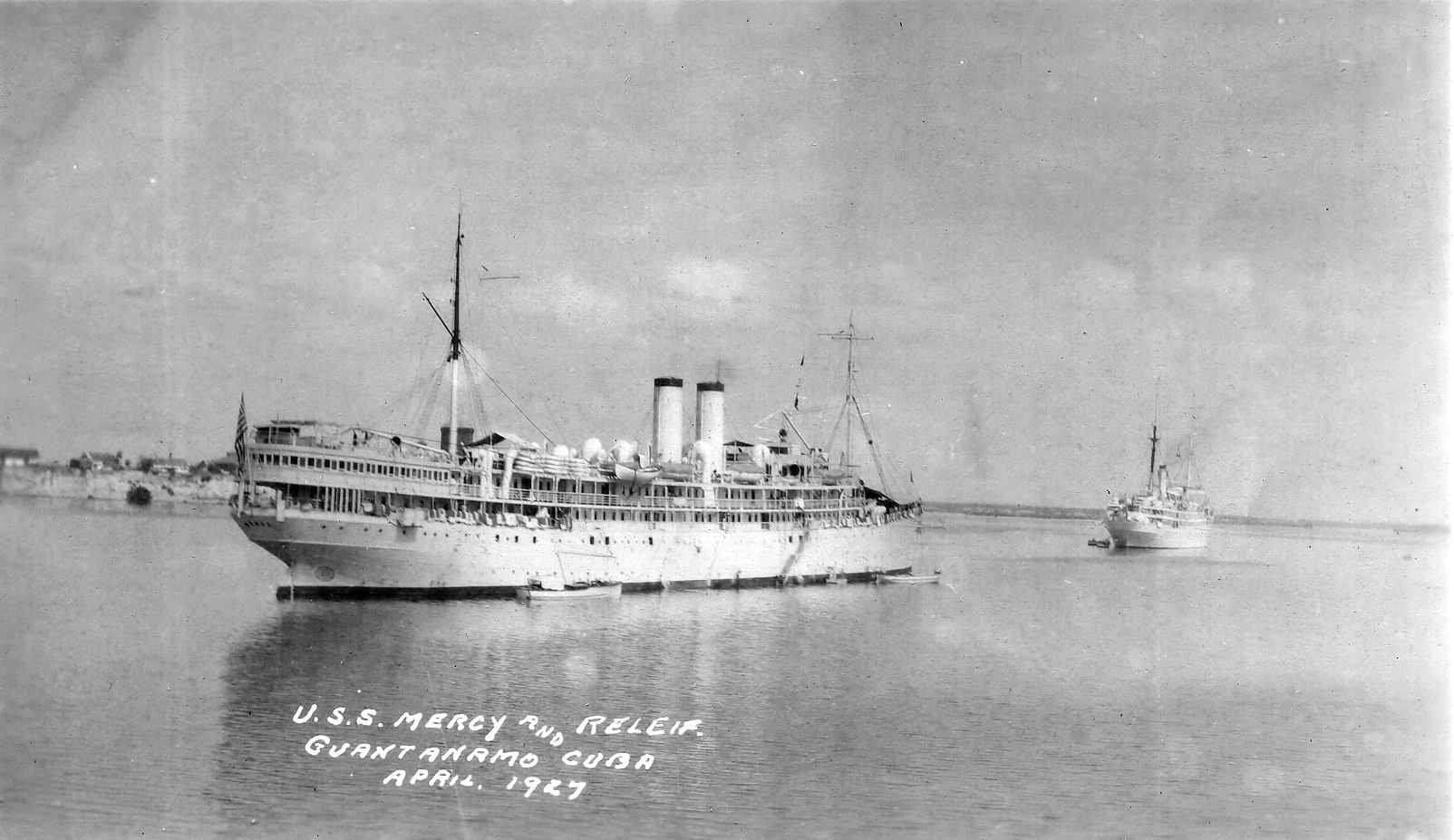
Mercy and Relief are seen at anchor in Guantánamo Bay, Cuba, in April 1927. Note the absence of hospital markings on both ships.

For most of the next 15 years following World War I, Mercy served off the east coast based at Philadelphia. In July 1920, she was redesignated "AH-4". In August 1920 she was in San Pedro, California. In October 1920 she was in San Diego, California.

From 1 December 1924, until 1 September 1925, she was in reserve at the Philadelphia Navy Yard. On 25 November she went into reduced commission, returning to full commission 1 September 1926. In early 1927, Mercy was painted white with no hospital markings, but by the time of a 1931 visit to Vancouver, the markings had been restored.

Mercy remained in commission until loaned to the Philadelphia branch of the Federal Emergency Relief Administration on 23 March 1934. Anchored at Girard Point, the ship served as a home for up to 300 homeless men. On 20 April 1938, she was struck from the Naval Vessel Register and on 16 March 1939 sold for scrapping to Boston Iron & Metals Company of Baltimore.

== Bibliography ==
- Benson, Albert Emerson, ed. (1920). Saint Mark's School in the War Against Germany. Norwood, Massachusetts: Saint Mark's School. OCLC 1904474.
- Crowell, Benedict; Robert Forrest Wilson (1921). The Road to France I: The Transportation of Troops and Military Supplies, 1917–1918 (pdf). How America Went To War. New Haven: Yale University Press. OCLC 287391.
- Dock, Lavinia L.; Sarah Elizabeth Pickett; Clara D. Noyes (1922). History of American Red Cross Nursing. New York: The Macmillan Co. OCLC 1170933.
- Gleaves, Albert (1921). A History of the Transport Service: Adventures and Experiences of United States Transports and Cruisers in the World War. New York: George H. Doran Company. OCLC 976757.
- Naval Historical Center. "Mercy". Dictionary of American Naval Fighting Ships. Navy Department, Naval History and Heritage Command.
