= SS Finland =

American-flagged ocean liner built in 1902 for the Red Star Line

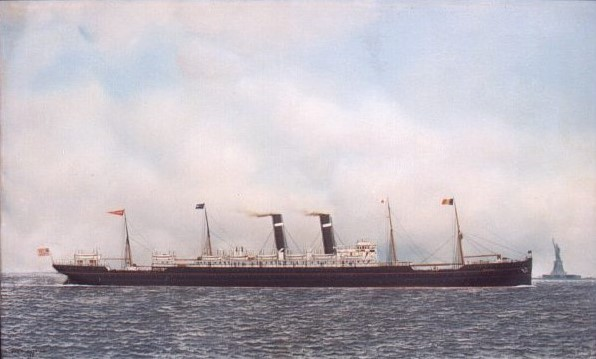
- Finland in New York Harbor 1906

History

United States
- Name: Finland
- Namesake: Finland
- Operator: Red Star Line; White Star Line (chartered); American Line (chartered); Panama Pacific Line (chartered)
- Port of registry: (United States) New York (1902–1908); (Belgium) Antwerp (1908–1911); (United States) New York (1911–1928)
- Builder: William Cramp & Sons, Philadelphia
- Yard number: 312
- Launched: 21 June 1902
- Fate: chartered by War Department for the U.S. Army

United States
- Name: USS Finland
- Acquired: 24 April 1918
- Commissioned: 26 April 1918
- Decommissioned: 15 November 1919
- Stricken: 15 November 1919
- Identification: Hull number: ID-4543
- Fate: Transferred to War Department, 15 November 1919; returned to Red Star Line

General characteristics
- Displacement: 22,400 (full)
- Length: 580 ft (180 m)
- Beam: 60 ft 2 in (18.34 m)
- Draft: 31 ft 4 in (9.55 m)
- Propulsion: 2 × triple-expansion steam engines, twin screw propellers
- Speed: 16 knots (30 km/h; 18 mph)
- Complement: 414
- Armament: 4 × 4 in (100 mm)/40 cal guns; 2 × 1-pounder gun

SS Finland was an American-flagged ocean liner built in 1902 for the Red Star Line. During World War I she served as a transport for the United States Navy named USS Finland (ID-4543). Before her Navy service in 1917, she was also USAT Finland for the United States Army.

Finland sailed for several subsidiary lines of International Mercantile Marine, including the Red Star Line, and also under charter for the White Star Line, the Panama Pacific Line, and the American Line. Sailing out of New York, she sailed primarily to ports in the United Kingdom, Belgium, and Italy. She also briefly sailed on New York to San Francisco, California, service. In 1912, Finland was chartered by the American Olympic Committee to take the U.S. team to the 1912 Summer Olympics in Stockholm, Sweden.

At the entry of the United States into World War I in April 1917, the liner was chartered by the United States Army as USAT Finland. She made five transatlantic runs under Army control ferrying troops to Europe. On the return portion of her third voyage, Finland was torpedoed by the German submarine U-93, but was able to safely return to port for repairs. In April 1918, Finland was transferred to the United States Navy and commissioned as USS Finland. She completed an additional five voyages to Europe, carrying almost 13,000 troops. After the Armistice, she returned over 32,000 troops to the United States before being decommissioned in September 1919.

After her Navy service ended, she was returned to International Mercantile Marine, and lost the USS prefix, and served on New York to Europe routes until 1923, when she returned to New York–San Francisco service. Finland was scrapped in 1928.

== Launching and early career ==
Finland was launched on 21 June 1902 by William Cramp and Sons, Philadelphia, for the Red Star Line of International Mercantile Marine (IMM). She was the sister ship to SS Kroonland, launched four months prior. Finland was 560 feet (170.7 m) long (LBP) with a beam of 60.2 feet (18.3 m), and had two funnels and four masts. Her twin three-cylinder, triple expansion steam engines drove twin screw propellers that moved her at 15 knots (28 km/h). She accommodated 342 passengers in first class, 194 in second class, and 626 in third class.

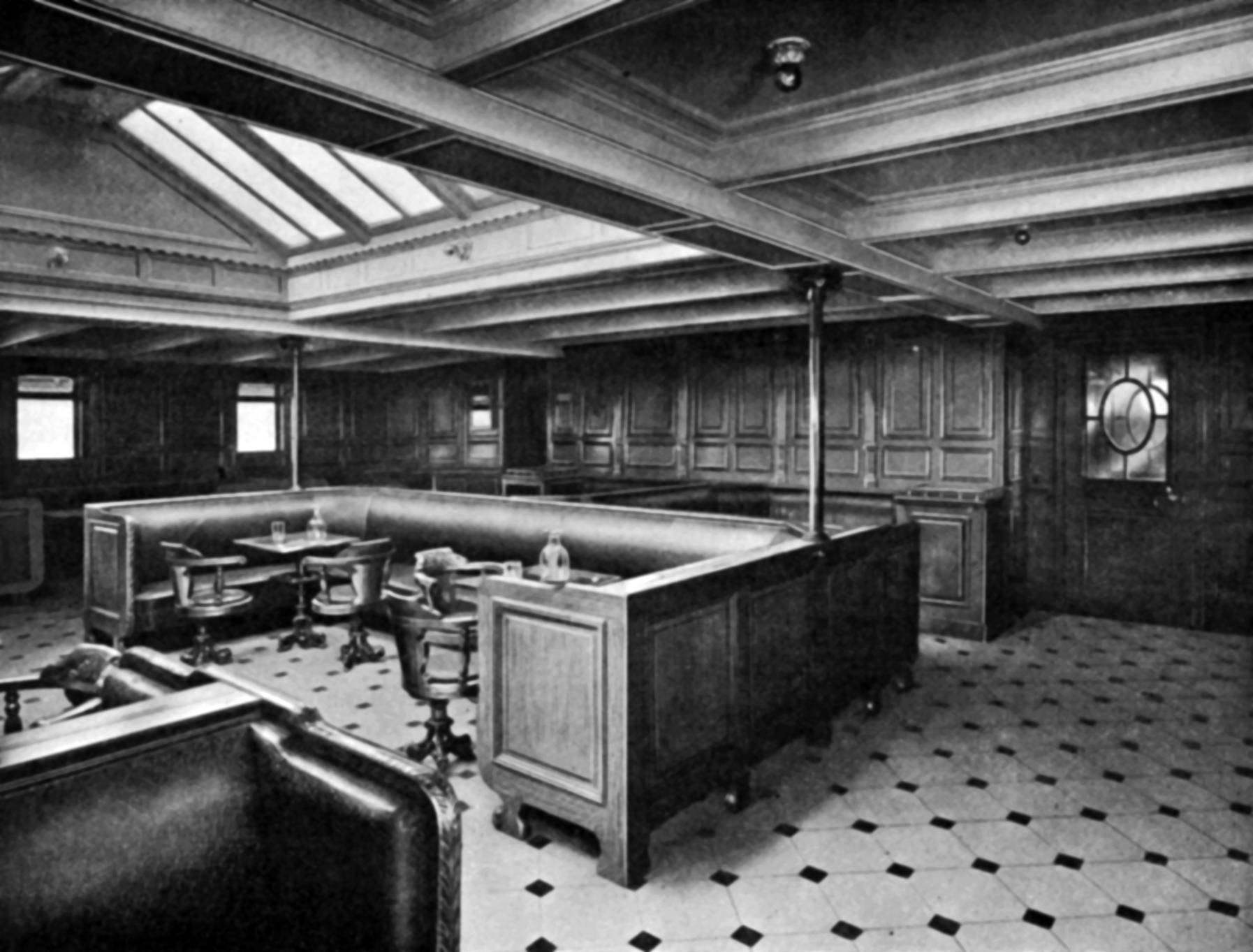
The second-class smoking room aboard Finland, c. 1909

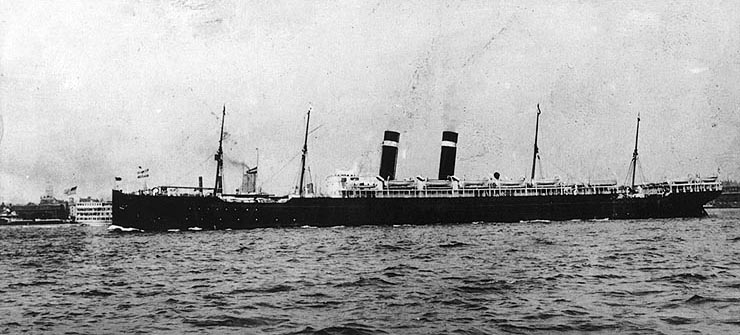
Finland underway in a U.S. port before World War I.

Finland sailed on her maiden voyage from New York to Antwerp on 4 October under the American flag, and remained on this route for the next seven years. In November 1907, as the liner neared Antwerp, a gale in the English Channel almost drove Finland ashore. The timely assistance of two tugs kept the big ship from grounding on the breakwater at Dover. By January 1909, Finland had been reflagged under the Belgian flag, but remained on the New York–Antwerp route.

On 19 January 1908, Finland collided with the Greek cargo ship SS Epirus off Terneuzen, sinking Epirus. In March 1909, the liner was chartered to the White Star Line, another IMM subsidiary, for three round-trip voyages between Naples and New York. On 25 December 1910, she rammed and sank the SS Baltique which was anchored in the Flushing Roads sheltering from a storm. Six crew were lost from Baltique. Returning to the Red Star Line's New York–Antwerp service, Finland was reflagged in January 1912, sailing under the American flag once again. During this time, noted German-American psychologist Hugo Münsterberg sailed on Finland to Europe to attend a Psychological Congress in Berlin in April 1912.

=== 1912 Olympics ===
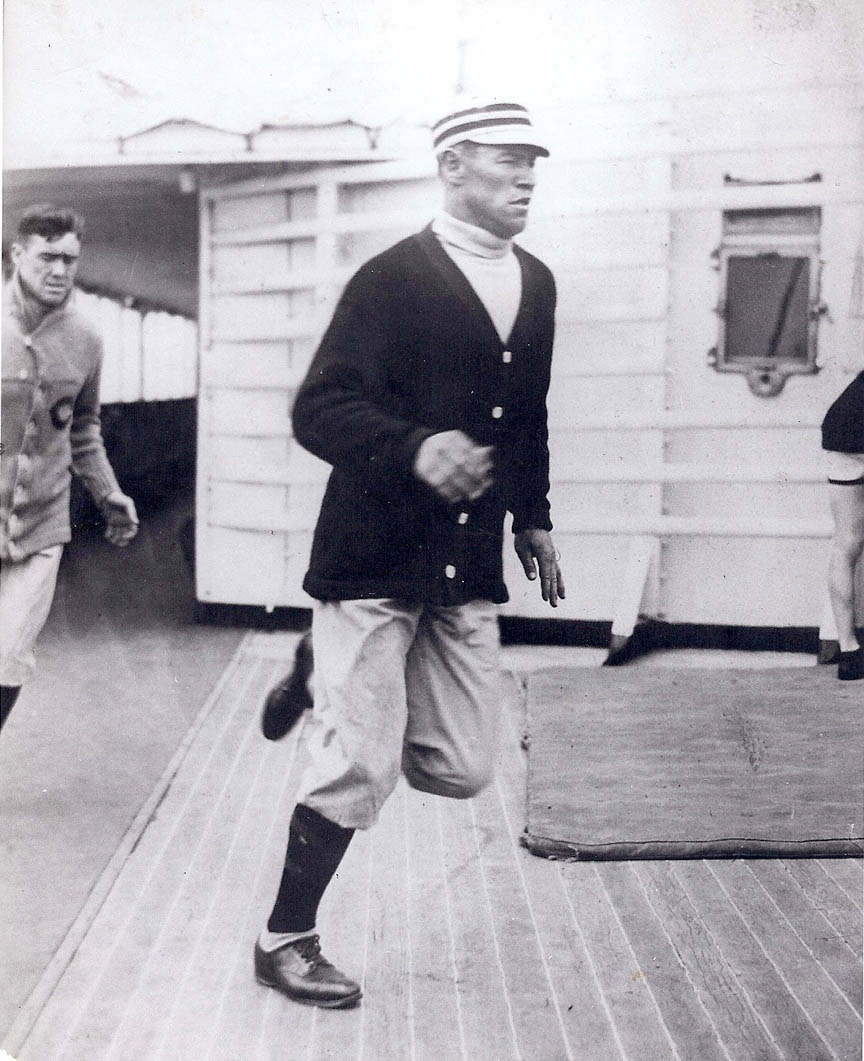

The American Olympic Committee (AOC) chartered Finland—after a proposal for sailing on Oceanic was rejected—to take the American team to the 1912 Summer Olympics in Stockholm. After setting aside rooms for all the team members, additional space aboard the ship was sold for the benefit of the AOC. The delegation of 164 athletes left New York at 09:30 on 14 June. Finland's dining rooms were divided during the voyage, so that the athletes on board would have "their own cuisine" and not be tempted to partake in "promiscuous indulgence in the great variety of food" on the ship.

The AOC, aided by Finland's crew, made several accommodations for shipboard training en route to the Games. A cork track, 100 yards (91 m) long and wide enough for two men running abreast, was installed on the top deck, especially for the sprinters. Longer distance runners would practice their starts on the track, and train by running laps around the deck, which was about one-tenth of a mile (160 m) for one circuit. Swimmers practiced in a canvas tank, 15 feet (4.6 m) long by 5 feet (1.5 m) wide, constructed on deck. While practicing their strokes, they would wear a belt suspended from an overhead rope that kept them in the middle of the tank. The cycling team worked on the forward deck with bikes secured to the ship's structure.

Some of the individual athletes came up with ideas to further their training while at sea. Discus champion James Duncan had the ship's carpenter bore a hole in the middle of a discus, through which he attached a rope tied to the ship's rail. Duncan would then throw the discus out to sea, and then haul it back in by the rope. Theodore Roosevelt Pell, the only U.S. competitor in any of the tennis events, set up a 10-foot (3 m) backstop on the after deck, practicing for hours each day.

Finland arrived at Antwerp on the morning of 24 June after a ten-day voyage over smooth seas. While the ship took on stores, the athletes completed their training at a local athletic club. Sailing at noon on 26 June, Finland reached Sweden four days later. There were no injuries during the entirety of the voyage, and, unlike the trip of the next American Olympic delegation in 1920—when the so-called "Mutiny of the Matoika" took place—no threats of a strike because of bad conditions aboard the ship.

== World War I ==
After her Olympic charter ended, Finland returned to her usual New York–Antwerp route until the outbreak of war in Europe in August 1914. The Red Star liner, still sailing from New York, shifted to call at Liverpool beginning 22 August for two roundtrips. Next moved to Mediterranean service, Finland sailed from New York to Naples and Piraeus starting in November 1914. To complete her third and final circuit to the Mediterranean, she began her last voyage from Italy back to New York on 24 March 1915.

By early May, Finland and sister ship Kroonland had both been chartered to the IMM subsidiary Panama Pacific Line for New York to San Francisco service via the Panama Canal. The trips took about 17 days each way and called at either Los Angeles or San Diego on both eastbound and westbound trips.

Finland was next chartered to the American Line, yet another IMM subsidiary, for service from New York to Falmouth and London beginning on 26 October. After completing two circuits, the liner was returned to New York–Liverpool service on 19 January 1916. At some point during this period, Finland was equipped with four 4-inch (100 mm) guns and crewed by members of the U.S. Navy's Naval Armed Guard.

On 18 December 1916, during an eastbound journey, Finland was halted by a French warship. According to Marjorie Crocker, an American woman headed for refugee work in Paris, the cruiser had fired a shot across the bow of Finland, and then queried the officers of the liner. After allowing Finland to go on her way, the French ship circled around several times, then headed off first in one direction and then another, as if, according to Crocker, it were searching for something.

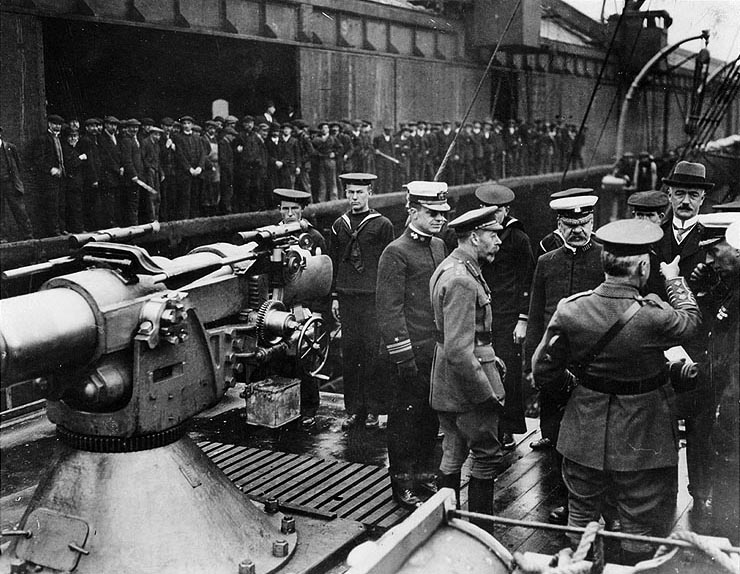
King George V (center foreground, with beard) inspects gun crews aboard Finland in Liverpool on 15 May 1917.

Finland was still in New York–Liverpool service when the United States declared war on the German Empire in April 1917. The United States Army, needing transports to get its men and materiel to France, had a select committee of shipping executives pore over registries of American shipping. On 28 May, the committee selected Finland and thirteen other American-flagged ships that were sufficiently fast, could carry enough coal in their bunkers for transatlantic crossings, and, most importantly, were in port or not far at sea. After Finland discharged her last load of passengers, she was officially handed over to the Army at noon on 2 June, the last of the fourteen ships acquired.

=== U.S. Army service ===
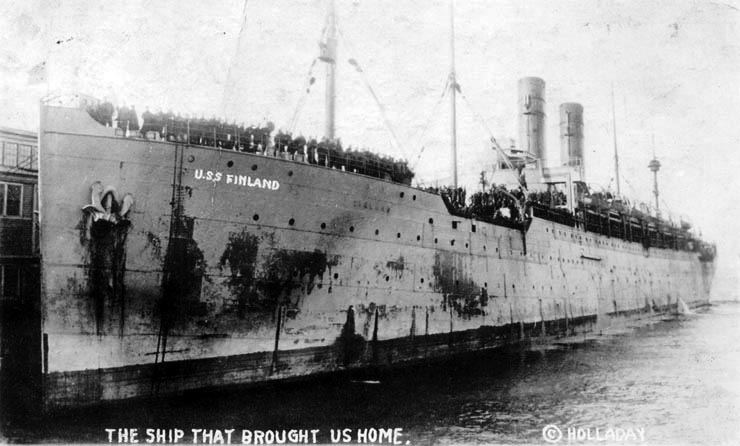
USS Finland (ID-4543) arrives at Newport News, Virginia, with returning U.S. troops in 1919.

Before any troop transportation could be undertaken, all of the ships had to be hastily refitted—in two weeks in the case of Finland. Of the fourteen ships, ten, including Finland, were designated to carry human passengers; the other four were designated as animal ships. The ten ships designated to carry troops had to have all of their second- and third-class accommodations ripped out and replaced with berths for troops. Cooking and toilet facilities had to be greatly expanded to handle the large numbers of men aboard. Finland, uniquely among the fourteen ships, already carried guns and did not need to be refitted for them. All the ships were crewed by merchant officers and sailors but carried two U.S. Navy officers, Navy gun crews, quartermasters, signalmen, and wireless operators. The senior Navy officer on board would take control if a ship came under attack.

The American convoy carrying the AEF was broken into four groups; Finland was in the third group with San Jacinto and Henry R. Mallory, and escorts consisting of cruiser Charleston, armed collier Cyclops, and destroyers Allen, Preston, and McCall. The headquarters detachment and six companies (of a total of 12) of the 18th Infantry Regiment embarked on Finland at New York. The ship, under the command of U.S. Navy Commander S. V. Graham, departed with her group on 14 June for Brest, France, steaming at a comfortable 13-knot (24 km/h) pace. A thwarted submarine attack on the first convoy group, and reports of heavy submarine activity off of Brest resulted in a change in the convoy's destination to Saint-Nazaire.

After returning to the United States, Finland's next convoy crossing began on 6 August in the company of Henderson, Antilles, and San Jacinto, all escorted by cruiser Montana. Finland, carrying some of the troops that had tried to depart on 30 July on Saratoga before she sank near Staten Island, had an uneventful roundtrip. Finland next sailed on 24 September as part of the 8th convoy with Henderson, Antilles, and Lenape, escorted by cruiser San Diego. According to Crowell and Wilson, the 8th group was "destined to misfortune". Three days out from New York, Lenape developed engine trouble and was compelled to return to port, but the rest of the convoy proceeded on and arrived in France on 7 October. Henderson was the only ship to return to the United States without incident. On 17 October, Antilles was torpedoed by U-105, sinking in 6 1/2 minutes with the loss of 67 out of the 234 men on board.

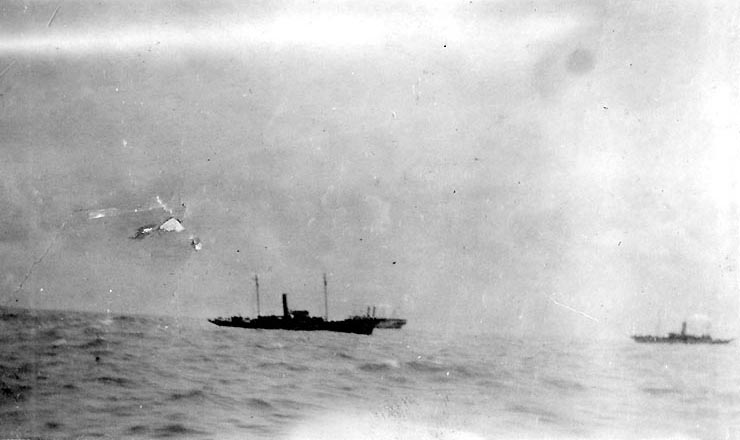
USS Alcedo (left) and USS Wakiva II (far right) pick up survivors from USAT Finland (center background) after she was struck by a torpedo from U-93

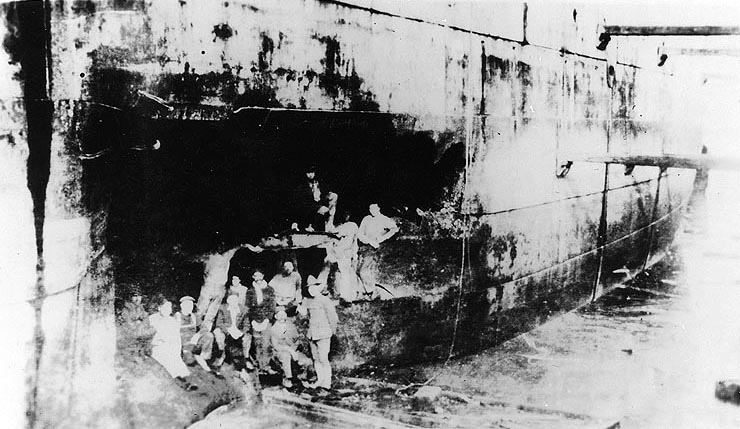
Workers pose by the torpedo damage to Finland in drydock at Brest, France.

Finland began her return journey to the United States on 28 October in an 11-knot (20 km/h) convoy with cargo ships Buford and City of Savannah and escorted by armed yachts Alcedo, Corsair, and Wakiva II, and destroyers Smith, Lamson, Preston, and Flusser. Finland, returning most of the survivors of Antilles back to the U.S., was struck on her starboard side by a torpedo from U-93 at 09:27, 150 nautical miles (280 km) from the French coast. Many of the civilian crew and the survivors of Antilles, experiencing a torpedo attack for the second time in 11 days, panicked. Lifeboats were immediately launched without word from Commander Graham, and the engine room and fire room men all left their stations, contrary to orders. The naval officers, armed with a revolver and a wooden mallet, were able to get the men back to their stations. The damage was limited to one cargo hold and had not affected the boilers or the engines. Although Finland took a starboard list, it did not increase and Graham was able to steer a course back to Brest, anchoring there the next morning. Men aboard the prematurely launched lifeboats were rounded up by Wakiva II and Alcedo and returned to Brest. Nine men, including three of the Naval Armed Guard detachment, two soldiers and four crew perished in the attack.

In the aftermath of the torpedoing incident, Commander Graham was awarded the Navy Distinguished Service Medal for his "exceptionally meritorious service" in getting Finland safely back to port. Lieutenant (junior grade) Huntington English, from Wakiva II, received the Navy Cross, in part because he rescued a soldier who had jumped from the torpedoed transport. Chief Boatswain's Mate John P. Doyle, on Alcedo, was issued a letter of commendation for commanding a whaleboat that pulled a number of men from Finland from the water.

The deportment of the crew aboard Finland, as well as that of Antilles, while under attack demonstrated the problems with civilian-crewed vessels. The Navy, led by the recommendations of Rear Admiral Albert Gleaves, insisted that all troop transports be crewed entirely by Navy personnel. This was accomplished soon after so as to avoid the need for what Gleaves called "ignorant and unreliable men" who were "the sweepings of the docks".

Finland was sufficiently repaired over the next two months and sailed for return to the United States on 5 January 1918. Ready again for convoy duty the next month, she sailed from New York on 10 February with Antigone, Martha Washington, President Lincoln, and Von Steuben under escort of the cruiser Pueblo. After safely reaching Saint-Nazaire, Finland discharged her passengers and cargo that included 13,910 pounds (6,310 kg) of frozen beef for the AEF. On 27 February, one day after departing, Finland's steering gear jammed, forcing her into the path of Henderson. That ship was able to maneuver such that Finland only dealt her a glancing blow. Finland suffered only superficial damage; Henderson was holed below the waterline, but her crew took advantage of unusually calm February seas to repair the damage, and were soon able to proceed to New York. Finland and President Lincoln arrived back at New York on 16 March.

Finland made one more crossing under Army charter. Leaving New York on 23 March, she convoyed with Powhatan, El Occidente, Martha Washington, and cruiser Pueblo, arriving in France on 4 April. Finland returned to New York on 24 April, and was delivered to the U.S. Navy the same day.

=== U.S. Navy service ===
Finland was commissioned on 26 April. The transport's move from Army to Navy control little changed her routine. Four days after her Navy commissioning, Finland departed New York with Matsonia, Manchuria, and Kroonland. Rendezvousing with the convoy were two transports sailing from Newport News, Virginia, Martha Washington and Powhatan. South Dakota provided the convoy with protection until its arrival in France on 12 May. Finland and Manchuria both returned to New York on 30 May.

Finland next left New York on 15 June with DeKalb, Kroonland, George Washington, Covington, Rijndam, Italian steamer Dante Alighieri, and British steamer Vauban and met up with the Newport News portion of the convoy—which included Lenape, Wilhelmina, Princess Matoika, Pastores, and British troopship Czar—the next morning and set out for France. The convoy was escorted by cruisers North Carolina and Frederick, and destroyers Stevens and Fairfax; battleship Texas and several other destroyers joined in escort duties for the group for a time. The convoy had a false alarm when a floating barrel was mistaken for submarine, but otherwise uneventfully arrived at Brest on the afternoon of 27 June. Finland and Kroonland arrived back at New York on 13 July. Covington was not so fortunate. On her return journey, she was torpedoed by U-86 on 1 July, and sank the next afternoon.

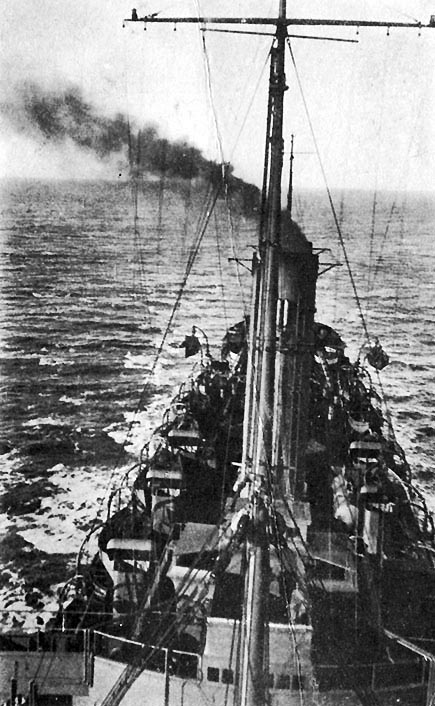
Looking aft from USS Finland's crow's nest on her foremast while the ship was underway at sea, c. 1918–19.

On 26 July, Finland, loaded with 3,879 officers and men, departed on her next trip to France. In the company of Kroonland and Italian steamer Taormina, she met up with Pocahontas, Susquehanna, and the Italian steamers Duca d'Aosta and Caserta from Newport News. Cruisers Pueblo, Huntington, and destroyers Rathburne and Colhoun ushered the transports to France, where they arrived on 7 August. Finland arrived back in the United States on 25 August.

After embarking 3,678 troops, Finland departed again on 15 September sailing with Henderson, Martha Washington, Pocahontas, Calamares, Powhatan, and steamer Ulua. Finland's New York group met up with a Virginia group of Navy transports Aeolus and Koningen der Nederlanden, and steamers Patria and Kursk. Escorts New Hampshire, Pueblo, St. Louis, Stribling, Stringham, and Hopkins helped to ensure the safe arrival of all ships in France on 28 September. Martha Washington and Pocahontas accompanied Finland on her return journey and arrived at New York on 12 October.

Finland began one last transatlantic crossing before the Armistice. She left New York with hospital ship Mercy and steamers Lutetia, Czaritza and Armaugh with battleship Georgia on 4 November and arrived in France on 15 November, four days after the end of hostilities. In all, Finland transported 12,654 troops to France on her five Navy crossings.

As the flow of troops was reversed to bring American troops home, Finland made 8 round trips from Europe to the United States, returning 32,197 personnel to the United States. On 4 September 1919 she was transferred to the 3d Naval District and on 15 November decommissioned and delivered to the War Department, and, eventually, to the Red Star Line.

== Postwar career ==
After a refurbishment that outfitted her for 242 first-class, 310 second-class, and 876 third-class passengers, Finland resumed her civilian career in April 1920. The liner, sailing opposite her sister ship Kroonland, returned to her original route when she departed Antwerp on 28 April for Southampton and New York. The two ships remained on that route until chartered to the American Line in mid-1923. After both ships were converted to cabin- and third-class passengers only, they sailed on the New York–Plymouth–Cherbourg–Hamburg route from June to September. On 29 September, Finland resumed New York–San Francisco service for the Panama Pacific Line; Kroonland once again joined her sister ship the following month. When California and Virginia joined the Panama Pacific fleet in 1928, Finland and Kroonland were no longer needed and both were scrapped; Finland by Hughes Bolckow Shipbreaking Ltd at Blyth, Northumberland. She arrived for breaking on 28 April 1928. Kroonland was scrapped at Genoa.

In 1925, Harold S. Vanderbilt devised the game of contract bridge while on board Finland.
