= USS Tenadores =

Coordinates: 46°44′N 2°24′W

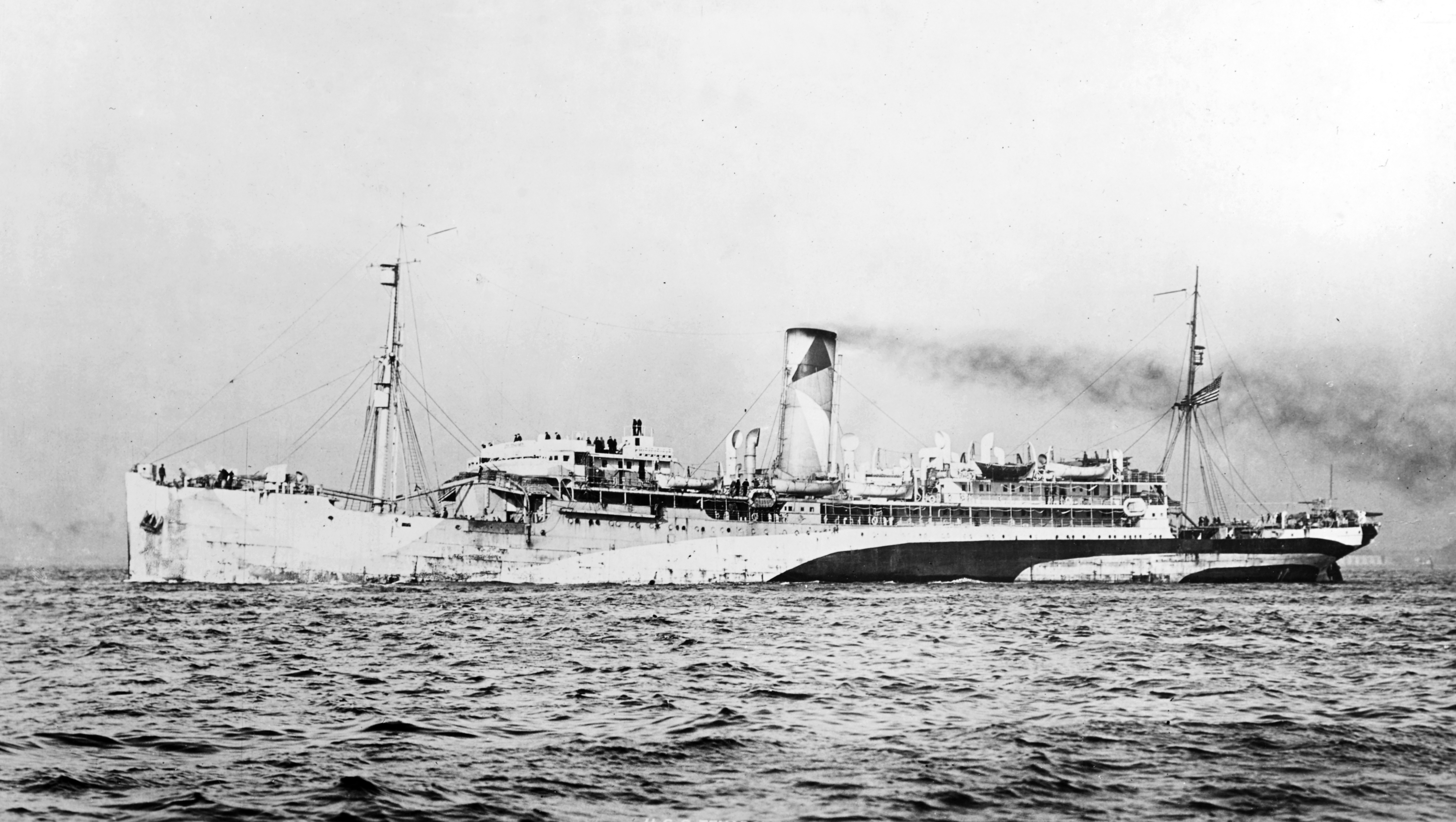
- Tenadores

History
- Name: SS Tenadores
- Owner: United Fruit Company
- Builder: Workman, Clark and Co.; Belfast, Northern Ireland
- Launched: 28 March 1913
- Fate: turned over to the U.S. Navy, 12 April 1918

History

United States
- Name: USS Tenadores
- Acquired: 12 April 1918
- Commissioned: 17 April 1918
- Stricken: 18 February 1919
- Fate: Grounded on Île d'Yeu, 28 December 1918

General characteristics as USS Tenadores
- Type: Transport
- Displacement: 7,782 long tons (7,907 t)
- Length: 485 ft (148 m)
- Beam: 55 ft 3 in (16.84 m)
- Draft: 27 ft 4 in (8.33 m)
- Propulsion: Steam engine(s)
- Speed: 17 kn (20 mph; 31 km/h)
- Armament: 4 × 5 in (130 mm) guns, 2 × 1-pounder guns, 2 × machine guns

USS Tenadores was a transport ship for the United States Navy during World War I. Before the war she was known as SS Tenadores in the service of the United Fruit Company. Before her Navy service, she served as a United States Army transport under the name USAT Tenadores.

== World War I ==
Tenadores was built in 1913 by Workman, Clark and Co. of Belfast, Northern Ireland for the United Fruit Company. After being turned over to the U.S. Army on 24 May 1917, the steamer served as Army transport USAT Tenadores. She was hurriedly outfitted for trooping duties, and at daybreak on 14 June, Tenadores — with fellow Army transport ships Saratoga, Havana, and Pastores, accompanied by cruisers Seattle, DeKalb, destroyers Wilkes, Terry, Roe, and converted yacht Corsair — set out from Ambrose Light for Brest, France, in the first group of the first American troop convoy to France during World War I. Corsair was unable to maintain the 15 kn (17 mph; 28 km/h) pace and fell back, being replaced by destroyer Fanning from the second group. At 22:15 on 22 June, some 850 nmi (980 mi; 1,570 km) from its intended destination of Brest, Saratoga's group of the convoy was attacked by submarines. Two torpedoes passed near Havana and two torpedoes straddled DeKalb. No submarines were definitively sighted, and the convoy — scattered by the alarm — reformed the next morning. The group, alerted by reports of submarine activity near Brest diverted to Saint-Nazaire and arrived on 25 June.

Tenadores was taken over by the U.S. Navy on 12 April 1918 and commissioned on 17 April 1918. Tenadores served as a troop transport during the remainder of World War I. Shortly after midnight on 28 December, the ship grounded in a heavy fog off the north coast of the Île d'Yeu.

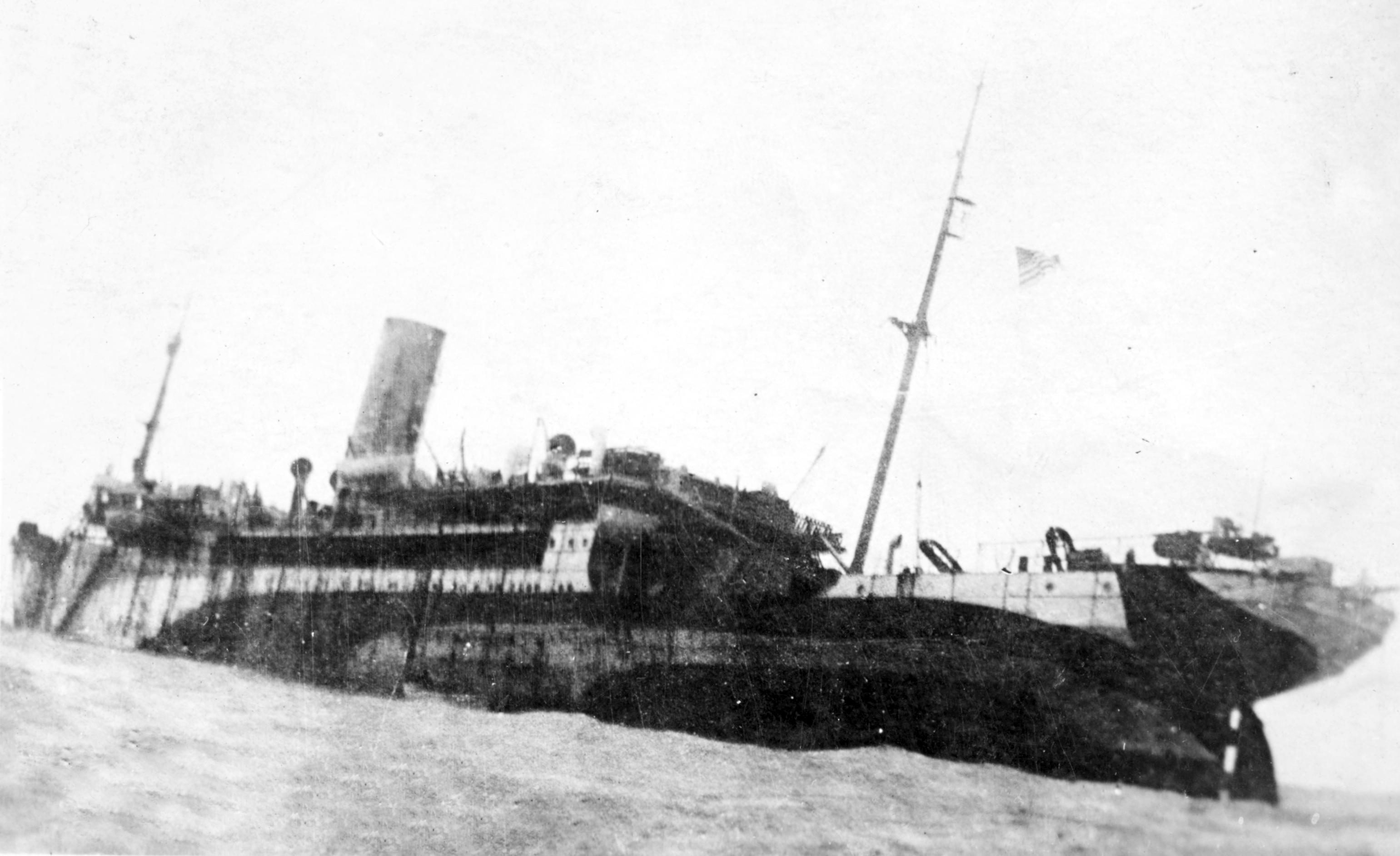
Tenadores wrecked on Île d'Yeu, 28 December 1918

During unsuccessful efforts to refloat the ship, some 80 long tons (81 t) of supplies were removed from the stricken vessel and taken to Saint-Nazaire. On 30 December, minesweeper B. H. B. Hubbard rescued the last members of the transport's crew. On 2 January 1919, Hubbard returned to Tenadores for one last attempt to salvage the ship but was thwarted by high seas and the hopeless state of the transport, which was lying on her starboard side and breaking up. The name Tenadores was struck from the Naval Vessel Register on 18 February.
