= USS SC-209 =

WWI US submarine chaser

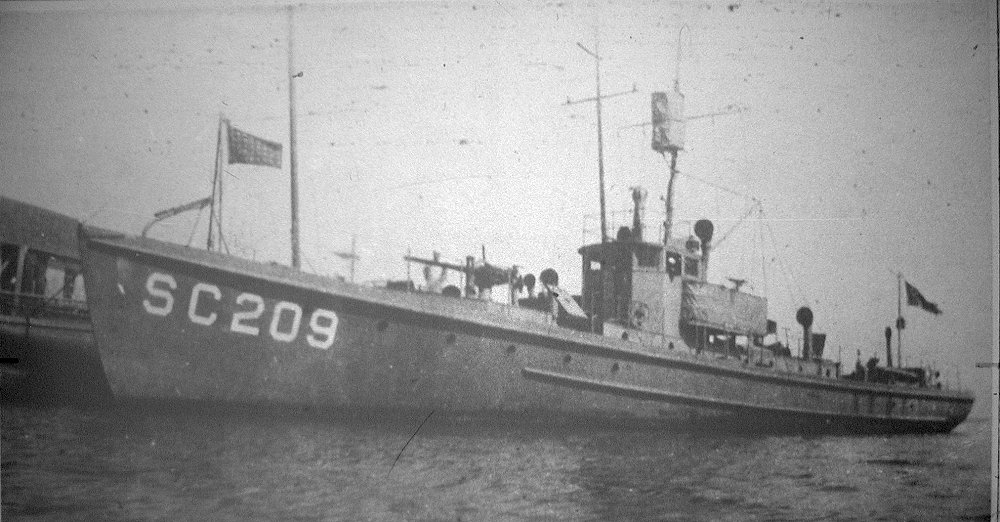

History

United States Navy
- Name: Submarine Chaser No. 209 (1917–1918); SC-209 (retrospectively, 1920)
- Builder: Mathis Yacht Building Company, Camden, New Jersey
- Laid down: 1917
- Commissioned: March 1918
- Identification: NONM
- Fate: Sunk 27 August 1918
- Stricken: Late 1919
- Reclassified: SC-209 on 17 July 1920 (retrospectively)

General characteristics
- Class & type: SC-1-class submarine chaser
- Displacement: 77 tons normal; 85 tons full load
- Length: 110 ft (34 m) overall; 105 ft (32 m) between perpendiculars
- Beam: 14 ft 9 in (4.50 m)
- Draft: 5 ft 7 in (1.70 m) normal; 6 ft 6 in (1.98 m) full load
- Propulsion: Three 220 bhp (160 kW) Standard Motor Construction Company six-cylinder gasoline engines, three shafts, 2,400 US gal (9,100 L) of gasoline; one Standard Motor Construction Company two-cylinder gasoline-powered auxiliary engine
- Speed: 18 knots (33 km/h; 21 mph)
- Range: 1,000 nmi (1,900 km; 1,200 mi) at 10 knots (19 km/h; 12 mph)
- Complement: 27 (2 officers, 25 enlisted men)
- Sensors & processing systems: One Submarine Signal Company S.C. C Tube, M.B. Tube, or K Tube hydrophone
- Armament: 1 × 3-inch (76.2 mm)/23-caliber gun mount; 2 × Colt .30-caliber (7.62 mm) machine guns; 1 × Y-gun depth charge projector

USS SC-209, prior to July 1920, known as USS Submarine Chaser No. 209 or USS S.C. 209, was an SC-1-class submarine chaser in commission in the United States Navy during 1918. She was the victim of the deadliest friendly fire incident involving the U.S. Navy during World War I.

== Construction and commissioning ==
SC-209 was a wooden-hulled 110-foot (34 m) submarine chaser laid down by the Mathis Yacht Building Company at Camden, New Jersey, in 1917. She was commissioned in March 1918 as USS Submarine Chaser No. 209, abbreviated at the time as USS S.C. 209.

== Service history ==
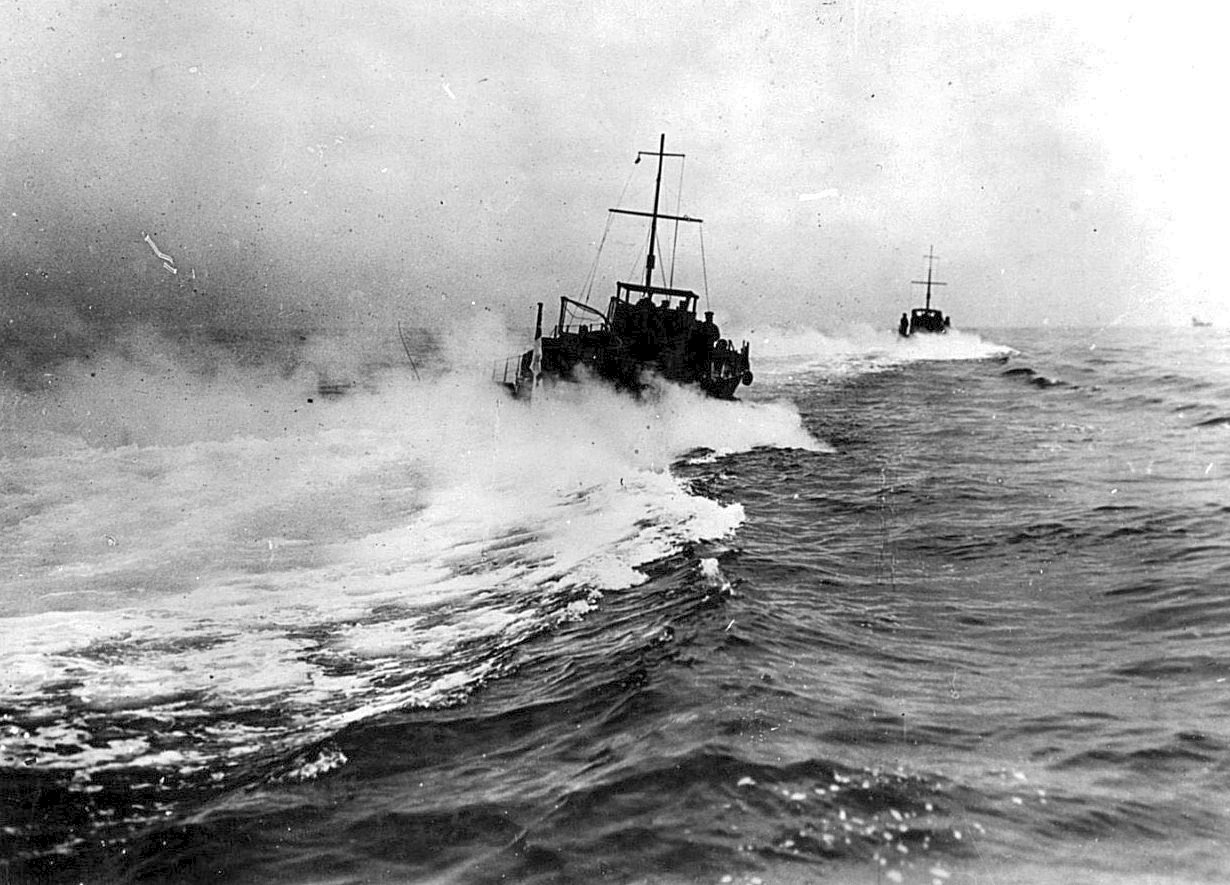
U.S. Navy submarine chasers at sea in August 1918 with USS S.C. 209 in the lead.

On 22 August 1918, the Patterson Group was created to perform patrol and antisubmarine warfare duties also the United States East Coast during World War I. It consisted of the destroyer USS Patterson, which served as its flagship, and 12 submarine chasers, including S.C. 209.

During the predawn hours of 27 August 1918, S.C. 209 was part of a scouting line of 11 submarine chasers patrolling with Patterson in the Atlantic Ocean south of Long Island, New York, in search of Imperial German Navy submarines. The United States Army-chartered armed cargo ship SS Felix Taussig, with guns manned by U.S. Navy gunners, was passing through the area, nearing the end of a voyage from Bordeaux, France, to New York City. At 02:40, Felix Taussig sighted S.C. 209 on her port beam, headed in the same direction. S.C. 209 drew ahead of Felix Taussig and then crossed her bow. S.C. 209 was operating without running lights, and in the darkness, Felix Taussig's crew mistook her for a German submarine. Felix Taussig's 3-inch (76.2 mm) forward gun fired four rounds, and her 4-inch (102 mm) after gun fired one. After the third shot, S.C. 209 turned on her running lights to identify herself as friendly, but the last shots were fired before the gunners aboard Felix Taussig received the order to cease firing. The second and fourth 3-inch rounds struck S.C. 209, and she caught fire and sank in only three minutes at 40°08′N 073°12′W with the loss of two officers and 16 men. The submarine chaser USS S.C. 188 rescued S.C. 209's five survivors, four of whom were wounded. Patterson and two other submarine chasers searched the area but found no more survivors. Felix Taussig stood by to render assistance until Patterson directed her to continue her voyage to New York City. Patterson carried the wounded survivors into New York Harbor for transfer to the U.S. Navy hospital ship USS Comfort. The sinking of SC-209 was the U.S. Navy's largest loss of life in a single friendly fire incident during World War I.

S.C. 209 was stricken from the Naval Vessel Register in late 1919.

When the U.S. Navy adopted its modern hull number system on 17 July 1920, Submarine Chaser No. 209 retrospectively was classified as SC-209, and her name was shortened to USS SC-209

== Honors and awards ==
- World War I Victory Medal with Submarine Chaser Clasp for the period 16–23 August 1918
