= SS Yucatan =

SS Yucatan may refer to one of the following ships of the Ward Line:

- SS Yucatan (1890), in service 1890–1898; chartered to U.S. Army as transport (1898–1906); during Spanish–American War; carried Theodore Roosevelt’s "Rough Riders" to Cuba; sold to Northwestern Steamship Co., 1906, for operation between Seattle and Alaska; scrapped 1929
- SS Yucatan (1903), in service under this named from 1921 to 1925; the former North German Lloyd liner Prinz Waldemar (1903–1917); renamed Wacouta after seizure by the USSB in 1917; Wacouta for Ward Line (1919–1921); scrapped 1925
- SS Yucatan (1906), in service under this name from 1936 to 1941; Ward liner Havana (1906–1917, 1927–1936); hospital ship Comfort (AH-3) for U.S. Navy (1917–1925); Agwileon as freighter for Atlantic, Gulf, & West Indies Steamship Lines (AGWI Lines) (1941–1942) and as U.S. Army transport (1942–1943); hospital ship Shamrock for U.S. Army (1943–1946); scrapped 1948

or to:

- SS Yucatan (1882), built by Harland and Wolff for West India Shipping Co and completed in 1882
