= USS Felix Taussig =

Cargo ship of the United States Navy

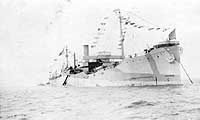
- USS Felix Taussig (Id. No. 2282) at anchor in 1918 or 1919, dressed overall and painted in pattern camouflage.

History

United States
- Name: Felix Taussig
- Owner: Crowell & Thurlow Steamship Company
- Builder: Newport News Shipbuilding and Dry Dock Company, Newport News, Virginia
- Launched: 1917
- Completed: 1917
- Identification: Official number 214726
- Fate: Requisitioned by Emergency Fleet Corporation; Chartered by United States Army; Transferred to United States Navy 29 August 1918; Returned by U.S. Navy 26 April 1919; Sold 1948

United States
- Name: Felix Taussig
- Namesake: Previous name retained
- Acquired: 29 August 1918
- Commissioned: 31 August 1918
- Decommissioned: 26 April 1919
- Identification: Hull number: ID-2282
- Fate: Transferred to United States Shipping Board 26 April 1919; Returned to owners 26 April 1919

Italy
- Name: Ata
- Acquired: 1948
- Fate: Scrapped 1953

General characteristics (as U.S. Navy cargo ship)
- Type: Cargo ship
- Tonnage: 5,965 gross register tons; 3,736 net register tons
- Displacement: 12,925 long tons (13,132 t) (normal)
- Length: 410 ft 6 in (125.12 m)
- Beam: 55 ft 1 in (16.79 m)
- Draft: 27 ft 6 in (8.38 m)
- Propulsion: One 2,200 ihp (1,600 kW) vertical triple expansion steam engine, three single-ended boilers, one shaft
- Speed: 11 knots (20 km/h; 13 mph)
- Capacity: 406,600 sq ft (37,770 m^{2}) (cargo)
- Complement: 62
- Armament: 1 × 4-inch (102 mm)/50 gun (aft); 1 × 3-inch (76.2 mm)/50 gun (forward)

USS Felix Taussig (ID-2282) was a cargo ship in commission in the United States Navy from 1918 to 1919. She saw service during World War I. Prior to her U.S. Navy service, she operated as the American commercial cargo ship SS Felix Taussig under charter to the United States Army. During this service she mistakenly sank the U.S. Navy submarine chaser USS SC-209 in the deadliest friendly fire incident involving the U.S. Navy of World War I. Felix Taussig returned to commercial service after World War I, first as SS Felix Taussig from 1919 to 1948, then from 1948 until 1953 under the Italian flag as SS Ata.

== Construction and early service ==
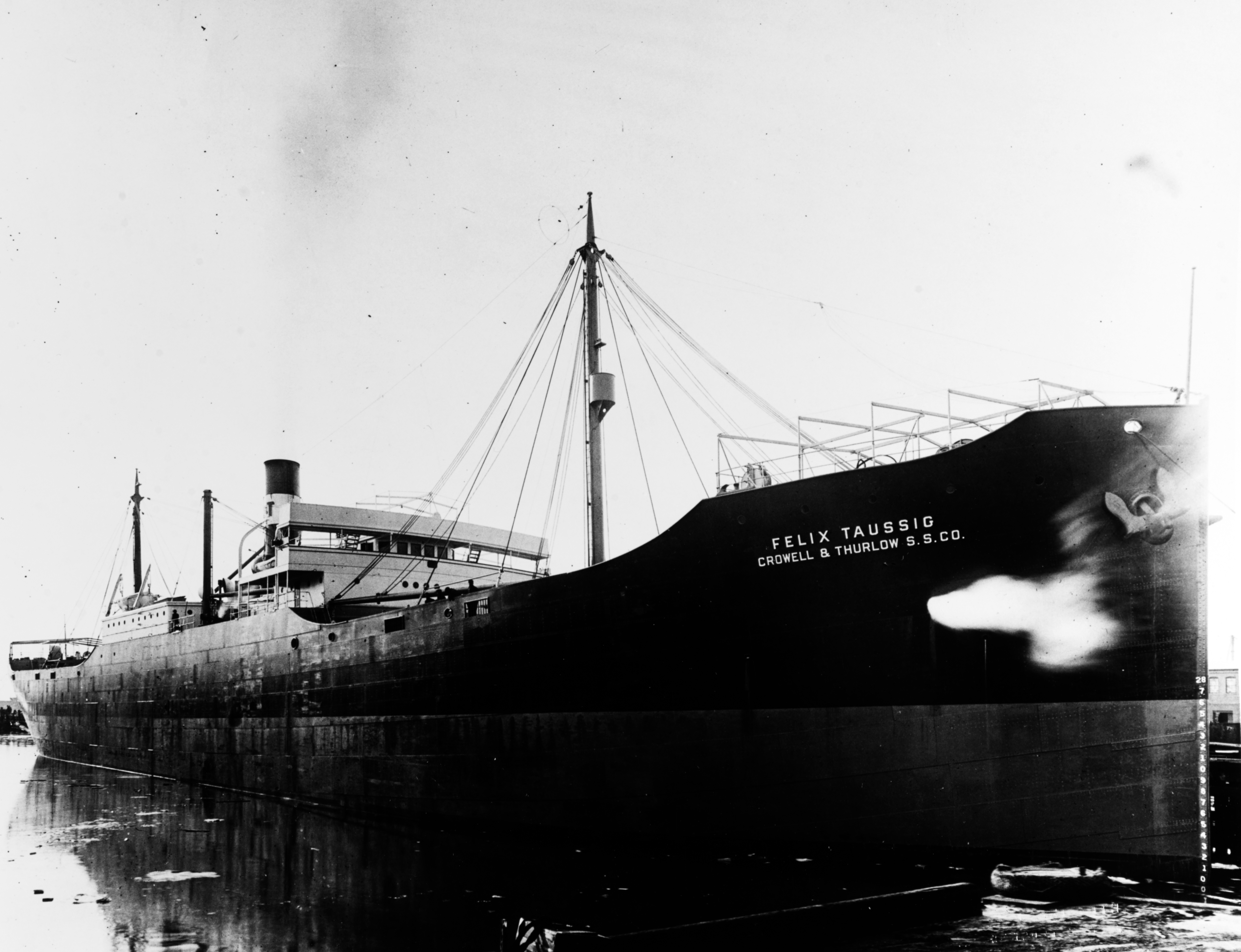
Felix Taussig, ca. 1917, probably upon completion.

SS Felix Taussig was constructed in 1917 by the Newport News Shipbuilding and Dry Dock Company at Newport News, Virginia, as a commercial cargo ship for the Crowell & Thurlow Steamship Company of Philadelphia, Pennsylvania. The Emergency Fleet Corporation requisitioned her for World War I service, and she was chartered by the United States Army. She was armed for war service and began hauling cargo from the United States to Europe.

On 12 May 1918, an Imperial German Navy submarine fired torpedoes at Felix Taussig. She took evasive action and avoided the torpedoes. She then sighted the submarine, and U.S. Navy gunners on board Felix Taussig fired four rounds at it, claiming a hit with their last shot. For the action, the commander of her gun crews, Chief Gunner's Mate Henry R. Chambers, received the Navy Cross.

During the predawn hours of 27 August 1918, Felix Taussig was in the Atlantic Ocean south of Long Island, New York, nearing the end of a voyage from Bordeaux, France, to New York City, while a U.S. Navy force consisting of the destroyer USS Patterson and 11 submarine chasers were patrolling the area in search of German submarines, with the submarine chasers proceeding in a scouting line. At 02:40, Felix Taussig sighted the submarine chaser USS SC-209 on her port beam, headed in the same direction. SC-209 drew ahead of Felix Taussig and then crossed her bow. SC-209 was operating without running lights, and in the darkness Felix Taussig's crew mistook her for a German submarine. Her 3-inch (76.2 mm) forward gun fired four rounds, and her 4-inch (102 mm) after gun fired one. After the third shot, SC-209 turned on her running lights to identify herself as friendly, but the last shots were fired before the gunners aboard Felix Taussig received the order to cease firing. The second and fourth 3-inch rounds struck SC-209, and SC-209 caught fire and sank in only three minutes at 40°08′N 073°12′W with the loss of two officers and 16 enlisted men. The submarine chaser USS SC-188 rescued SC-209's five survivors, four of whom were wounded. Patterson and two other submarine chasers searched the area but found no more survivors. Felix Taussig stood by to render assistance until Patterson directed her to continue her voyage to New York City. Patterson carried the wounded survivors into New York Harbor for transfer to the U.S. Navy hospital ship USS Comfort. The sinking of SC-209 was the U.S. Navy's largest loss of life in a single friendly fire incident during World War I.

== United States Navy service ==
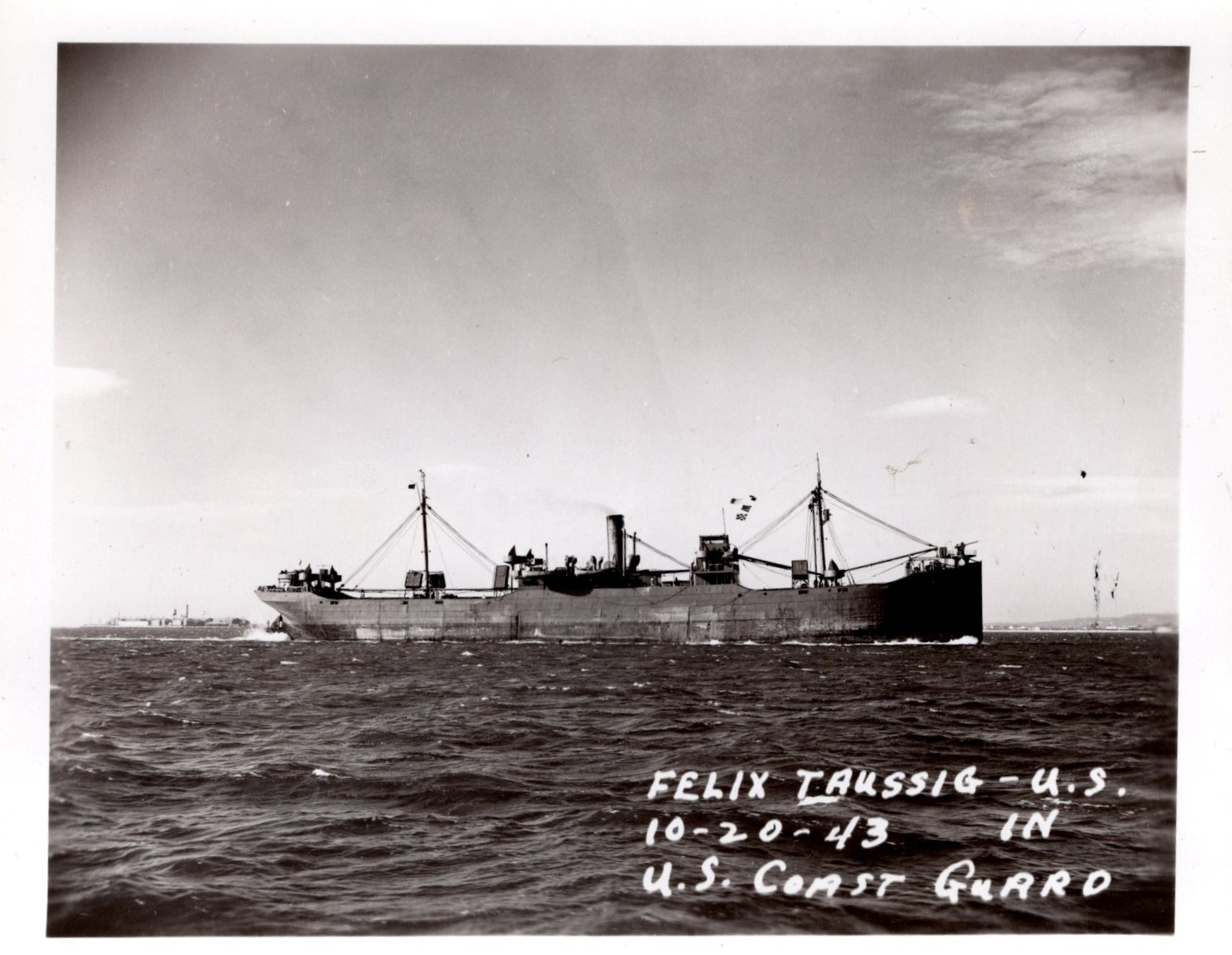
Felix Taussig on 20 October 1943.

Ata

The U.S. Navy acquired Felix Taussig on 29 August 1918, assigned her the identification number 2282, and commissioned her on 31 August 1918 as USS Felix Taussig.

Assigned to the Naval Overseas Transportation Service and using Philadelphia as her departure port, Felix Taussig made three voyages to France — two to Brest and one to Bordeaux and St. Nazaire — between 17 September 1918 and 1 April 1919. She carried provisions and general cargo for the U.S. Army to France and returned to Philadelphia in ballast, although she did carry some passengers on her last voyage. At Philadelphia on 26 April 1919, she was decommissioned, transferred to the United States Shipping Board, and returned to the Crowell & Thurlow Steamship Company.

== Later career ==
The ship returned to commercial service as SS Felix Taussig. During World War II, she was among 37 merchant ships escorted by eight warships in Convoy TAG 18, a TAG convoy operating in the Caribbean on the route Trinidad-Aruba-Guantanamo Bay. During its 2-8 November 1942 transit, the convoy came under attack by the German submarines U-129 and U-160, which sank six ships. Felix Taussig′s embarked United States Navy Armed Guard received the American Campaign Medal with a battle star for service during the convoy battle.

Felix Taussig remained in service under the American flag until 1948, when she was sold to Italian interests. Renamed Ata, she then operated under the Italian flag until she was scrapped in 1953.

== Honors and awards ==
- World War I Victory Medal with Armed Guard Clasp for the period 13 October 1917–29 August 1918
- American Campaign Medal with one battle star for embarked United States Navy Armed Guard's service in Convoy TAG 18 for the period 1–6 November 1942
- Merchant Marine World War II Victory Medal
