= USS Patterson (DD-36) =

Paulding-class destroyer

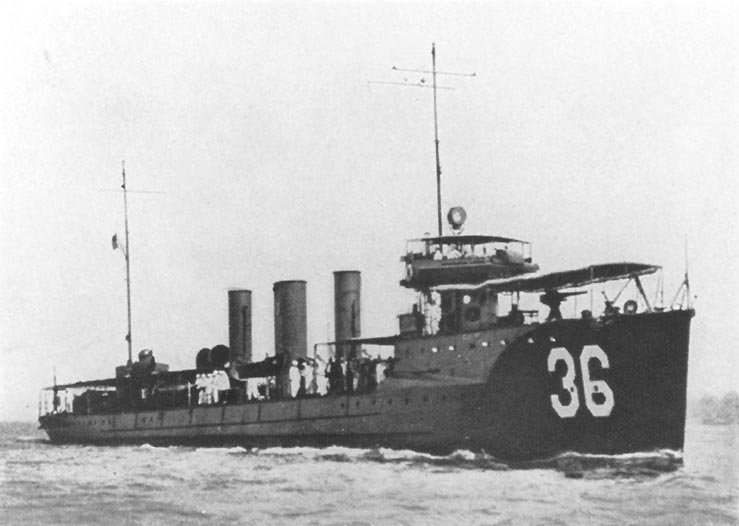
- USS Patterson (DD-36) underway, circa 1916, halftone reproduction.

History

United States
- Name: Patterson
- Namesake: Captain Daniel Patterson
- Builder: William Cramp & Sons, Philadelphia
- Cost: $633,161.80
- Yard number: 361
- Laid down: 29 March 1910
- Launched: 29 April 1911
- Sponsored by: Miss Georgeanne Pollock Patterson
- Commissioned: 11 October 1911
- Decommissioned: 1 January 1919
- Stricken: 28 June 1934
- Identification: Hull symbol:DD-36; Code letters:NOK
- Fate: Transferred to the United States Coast Guard; Sold for scrap 2 May 1934
- Notes: Patterson lost her name to new construction on July 1, 1933

United States
- Name: Patterson
- Acquired: 28 April 1924
- Commissioned: 24 November 1924
- Decommissioned: 16 March 1930
- Identification: Hull symbol:CG-16
- Fate: returned to the US Navy, 8 October 1930

General characteristics
- Class & type: Paulding-class destroyer
- Displacement: 742 long tons (754 t) normal; 887 long tons (901 t) full load
- Length: 293 ft 10 in (89.56 m)
- Beam: 27 ft (8.2 m)
- Draft: 8 ft 4 in (2.54 m) (mean)
- Installed power: 12,000 ihp (8,900 kW)
- Propulsion: 4 × boilers; 3 × Parsons Direct Drive Turbines; 3 × shafts
- Speed: 29.5 kn (33.9 mph; 54.6 km/h); 29.69 kn (34.17 mph; 54.99 km/h) (Speed on Trial)
- Complement: 4 officers 87 enlisted
- Armament: 5 × 3 in (76 mm)/50 caliber guns; 6 × 18 inch (450 mm) torpedo tubes (3 × 2)

The first USS Patterson (DD-36) was a modified Paulding-class destroyer in the United States Navy during World War I and later in the United States Coast Guard, designated as CG-16. She was named for Daniel Patterson.

== Construction and commissioning ==
Patterson was laid down on 29 March 1910 by William Cramp & Sons at Philadelphia, Pennsylvania. She was launched on 29 April 1911, sponsored by Miss Georgeanne Pollock Patterson, and commissioned on 11 October 1911.

== Pre-World War I ==
Patterson departed Philadelphia on 23 October 1911, calling at Newport, Rhode Island, and New York City, before arriving at Boston on 2 November, her homeport for operations off the New England Coast, the Virginia Capes, and south to Charleston, South Carolina; Pensacola, Florida; and Guantánamo Bay, Cuba. She arrived off Vera Cruz from Pensacola on 20 May 1914 and headed home four days later.

== World War I ==
As America entered World War I, Patterson patrolled along the New England Coast in the approaches to Newport and Boston to safeguard inbound trans-Atlantic convoys. One patrol mission took her as far north as St. John's, Newfoundland.

The first United States help to the hard-pressed allies was the assignment of US destroyers to the British Fleet to help combat enemy submarines that threatened to cut the sea lifelines to the British Isles. Patterson was the flagship of the second division of destroyers to cross the Atlantic on this mission. But the destroyers could not make it across the North Atlantic without refueling. Newly commissioned fleet oiler Maumee, whose executive officer and chief engineer was Lieutenant Chester W. Nimitz, stationed herself in mid-Atlantic, between Boston and Queenstown, Ireland.

Patterson led Division 5 out of Boston Harbor on 21 May 1917 and made rendezvous with Maumee the morning of 28 May. She was the first destroyer to maneuver alongside Maumee to receive fuel oil enabling her to complete the Atlantic crossing. The division arrived Queenstown, Ireland, on 1 June 1917. There Patterson and her sister destroyers received British signal books and depth charges.

Patterson began patrol and escort in the approaches to Queenstown on 5 June. On 12 June, she dropped depth charges to help drive away a German U-boat attacking SS Indian. A collision with His Majesty's tug Dreadful at the entrance to Berehaven Harbour, Ireland, the night of 1 January 1918, damaged Patterson's bow but she resumed regular escort and patrol on 5 February. Two days later she rescued 12 survivors of steamship Mexico City, torpedoed by a German submarine. Patterson, patrolling in the Irish Sea on 17 May, dropped depth charges that drove away German U-101. She continued patrol out of Queenstown until 4 June, then departed for the United States.

On 16 June, one day out of Bermuda, Patterson rescued survivors of the Norwegian bark Kringsjaa, sunk by the German submarine U-151. She landed the survivors at the Cape May Naval Station and continued on to the Philadelphia Navy Yard at Philadelphia, arriving on 18 June for overhaul. She departed Norfolk, Virginia, on 17 August 1918 for Tompkinsville, New York. There she joined the escort of the battleship USS Pennsylvania bound for Norfolk. On 22 August 1918, she got underway from Norfolk as flagship of the “Patterson Group”, a special hunting squadron that included 11 submarine chasers. The Patterson Group hunted German U-boats north from the Virginia Capes to New York.

During the predawn hours of 27 August 1918, the American armed cargo ship SS Felix Taussig mistook the Patterson Group submarine chaser USS SC-209 for a German submarine in the Atlantic Ocean south of Long Island, New York, and opened gunfire on SC-209, hitting her with two 3-inch (76.2 mm) shells. SC-209 caught fire and sank in only three minutes at 40°08′N 073°12′W with the loss of two officers and 16 men. The submarine chaser USS SC-188 rescued SC–209′s five survivors, four of whom were wounded. Patterson and two other submarine chasers searched the area but found no more survivors. Felix Taussig stood by to render assistance until Patterson directed her to continue her voyage to New York City. It was the U.S. Navy's largest loss of life in a single friendly fire incident during World War I. Patterson carried the wounded survivors into New York Harbor for transfer to the U.S. Navy hospital ship USS Comfort.

Patterson dropped depth charges to drive away a German U-boat on 3 September 1918, continuing antisubmarine warfare patrols along the United States East Coast until the special hunting group disbanded on 23 November 1918, twelve days after the armistice with Germany brought World War I to an end.

== Inter-war period ==
Patterson entered the Philadelphia Navy Yard on 1 January 1919, remaining there until she was transferred to the United States Coast Guard on 28 April 1924. She was stationed at Stapleton, New York, and served as USCGC Patterson on the Rum Patrol during Prohibition in the United States.

Returned to the Navy on 18 October 1930, Patterson remained inactive until her name was cancelled on 1 July 1933 to permit its assignment to USS Patterson (DD-392). Her hulk was sold for scrapping on 2 May 1934 in accordance with the London Naval Treaty. She was struck from the Naval Vessel Register on 28 June.
