= USS Comfort (AH-3) =

U.S. Navy hospital ship (1906–1917)

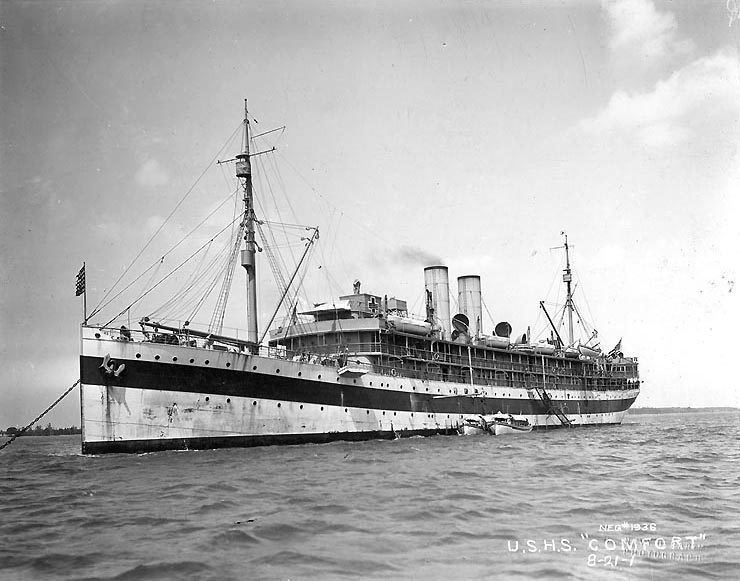
- USS Comfort at anchor, c. 1919

History

Ward Line
- Name: SS Havana
- Namesake: Havana, Cuba
- Owner: Ward Line
- Builder: William Cramp & Sons, Philadelphia
- Yard number: 340
- Launched: October 1906
- In service: 1907
- Out of service: 23 May 1917

United States
- Name: USS Comfort
- Acquired: 17 December 1917
- Commissioned: 18 March 1918
- Decommissioned: 5 August 1921
- Fate: Laid up; Sold to AGWI Line 1925

Ward Line
- Name: SS Havana
- Owner: Ward Line
- Acquired: 1927
- In service: 1928
- Renamed: SS Yucatan, 1935
- Renamed: SS Agwileon, 1940
- Out of service: 1941

United States
- Name: USAT Agwileon
- Acquired: April 1942
- In service: April 1942
- Refit: Atlantic Basin Iron Works, November 1942–April 1943
- Refit: Atlantic Basin Iron Works, June–August 1943
- Reclassified: hospital ship USAHS Shamrock, August 1943
- Refit: Charleston Navy Yard, April–September 1945
- Out of service: 4 February 1946, NDRF, Suisun Bay
- Fate: Sold for scrapping, February 1948

General characteristics
- Displacement: 10,102 long tons (10,264 t)
- Length: 429 ft 10 in (131.01 m)
- Beam: 50 ft 2 in (15.29 m)
- Draft: 26 ft (7.9 m)
- Speed: 18 kn (21 mph; 33 km/h)
- Complement: 318

Differences as USAT Agwileon:
- Tonnage: 6,678
- Draft: 23 ft 11 in (7.29 m)
- Propulsion: 2 × reciprocating steam engines
- Speed: 14 kn (16 mph; 26 km/h)
- Range: 4,900 nmi (5,600 mi; 9,100 km)
- Capacity: Cargo: 146,360 cu ft (4,144 m^{3})
- Troops: 1,350

Differences as USAHS Shamrock:
- Range: 5,800 nmi (6,700 mi; 10,700 km)
- Capacity: Patients: 602 patients; Cargo: None
- Armament: None

USS Comfort (AH-3) was a hospital ship for the United States Navy in World War I. She was the sister ship of USS Mercy (AH-4) but the two ships were not of a ship class. Comfort was known as SS Havana in passenger service for the Ward Line, and as USAT Havana in United States Army service before her Navy service. Her name was restored to Havana in 1927, and she was renamed SS Yucatán in 1935, and SS Agwileon in 1941. In World War II, she was known as USAT Agwileon and USAHS Shamrock in service for the United States Army.

Launched in 1906, SS Havana was a passenger steamer for the Ward Line on the New York–Havana route from 1907 to 1917. Before being purchased by the Navy, the ship briefly served as United States Army transport ship USAT Havana and was in the first U.S. convoy of ships to sail for France during World War I. In her Navy career, Comfort made three transatlantic voyages, bringing home over 1,100 men from European ports. Comfort was placed in reserve in September 1919, decommissioned in 1921, and sold in April 1925.

The former hospital ship was repurchased by the Ward Line in 1927, who refitted her and placed her back in service on the Havana route under her original name of Havana. In January 1935, Havana grounded on a reef north of The Bahamas and remained there for three months. After being refloated and repaired, she was placed back in service as SS Yucatán in June. In 1940 the ship was removed from passenger service to be converted into a freighter. After capsizing in port in 1941, the ship was again refloated and renamed SS Agwileon.

Under a bareboat charter by the United States Maritime Commission, Agwileon carried civilian technicians and advisors to Sierra Leone for the U.S. Army. In November 1942, the ship was taken over by the Army as USAT Agwileon and converted to a troopship, making one trip in that capacity. In June 1943, the ship was selected for conversion to an Army hospital ship, and was renamed USAHS Shamrock. Operating locally in the Mediterranean for most of her career, the ship had transported almost 18,000 patients by September 1944. The ship was converted for use in the Pacific Theatre, but not before the war ended. The ship was placed in reserve in February 1946, and was scrapped in February 1948.

== Ward Line, 1907–1917 ==
Havana was launched in 1906 by William Cramp & Sons of Philadelphia for the New York & Cuba Mail Steam Ship Co. — commonly referred to as the Ward Line — as a passenger steamer on the New York to Havana route.

In 1909, on the way to the Quarantine Station in New York, Havana rammed the anchored Munson Line freighter Cubana which was hidden from sight behind SS Kronprinz Wilhelm, also at anchor. Cubana had no damage below the waterline and Havana, laden with inbound New York passengers, suffered only superficial damage.

Striking firemen delayed Havana's departure in July 1911. The firemen were looking for an additional $0.15 per day for meals while the ship was in port. A. G. Smith, General Manager of the Ward Line, agreed to that concession, allowing the Havana to get underway after a two-hour delay.

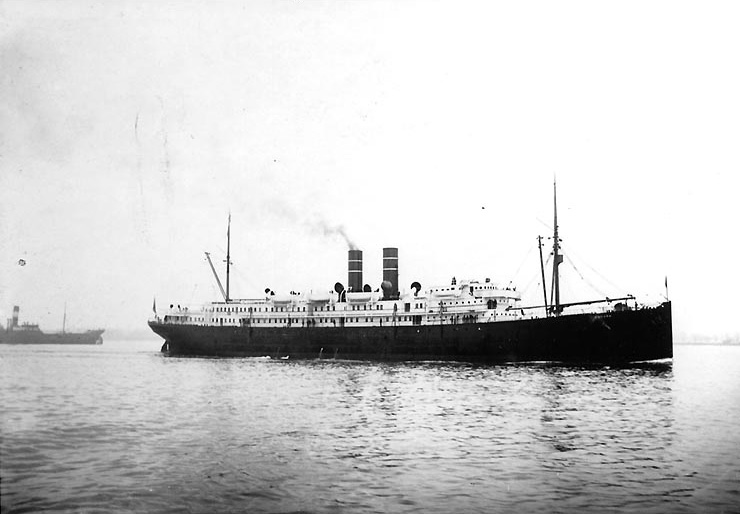
Ward liner SS Havana before World War I

Several times in 1912, amidst an outbreak of bubonic plague in the Caribbean, Havana operated in violation of Cuban and U.S. quarantine rules. In July 1912, the liner prepared to depart Cuba without an inspection and fumigation, but faced the prospect of seven days quarantine in Havana before the ship would be allowed to depart. However, a compromise was worked out by the United States Marine Hospital Service which allowed Havana to depart after a one-day delay. In September of the same year, another inspection gaffe resulted in government prosecution of the Ward Line.

On 23 May 1917 Havana and sister ship Saratoga, another Ward Line steamer, were requisitioned by the War Department for U.S. Army use during World War I.

== World War I ==
After her requisition by the U.S. government, Havana was turned over to the United States Army on 24 May 1917 for service as a transport ship. She was hastily outfitted for trooping duties, and at daybreak on 14 June, USAT Havana, with fellow Army transport ships Saratoga, Tenadores, and Pastores, accompanied by cruisers Seattle, DeKalb, destroyers Wilkes, Terry, Roe, and converted yacht Corsair, set out from Ambrose Light for Brest, France. They were in the lead group of the first American troop convoy to France during World War I. Corsair was unable to maintain the 15 kn (17 mph; 28 km/h) pace and fell back, being replaced by destroyer Fanning from the second group.

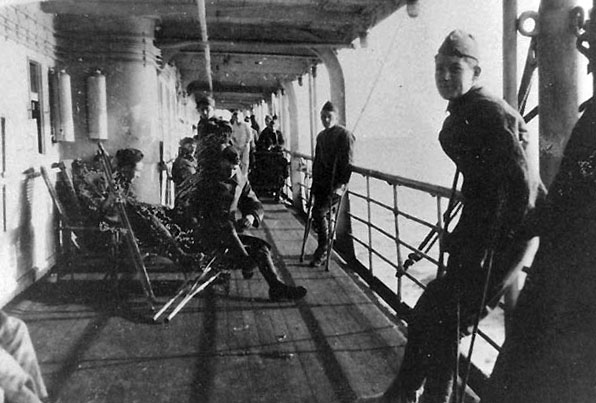
Wounded U.S. soldiers aboard Comfort, 1 December 1918

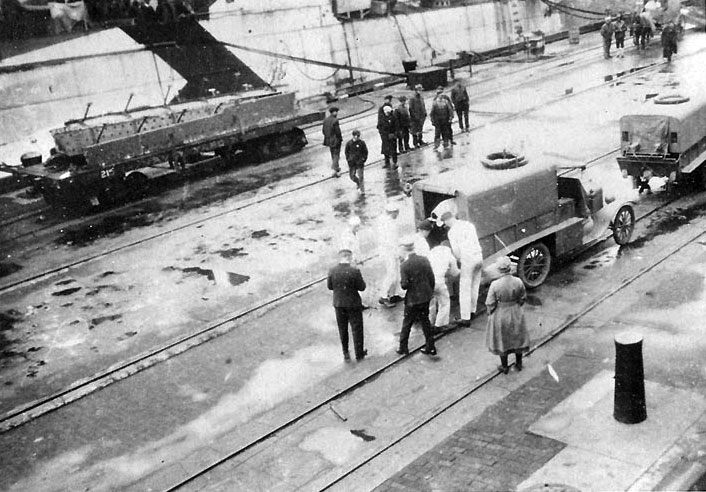
Wounded soldiers being unloaded from Comfort, December 1918

At 22:15 on 22 June, some 850 nmi (980 mi; 1,570 km) from its intended destination of Brest, Havana's group of the convoy was attacked by submarines. Two torpedoes passed near Havana and two torpedoes straddled DeKalb. No submarine was definitively sighted and the convoy, scattered by the alarm, reformed the next morning. The group, alerted by reports of submarine activity near Brest, diverted to Saint-Nazaire and arrived on 25 June.

Havana made only the one transatlantic crossing as an Army transport and was transferred to the U.S. Navy on 17 July. The ship was outfitted at the New York Navy Yard by the John N. Robins Co. of Brooklyn, New York; renamed Comfort on 14 March 1918; and commissioned 18 March 1918 with Medical Inspector C. M. Oman, USN, commanding. Comfort and Mercy (former Ward Line mate, Saratoga) were the first Navy hospital ships to have female nurses aboard, with a capacity of seven, including a chief nurse. Both ships were outfitted with state-of-the-art operating rooms, X-ray labs, rest rooms, and could accommodate 500 patients each.

After serving from 24 July – 5 October 1918 as a floating hospital at New York, Comfort joined the Cruiser and Transport Force of the Atlantic Fleet to return wounded men from Europe. In three voyages between 21 October 1918 and 13 March 1919, she brought home 1,183 men from France, Britain, and the Azores. She sailed from Charleston on 9 June for repairs at Mare Island Navy Yard where she went in ordinary 11 September 1919.

At Mare Island, Comfort had her boilers replaced and the electrical system was revamped, which entailed replacing all temporary wiring with permanent wiring and watertight fixtures. The crew quarters of the ship had also become infested with bedbugs from older German-style hospital bedding and remedies and eradication were performed. But Comfort had seen the end of her Navy service; she was decommissioned 5 August 1921, and was sold at Mare Island 1 April 1925.

Author and poet William Nelson Morell, in his book of poems related to Navy service during the war, was inspired to write these lines about Comfort:

They never billeted a better crew

That sailed out of any port
Than that which carried the wounded through

The war zone,—on the new "Comfort"

— "The U.S.S. Comfort (Hospital Ship)"

== Interwar civilian service ==
The former liner was reacquired by the Ward Line in 1927 and underwent a major refit – removal of one of its stacks and modernization of its interiors – at Todd Shipyard in Seattle, returning to passenger service in the following year. Havana was placed on the New York–Cuba service, where business thrived, in part because of Prohibition in the United States. Ward Line cruises to Havana were one of the quickest and least expensive ways to what one author called "alcohol-enriched vacations". The success of the Cuba routes attracted the attention of Cunard Line who added service from New York to Cuba with select cruises of Mauretania in 1928, a full season of cruises on Caronia in 1929, and the addition of Carmania the following season. This perceived threat to American shipping interests was met by the Ward Line by the acquisition of two new ships. The new ships, Oriente and Morro Castle, became the top of the line, and Havana was demoted to a third tier ship in terms of luxury and spaciousness, behind Siboney and Orizaba.

On 6 January 1935, Havana ran aground on Mantanilla Reef (27°22′N 78°41′W) north of The Bahamas. Although one passenger died of "apoplexy" during the evacuation of the ship, all the passengers were evacuated on the steamers El Oceano and Peten. These two steamers along with United States Coast Guard Cutters Vigilant and Pandora had come to the stricken ship's rescue. The ship had run aground in a well-known shoal area and near a visible marker buoy. The captain, Alfred W. Peterson, was found guilty of an "error in judgement in navigation" by using dead reckoning instead of more precise methods of setting course. The grounding of Havana was second of three public relations disasters that befell the Ward Line in a four-month span; the fire and sinking of Morro Castle in September 1934, and the sinking of Mohawk (chartered to replace the grounded Havana) on her maiden Ward Line voyage in January 1935, were the other two. After these three incidents, the "Ward Line" name was dropped in favor of the less familiar "Cuba Mail Line" moniker by July 1935.

Havana remained on the reef for three months before being refloated, repaired, and renamed SS Yucatán. Yucatán remained in passenger service for the Cuba Mail Line until 1940, when she was converted to a freighter. On 29 November 1940, Yucatán sank at her pier in New York. After again being refloated and repaired, the ship was renamed Agwileon and assigned to the Cuba Mail Lines parent organization, the Atlantic, Gulf, & West Indies Steamship Lines (the "AGWI Lines"), and remained in service as a freighter.

== World War II military service ==
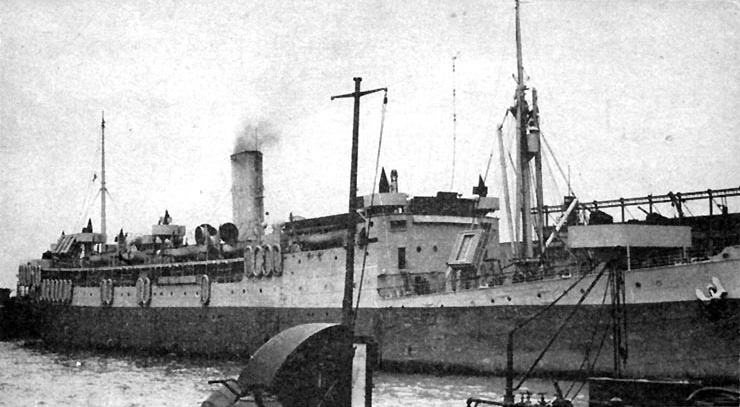
USAT Agwileon in mid 1943

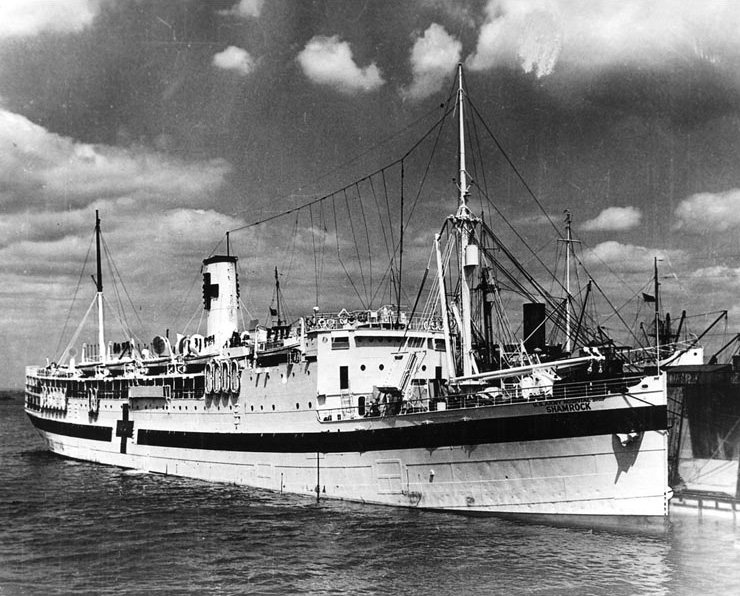
USAHS Shamrock in port, c. 1943–46

In April 1942, the Maritime Commission took control of SS Agwileon under a bareboat charter and used her to transport civilian technicians and advisors to Freetown, Sierra Leone, for the U.S. Army. After having boiler difficulties there, the ship then proceeded back to New York via Cape Town, Brazil, Trinidad, and Cuba. The voyage was completed in October.

The following month, the ship became USAT Agwileon when it was chartered by the Army, and underwent conversion to a troopship at the Atlantic Basin Iron Works in Brooklyn. With the conversion complete, the troopship left in April 1943 for Oran and Gibraltar, returning to New York in June. After this one voyage she was selected for conversion to a hospital ship.

Putting in at the Atlantic Basin Iron Works again in June, the ship was renamed USAHS Shamrock in August 1943. With the conversion complete, the new hospital ship left New York in September for Gibraltar and the Mediterranean where she operated locally, calling often at Oran, Palermo, the southern beaches of France, Bizerte, and Naples. By mid-February 1944, Shamrock had transported 11,989 patients before departing Gibraltar for Charleston (via Bermuda), where she arrived in early March. After undergoing some repairs and alterations at Charleston, Shamrock sailed again for Gibraltar for another tour of duty in the Mediterranean area from May to September. After transporting over 6,000 patients during this mission, she returned via Horta, Azores, to Charleston in late September.

In October, the hospital ship put in at Jacksonville for major repairs, before embarking on a final Mediterranean tour, arriving back in Charleston in April 1945. With the war in Europe winding down by this time, Shamrock underwent ventilation improvements at the Charleston Navy Yard intended for service in the Pacific. The repairs complete in September 1945, the hospital ship sailed for Los Angeles, arriving in October.

With no further need for hospital ships by that time, Shamrock was taken out of service. After the possibility of refitting the ship to carry home war brides was rejected, Shamrock was turned over to the War Shipping Administration at San Francisco on 4 February 1946, and placed in the National Defense Reserve Fleet (NDRF) at Suisun Bay, California. On 30 December 1947, Shamrock was sold to the Walter W. Johnson Co., and on 4 February 1948 was withdrawn from the NDRF for scrapping.
