= USS DeKalb =

German mail ship

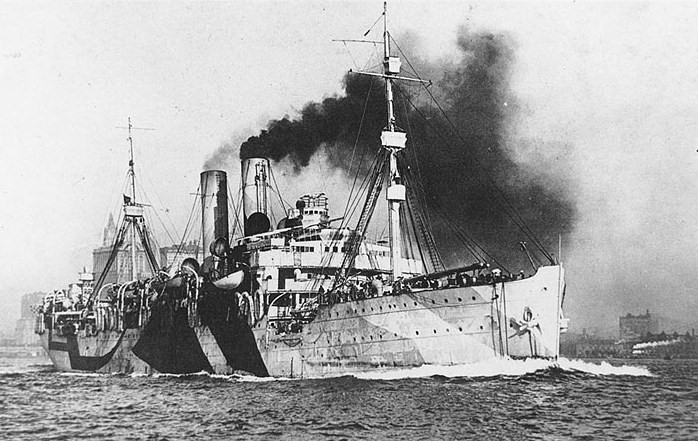
- The ship underway as USS DeKalb, circa 1918

History

German Empire
- Name: Prinz Eitel Friedrich
- Namesake: Prince Eitel Friedrich of Prussia
- Operator: North German Lloyd, then Kaiserliche Marine
- Port of registry: Bremen
- Route: Bremen - Tsingtao
- Builder: AG Vulcan, Stettin, Germany
- Cost: 4.895 million German Goldmark
- Launched: 18 June 1904
- Maiden voyage: 13 October 1904
- Reclassified: Auxiliary cruiser
- Captured: Interned April 1915
- Fate: Seized April 1917

United States
- Name: USS DeKalb
- Namesake: General Baron Johann de Kalb
- Operator: United States Navy; 1919 - United American Lines
- Route: New York - Hamburg (as liner)
- Recommissioned: 12 May 1917
- Decommissioned: 22 September 1919
- Renamed: SS Mount Clay
- Reclassified: Troop ship; transatlantic liner 1919–
- Refit: 1917 (as troop ship); 1920 (as immigrant ship, all 3d class)
- Identification: ID-3010
- Fate: Scrapped 1934

General characteristics
- Tonnage: 8,865 GRT
- Displacement: 14,180 long tons (14,410 t)
- Length: 506 ft 6 in (154.38 m)
- Beam: 55 ft 6 in (16.92 m)
- Draft: 26 ft (7.9 m)
- Installed power: 7,500 bhp (5,600 kW)
- Propulsion: 2 quadruple expansion steam engines, 2 screws
- Speed: 15 knots (28 km/h)
- Capacity: (as passenger liner) 158 1st Class, 156 2nd Class, 48 3rd class, plus 706 'tween deck passengers (when not in mail service); (as immigrant ship, 1920) 1,452 3rd class/steerage
- Complement: (as passenger liner) 222 men; (as troop ship) 534 officers and enlisted crew; (as immigrant ship, 1920) 211 crew
- Armament: 4 × 105 mm (4.1 in) guns, 6 × 88 mm (3.5 in) guns

USS DeKalb (ID-3010) was the German mail ship Prinz Eitel Friedrich that served during the early part of the First World War as an auxiliary cruiser (Hilfkreuzer) in the Imperial German Navy and later after the US entry into the war, as a US Navy troop ship. Post war she returned to civilian service as the US transatlantic liner SS Mount Clay.

== German civilian service ==
The ship was a North German Lloyd (NDL) mail ship and ocean liner built by AG Vulcan, Stettin, Germany, and launched on 18 June 1904 as Prinz Eitel Friedrich. NDL had ordered her for the German Mail route between Germany and the Far East, for which she began her maiden voyage on 13 October.

== German auxiliary cruiser ==
When the First World War broke out on 1 August 1914 she was in Shanghai, China and was ordered to Tsingtao in the then German Kiaochow Bay concession. There she was quickly converted to an auxiliary cruiser for the Imperial German Navy by transferring the guns and crews of the German gunboats SMS Tiger and SMS Luchs to Prinz Eitel Friedrich.

For the next seven months she operated on the high seas with Vice Admiral Maximilian von Spee's squadron off South American and then as a detached commerce raider. She sank or captured eleven ships in the Pacific and the South Atlantic. Among these was the schooner William P. Frye, captured on 27 January 1915 and scuttled the next day, the first U.S. flagged vessel sunk in World War I.

On 11 March 1915 Prinz Eitel Friedrich, now low on supplies and burdened by over 300 prisoners, arrived at Newport News, Virginia. Allied warships were lying outside US waters and to avoid them she exceeded the time limit under international law for a combatant ship to remain in a neutral port. As a result, the US authorities interned her. Later she was moved, still under the German flag, to Philadelphia Navy Yard. On 11 April another NDL liner that had been operating as an auxiliary cruiser, Kronprinz Wilhelm, was interned alongside her.

== US troop ship ==
When the United States entered the First World War in April 1917, US Customs officials seized her and she was transferred to the US Navy. She was reconditioned and refitted as a troop transport and renamed USS DeKalb after General Baron Johann de Kalb. She was commissioned 12 May 1917.

DeKalb was assigned to the Cruiser and Transport Force, Atlantic Fleet, and on 14 June 1917 sailed in the convoy carrying the first troops of the American Expeditionary Forces to France. Unlike the other transports with Army troops embarked, DeKalb transported United States Marine Corps, 5th Regiment of Marines. In the next 18 months DeKalb made 11 such voyages, carrying 11,334 soldiers safely. Among these was the First Marine Aviation Force who flew the day wing bombers of the Northern Bombing Group. With the end of the war, DeKalb continued her transport duty returning 20,332 troops from Europe in eight voyages. On 6 September 1919 she was turned over to the Commandant, 3rd Naval District.

== United American Lines ==
DeKalb was decommissioned 22 September 1919 and returned to the United States Shipping Board for disposal the following day. She returned to civilian control, initially as DeKalb and, after 1920, as Mount Clay.

The ship was acquired by W. Averell Harriman and included with ten previous ships acquired from the Kerr Navigation Company in a name change so that all were prefixed with an American mountain and thus renamed Mount Clay. The ship was specially modified by Morse Dry Dock and Repair Company to be a third class only (described as "first class steerage") immigrant ship for the United American Line of New York. The ship was gutted by fire, which began early 15 December 1919, while on the Hudson River at Spuyten Duyvil. Lt. Cmdr. William A. Willetts and his crew were rescued by a tugboat, and it took fireboats several hours to quell the blaze. During the rebuilding extensive tearing out of damaged decking, plating, and dismantling and rebuilding of deck structures was undertaken.

The intent of the conversion was to carry the maximum passenger load while offering passengers better conditions than usually found on immigrant ships and "steerage" class. The passenger spaces were to be well ventilated with forced draft air flow, more deck space allocated to passengers and larger and more attractive public rooms provided. Passenger accommodation was in two to six person cabins that included luxuries not usually found in such ships that included washstands, mattresses and linens. A kosher abattoir and galley was furnished for the ship's Jewish passengers. Due to a capacity of 1,452 passengers and crew of 211, special attention had to be focused on life boats. Fourteen sets of Welin davits were fitted to each side with a variety of lifeboats and some rafts with a capacity for 1,663 persons, 1,613 in boats.

In February 1921 Mount Clay inaugurated a new first class mail delivery system for mail to Germany in which mail planes would meet the ship at Cuxhaven for transfer of special bags for air delivery within Germany. On 9 February 1921 Mount Clay stood by and rescued the crew and ship's cat from the sinking freighter Bombardier about four hundred miles southeast of Halifax. The sinking ship's radio operator, Edward Herno, had worked hours to make repairs and get the SOS out as the wireless had been severely damaged in the storm and wreck. All but two of Bombardier's lifeboats had been destroyed so one of the Mount Clay boats launched to assist.

Mount Clay made the initial voyage as an immigrant ship on Christmas Day 1920 (Marine Review) or 26 December (DANFS). The ship's last westbound voyage was from Hamburg via Queenstown, Ireland to New York on 15 October 1925. She was then laid up until 1934 when she was scrapped.

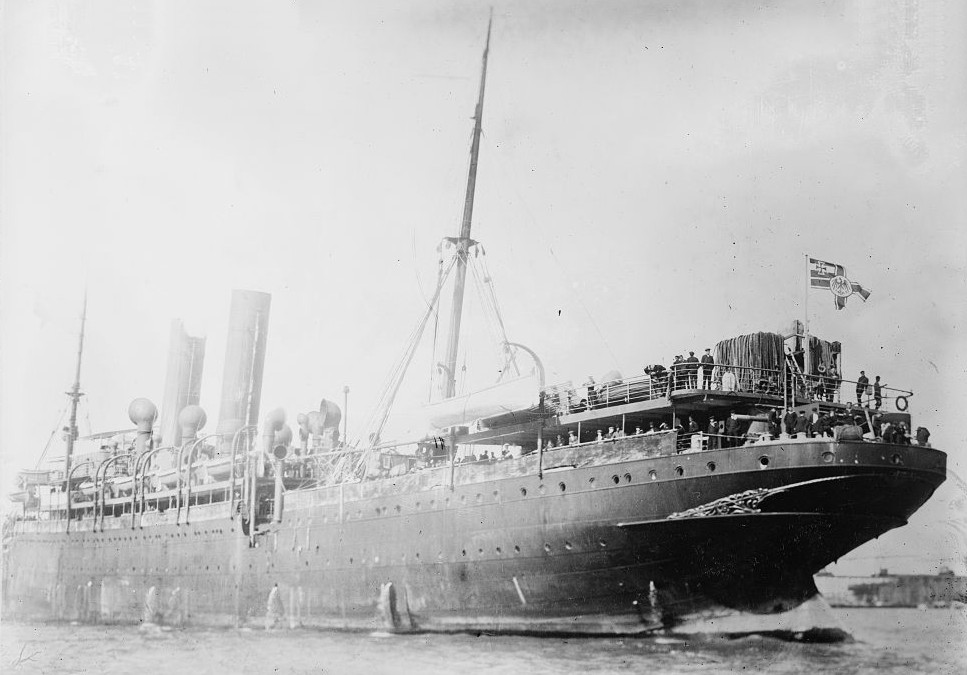
Prinz Eitel Friedrich flying the Imperial German Navy ensign

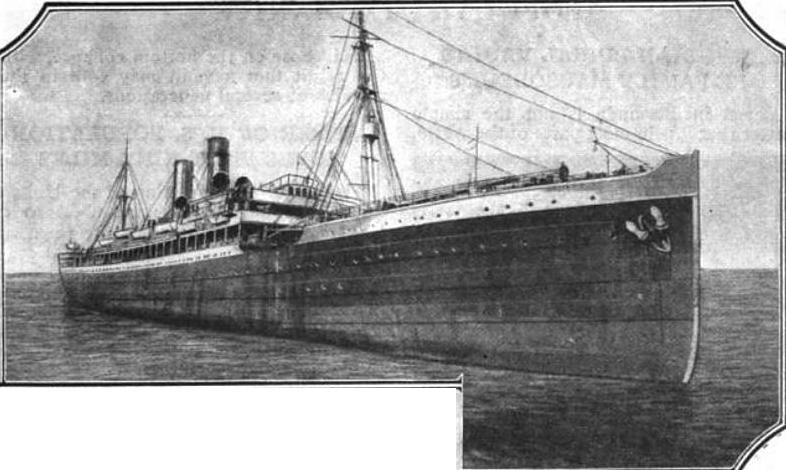
SS Mount Clay under way circa 1921

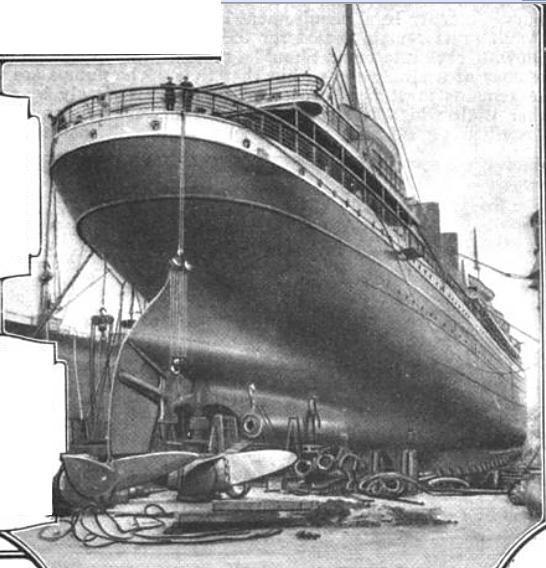
SS Mount Clay during refitting from changeover from USS DeKalb

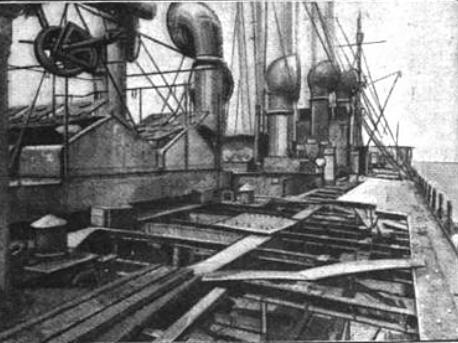
The deck of SS Mount Clay during refitting from changeover from USS DeKalb
