= USS Pastores =

Cargo ship of the United States Navy

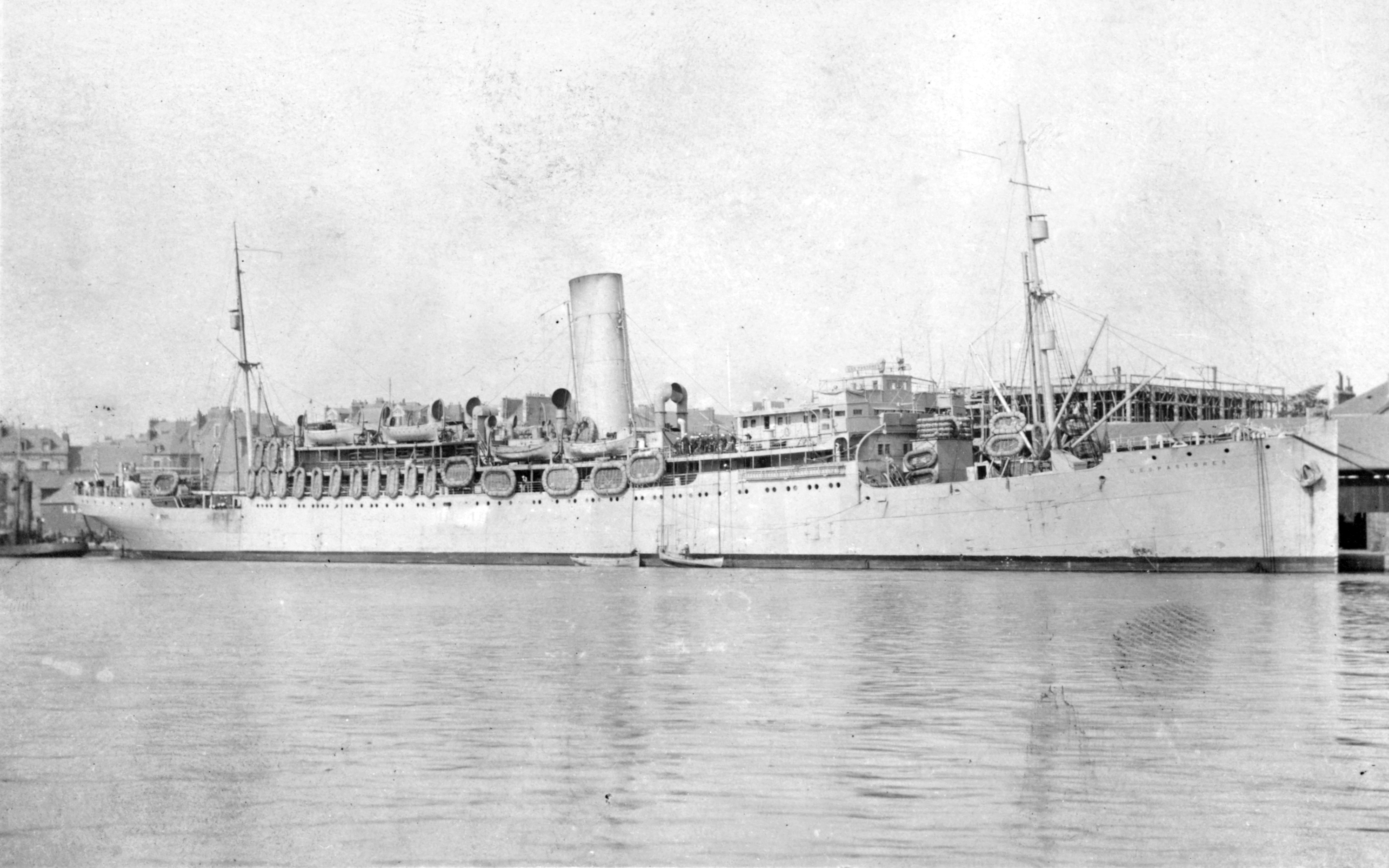

History

United States
- Name: USS Pastores
- Builder: Workman, Clark & Company, Belfast
- Launched: 17 August 1912
- Acquired: by charter, 1 May 1918
- Commissioned: as USS Pastores (ID-4540), 6 May 1918
- Decommissioned: 8 October 1919
- Fate: Returned to owner
- Acquired: by charter, 23 January 1942
- Commissioned: as USS Pastores (AF-16), 13 February 1942
- Decommissioned: 14 March 1946
- Stricken: 28 March 1946
- Honours and awards: 1 battle star (World War II)
- Fate: Sold for scrapping, 19 December 1946

General characteristics
- Class & type: Pastores-class store ship
- Tonnage: 2,300 tonnes deadweight (DWT)
- Displacement: 12,650 long tons (12,853 t) full load
- Length: 486 ft 6 in (148.29 m)
- Beam: 55 ft (17 m)
- Draft: 27 ft 4 in (8.33 m)
- Propulsion: Reciprocating engines; twin screws, 6,500 shp (4,847 kW)
- Speed: 15.5 knots (28.7 km/h; 17.8 mph)
- Armament: World War I : 4 × 5 in (130 mm) guns; 2 × 1-pounder guns; World War II : 1 × single 5"/38 caliber gun mount; 4 × 3"/50 caliber guns; 8 × 20 mm gun mounts

USS Pastores (AF-16) was a Pastores-class store ship acquired by the U.S. Navy during World War I and re-acquired during World War II. Pastores served as a stores ship, responsible for delivering supplies to military personnel in combat and non-combat areas. She served in both World War I and II, and was awarded one battle star during World War II.

== Service history ==
Pastores was built by Workman, Clark & Company, Ltd., Belfast, Northern Ireland in 1912; acquired by the U.S. Navy from United Fruit Company on 1 May 1918; and commissioned on 6 May 1918.

=== World War I ===
Pastores was one of the merchant ships chartered by the Navy during World War I to transport U.S. forces to Europe, through submarine-infested waters. Pastores began this service in the closing months of 1917, and she encountered several submarines during her early Naval service.

Departing New York in convoy on 20 December 1917, she was 900 miles off the coast of France in January 1918, when a submarine appeared astern. President Grant, one of the ships of the convoy, fired one shot at the submarine, which was not seen again. On 9 January, after the convoy had been joined by destroyer escort in the Bay of Biscay, a submarine attacked; the convoy fired 15 shots at the boat, not seen again. Pastores sighted submarines again during convoy crossings in August and September.

After war's end, Pastores transported troops back to the United States. She decommissioned and was returned to the United Fruit Company on 8 October 1919 and served on the West Indies–Central American run until 20 December 1941, when acquired by War Shipping Administration, from whom the Navy again chartered her.

=== World War II ===
On 23 January 1942 the Navy reacquired her on bareboat charter; she recommissioned 13 February 1942 as AF-16. Serving as a provision store ship, Pastores carried food and war material for the Allies. Serving under Com Service Force Atlantic in 1942, Pastores proceeded into the submarine-infested Caribbean. On 16 June she picked up 36 survivors of SS Arkansan, victim of U-126. Later in the month, she stopped Italian tankers Arcola and Taigeter but, after investigation, let them pass. Pastores supplied forces on Trinidad, Cuba, Bermuda, and other Caribbean islands with fresh food and returned to the United States with full cargoes of sugar. Pastores continued this duty until transiting the Panama Canal in November 1943 to join the war against Japan.

Operating from San Francisco, California, and Pearl Harbor in 1944, the ship discharged her chilled and frozen cargo to the fighting fleet and shore bases in the Ellice, Gilbert, Marshall, and New Hebrides Islands. Stopping at Espiritu Santo, Milne Bay, Finschhafen, and Biak with fresh holiday provisions from San Francisco in early October, she finished unloading her cargo at San Pedro Bay, Leyte. The first reefer ship at Leyte Gulf after the invasion, she arrived before receiving facilities were ready on the beach and thus dodged Japanese aircraft until able to unload.

From San Pedro Bay, she proceeded to the Admiralties and New Zealand. For almost a year, she carried food supplies to New Guinea ports, the Philippines, Palaus, Admiralties, Solomons, and Russell Islands. With the end of war in sight, she headed for Pearl Harbor, where she received word of the victory. In October she departed San Francisco with fresh holiday food for forces on Leyte.

Returning to San Francisco, Pastores decommissioned on 14 March 1946 and was transferred to War Shipping Administration. She was struck from the Naval Vessel Register on 28 March 1946 and was sold to Walter W. Johnson Co. for scrapping 19 December 1946.
