= Stanley Kimmel =

American writer and composer (1894–1982)

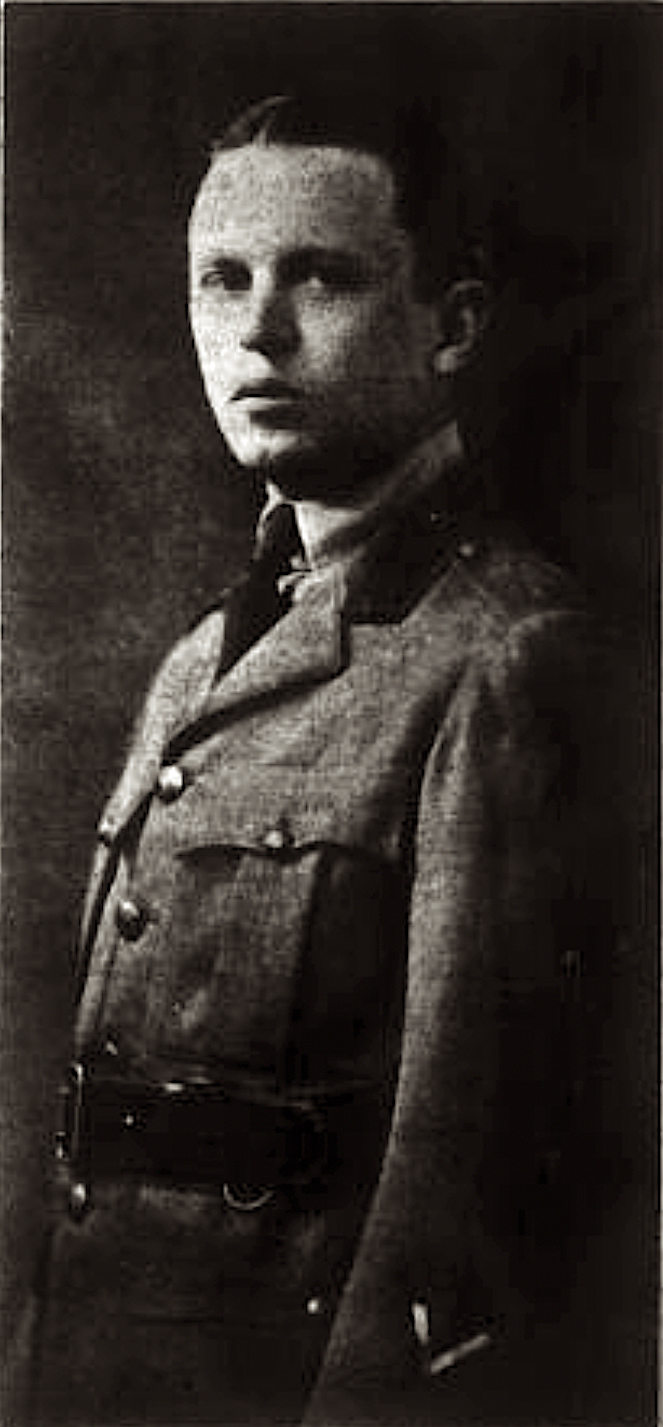
Stanley Kimmel

Stanley Preston Kimmel (June 12, 1894 – July 28, 1982) was an American historian, journalist, poet, novelist, composer, pianist, and playwright. He is best remembered for his 1940 book The Mad Booths of Maryland which gives a detailed history of the Booth family. This was followed by further history books covering the era of the American Civil War, including Mr. Lincoln's Washington (1957) and Mr. Davis's Richmond (1958).

Born in Du Quoin, Illinois, Kimmel originally intended to become a musician and graduated from Ernest R. Kroeger's Kroeger School of Music in St. Louis in 1912. After this, he studied law at the University of Southern California (USC) during which time he published his first short volume of poetry. A member of the Lost Generation, he left USC in his third year to travel to France during World War I, where he worked for the French Red Cross as an ambulance driver. His experiences in the war were the basis of his 1919 serialized novel Crucifixion. He went to China in 1919, where he worked for English language publications for approximately a year. His experiences in Asia were the basis for his book Leaves on the Water – Sketches of the Far East (1922).

For part of the early 1920s, Kimmel lived in Paris, where he became acquainted with several prominent American writers, among them Ernest Hemingway. He came back to the United States, where he worked as a journalist and editor for a variety of publications. He wrote several plays, the best known of which was Black Diamond. It was staged on Broadway in 1933. This play, along with his poetry book The Kingdom of Smoke (1932), was centered around mining in the coal fields of Southern Illinois in the region where Kimmel spent his childhood. In his later life, he lived in Florida and died in Sarasota at the age of 88.

== Early life and education ==
The son of Daniel L. Kimmel and Edith Preston Kimmel, Stanley Preston Kimmel was born in Du Quoin, Illinois on June 12, 1894. His father operated a lumber business and was also a small town lawyer. His mother was an amateur poet and artist. He received his early education at schools in his native city and in Cincinnati, Ohio. A gifted musician, he began composing music at the age of 13 and originally intended to pursue a career as an instrumentalist and composer.

Kimmel attended Walther College (a Lutheran high school) in Saint Louis, Missouri while simultaneously pursuing training as a professional musician at Ernest R. Kroeger's Kroeger School of Music (KSM). He studied piano with Charles Kunkel in addition to taking lessons with Kroeger. He graduated from the KSM in 1912. In addition to playing the piano, Kimmel was also a violinist. He performed his own composition for violin, Prelude for Violin, at a concert in St. Louis in June 1912.

He completed his pre-college education at the Tome School in Maryland. After graduating, he studied law at the University of Southern California. His book of verse, Poems and Fantasies, was published by the Grafton Publishing Company in 1916. He was known as a pianist in Los Angeles during his college years.

== World War I and Kimmel's writing on war ==
A member of the Lost Generation, Kimmel left for France in late 1916 during his third year of law school in the midst of World War I with the intention of enlisting in the Lafayette Escadrille (LE). He traveled to France with William Gardner, the son of Missouri's 34th Governor, Frederick D. Gardner. He was unable to join the LE, but was engaged as an ambulance driver on the Western Front with a French Red Cross unit funded by J. P. Morgan. It worked in assistance to the French Army.

Kimmel served ten months on the front in the Verdun area with his responsibilities including transporting wounded soldiers from the battlefield and hauling ammunition to French positions. His work ended after he was wounded and temporarily disabled when a German shell struck near his ambulance. He also suffered lung damage from a gas attack during a battle on Côte 304 in Le Mort Homme. He was the recipient of three medals for his war service.

After being wounded, Kimmel returned to the United States but not without misadventure. In October 1917 he was a passenger aboard SS Antilles; a passenger ship heading from Saint Nazaire in France back to the United States. This ship was sunk by a German U-boat on October 17, 1917 Kimmel survived the event and was rescued. He returned to the United States in December 1917. While back in the United States he enlisted in the U.S. Navy Air Corps. He was in training at a base in Seattle, Washington at the time of the Armistice of 11 November 1918. After this he briefly settled in San Francisco, California in 1919 where he published poetry on his war experience. We wrote two short volumes of verses published in 1919 by the San Francisco press The Publishers of Little Books: Souvenirs and Improvisations.

The horrors Kimmel witnessed during WWI became the subject of his novel Crucifixion; a work originally published in 1919 as a serialized novel in the Overland Monthly. The work details his experiences recovering injured men from the battlefield, driving an ambulance in a war zone under enemy fire, and caring for the dying. It was subsequently published in book form in New York City by the Gothic Publishing Company in 1922.

== Post-War ==
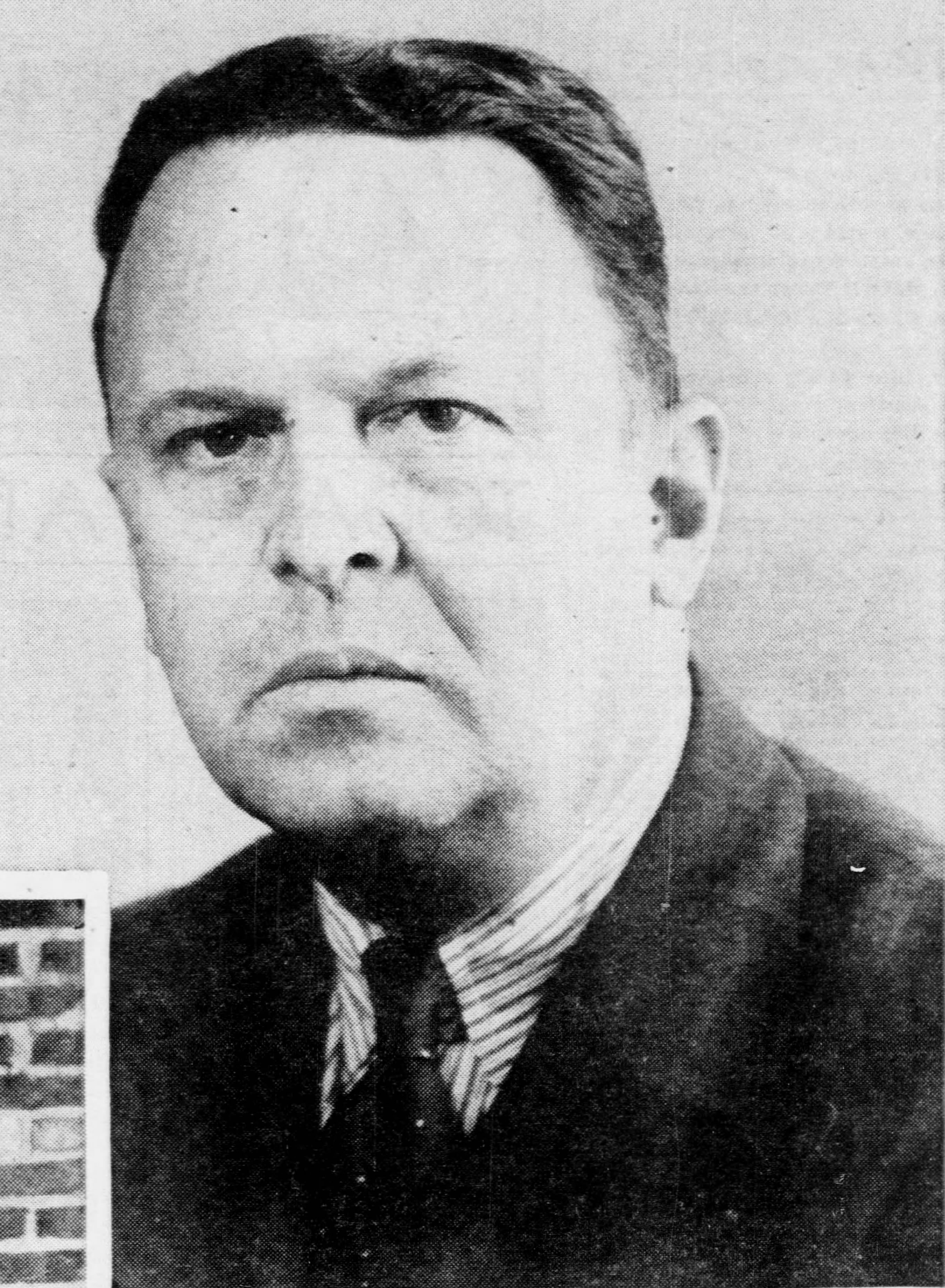
Kimmel in 1940

By August 1919, Kimmel had departed San Francisco for China. He spent time living in Asia where he worked for a variety of English language publications as a journalist and editor. His experiences there informed his book, Leaves on the Water – Sketches of the Far East (1922, published by Thomas Seltzer). He wrote a second book of short stories, The Kingdom of Smoke (1932, published by Nicholas L. Brown), and another volume of poetry, The Strange Voyage (1921, Publishers of Little Books).

He lived in Paris in the early 1920s. There he became an acquaintance of F. Scott Fitzgerald, Ernest Hemingway, Archibald MacLeish, and a close friend of Ezra Pound. Kimmel stated in an interview, that he didn't like Hemingway upon meeting him, and that Hemingway repeatedly tried to get Kimmel to engage in boxing matches with him; invitations he declined. Hemingway later married one of Kimmel's ex-girlfriends, the journalist Pauline Pfeiffer.

After leaving Paris, Kimmel worked as a journalist for the Chicago Daily News where he developed a close friendship with his colleague at the paper, the writer Carl Sandburg. He returned to Europe and spent time living in Germany in 1924.

He authored the play, Black Diamond, a folk drama based partly on his experiences growing up in the coal fields of Southern Illinois, and partly on the events of the Herrin massacre of 1922. It was staged on Broadway at the Provincetown Playhouse in 1933 with a cast that included Margaret Barker and Kate McComb. In 1936 he went to Washington D.C. to do research for a biography he was writing on John Wilkes Booth. The resulting book, The Mad Booths of Maryland, was published by the Bobbs-Merrill Company in 1940. It was republished by Dover Press in 1970. While working on the Booth biography, he was employed as a features writer for The Washington Star.

During World War II, he worked as a journalist connected to the United States Army, including writing in-depth coverage of the Dachau concentration camp. He was employed by the Office of the Coordinator of Inter-American Affairs during the 1940s after having moved to Washington D.C. in 1942. His book Mr. Lincoln's Washington was published in 1957. His book Mr. Davis's Richmond was published in 1958. In June 1959, he married child psychologist Dr. Elsie Marr.

Kimmel died in Sarasota, Florida on July 28, 1982.
