= Rosalie Balmer Smith Cale =

American pianist (1875–1958)

Rosalie Balmer Smith Cale (née Rosalie Balmer Smith, September 24, 1875 – January 4, 1958) was an American pianist and composer, whose operettas were performed in St. Louis, Missouri, and New York.

Cale was born in St. Louis, Missouri, to a musical family. Her parents were Rosalie T. Balmer ("Sally") and Thaddeus Smith. Her mother composed several pieces for violin. Her maternal grandfather was Charles Balmer, head of the Balmer & Weber Music Company in St. Louis. Her paternal grandfather, the actor Sol Smith, owned and operated the St. Louis Theatre. She married the violinist Charles Allen Cale in 1897.

Cale studied music first with her mother and grandparents, then with Abraham I. Epstein and Ernest R. Kroeger. She taught in St. Louis for over 30 years. Her papers are archived at the Missouri Historical Society.

== Compositions ==
Cale's music was published by Balmer & Weber. Her compositions include:

=== Dance ===
- Masque of Pandora (based on a poem by Henry Wadsworth Longfellow)

=== Operetta ===
- Four Pecks or A Bushel of Fun (performed in New York as Cupid's Halloween)
- Love, Powder and Patches (text by Alice E. Hellmers)
- Summer: A Flirtation (text by William C. Unger)

=== Piano ===
- "Idyl"

=== Vocal ===
- "Master and Pupil" (text by William C. Unger)
