= Ernest R. Kroeger =

American composer (1862–1934)

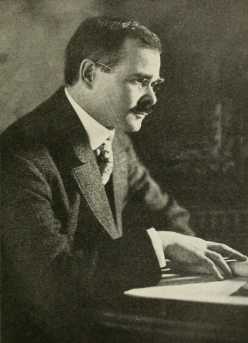
- Born: August 10, 1862; St. Louis, Missouri
- Died: April 7, 1934 (aged 71); St. Louis, Missouri
- Occupation: Composer
- Spouse: Laura A. Clark (m. 1891)
- Children: 4, including Richard Clark and Louise Kroeger
- Parents: Adolph Ernst Kroeger (father); Eliza Bertha Curren Kroeger (mother)

Ernest Richard Kroeger (August 10, 1862 – April 7, 1934) was an American composer. He is mainly known for the pedagogical works he composed for piano; he also taught music in St. Louis, Missouri. Today his papers are held at the Missouri Historical Society.

== Early life ==
Ernest R. Kroeger was born in St. Louis, Missouri to Adolph Ernst Kroeger and Eliza Bertha Curren Kroeger. He attended public school and began his musical studies at the age of five. His father, who was an amateur musician, taught him piano. He also learned instrumentation, violin, and harmony under various other teachers, including Egmont Froelich, Ernst Spiering, Charles Kunkel, Wilhelm Goldner, and W. Malméne. At the age of fifteen, he went into the mercantile life only to return to music several years later. He became the organist for various churches around St. Louis, including Trinity Episcopal and the Unitarian Church of the Messiah. Kroeger married on October 10, 1891, to a Miss Laura A. Clark from Lebanon, Missouri. Together they had four children.

== Middle age ==
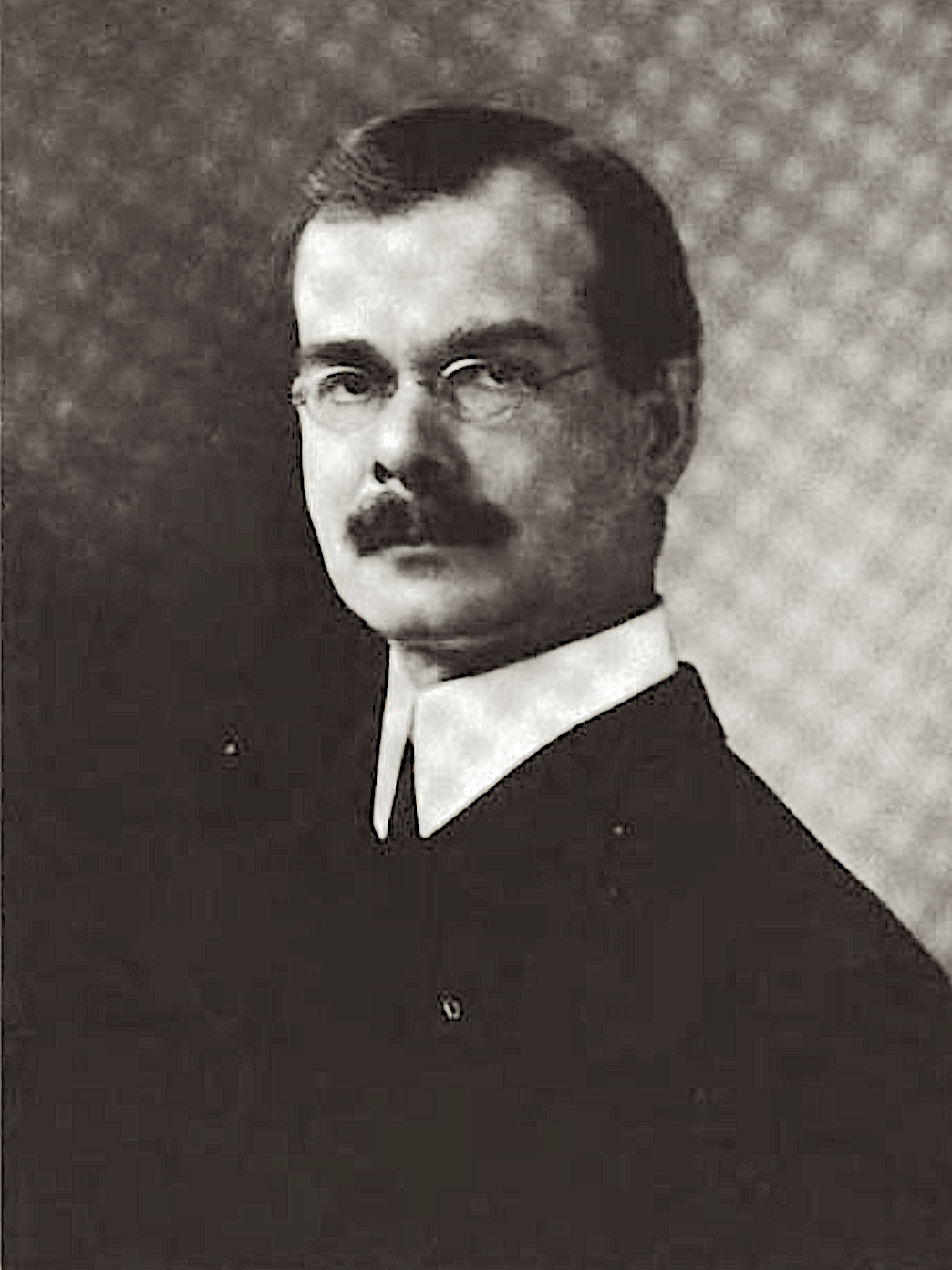
Ernest R. Kroeger

When Kroeger was 42, he was appointed the Master of Programs of the Bureau of Music and responsible for musical programming for the St. Louis World's Fair. Rather than emphasizing brass band music as the fair planners had envisioned, Kroeger was intent on including a range of musical styles, composers and media which ultimately enhanced the status of music at the fair. There, he arranged for choral, brass, and band concerts as well as competitions for them as well. Because so many people enjoyed the concerts he put together at the World Fair, the French Academy elected him an Officer. Other institutes he joined were the National Institute of Arts of Letters, and the American Guild of Organists, which he also helped found.

The same year that he was the Master of Programs for the St. Louis World Fair he became the Director of the Kroeger School of Music, and kept that position until he died. His students included Rosalie Balmer Smith Cale and Frances Marion Ralston. In 1915, he was elected to the American Academy of Arts and Letters (then the National Institute of Arts and Letters). In 1925, he became Director of the Washington University in St. Louis Music Department until 1934. He was also the Director of the Music Department for Forest Park College.

Ernest R. Kroeger died in St. Louis on April 7, 1934.

== Legacy ==
Kroeger's compositions were played all around the United States and Europe during the first couple decades of the 20th century. After Kroeger died in 1934, his daughter, Louise Kroeger, succeeded her father in becoming the Director of the Kroeger School of Music until her retirement in 1975, when she was 84. His son, Richard Clark, served in the World War as a color sergeant of the three hundred and fifty-third infantry of the eighty-ninth division.

== Citations ==
- Washington University Libraries
