= SS Antilles (1906) =

American passenger-cargo ship

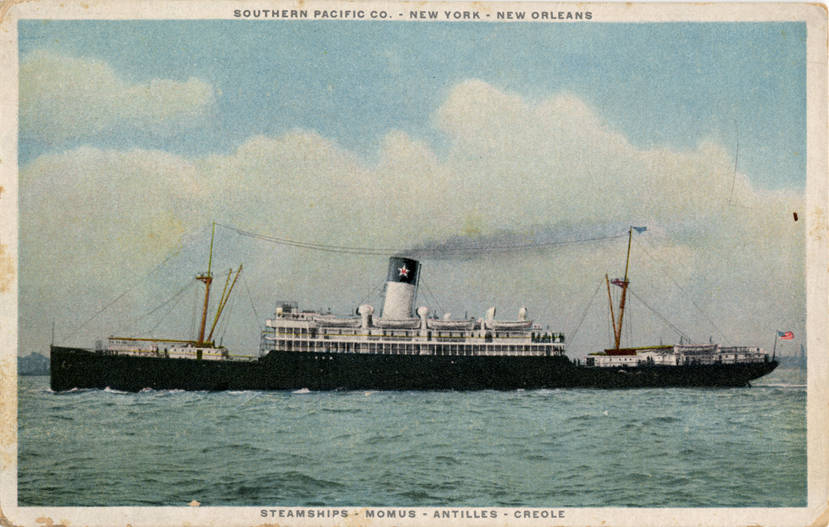
- Postcard of Antilles

History

United States
- Name: Antilles
- Operator: Southern Pacific SS Co; US Army Chartered Transport 1917
- Builder: William Cramp & Sons, Philadelphia
- Launched: December 3, 1906
- Identification: US official number 204018; code letters KWBN; by 1913: call sign KKA
- Fate: Sunk October 17, 1917

General characteristics
- Type: Passenger-cargo ship
- Tonnage: 6,878 GRT 4,326 NRT
- Displacement: 10,500 tons (normal coal supply)
- Length: 421 ft 11.5 in (128.6 m) on load line; 410.0 ft (125.0 m) registered
- Beam: 53.2 ft (16.2 m)
- Draft: mean: 26 ft (7.9 m)
- Depth: 25.6 ft (7.8 m)
- Decks: 3
- Installed power: 860 NHP
- Propulsion: 1 × triple-expansion engine; 1 × screw

SS Antilles was a US passenger-cargo ship launched in 1906. Chartered by the United States Army in 1917 for use as a troop transport, Antilles was sunk by a German U-boat on October 17, 1917, resulting in the loss of 67 lives. At the time of its sinking Antilles was the single largest loss of US lives to that point in World War I.

== History ==
=== Construction ===
Antilles, US official number 204018, was a 6,879 GRT ship built in the shipyards of William Cramp & Sons Shipbuilding Company, Philadelphia, Pennsylvania delivered April 1907. Antilles was a twin screw steam vessel with nominal speed of 15 knots (28 km/h; 17 mph) and dimensions of 421 feet 11.5 inches (128.6 m) on load line, extreme beam 53.2 feet (16.2 m) and mean draft of 26 feet (7.9 m) with a displacement at normal coal supply of 10,500 tons.

The vessel was operated as a combined passenger and cargo ship by the Southern Pacific Steamship Company from the time of its launch until 1917. Antilles and sister ship Momus, along with several other ships, operated between New York and New Orleans with Southern Pacific Steamship's Morgan Line.

=== Destruction ===
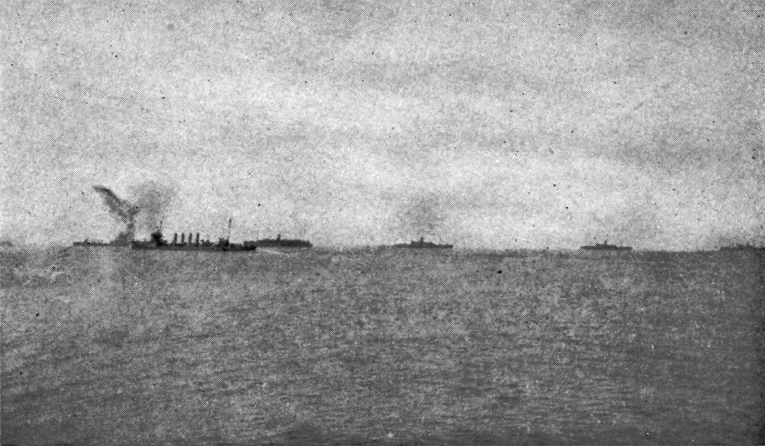
With America's first convoy. The troop ships are Henderson, Antilles, Momus and Lenape.

Following American entry into World War I, Antilles was selected by the Shipping Control Committee and was turned over May 26, 1917. The ship was then chartered by the United States Army for use as a civilian-crewed US Army Chartered Transport (USACT). (Note: Army owned vessels of the period were US Army Transports (USAT) while the WW I abbreviation for Army chartered civilian vessels was USACT (US Army Chartered Transport).) Antilles was in the first troop convoy to depart on June 14, after considerable confusion and delays in troop loading, from the Hoboken Port of Embarkation. The ship sailed from New York on September 24 in a four ship convoy, designated Group Number 8, composed of Antilles, a new Navy transport Henderson, another Army chartered transport Finland and another Army chartered ship that turned back, Lenape. The convoy made the crossing successfully but both Antilles and Finland were torpedoed on the return voyage.

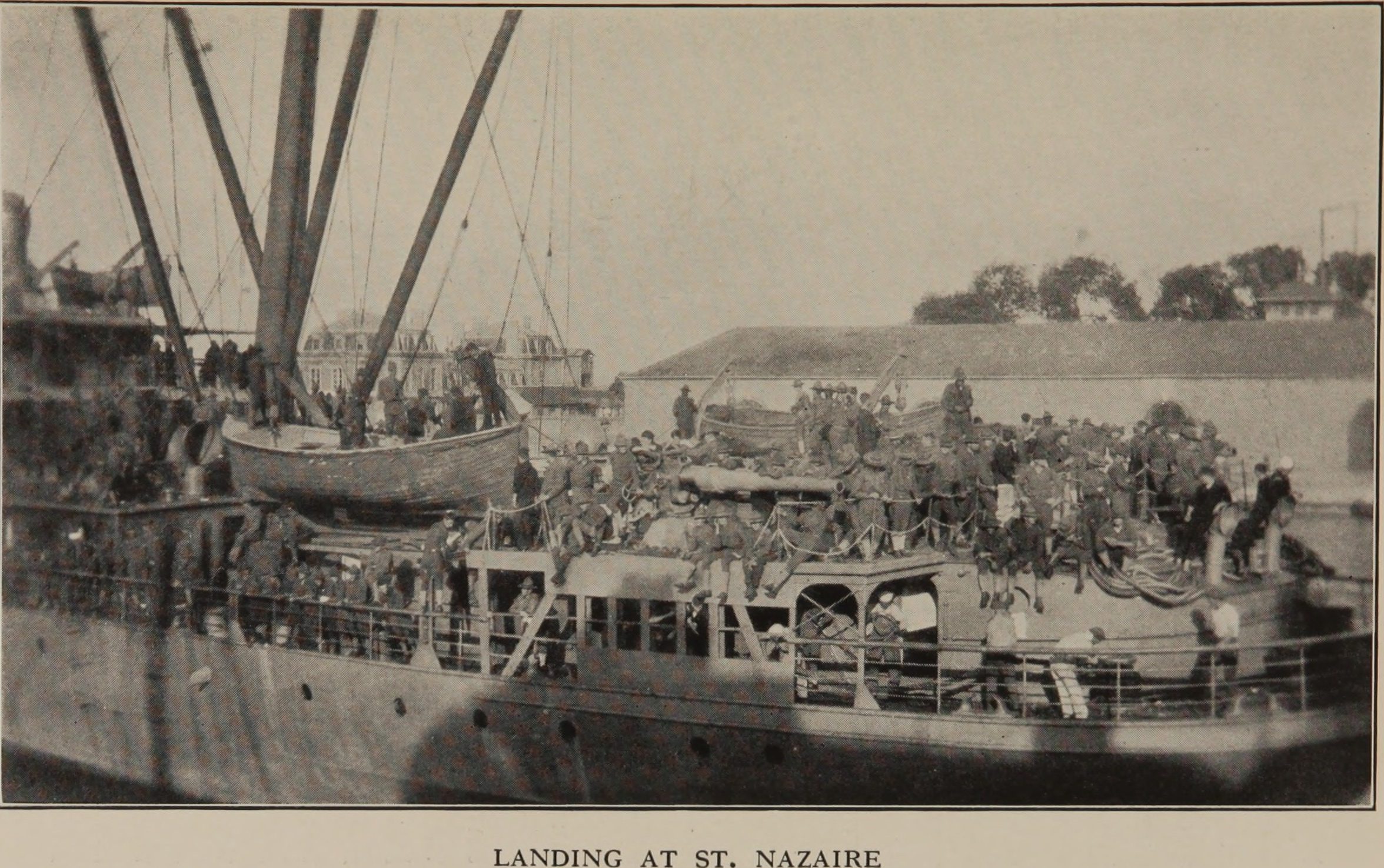
Landing US Army personnel at Saint-Nazaire

Antilles was torpedoed by U-62 on October 17, 1917, three days out of Saint Nazaire, France. The ship was in a small convoy composed of Antilles, Henderson and Willehad escorted by the patrol yachts USS Alcedo, USS Aphrodite, USS Corsair and USS Kanawha. The convoy had slowed after encountering rough weather and Kanawha was forced to turn back. During a course change at about 6:45 a.m., Antilles was astern of Corsair and suddenly veered out of formation and began settling by the stern, sinking in about four and a half minutes. Alcedo turned back to where Antilles had sunk and began picking up survivors. Corsair circled in search of the submarine until about 8:30 a.m. but found no sign of it. The search for survivors and the submarine was discontinued at 10:30 a.m.

Survivors of USACT Antilles were rescued by USS Alcedo

118 survivors were rescued by Alcedo and 50 by Corsair. Among those rescued was author Stanley Kimmel and Brigadier General William Sharp McNair, who was returning to take command of 151st Field Artillery Brigade. A total of 67 people died in the sinking. The loss of life was the first case in the war involving a large number of US casualties.

Survivors were returned to France on October 21 where they were cared for by the Red Cross. Those that died were some of the first to come under the new war-insurance law allowing payment of $6,000 ($150,800 in 2025) to the families in monthly installments of $25 ($630 in 2025) over twenty years.

== Bibliography ==
- Staff Correspondent (1917). "Survivors of the Antilles on Rafts 3 Hours". Chicago Tribune. Vol. LXXIV, no. October 28, 1917. Archived from the original on May 20, 2018.
- Colton, T. (September 3, 2014). "Cramp Shipbuilding, Philadelphia PA". Shipbuilding History. NT. Colton. Archived from the original on December 20, 2014.
- Crowell, Benedict; Wilson, Robert Forrest (1921). The Road to France II. How America Went to War. Yale university Press. ISBN 1601051131. LCCN 2006940346.
- Department of Commerce—Bureau of Navigation (1918). Merchant Vessels of the United States. Government Printing Office, Washington.
- Kidd, Isaac C. (1917). "Naval War Notes—Atlantic". United States Naval Institute Proceedings. 43 (July 1917). United States Naval Institute, Annapolis, Maryland.
- The Marconi Press Agency Ltd (1913). The Year Book of Wireless Telegraphy and Telephony. London: The St Katherine Press.
- Naval History And Heritage Command (January 31, 2006). "S.S. Antilles (American Passenger-Cargo Ship, 1907)". Online Library of Selected Images: Civilian Ships. Naval History And Heritage Command. Archived from the original on March 5, 2006.
- Naval History And Heritage Command. "Alcedo". Dictionary of American Naval Fighting Ships. Naval History And Heritage Command. Archived from the original on February 28, 2004.
- Naval History And Heritage Command. "Corsair". Dictionary of American Naval Fighting Ships. Naval History And Heritage Command. Archived from the original on March 15, 2004.
- Pacific American Steamship Association; Shipowners Association of the Pacific Coast (1917). "The Port of New Orleans". Pacific Marine Review. 14 (April 1917). J.S. Hines, San Francisco, California.
- Paine, Ralph Delahaye (1920). The Corsair in the War Zone. Hugh Mifflin Company, Riverside Press Cambridge. LCCN 20014468.
- Russell, Richard M. (1919). The 151st Field Artillery Brigade. The Cornhill Company, Boston. LCCN 20007273.
