= Charles Balmer =

German-American musician, music publisher, pianist, conductor (1817–1892)

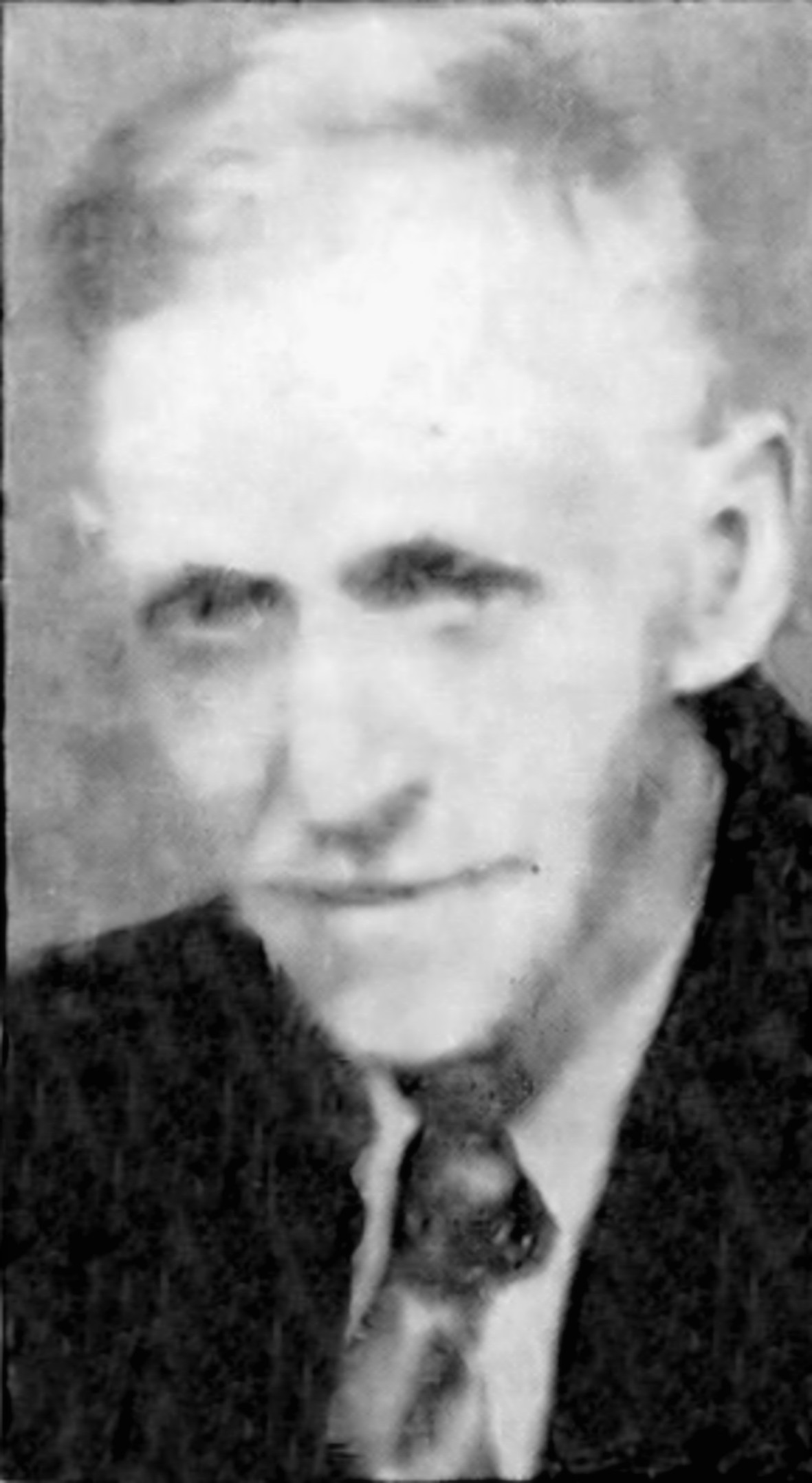
Portrait of Charles Balmer

Charles Balmer (September 21, 1817 – December 15, 1892), pseudonyms: Charles Remlab, T. van Berg, Alphonse Leduc, Charles Lange, Henry Werner, August Schumann, T. Meyer, F. B. Rider, was a German-American violinist, pianist, organist, composer, conductor, choir director, concert organizer, and music publisher in St. Louis, where, as part of the first generation of German emigrants to the USA, he was part to the musical life of Missouri in the second half of the 19th century.

== Life ==
Karl Balmer grew up as the eldest son of Gottfried Balmer (died 1846) and his wife Eva, née Heyse (died 1875), in a wealthy, educated family in Mühlhausen, Thuringia. Balmer showed musical talent from an early age and was taken by his father to Göttingen for further musical education, presumably with Heinrich Wilhelm Jacobi. At the age of nine, he received a prize from Louis Spohr for playing a work by Spohr. At ten, he played first violin in the orchestra. At sixteen, he was assistant to the conductor.

In 1836, his father emigrated with the family in the USA to St. Louis, Missouri. Charles Balmer himself headed first to New Orleans, to make use of his musical skills there. He then spent two years in Mobile, Alabama, and Augusta, Georgia. According to other sources, he also lived in Atlanta for some times. In 1839, he accompanied the English soprano Rosalbina Caradori-Allan on her tour of the USA, which also took him to St. Louis. He settled in St. Louis that same year.

He participated in the US tour of the Swedish soprano Jenny Lind in the early 1850s and had a lasting friendship with her. Years after Lind's return to Europe, he visited her there.

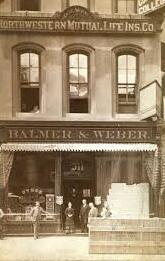
Store of Balmer & Weber

He taught and organized concerts, during which he met the German-born singer Theresa Weber (11 May 1820 in Koblenz Ehrenbreitstein – 1 November 1904 in St. Louis). Weber und Balmer married in 1841. As early as the 1840s, Balmer accompanied soloists such as Ole Bull and Henri Vieuxtemps in their performances in St. Louis. From the 1840s onward, he was the organist at an Episcopal Church in St. Louis which had been dedicated in 1841, and Balmer remained in this position for over 46 years. 1846 he founded the St. Louis Oratorio Society which he also conducted. In 1848 he founded with his brother-in-law Heinrich Weber the music publishing house Balmer & Weber which until 1907 published not only Balmer's own works – including those published under his pseudonyms – but also numerous other European and American composers of the 19th century, such as Franz Abt, Joseph Labitzky, Henry Rowley Bishop, Paul Dresser, Charles Galloway and in 1852 with Joseph Postlewaite a composer of African-American descent. 1859 Balmer was among the founders of the St. Louis Philharmonic Orchestra which he also conducted several times.

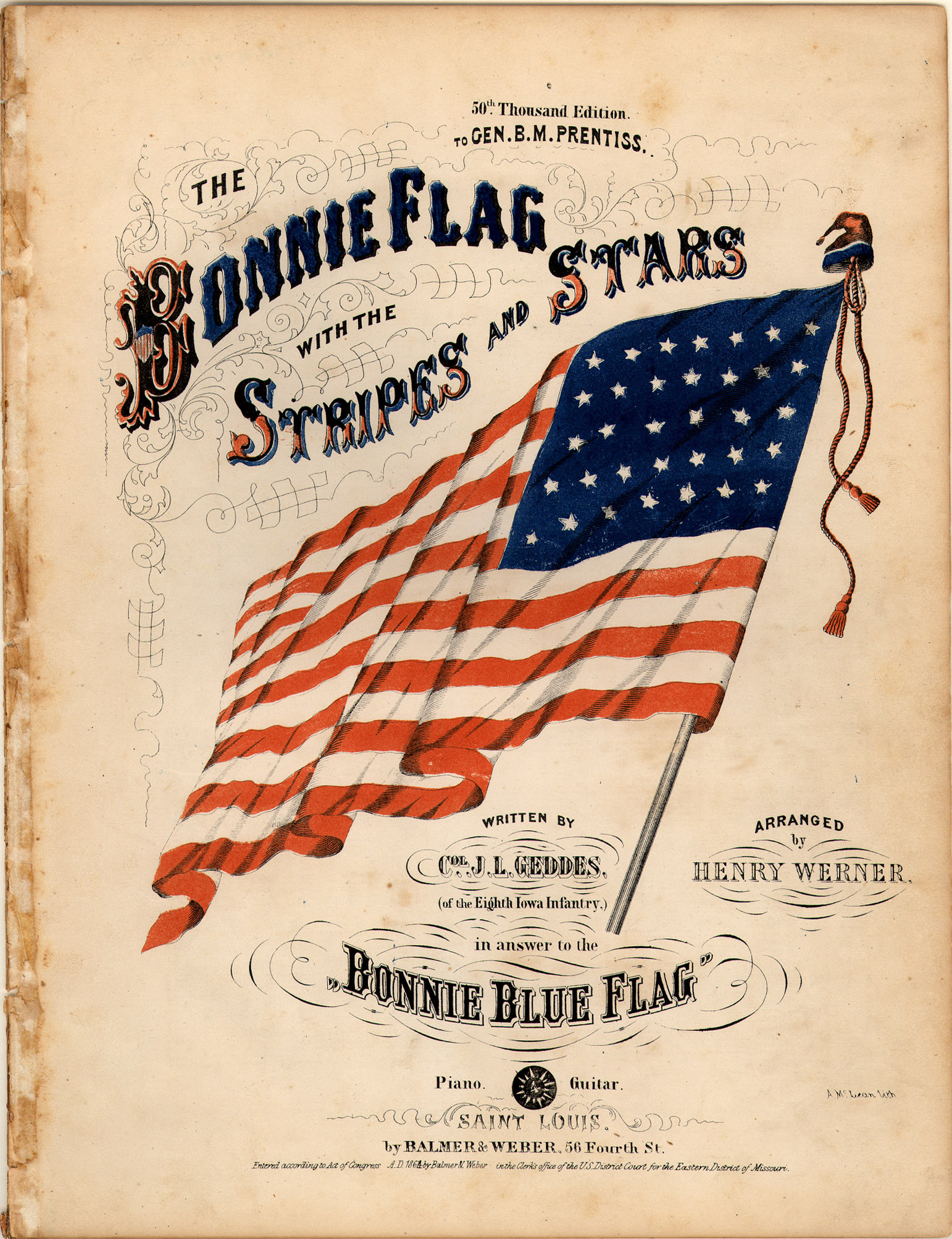
Title page of a song supporting Unionists by Balmer (pseudonym Henry Werner)

Under the pseudonym Henry Werner, he published various compositions from the beginning of the American Civil War in support of the Unionists fighting against slavery. In 1864, he conducted a benefit performance of Friedrich von Flotow's opera Martha in St. Louis to raise funds for sick and wounded soldiers. Balmer was appointed conductor of the funeral music for the assassinated US President Abraham Lincoln. When Balmer died in 1892, The New York Times called him in its obituary of December 16, 1892, "the most prolific as well as one of the greatest of American composers". He is buried at Bellefontaine Cemetery, St Louis.

His daughter, the pianist Rosalie Ida Balmer-Smith (1849–1934), and his granddaughter, the pianist and composer Rosalie Balmer Smith Cale (1875–1958), were also known as musicians.

== Works ==
As a composer, Balmer created a large number of piano pieces, songs, organ works, and choral music. Several of his piano pieces are based on dances and marches whose titles reflect life in St. Louis, such as "Waiting for the Wagon" for guitar and voice, "Pacific Railroad Grand March" for piano, and "The Bonnie Flag with Stars and Stripes" for voice and piano.

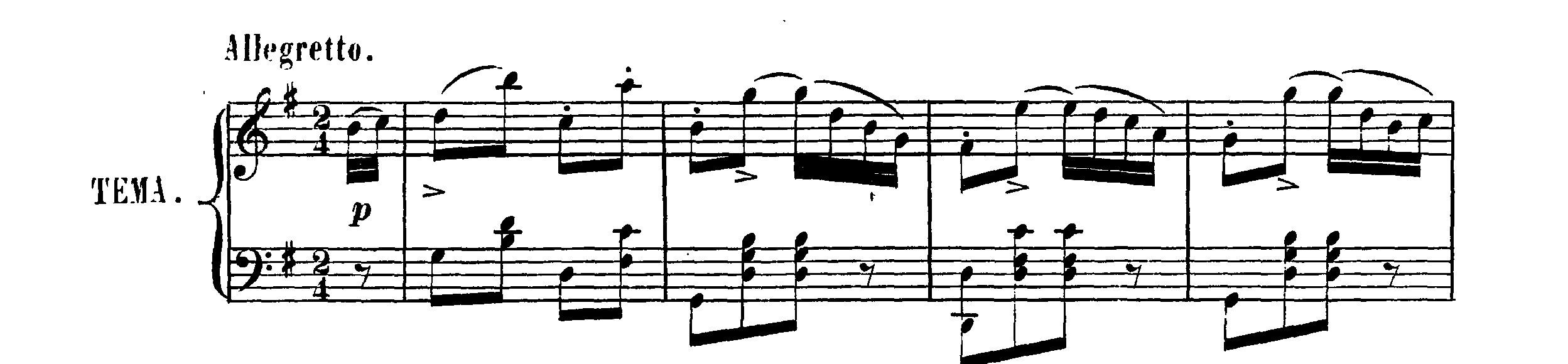
Theme of the Serenading Polka (1850) by Balmer

The musical work of Charles Balmer documents the transformation of a musical tradition handed down from Europe into an independent American musical practice in St. Louis. Dance-like syncopations and an accompaniment that at times resembled the style later known as Stride-piano, seems in part not so far from what Scott Joplin published in St. Louis in the last years of Balmer's life with his first ragtime compositions.
