= Joseph W. Postlewaite =

American music composer (1827–1889)

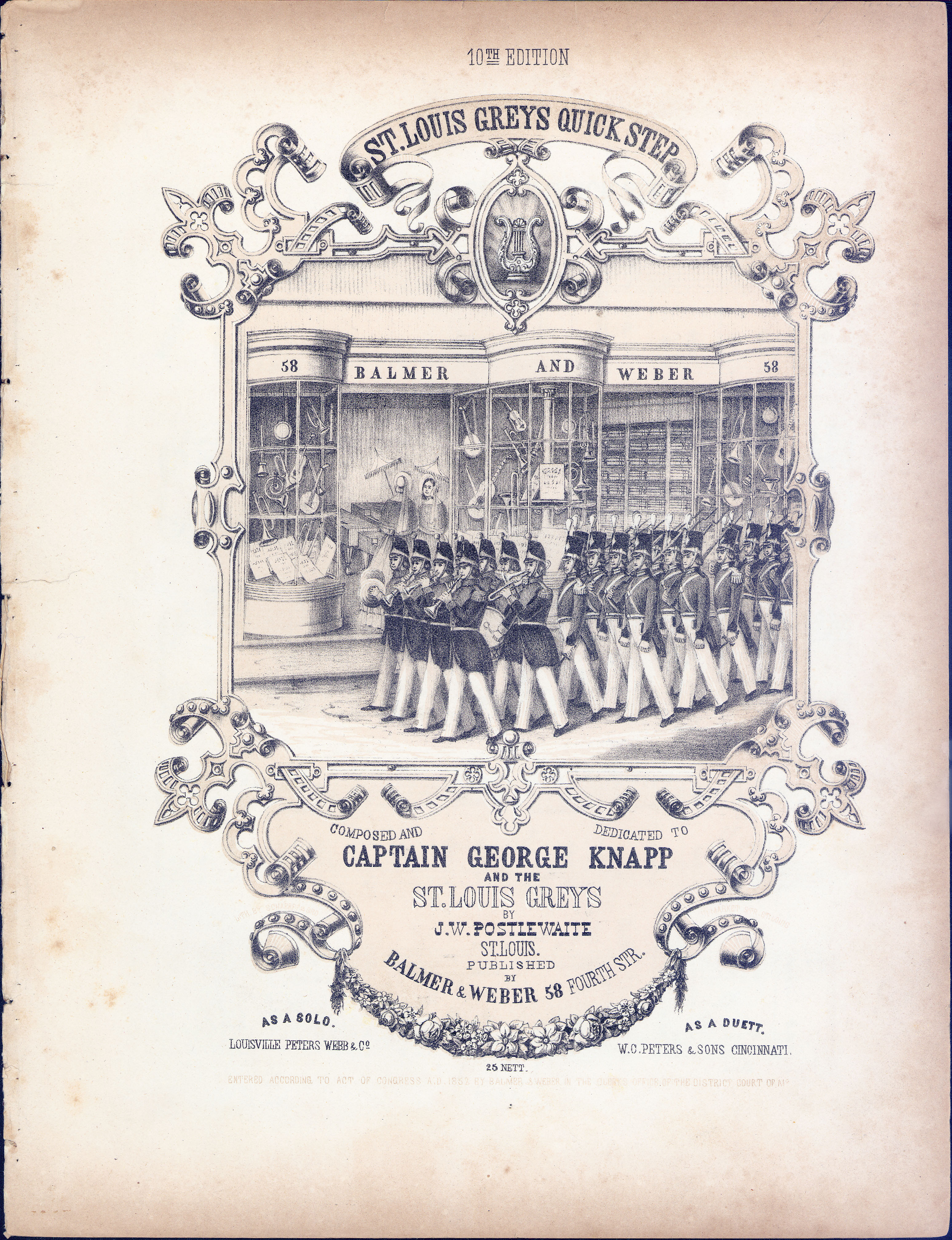
St. Louis Greys quick step

Joseph W. Postlewaite (1827–1889) was an American composer and organizer of bands and orchestras in the 1850s to 1880s.

== Early life ==
He was born in Missouri in 1827 and came to St. Louis, Missouri, in 1848. Joseph was the son of Phyllis Benito, alias Felicité Crevier and the cousin of Julia Clamorgan, with whom he boarded in St. Louis in 1880. Joseph was married to Eliza Lee, who he met on a trip to Cincinnati, Ohio. Her father worked on the river, as did Joseph for a brief period. Postlewaite's racial heritage has been debated. He was included in "A History of Negro Musicians" with a brief entry and no documentation of his racial identity. In the St. Louis Census of 1850, Postlewaite is listed as a twenty-three year old "mulatto." However, Postlewaite did apply for a freedom bond in 1850, which suggests his ethnicity was African-American.

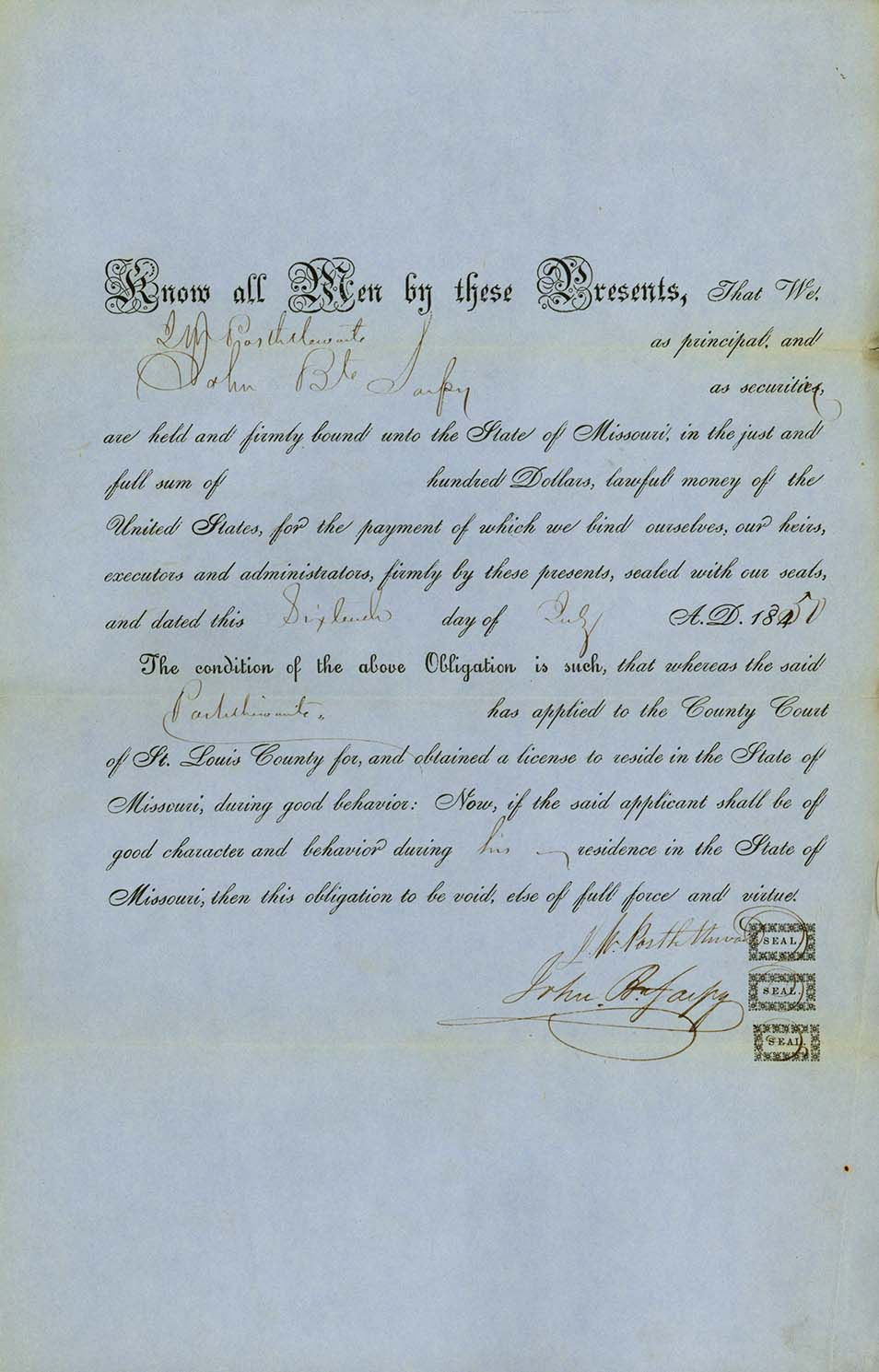
Free Negro Bond (front) for Postlewaite

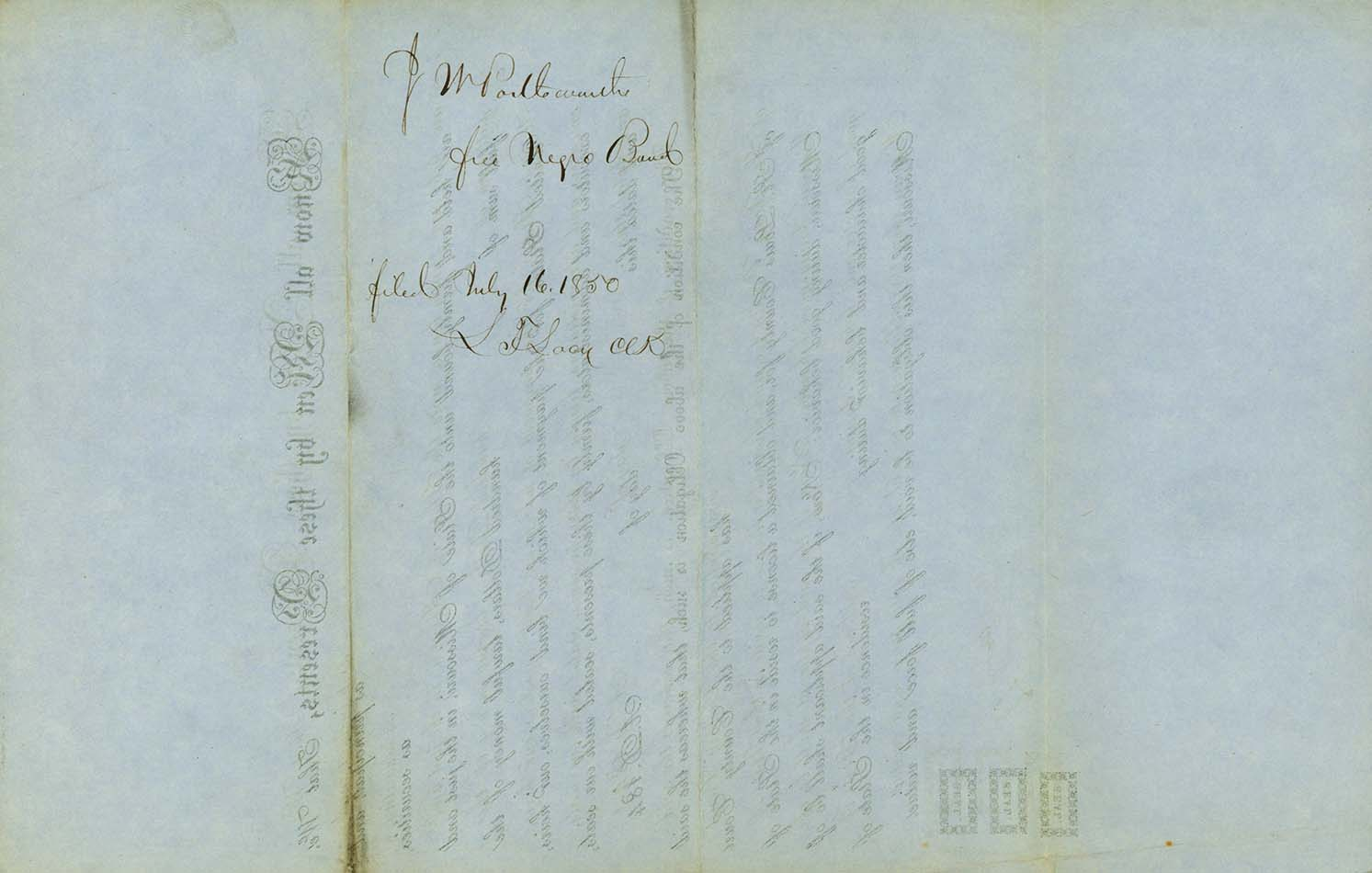
Free Negro Bond (back) for Postlewaite

Not much is known about Postlewaite's early life. When Postlewaite moved to St. Louis, Missouri was still a slave state, but slavery was declining in the city at that time. From 1850 to 1860, the overall population of St. Louis doubled in size, but the number of slaves decreased by almost half. The labor pool in St. Louis expanded with the arrival of European immigrants, and the need for slaves diminished. This affected free blacks as well, deteriorating their economic position. At that time, all "free colored" were required to post bond for a license to live in the state of Missouri. When Postlewaite arrived in St. Louis, at age twenty-one, as a free man, he applied for this bond. John B. Sarpy, a wealthy fur-trade executive signed the bond, though Postlewaite's relation with Sarpy's family is unknown. Postlewaite's bond is notable because most individuals signed their bonds with an X, but Postlewaite signed his bond himself, and with the signature of a cultured individual. Missouri was fairly lenient with regard to the education of black residents, a rarity for a slave state. The availability of limited education for black residents, along with the tradition of black musicians performing for white audiences allowed Postlewaite to achieve success as a black musician during this time.

== Musical career ==
Postlewaite's first composition, "Concert Hall Grand Waltz", was probably published in 1845, when he was just 18. Charles Balmer published Postlewaite's first composition.

Between 1845 and 1864, Postlewaite had at least fifteen compositions published. In addition to his musical career, Postlewaite held other positions during this time. He owned a coffee house in 1857, operated a publishing firm in 1858, and ran what was likely a booking agency in 1859. Though he had a publishing firm for a short time, many of Postlewaite's composition were published by another firm, Balmer & Weber. The sheet music from several of Postlewaite's compositions is available here.

Between 1860 and 1869, Postlewaite only published one piece, "Lillie Polka Mazurka" (Compton and Doan, 1867), although it is possible some of his undated compositions were also written during this time. From 1870 to 1889, however, Postlewaite published or republished probably seventeen compositions. His last composition was published in 1880, "The Veiled Prophets Grand March", which was written for and performed at that year's Veiled Prophet Ball. Over the span of his career, Postlewaite formed several bands, including Postlewaite's Quadrille Band (1857), Postlewaite's Cotillion Band (n.d.), Postlewaite's Four-Man Band (1862), Postlewaite's Orchestra (1873), The National Band (1873), the St. Louis Great Western Band (1874), and the Great Western Reed and String Band (1875). In 1880, Postlewaite lead a sixteen-piece Brass Band, which performed in parades. His other bands performed at various social functions, playing music for popular dances of the time.

Postlewaite was commissioned to write music for many occasions and became very well known in the area. Patrons and fellow performers thought that Postlewaite was white, and he never corrected this assumption. He wrote at least thirty-seven pieces, all of which were typical for secular dance music of nineteenth-century white society. Although he played at functions for St. Louis' white society, Postlewaite likely also played for St. Louis' large population of free black residents. Slaves in the St. Louis area put on dances that imitated dances held by white society and free black residents called "slave balls." Though Postlewaite and his music became very popular, his social status was below both St. Louis' middle-class white and middle-class black residents. Despite his social standing, Postlewaite was evidently held in high enough esteem, and his musical abilities respected enough to be included as a composer and performer at the Veiled Prophet's Ball in 1880, an elite affair for those in the upper echelons of St. Louis society.

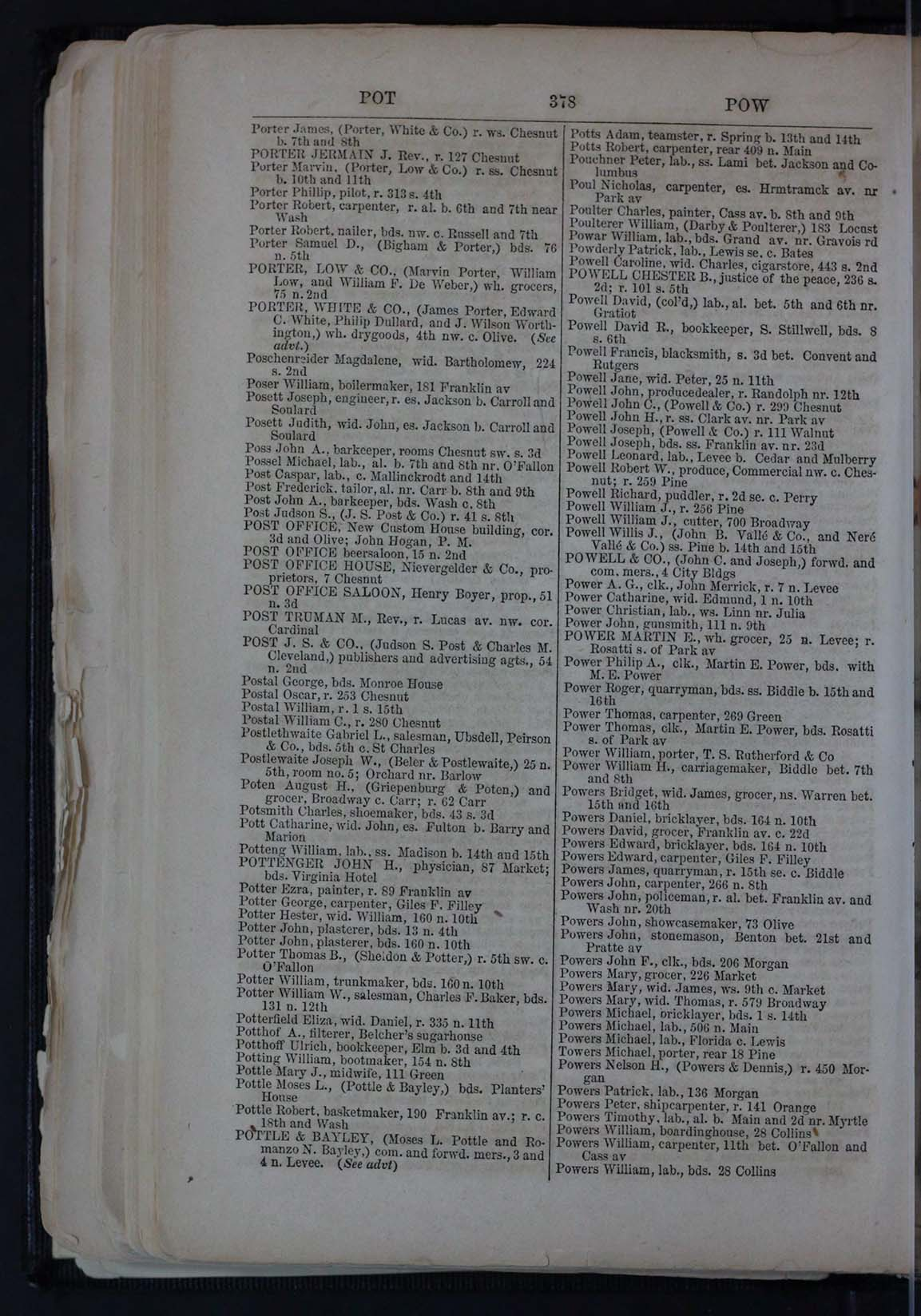
City directory entry for Joseph W. Postlewaite, 1859

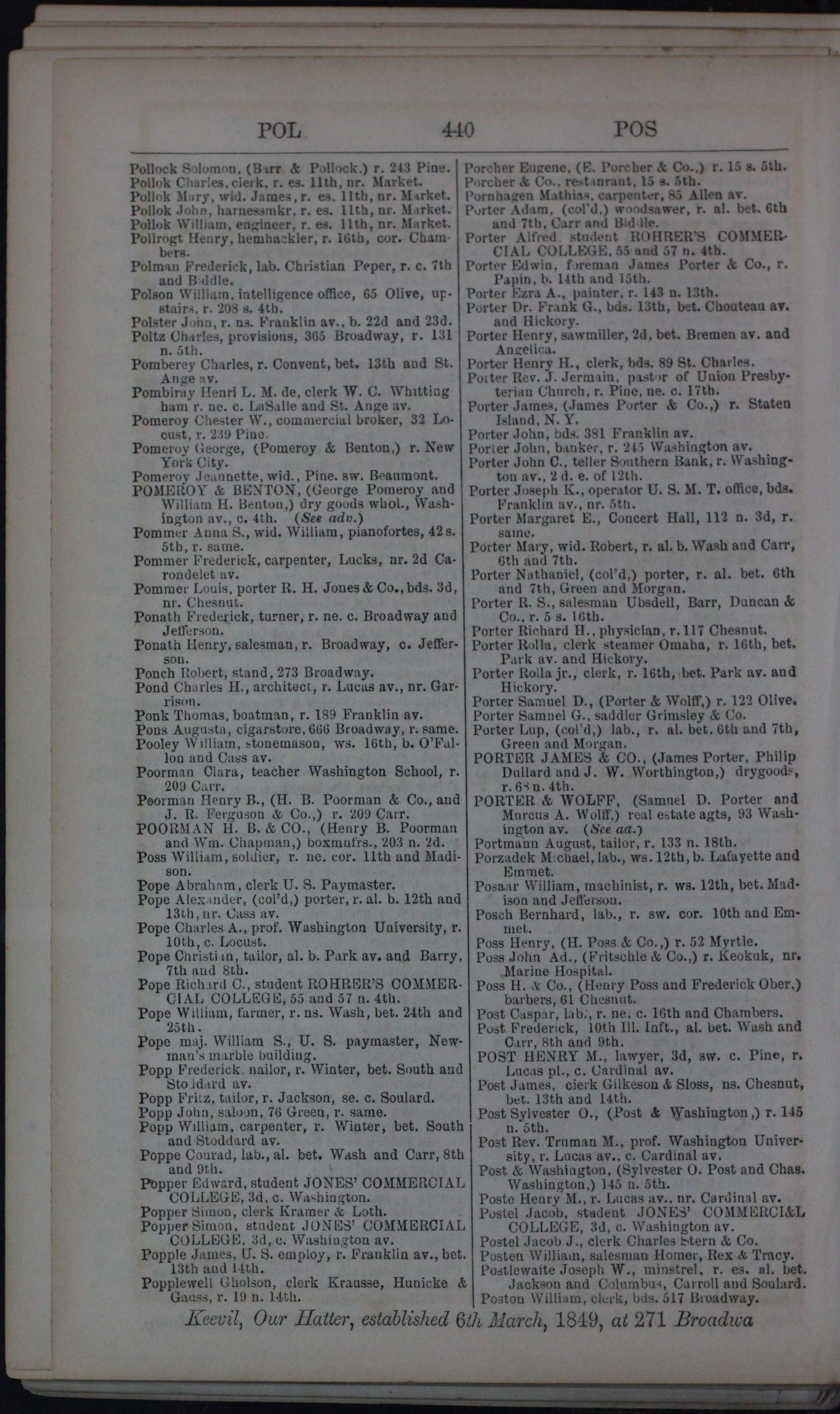
City directory entry for Joseph W. Postlewaite, 1864.

In 1860, Missouri supposedly expelled all free black residents. However, Postlewaite may have remained in St. Louis because of Missouri's lax enforcement of these laws. There are no St. Louis city directories for 1861–63, so it is not possible to verify this information. Postlewaite does appear in city directory listings published before the Civil War and before the end of the war, in the 1864 directory.

Postlewaite spent time on the road with his band and it was later revealed that he had established a separate household with another woman and child.

== Personal life ==
Joseph was married to Eliza Postlewaite, but upon his death, another woman came forward claiming to be Joseph's wife. Annie Papin was the daughter of Joseph L. Papin. She was also related to the Chouteaus, the founding family of St. Louis. Annie said that she was Joseph's legal wife, but had been separated for some time. Annie was also known as Annie Jones, having taken her mother's maiden name after her parents divorced. Annie said that she and Joseph had been married on May 5, 1871, by Justice Young. They lived in Laclede, Missouri just outside of St. Louis. People who knew the couple in Laclede said that Joseph acknowledged Annie as his wife, as well as two children as his own. Annie appeared on the Postlewaite's doorstep after reading of Joseph's death in the newspaper. She had two young children with her and said she had brought them to pay respects to their father.

The woman living with Joseph at the time of his death was unknown to Annie. This woman was Eliza Lee, the daughter of Henry Lee. Eliza claimed to have married Joseph in Cincinnati. Eliza was mulatto and did not know that Joseph was not white. It is believed that Joseph's mother, Phyllis Cravler was a mulatto and his father was white. Because Annie was African-American and could not produce a marriage certificate, Eliza had a stronger claim on the marriage due to her race. Justice John Young also denies ever having married Joseph to anyone and said he was not a Justice of the Peace in 1871.

== Later life and death ==
Joseph Postlewaite died on New Year's Day 1889 after being ill for some time. His wife, Eliza, nursed him around the clock. Joseph was buried in Calvary Cemetery on January 3, 1889.

== Music ==
=== Style and influences ===
Postlewaite composed waltzes, mazurkas, schottisches, quadrilles, marches, and quick steps, the "typical popular genres of the nineteenth century." These genres comprise common social dance music that was imported into the United States during the eighteenth and nineteenth centuries. Postlewaite was familiar with compositional practices of these Euro-American dance genres, as well as those of dance and folk tunes of the African American community.

His compositions, with respect to formal structure and harmonic structure, often reflect the Euro-American dance forms, being often in Minuet-trio form, Rondo, or a Ternary form, often deploying five basic chords (tonic, dominant, supertonic, subdominant, leading tone) Some of his pieces, however, fuse the large-scale structure of Euro-American social dance music with folksong tunes. Folksong-inspired pieces often consist of a four-measure introduction followed by five sixteen-measure sections that are each repeated, but are not organized according to a particular tonal plan aside from keys related by intervals of a fourth (e.g. C-G-C-F-F in Joplin's "Strenuous Life") and utilize folk/dance tunes popular in African American communities. By comparison, Euro-American social dance music is designed around eight- or sixteen-measure sections that are repeated, according to closely related keys (i.e. tonic, dominant, subdominant). In Postlewaite's "St. Louis Grey's Quick Step", for example, the large-scale form of the work is the minuet-trio, consisting of three four-measure introductions followed by six sixteen-measure sections. The key centers for these sections are C-C-F-?-C-C.

=== Works ===
Composition number	Title	Date published	Genre
1	Concert Hall Grand Waltz	(1845)	Waltz
2	Almira Waltz	1849	Waltz
3	Galena Waltz	1850	Waltz
4	Iola Waltz	1850	Waltz
5	Kasky Waltz	1850	Waltz
6	Dew Drop Schottisch	1851	Schottish
7	Eugenia Waltz	1852	Waltz
8	St. Louis Grey's Quick Step	(1852)	Quick Step
9	Schottisch Quadrille	1853	Quadrille
10	Annie Polka Mazurka	1854	Polka/Mazurka
11	Recreation Schottisch	1854	Schottisch
12	Geraldine's Dream	(1854)	
13	Bessee Waltz	1855	Waltz
14	St. Louis National Guard's Quick Step	1855	Quick Step
15	Dramatic Schottisch	1856	Schottisch
16	Red Petticoat Mazurka	1858	Mazurka
17	Vis-à-Vis Schottisch	Pre-1859	Schottisch
18	Pleyade Schottisch	1859	Schottisch
19	Lillie Polka Mazurka	1867	Polka/Mazurka
20	Bessie Waltz	Pre-1870	Waltz
21	Enchanting Mazurka	Pre-1870	Mazurka
22	Fairest of the Fair	Pre-1870	
23	Fairest of the Fair Polka Redowa	Pre-1870	Polka/Redowa
24	General Grey's Quick March	Pre-1870	March
25	Home Circle Lancers	Pre-1870	
26	Lewellyn Waltz	Pre-1870	Waltz
27	Orange Schottisch	Pre-1870	Schottisch
28	Point Breeze	Pre-1870	
29	Ruth Polka	Pre-1870	Polka
30	Evangeline Waltz	Post-1870	Mazurka
31	Governor Hendrick's Quick Step	Post-1870	Quick Step
32	Aurora Schottisch	Post-1870	Schottisch
33	Eliza	Post-1870	
34	Knight Templar Quick March	Post-1870	March
35	Love's Dream Waltz	1874	Waltz
36	Veiled Prophet's Grand March	1880	Waltz

NOTE: The dates in parentheses have been inferred from a combination of plate numbers and rear-cover catalogue listings.
