= Unitarian Church of the Messiah =

- Formerly listed on the U.S. National Register of Historic Places
- St. Louis Landmark
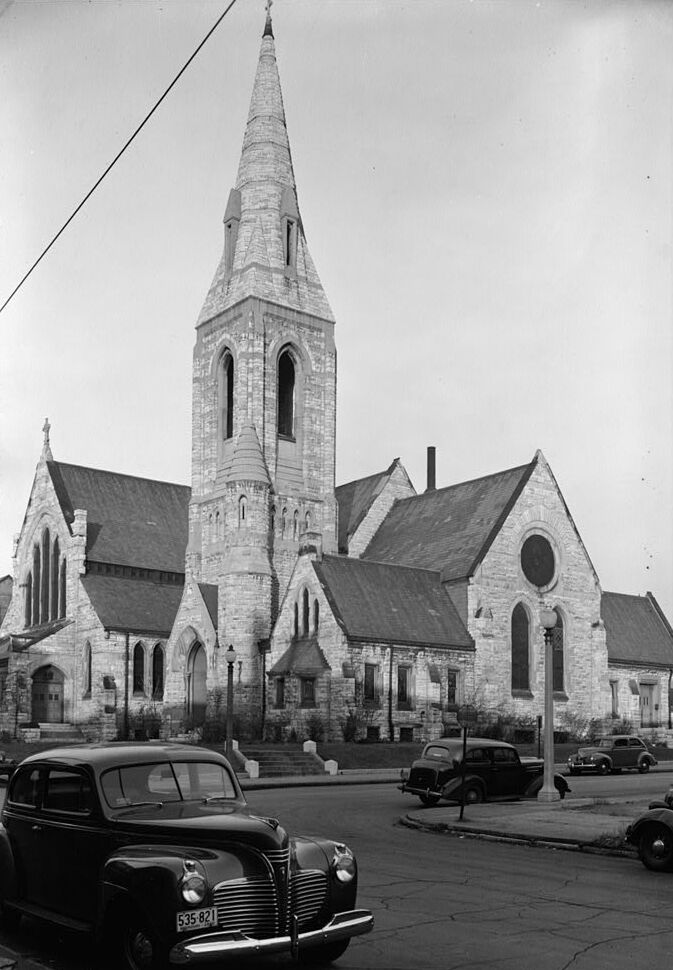
- Unitarian Church of the Messiah,1940.

- Location within St. Louis Location within Missouri Location within the United States
- Location: Locust and Garrison Sts., St. Louis, Missouri
- Coordinates: 38°38′9″N 90°13′17″W
- Area: 0.7 acres (0.28 ha)
- Built: 1880
- Architect: Peabody & Stearns
- Architectural style: Late Victorian
- Demolished: 1987
- NRHP reference No.: 80004513

Significant dates
- Added to NRHP: September 22, 1980
- Removed from NRHP: December 19, 1994

The Unitarian Church of the Messiah was a church at 508 North Garrison Avenue at the corner of Locust and Garrison Sts. in St. Louis, Missouri, USA and was the third church of the St. Louis congregation of Unitarians, founded in 1835. It was designed by noted Boston-based architects Peabody & Stearns in the Late Victorian style and constructed in 1880 by Charles Everett Clark, one of Peabody & Stearns' longtime contractors. The exterior walls were constructed of locally quarried blue limestone with a tawny colored sandstone quarried from Warrensburg, Missouri. The interior walls were faced with buff brick from the Peerless Brick Company of Philadelphia, among other materials. The original roof was made of red slate.

The congregation's first pastor William Greenleaf Eliot initially proposed its construction in January 1877 and commissioned Peabody & Stearns in 1878. The congregation purchased the plot of land in 1879. Ground was broken in November 1879, and the cornerstone laid February 1, 1880. The first service was held on December 26, 1880 with the official dedication on December 16, 1881.

It was designated a St. Louis City Landmark in 1977 and listed on the National Register of Historic Places in 1980. A fire in January 1982 caused by squatters living in a basement storage room gutted the structure, leading to its eventual demolition in 1987. Because of its demolition, it was removed from the National Register in 1994.

Ernst R. Kroeger served as organist at the church.

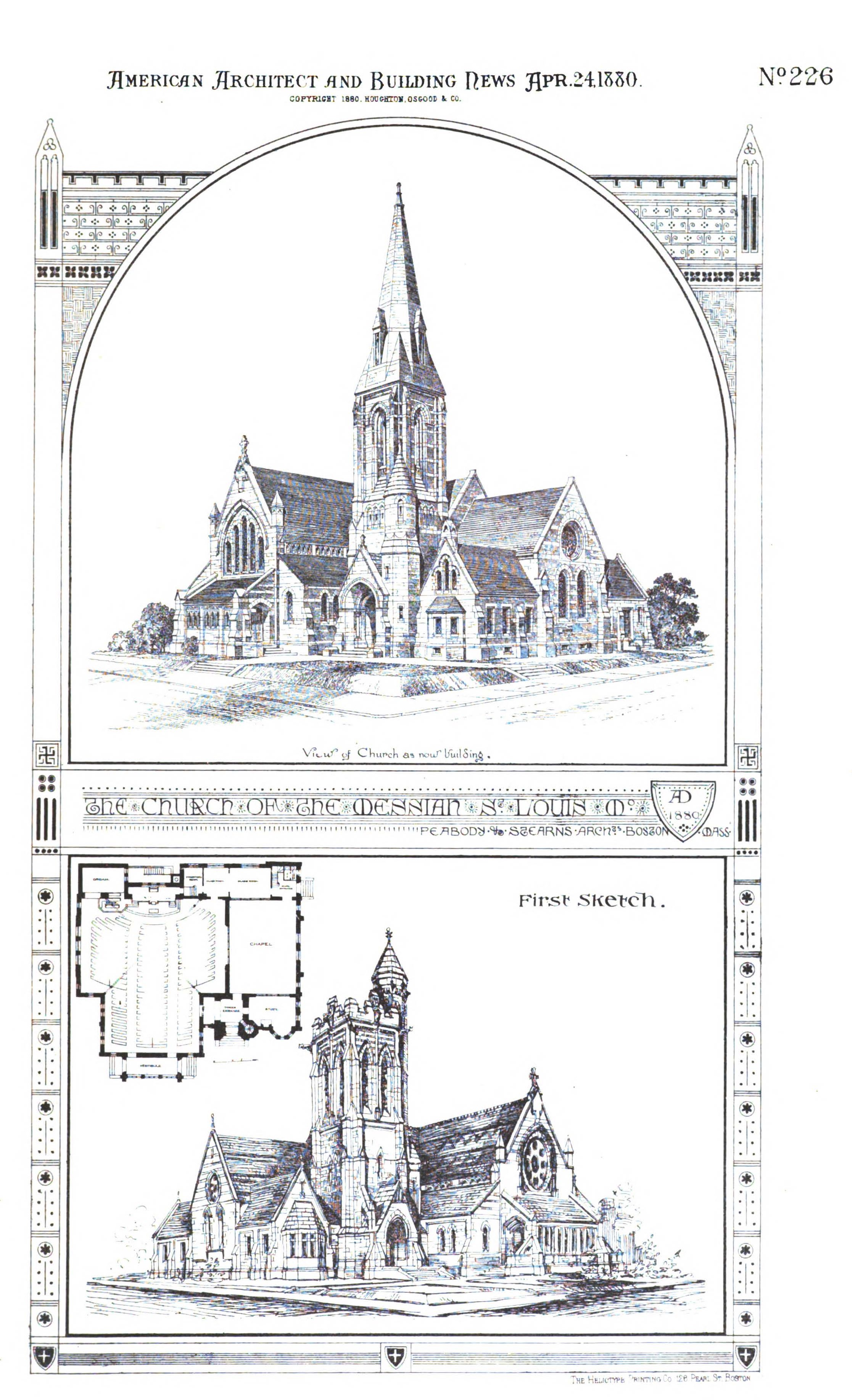
Sketches of the Unitarian Church of the Messiah in St. Louis, Missouri by Peabody and Stearns
