= Adolph Ernst Kroeger =

German-born American translator

- Born: December 28, 1837; Schwabstedt, Duchy of Schleswig, Denmark
- Died: March 8, 1882 (aged 44); St. Louis, Missouri, U.S.
- Occupation: Translator

Adolph Ernst Kroeger (German: [ˈkʁøːɡɐ]; 28 December 1837 – 8 March 1882) was a German-born American translator and author who contributed significantly to the understanding of German literature in the United States.

== Biography ==
Kroeger was the son of a clergyman who emigrated to the United States with his family in 1848 and settled at Davenport, Iowa. He was a Latin farmer, and instructed his son in foreign languages and instilled in him a love for music, poetry and philosophy. Young Kroeger first went into a banking house. In 1857 his father died, and he moved to New York City and was connected with The New York Times as translator for three years. He became their St. Louis correspondent and was noted for his political articles. During the Civil War he served on the staff of Gen. Frémont.

At the close of the Civil War, he settled in St. Louis. He made his living as a journalist and dabbled in municipal politics, but philosophy was his life calling. Both by translations of the works of Fichte, Kant, and Leibniz, and by numerous essays in different periodicals, he largely contributed to a better understanding of German literature in the United States, and increased the number of those that are interested in it. He wrote regularly for the St. Louis Journal of Speculative Philosophy. He published Fichte's Science of Knowledge (Philadelphia, 1868), the same author's Science of Rights (1869), and translated his Science of Morals, though at his death the latter remained in manuscript. He also issued The Minnesingers of Germany, containing translations of Walter von der Vogelweide and others (New York, 1873), and Our Forms of Government and the Problems of the Future (1862).

An 1870 incident involving St. Louis finances and the city treasurer resulted in him being convicted for forgery and sentenced to a term in prison. There were mitigating circumstances, and Governor Gratz Brown pardoned him in 1872.
