= SS Verona (1908) =

Transatlantic ocean liner

History

Italy
- Name: Verona
- Namesake: Verona
- Owner: 1908: Italia Soc di Nav a Vap; 1913: Nav Gen Italiana
- Port of registry: Genoa
- Route: 1908: Genoa – Naples – New York – Philadelphia; 1913: Genoa – Naples – Palermo – New York
- Builder: Workman, Clark & Co, Belfast
- Yard number: 271
- Launched: 31 March 1908
- Completed: May 1908
- Maiden voyage: 19 June 1908
- Identification: Italian official number 388; code letters: SRCT; wireless telegraphy call sign: 1913: MOV; 1914: ITV
- Fate: Sunk, 11 May 1918

General characteristics
- Type: Ocean liner
- Tonnage: 8,261 GRT, 5,068 NRT
- Length: 482.3 ft (147.0 m)
- Beam: 58.3 ft (17.8 m)
- Depth: 26.2 ft (8.0 m)
- Installed power: 1,221 NHP
- Propulsion: 2 × triple-expansion engines; 2 × screws
- Speed: 16 knots (30 km/h)
- Capacity: 1908: 60 first class, 2,500 third class
- Troops: 3,000
- Notes: sister ships: Taormina, Ancona

SS Verona was a transatlantic ocean liner that was built in Ireland in 1908 for an Italian shipping line. She was a troop ship in the Italo-Turkish War of 1911–12 and in the First World War in 1917–18. In 1918 a German submarine sank her in the Mediterranean with great loss of life.

== Building ==
In 1907 and 1908 shipyards in Scotland and Ireland built three sister ships for Italia Società di Navigazione a Vapore, also known as Italia Line. The first was Taormina, which D. and W. Henderson and Company in Glasgow launched on 15 February 1907 and completed in 1908.

Workman, Clark and Company in Belfast built the second and third sisters, Ancona and Verona. Ancona was launched on 19 December 1907 and completed in February 1908. Verona was launched on 31 March 1908 and completed that May.

Verona's registered length was 482.3 ft (147.0 m), her beam was 58.3 ft (17.8 m) and her depth was 26.2 ft (8.0 m). She had berths for 60 first class and 2,500 third class passengers. Her tonnages were 8,261 GRT and 5,068 NRT. She had twin screws, each driven by a three-cylinder triple-expansion engine. The combined power of the two engines was rated at 1,221 NHP and gave her a speed of 16 knots (30 km/h).

Verona was registered in Genoa. Her code letters were SRCT and her Italian official number was 388.

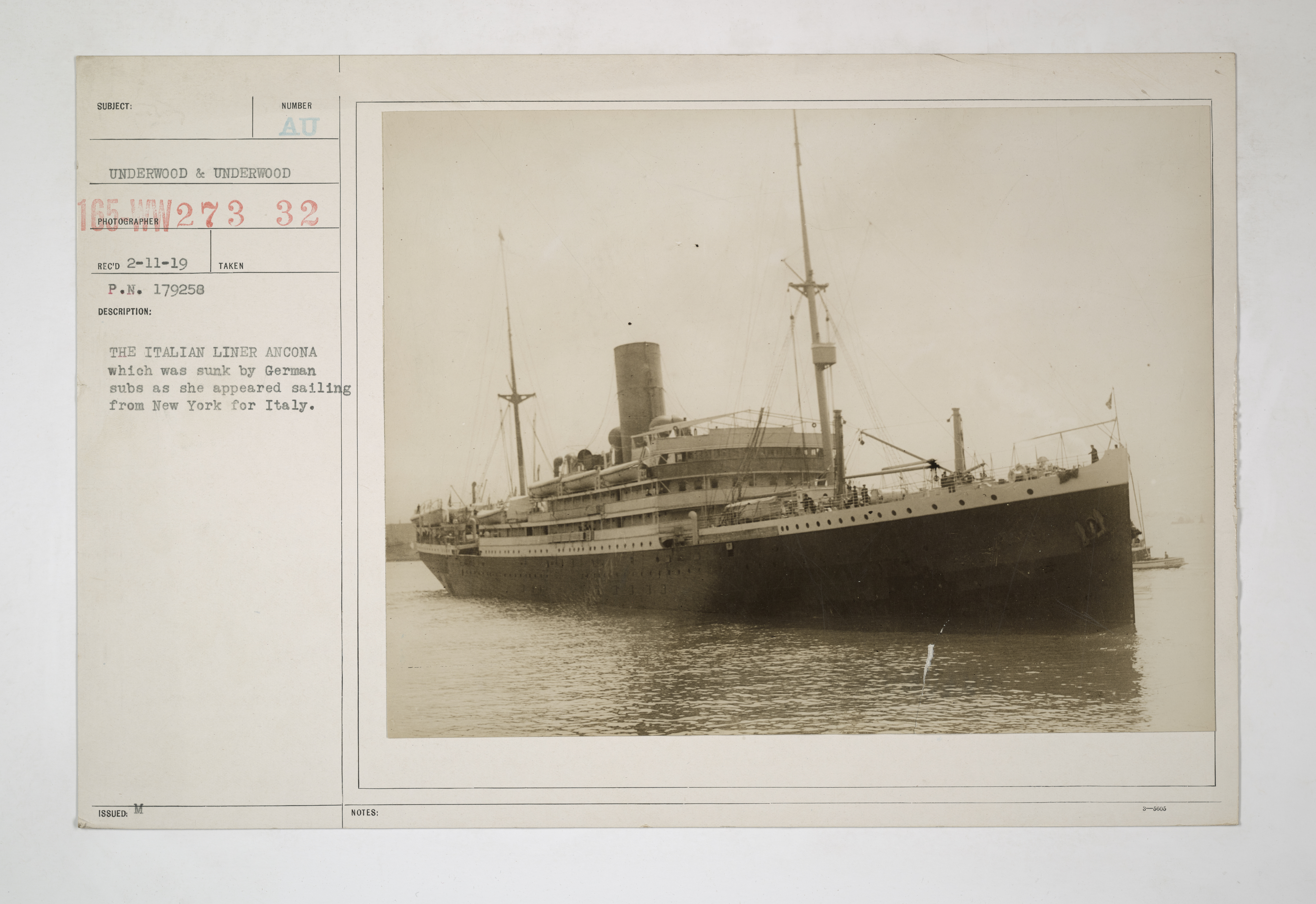
Verona's sister ship Ancona

== Service ==
On 19 June 1908 Verona began her maiden voyage from Genoa to Philadelphia via Naples and New York. In 1909 berths for 120 first class passengers were added. In August 1910 she was refitted to carry 60 first class and 120 second class passengers, plus migrants. On 25 August 1911 she left Genoa on her last transatlantic crossing for Italia Line. Thereafter the Italian government took her over as a troop ship for the Italo-Turkish War.

In 1913 Navigazione Generale Italiana (NGI) bought Verona. By then she was equipped for wireless telegraphy. Her call sign was originally MOV, but in 1914 it was changed to ITV.

NGI put her on a route between Genoa and New York via Naples and Palermo. She began her first voyage on the route from Genoa on 9 March 1913. She began her final civilian voyage from Genoa four years later on 4 March 1917. Thereafter the Italian government took her over as a troop ship for the First World War.

== Loss ==
In May 1918 Verona left Genoa bound for Tripoli in Libya. She was carrying about 3,000 troops, most of whom were deserters being sent to a detention camp. On 11 May she called at Messina, and then a few miles out of port SM UC-52 torpedoed her. Verona sank within 25 minutes, with the loss of about 880 lives.

== Bibliography ==
- Anon (1914). Lloyd's Register of Shipping. Vol. I. London: Lloyd's Register of Shipping.
- The Marconi Press Agency Ltd (1913). The Year Book of Wireless Telegraphy and Telephony. London: The St Katherine Press.
- The Marconi Press Agency Ltd (1914). The Year Book of Wireless Telegraphy and Telephony. London: The Marconi Press Agency Ltd.
