= SS Ancona =

Italian passenger steamer

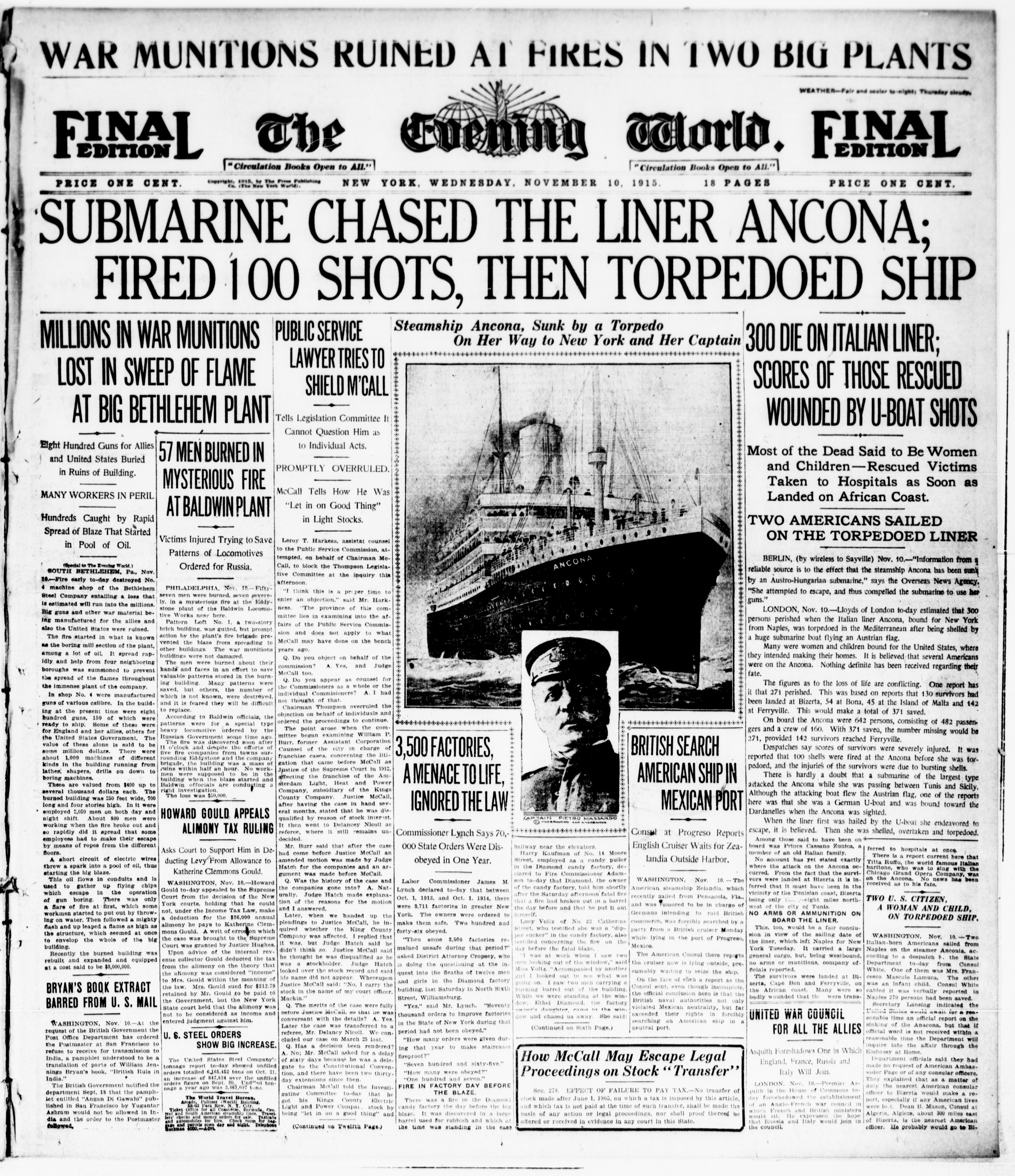
- Front page of The Evening World. 10 November 1915

History

Italy
- Name: Ancona
- Namesake: Ancona
- Owner: Italia Società di Navigazione a Vapore
- Port of registry: Genoa
- Route: Genoa – Naples – New York – Philadelphia
- Builder: Workman, Clark & Co, Belfast
- Yard number: 270
- Launched: 19 December 1907
- Sponsored by: Violet Ardill
- Completed: February 1908
- Maiden voyage: 26 March 1908
- Identification: Italian official number 371; code letters NCRM; wireless telegraphy call sign: 1913: MOA; 1914: ITA
- Fate: Sunk by torpedo, 8 November 1915

General characteristics
- Type: Ocean liner
- Tonnage: 1908: 8,885 GRT, 6,020 NRT; 1911: 8,210 GRT, 5,034 NRT
- Length: 482.3 ft (147.0 m)
- Beam: 58.3 ft (17.8 m)
- Depth: 26.2 ft (8.0 m)
- Installed power: 1,221 nhp
- Propulsion: 2 × triple-expansion engines; 2 × screws
- Speed: 17 knots (31 km/h)
- Capacity: 1908: 60 first class, 2,500 third class
- Notes: sister ships: Taormina, Verona

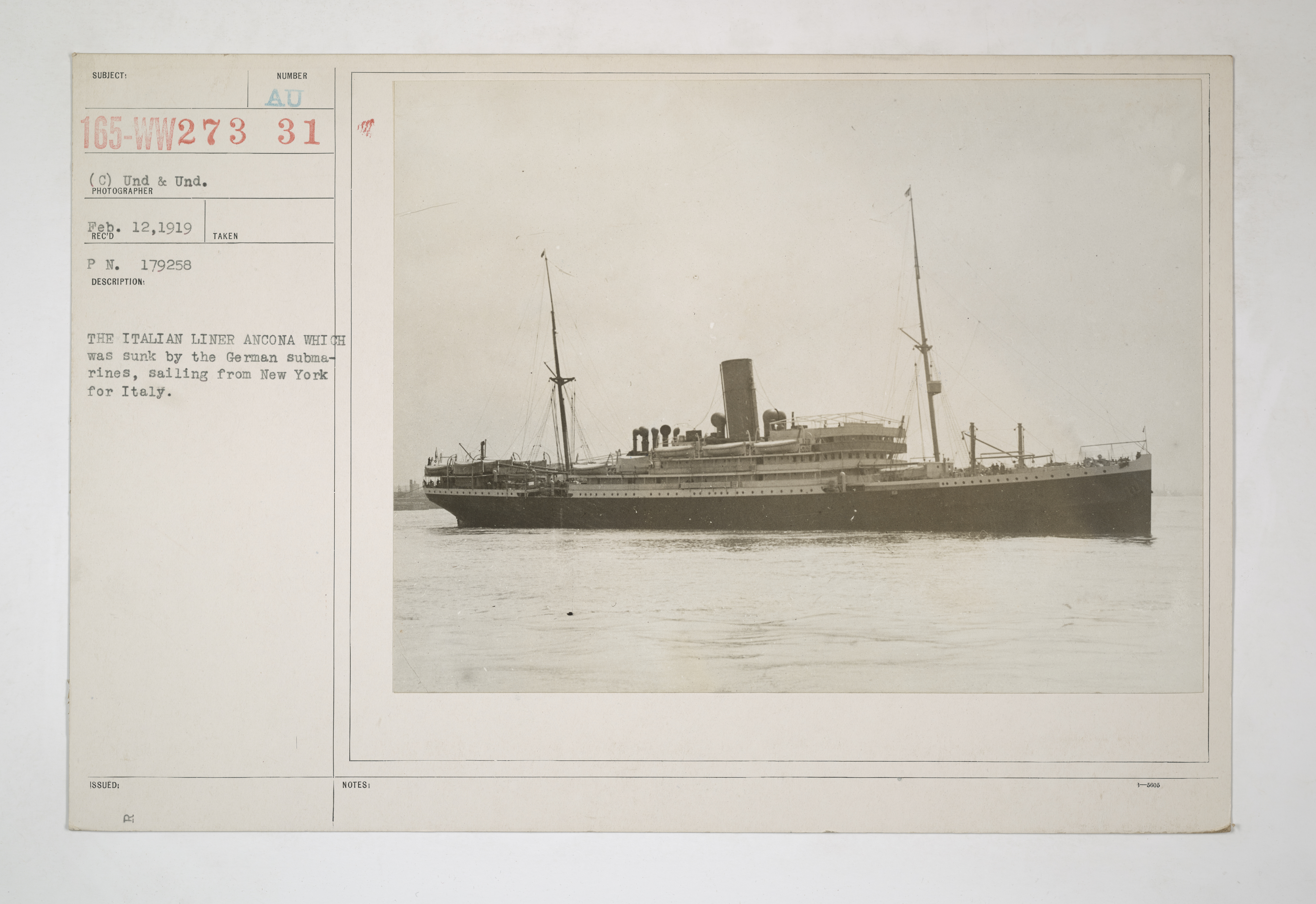
Ancona sailing from New York for Italy

SS Ancona was an ocean liner, built in 1908 by Workman, Clark and Company of Belfast for the Societa di Navigazione a Vapore Italia of Genoa. She was an emigrant ship on a route between Italy and the United States. SM U-38 sank her on 8 November 1915 off the coast of Tunisia.

== Design and construction ==
In 1907 and 1908 shipyards in Scotland and Ireland built three sister ships for the Italia Società di Navigazione a Vapore's route between Genoa and Philadelphia via Naples and New York. The first was Taormina, which D. and W. Henderson and Company in Glasgow launched on 15 February 1907 and completed in 1908.

Workman, Clark and Company in Belfast built the second and third sisters, Ancona and Verona. Ancona was launched on 19 December 1907, with Miss Violet Ardill of Greystones as her sponsor on behalf of the Duke of Andría. She was completed in February 1908. Verona was launched on 31 March 1908 and completed that May. After successful sea trials, Ancona was commissioned in February 1908.

As built, she had accommodation for about 60 passengers in first class state rooms in her promenade deck-house, and about 2,500 passengers in third class. To feed so many passengers, the space on her orlop deck was insulated and supplied with an acidic refrigeration system. In 1909 accommodation for first class passengers was expanded to 120. In September 1910 she was refitted to carry 60 first and 120 second class passengers.

Ancona's registered length was 482.3 feet (147.0 m), her beam was 58.3 feet (17.8 m) and her depth was 26.2 feet (8.0 m). As built, her tonnages were 8,885 GRT and 6,020 NRT. After refitting, she was reassessed as 8,210 GRT and 5,034 NRT. She had a steel hull, and two triple-expansion steam engines rated at a combined 1,221 nhp. They had cylinders of 26-inch (66 cm), 43-inch (110 cm), and 71-inch (180 cm) diameter with a 48-inch (120 cm) stroke that drove two screw propellers, and gave her a speed of up to 17 knots (31 km/h).

On 28 February 1908, after successful completion of her speed trials on the Skelmorlie measured mile, Ancona, while coming up the Lough on her return trip from the Clyde to Liverpool, hit in the stern and sank Harbour Commissioners' twin screw tug Musgrave.

== Operational history ==
Upon delivery Ancona sailed to Italy. She started her maiden voyage from Genoa on 26 March 1908 with 59 passengers in third class and 9 in first class and proceeded to Naples. After reaching Naples, the ship took 341 more passengers in third class and 23 in first class bringing the total number of people on board to 432. Ancona left Naples on 28 March and reached New York on 10 April. On her return journey on 23 April, Ancona boarded 910 people in New York and 1,343 in Philadelphia for a total of 2,253 passengers heading to Italy.

Ancona continued serving New York and Philadelphia from Italian ports of Genoa, Palermo and Naples throughout her career. Overall, she transported almost 100,000 people between the start of her service in 1908 and the outbreak of the World War I, most of them in third class.

By 1913 Ancona was equipped for wireless telegraphy. Her call sign was originally MOA, but in 1914 it was changed to ITA.

When World War I broke out in August 1914, Italy at first stayed neutral, but many Italians travelled from America back to their home country, many of them on Ancona. After Italy's entry into the war in May 1915, there was another surge in the number of Italians returning home to take part in the hostilities. Ancona started her final eastward transatlantic voyage from New York for Naples on 16 October 1915 carrying 1,245 Italian reservists and about 5,000 tons of general cargo, including flour, beef and other provisions.

== Sinking ==
Wreck location

In November 1915 the German submarine SM U-38, commanded by Kapitänleutnant Max Valentiner, was raiding Allied shipping under the Austro-Hungarian flag as the German Empire was not then at war with Italy.

Ancona had sailed from Naples for New York at 11.45 p.m. on Saturday, 6 November 1915, under command of Capt. Massardo. She called at Messina on Sunday and embarked 130 more passengers, leaving again at 5 p.m. with a total of 446 aboard, of whom 163 were crew. On Monday, 8 November, when Ancona was off Cape Carbonara, Sardinia U-38 sighted her at 38°14′N 10°08′E, gave chase and fired about 100 rounds at the liner. Later, at about 1 p.m., U-38 torpedoed Ancona. Her lifeboats were hurriedly launched, but as Ancona was still steaming slowly they capsized as soon as they reached the water. Several of Ancona's lifeboats were picked up by the French minelayer Pluton, which put out from Bizerte to assist.

The death-toll was heavy. Ancona was fully booked. According to Hocking, 194 people, of whom 11 were American citizens, were killed. In other versions as many as 300 (Note: Sources differ on how many were killed. Messimer claims that 300 total were killed as well as 20 Americans while The United States in the First World War: An Encyclopedia says that about 200 total were killed, of whom nine were American.) people died, including 20 Americans.

== Reactions to the sinking ==
Coming as it did six months after the sinking of the RMS Lusitania off Ireland, the Ancona sinking added to a growing outrage in the US over unrestricted submarine warfare, and US Secretary of State Robert Lansing sent a sternly-worded protest to Vienna. After some delay Austria admitted that its submarine commander exceeded his orders, but stated in extenuation of his action that he believed Ancona to have been a troopship. Austria admitted U-38 shelled Ancona, but claimed that only 16 rounds were fired, and not 100 as Italian sources claimed. The loss of life owing to the capsizing of the boats was due, not to any Austrian action, but because they were launched while the liner was under way.

After receiving no satisfactory response from Austro-Hungarian Foreign Minister Baron István Burián von Rajecz, in December 1915 the US demanded that the Habsburg government denounce the sinking and punish the U-boat commander responsible. Germany, then concerned to maintain American neutrality, advised Burián to accede to the US demands, and Vienna eventually agreed to pay an indemnity and assured Washington that the U-boat commander would be punished, although this was a meaningless promise since he was a German officer. After the settlement of the affair, the Austro-Hungarian government requested that German submarines refrain from attacking passenger vessels while flying the Austrian flag.

Burián's diplomatic accession to American demands angered Grand Admiral Anton Haus, commander of the Austro-Hungarian Navy, who had advocated taking a hard line after the sinking. Haus justified the sinking on the grounds that the Ancona could have been used on her return voyage from the US to transport armaments or Italian emigrants returning home to enlist in the Italian Army. Germany's decision in April 1916 to suspend unrestricted submarine warfare ended the debate.
