= SS Taormina (1908) =

Transatlantic ocean liner

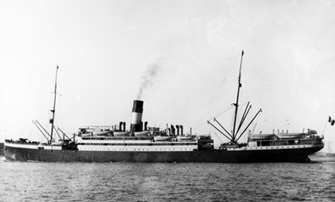
- Taormina

History

Italy
- Name: Taormina
- Namesake: Taormina, Sicily
- Owner: 1908–1912: Italia Soc di Nav a Vap; 1912–1918: Lloyd Italiano; 1918–1929: Nav Gen Italiana
- Port of registry: Genoa
- Route: 1908–1912: Genoa – New York – Philadelphia; 1912–1919: Genoa – Naples – New York; 1919–1923, 1927: Genoa – Marseille – New York
- Builder: D&W Henderson & Co, Glasgow
- Yard number: 462
- Launched: 15 February 1907
- Completed: 1908
- Maiden voyage: 3 September 1908
- Identification: Italian official number 386; code letters SLOB; wireless telegraphy call sign: 1913: MOT; 1914: IYT
- Fate: Scrapped 1929

General characteristics
- Type: Ocean liner
- Tonnage: 8,928 GRT, 5,106 NRT
- Length: 482.0 ft (146.9 m)
- Beam: 58.3 ft (17.8 m)
- Depth: 34.2 ft (10.4 m)
- Decks: 2
- Installed power: 1,178 NHP
- Propulsion: 2 × triple-expansion engines; 2 × screws
- Speed: 16 knots (30 km/h)
- Capacity: Passengers (1908): 60 first-class; 2,500 third class
- Troops: 2,680
- Notes: sister ships: Ancona, Verona

SS Taormina was a transatlantic ocean liner that was launched in Scotland in 1907 for an Italian shipping line. She was owned successively by Italia Società di Navigazione a Vapore (Italia Line), Lloyd Italiano and Navigazione Generale Italiana (NGI). Taormina was briefly chartered as a troop ship for the US Armed Forces in 1918. She was scrapped in 1929.

== Building ==
D. and W. Henderson and Company built Taormina in Glasgow for Italia Line, launching her on 15 February 1907 and completing her in 1908.

She was followed by two sister ships built by Workman, Clark and Company in Belfast: Ancona and Verona. Ancona was launched on 19 December 1907 and completed in February 1908. Verona was launched on 31 March 1908 and completed that May.

Taormina's registered length was 482.0 ft (146.9 m), her beam was 58.3 ft (17.8 m) and her depth was 34.2 ft (10.4 m). She had berths for 60 first class and 2,500 third class passengers. Her tonnages were 8,928 GRT and 5,106 NRT. She had twin screws, each driven by a three-cylinder triple-expansion engine. The combined power of the two engines was rated at 1,178 NHP and gave her a speed of 16 knots (30 km/h).

Taormina was registered in Genoa. Her code letters were SLOB and her Italian official number was 386.

== Service ==
On 3 September 1908 Taormina began her maiden voyage from Genoa to Philadelphia via Naples and New York. In 1909 berths for 120 first class passengers were added. In 1910 she was refitted to carry 60 first class and 120 second class passengers. On 16 December 1911 she left Genoa on her final transatlantic crossing for Italia Line.

In 1912 Lloyd Italiano took over Taormina and put her on a route between Genoa and New York Via Naples. By 1913 she was equipped for wireless telegraphy. Her call sign was originally MOT, but in 1914 it was changed to IYT.

In 1918 the US Government chartered Taormina as a troop ship. She embarked 2,680 officers and men and left the United States on 26 July in convoy with the US Navy troop ships Finland and Kroonland. The convoy met the US Navy troop ships Pocahontas and Susquehanna, and the Italian liners Duca d'Aosta and Caserta from Newport News, Virginia. The US Navy cruisers Pueblo and Huntington and destroyers Rathburne and Colhoun escorted the combined convoy. The convoy reached Brest, France on 7 August. Taormina arrived back in the United States on 20 August, ending her sole US troop ship voyage.

In 1918 Taormina came under the control of NGI. In 1919 NGI put her on a route between Genoa and New York via Marseille. NGI laid her up for four years from August 1923 to 1927, when she made one last round trip to New York and back. She was scrapped at Savona from 27 July 1929.

== Notable Travelers ==
Vito Genovese, boss of the Genovese Crime Family, emigrated from Naples, Italy to New York on board the SS Taormina. They arrived on May 23, 1913.

== Bibliography ==
- Anon (1914). Lloyd's Register of Shipping. Vol. I. London: Lloyd's Register of Shipping.
- Crowell, Benedict; Wilson, Robert Forrest (1921). The Road to France: The Transportation of Troops and Military Supplies, 1917–1918. How America Went to War: An Account From Official Sources of the Nation's War Activities, 1917–1920. New Haven: Yale University Press. OCLC 18696066 – via Internet Archive.
- The Marconi Press Agency Ltd (1913). The Year Book of Wireless Telegraphy and Telephony. London: The St Katherine Press.
- The Marconi Press Agency Ltd (1914). The Year Book of Wireless Telegraphy and Telephony. London: The Marconi Press Agency Ltd.
