= Punta Vagno Lighthouse =

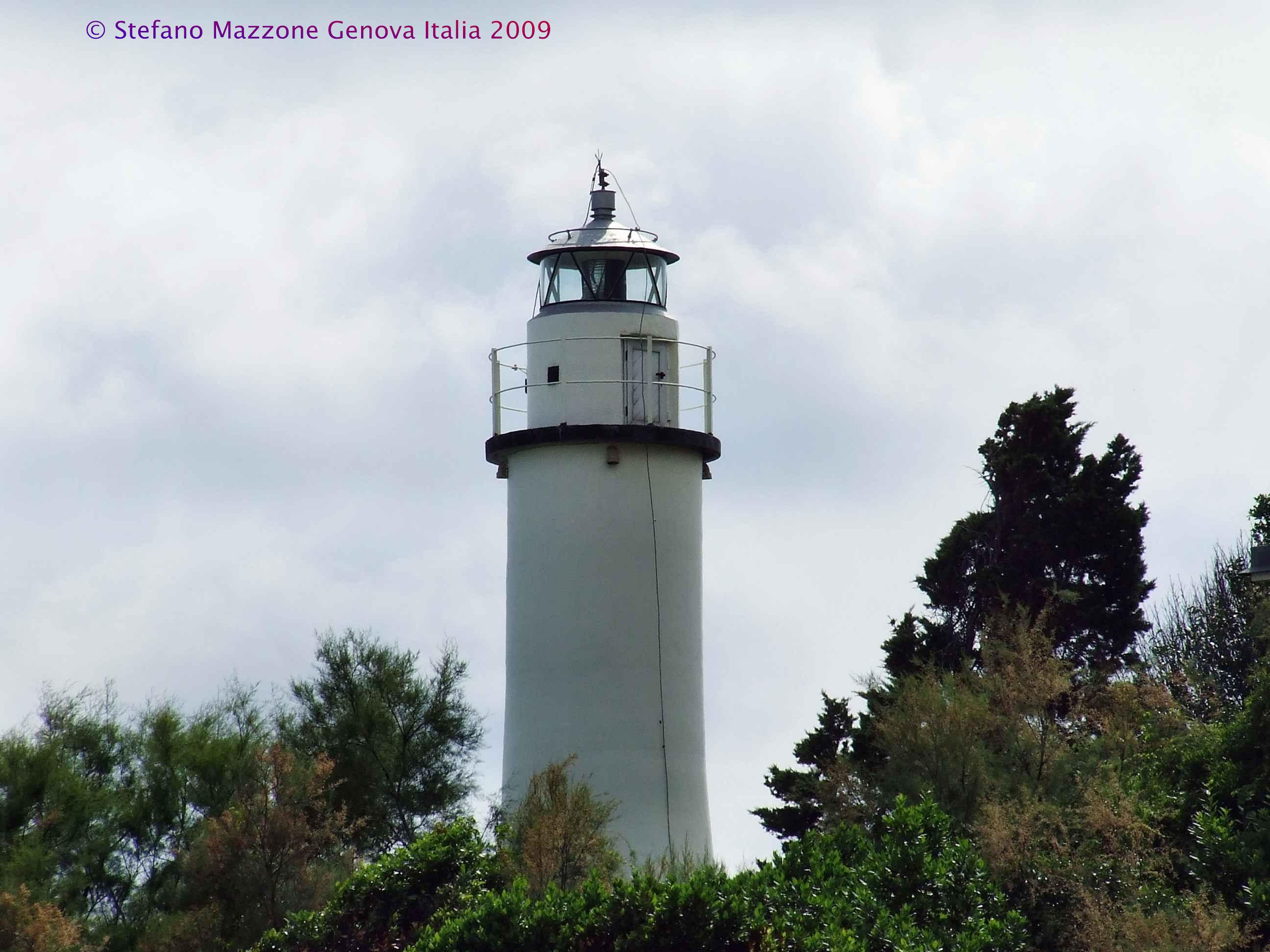
- Location: Genoa; Liguria; Italy
- Coordinates: 44°23′31″N 8°57′10″E

Tower
- Constructed: 1931
- Foundation: concrete base
- Construction: masonry tower
- Automated: yes
- Height: 8 metres (26 ft)
- Shape: cylindrical tower with balcony and lantern
- Markings: white tower, grey metallic lantern dome
- Power source: mains electricity
- Operator: Marina Militare

Light
- First lit: 1948
- Focal height: 26 metres (85 ft)
- Lens: Type TD focal length: 187.5 mm
- Intensity: main: AL 1000 W reserve: LABI 100 W
- Range: main: 16 nautical miles (30 km; 18 mi) reserve: 11 nautical miles (20 km; 13 mi)
- Characteristic: L Fl (3) W 15s.
- Italy no.: 1575 E.F.

Punta Vagno Lighthouse (Italian: Faro di Punta Vagno) is an active lighthouse located on the same name Cape at the east entrance of the Port of Genoa, Liguria on the Ligurian Sea.

== Description ==
The lighthouse was built at the end of 19th century, but was activated on October 10, 1931, and consists of a white masonry tapered cylindrical tower, 8 feet (2.4 m) high, with balcony and lantern. The tower was destroyed during World War II and was rebuilt in 1948. The lantern is painted in white, the dome in grey metallic, and is positioned at 26 metres (85 ft) above sea level and emits three long white flashes in a 15 seconds period, visible up to a distance of 16 nautical miles (30 km; 18 mi). The lighthouse is completely automated and operated by the Marina Militare with the identification code number 1575 E.F.

== See also ==
- List of lighthouses in Italy
- Genoa
