= Port of Genoa =

Coordinates: 44.4028°N 8.91667°E

Port of Genoa Italian: Porto di Genova
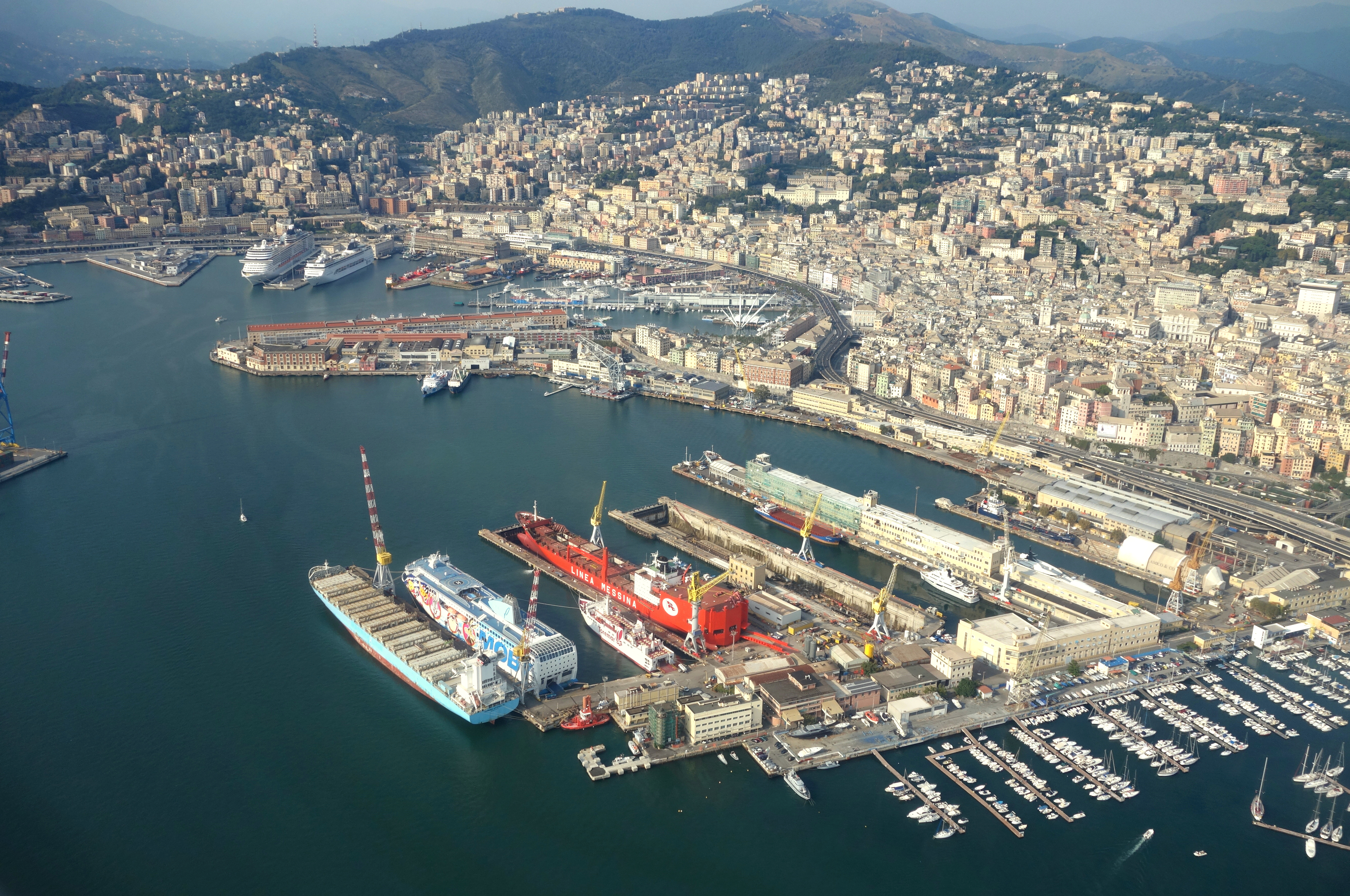
- Aerial view of the Harbour
- Interactive map of Port of Genoa; Italian: Porto di Genova

Location
- Country: Italy
- Location: Genoa

Details
- Opened: c. A.D. 1000
- Operated by: Genoa Port Authority
- Owned by: Genoa Port Authority
- Type of Harbor: Artificial
- Size of harbour: 500 ha (1,200 acres)
- Land area: 700 ha (1,700 acres)
- Size: 1,200 ha (3,000 acres)
- Employees: 4,274 (2009)

Statistics
- Vessel arrivals: 6,619 (2012)
- Annual cargo tonnage: 51,391,247 (2012)
- Annual container volume: 2,064,806 TEU (2012)
- Annual revenue: €71.6 million (2012)
- Main trades: coal, steel, oil, chemicals, food
- Website; Autorità Portuale di Genova

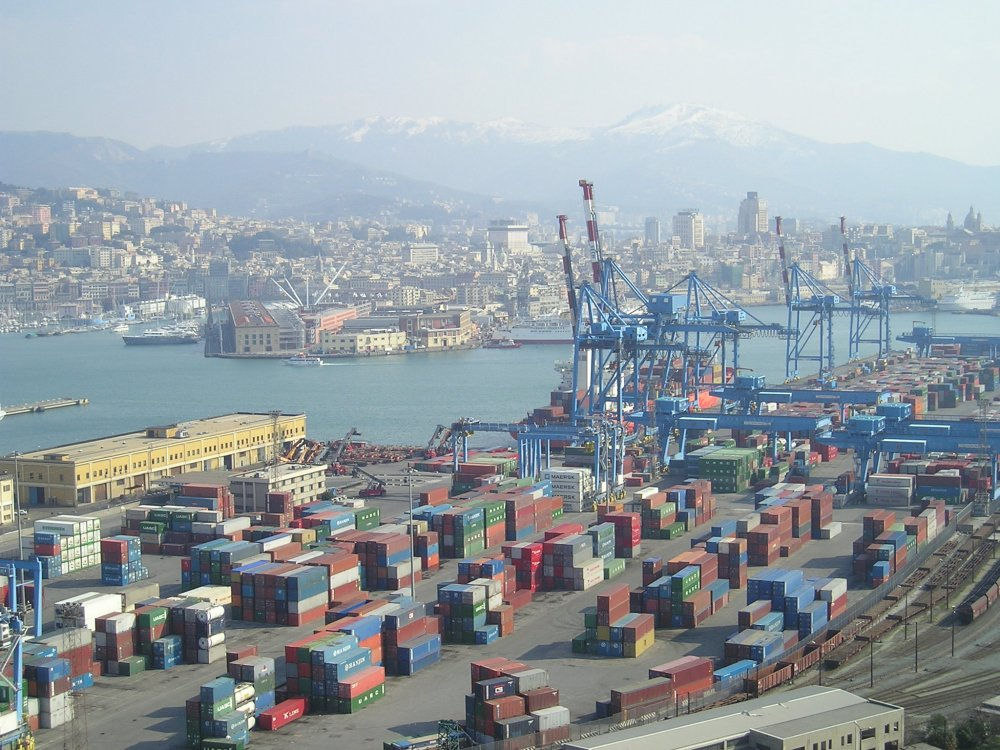
One of the container terminals of the port and the city of Genoa in the background

The Port of Genoa is one of Italy's principal seaports. In 2024, its trade volume reached approximately 64.5 million tonnes, making it one of the busiest ports in the country—second only to the Port of Trieste in total cargo tonnage. Administered by the Western Ligurian Sea Port Authority, the port is a major hub for both commercial traffic, handling containers, dry and liquid bulk, and passenger transport, including cruise ships and ferries. The port's terminal operations are also a significant economic driver for the region, with an estimated economic impact of €495 million in 2025 and the creation of nearly 3,500 direct jobs. Historically, the port has evolved continuously since the era of the Maritime republics. Today, it is a modern logistics hub integrated with Italy's railway and motorway networks, providing a crucial link to northern Italy and Central Europe. Its strategic position on the Ligurian Sea, along with recent terminal expansions, reinforces its importance within the Mediterranean transport system. Notably, the port was the site chosen for the dismantling of the Costa Concordia following the ship's disaster.

== Structural characteristics ==
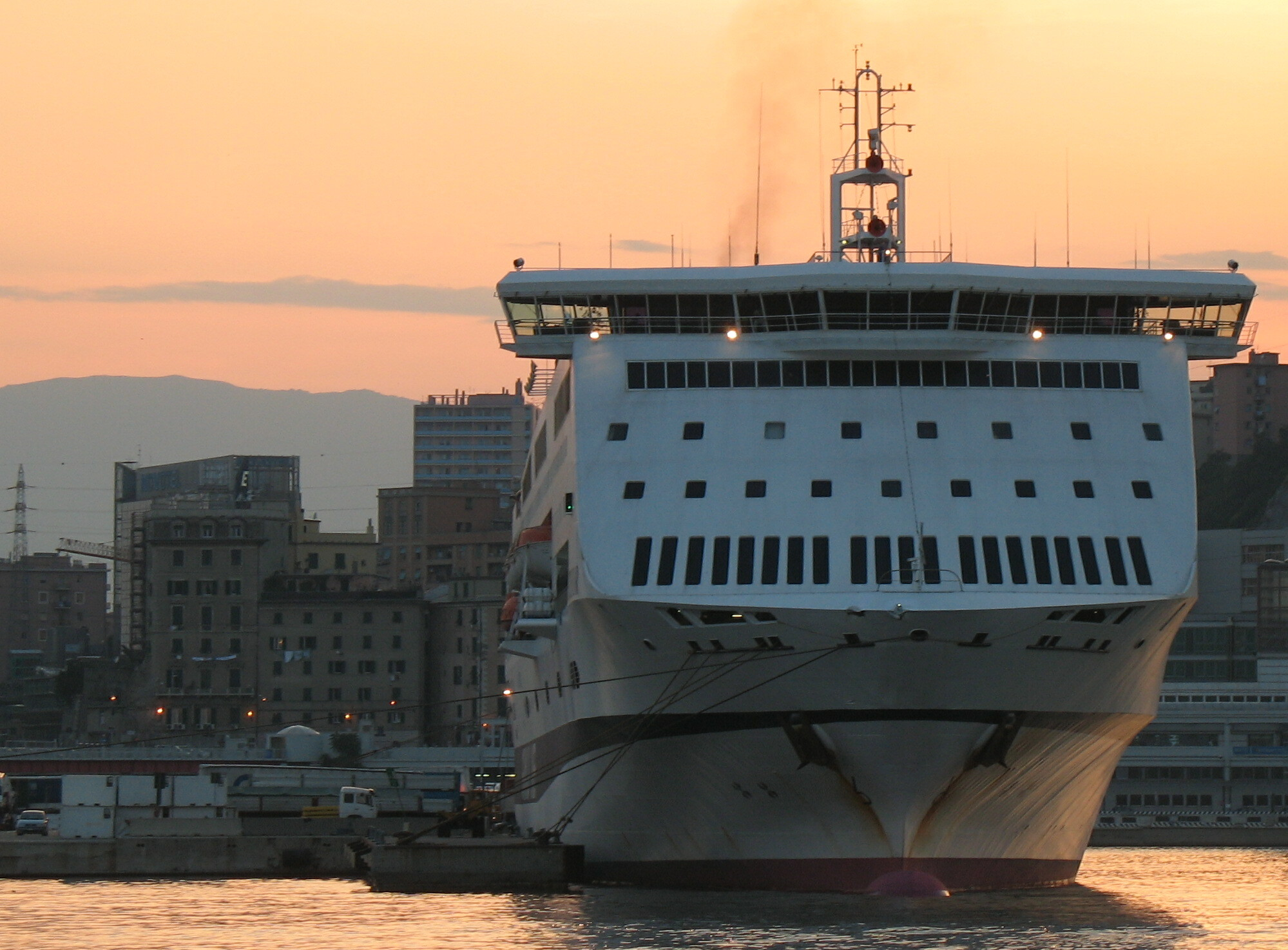
The ferry terminal in 2006

The Port of Genoa covers an area of about 700 hectares (1,700 acres) of land and 500 hectares (1,200 acres) on water, stretching for over 22 kilometres (14 mi) along the coastline, with 47 kilometres (29 mi) of maritime ways and 30 kilometres (19 mi) of operative quays.

=== Strategic position ===
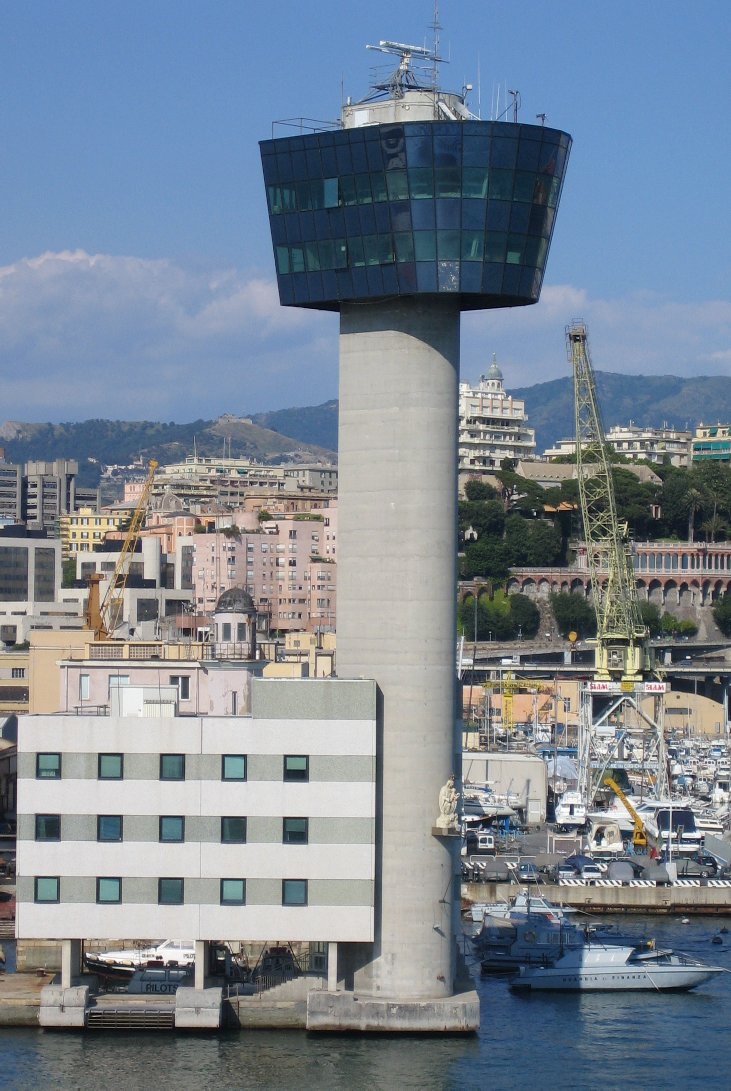
The control tower of the Port of Genoa as it appeared before its collapse in the incident of 7 May 2013

The Port of Genoa is the natural maritime gateway for the regions of North-west Italy and holds a strategic position relative to the European economic and commercial hinterland. It has a long and storied history.

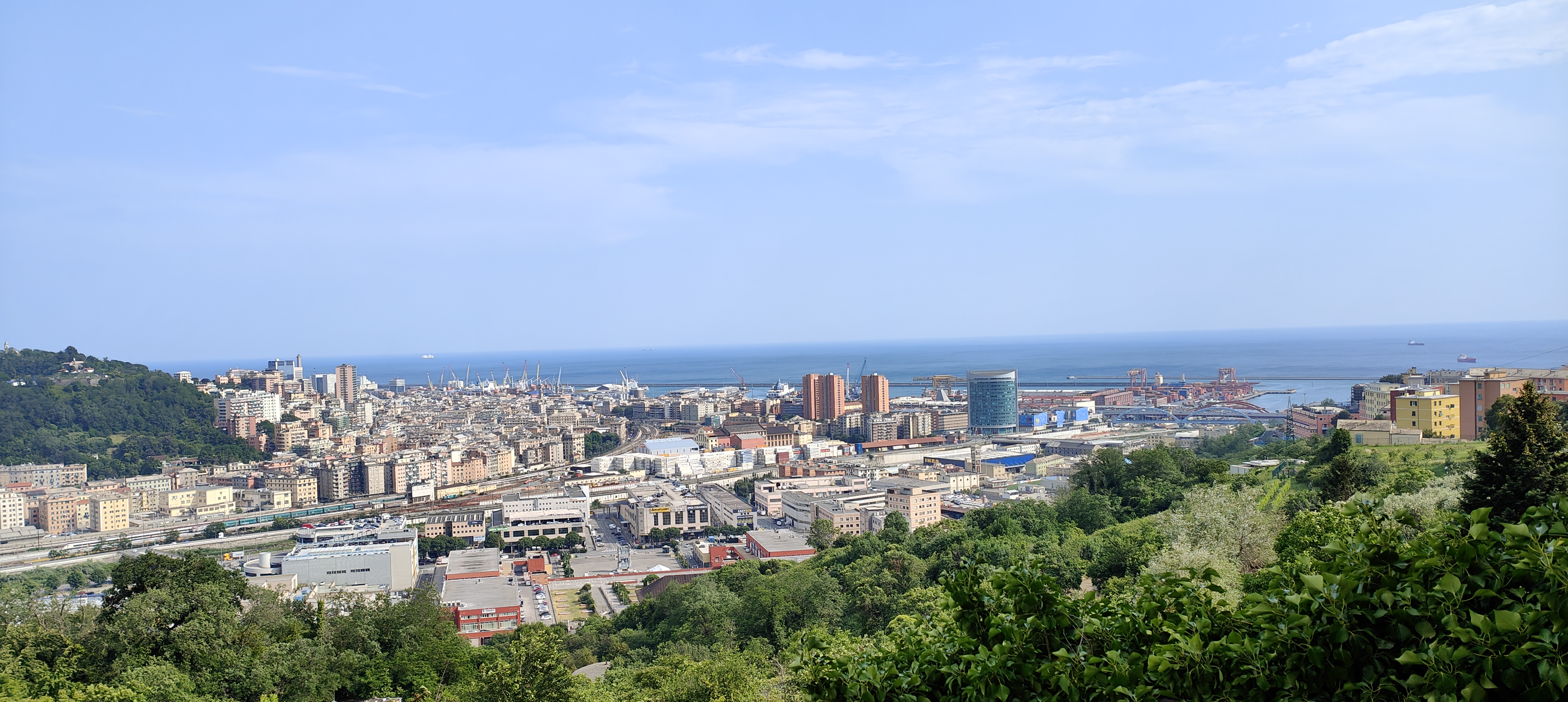
Panoramic view of the Port from the Santuario di Nostra Signora Incoronata. The area shown includes the districts of San Teodoro, Sampierdarena, and Cornigliano.

The port extends along the coastline from east (Levante) to west (Ponente). It begins at the Grazie basin, home to shipyards and naval repair workshops near the Foce trade fair district and the Duca degli Abruzzi marina, and stretches to the modern freight terminals located near the city's historic Lanterna. The port complex also includes the oil terminal in Multedo, near Pegli, and the container terminal in Pra', as well as the renewed Old Port area, which is visually defined by a six-kilometer elevated road. In the coastal stretch between Cornigliano and Sestri Ponente, several piers are dedicated to Fincantieri's new shipbuilding yards. Symbolically, the port holds a value for Genoa that transcends its purely functional role; it is intrinsically linked to the city's identity and history. This history also includes intense labour disputes, particularly in the late 1980s. These conflicts pitted the port workers (the camalli, heirs to the historic caravana who loaded and unloaded cargo from steamships at the old docks and grain silos) against the port authority. The authority faced the urgent need for radical modernization to compete with the increasingly dominant ports of Northern Europe. Following the collapse of the Ponte Morandi, debate has intensified around several key infrastructure projects, with potential funding from the European Union. These include the creation of an intermodal freight hub in the Province of Alessandria, a new customs gate for international goods on the right bank of the Polcevera stream, and the implementation of 24/7 terminal operations. These measures are intended to divert 4,000 heavy vehicles from city traffic during peak hours and help close a short-term competitiveness gap. The port area is also highly accessible for passengers and ferries, with direct connections to the main motorway, rail, and airport networks.

=== Antiquity and Middle Ages ===
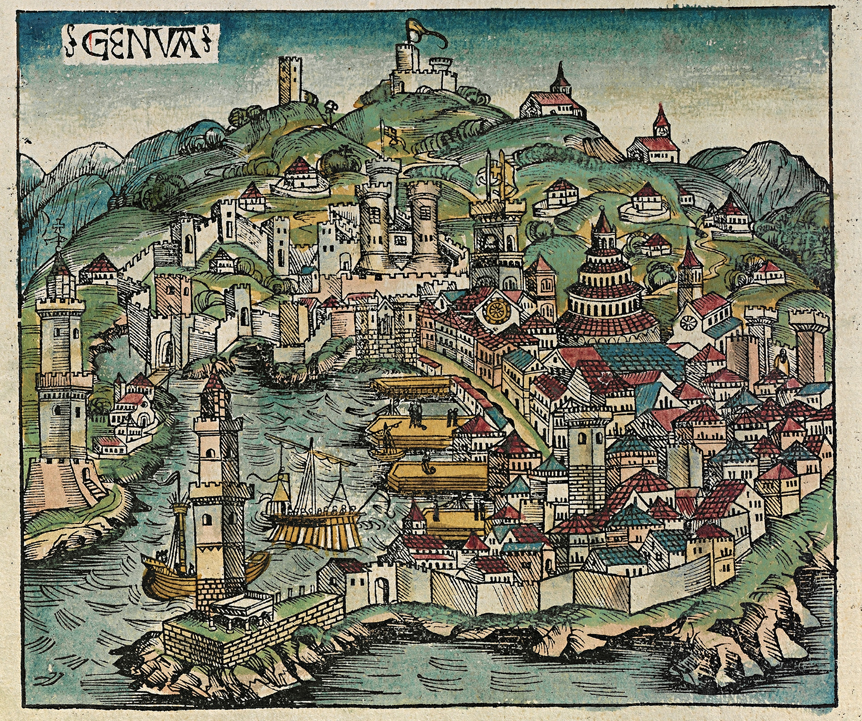
Genoa. Woodcut from the Nuremberg Chronicle, 1493

The area of Porto Antico (Old Port) was already inhabited during the Neolithic period. Beginning around 500 BC, a fortified settlement was established there, likely founded and inhabited by a mixed population of Ligures, Etruscans, and Greeks. During the Second Punic War, the settlement, an ally of the Roman Republic, was destroyed, but it was rebuilt around 200 BC. Subsequently, it developed into a regional commercial center. Almost nothing is known about the exact layout or utilization of the natural harbor during this era.

During the period of the Barbarian invasions and the Early Middle Ages, all communication routes established in the Roman era fell into disrepair. Starting in the 9th century, the small port town was repeatedly attacked by the Saracens. These incursions spurred the formation of Genoese naval forces, which played a significant role in the Mediterranean in the subsequent centuries. In the 11th century, they participated in the liberation of Sardinia and Corsica, as well as the First Crusade, thereby laying the groundwork for the Genoese colonies. The port of Genoa consequently served as both a base for the military fleet and a crucial commercial hub.

The Republic of Genoa defeated its major rival Pisa at the Battle of Meloria in 1284, and checked the expansion of its competitor the Venetian Republic at the Battle of Curzola in 1298, thus securing its position in the Black Sea. These highly favorable circumstances for Genoa between the 11th and 15th century explain the importance revested by the port during that period.

The foundation of the current (old) port can be traced back to the fortification of Genoa in the High Middle Ages and the creation of the office of the Consoli del Mare (Consuls of the Sea), who oversaw the port's expansion and operations. Around 1128, a first lighthouse (precursor to the modern Lanterna) was built on the promontory of San Benigno.

Around 1250, the rocky spur on the eastern side of the natural harbor was extended through landfill to form a breakwater. From the 16th century, this was called the Molo Vecchio (Old Mole or Old Quay), in contrast to the Molo Nuovo (New Mole) that was built on the opposite side of the bay, near the lighthouse. The inner bay formed by the Molo Vecchio became the mooring area for numerous vessels, which were likely referred to as Mandria (Herd) or Gregge (Flock). The term Mandracchio, which in modern Italian denotes small fishing ports or marinas, is likely based on Mandria. However, in Genoa, this bay is specifically named Mandraccio. Other explanations suggest the term derives from the Greek Mandràki, meaning enclosure (fence), or has Arabic origins.

Alongside the construction of the Molo Vecchio, a Maritime Arsenal was built, as well as Palazzo del Mare (the Palace of the Sea), later renamed Palazzo San Giorgio. After serving as the seat of government, the palace became the main headquarters for the Banco di San Giorgio (Bank of Saint George), a financial institution of extraordinary importance to the Republic of Genoa. Today, the Port Authority is located in the building. Adjacent to the Molo Vecchio, and very close to the Palazzo San Giorgio, were six wooden landing jetties. These were named after the goods handled there or after the influential families who resided nearby (including the Spinola and Grimaldi). These jetties were replaced by permanent piers in the 15th century. By the mid-16th century, the Molo Vecchio had reached a length of almost 500 meters. The city of Genoa and its port were significantly shaped by the architect Galeazzo Alessi. Under his direction, the development of the old port reached its completion.

== Passenger terminals ==
The quays of the passenger terminals extend over an area of 250 thousand square metres, with 5 equipped berths for cruise vessels and 13 for ferries, for an annual capacity of 4 million ferry passengers, 1.5 million cars and 250,000 trucks.

A third cruise terminal is currently under construction in the redesigned area of Ponte Parodi, once a quay used for grain traffic.

== Lighthouses ==
There are two major lighthouses: the historical Lanterna, 76 metres (249 feet) tall, and the small lighthouse of Punta Vagno, at the eastern entrance of the port.

== Marinas ==
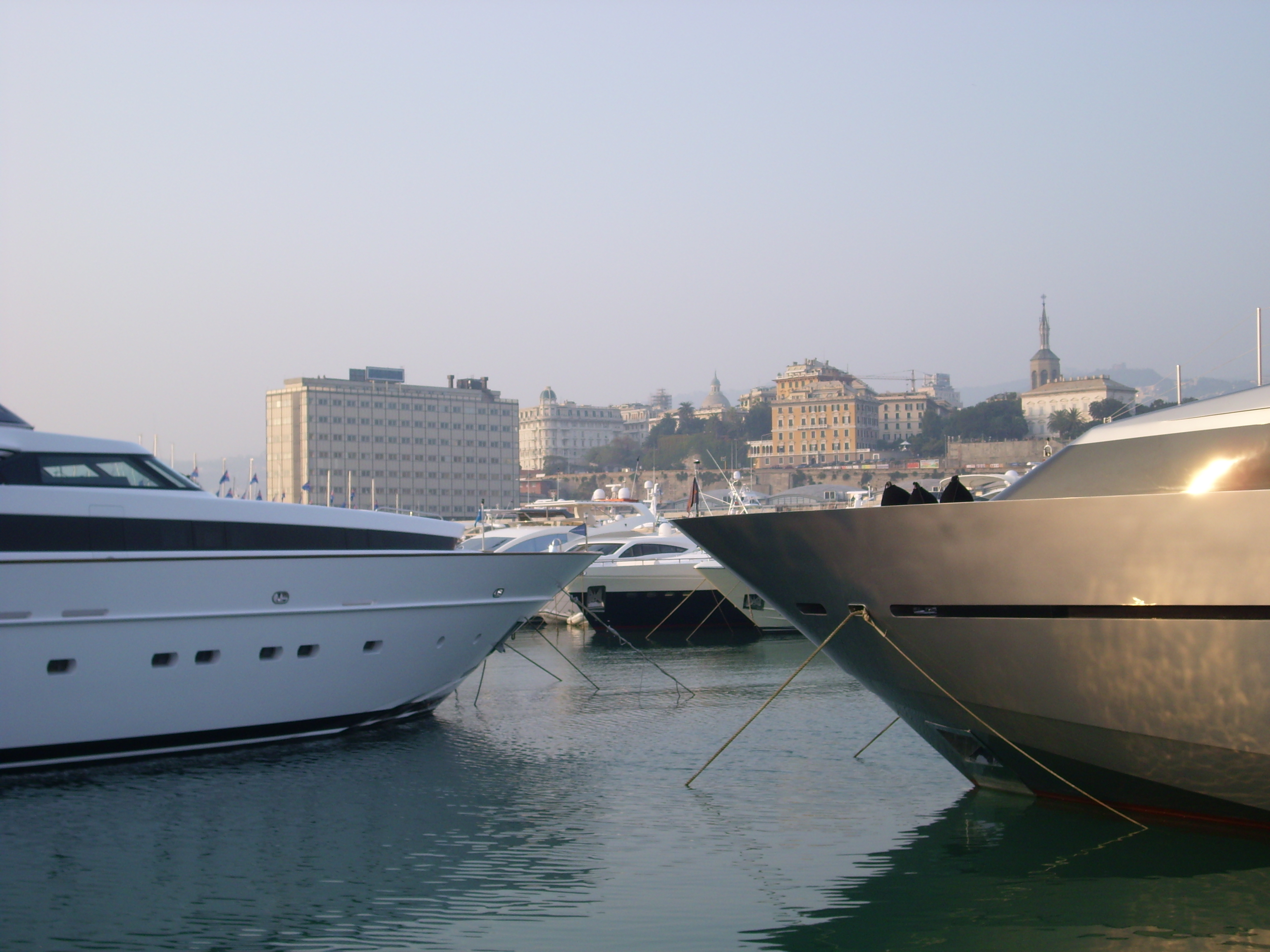
The marina of the Exhibition centre, home of the Genoa International Boat Show

Besides the container and the passenger terminals, the shipyards and the other industrial and cargo facilities, in the port area there are also several marinas, where many sailboats and yachts are moored.

- The marina of the Exhibition centre (305 berths).
- The marina Duca degli Abruzzi, home of the Yacht Club Italiano (350 berths)
- The marina Molo Vecchio, in the area of the old harbor (160 berths for yachts up to 150 metres)
- The marina Porto antico (280 berths up to 60 metres)
- The marina Genova Aeroporto (500 berths, with new facilities for superyachts)
- The marina of Pra', in the area of the old Pra' beach, now "Fascia di Rispetto di Pra'" (1000 berths)
