= Port of Naples =

Coordinates: 40°50′N 14°16′E

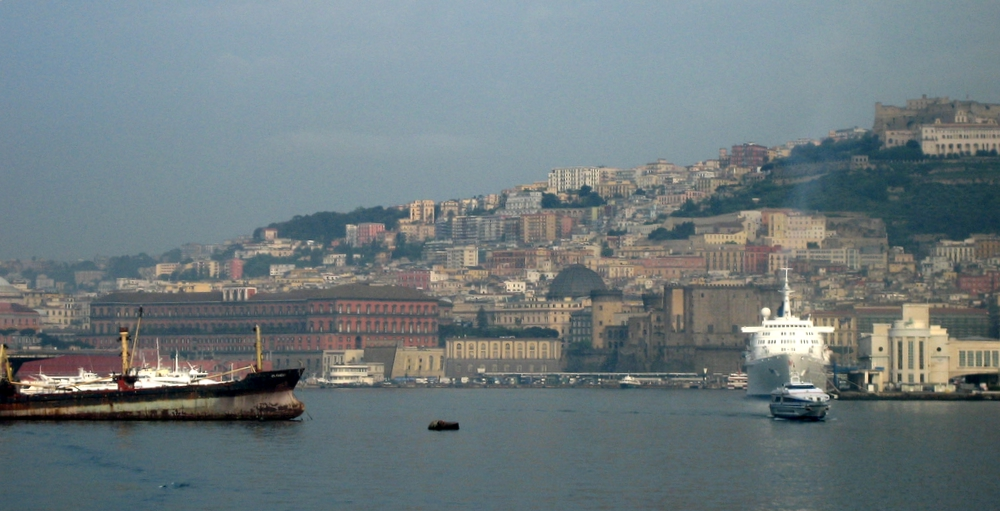
- Harbour
- Interactive map of Port of Naples

Location
- Country: Italy
- Location: Naples

Details
- Owned by: Port Authority of Naples
- Type of Harbor: Natural/Artificial
- Size of harbour: 266 ha (2.66 sq km)
- Land area: 142.6 ha (1.426 sq km)
- Size: 408.6 ha (4.086 sq km)
- No. of berths: 38
- No. of wharfs: 75
- Employees: 4,866 (2007)
- General manager: Antonio Del Mese

Statistics
- Vessel arrivals: 63,788 vessels (2008)
- Annual cargo tonnage: 20,269,163 tonnes (2007)
- Annual container volume: 460,812 TEU's (2007)
- Passenger traffic: 8,988,056 people (2007)
- Annual revenue: US$ 950 million (2007)
- Net income: US$ 253 million (2007)
- Website www.porto.napoli.it

The Port of Naples, a port located on the Western coast of Italy, is the 11th largest seaport in Italy having an annual traffic capacity of around 25 million tons of cargo and 500,000 TEU's. It is also serves as a tourist hub, servicing an estimated 10 million people annually transiting through the port.

The port employs more than 4,800 and services more than 64,000 ships a year.

== General information ==
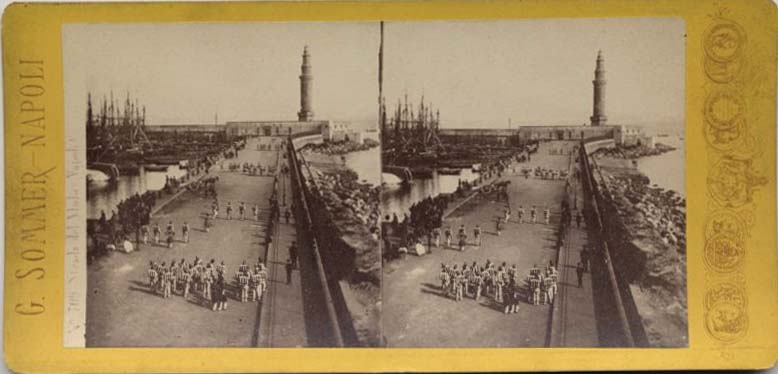
The port between 1834 - 1914

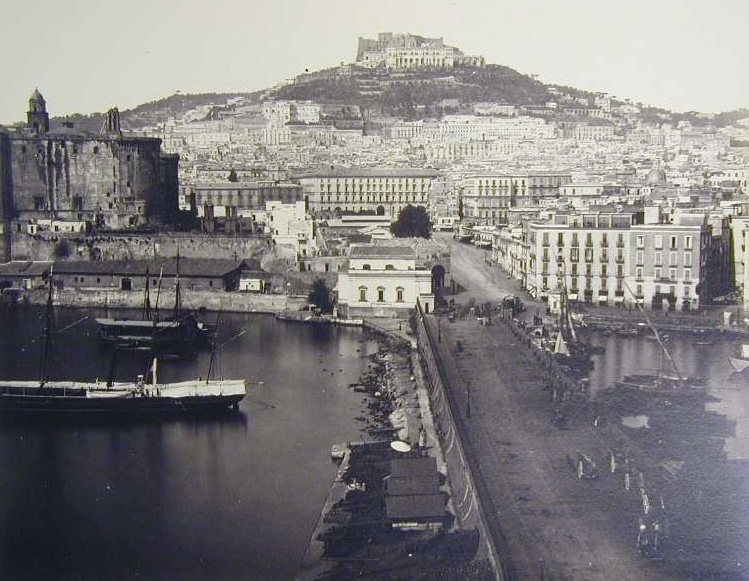
The port between 1834 - 1891

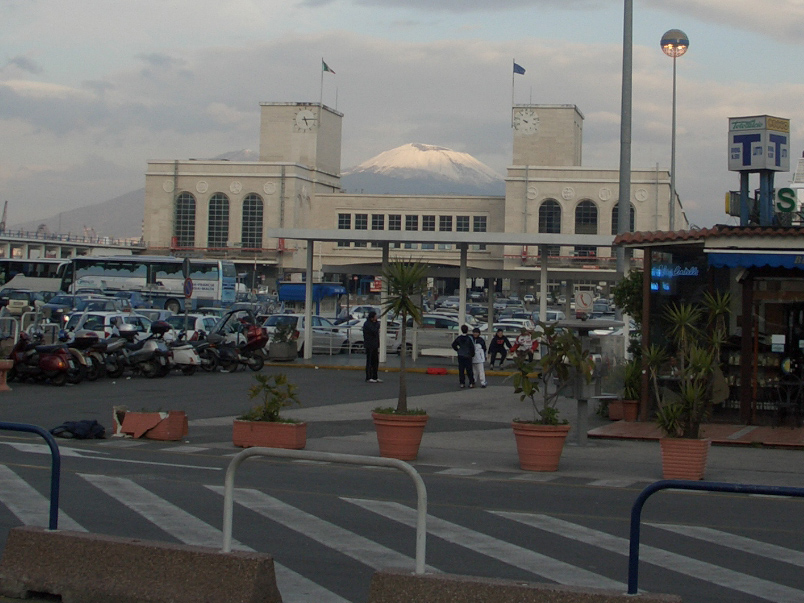
The maritime station

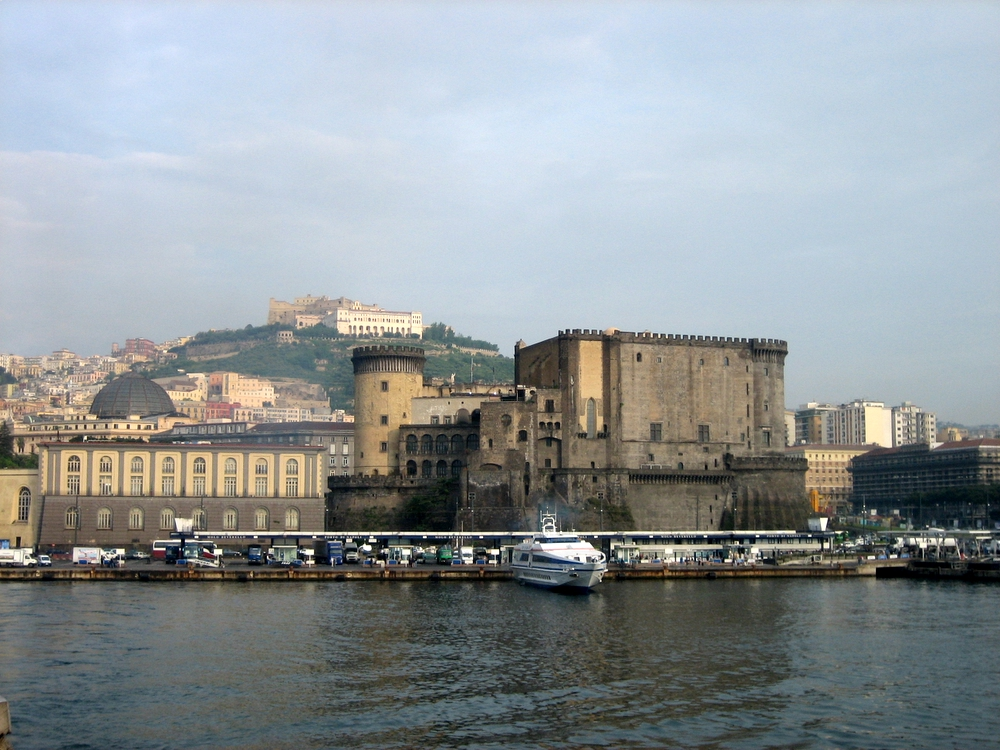
Harbour

The Port of Naples is situated in the centre of Naples, very close to the central Piazza Municipio, near Piazza Garibaldi (Naples Metro and Naples metropolitan railway service terminals) and about 15 km (9.3 mi) from Naples International Airport.

== History ==
=== During World War II ===
During World War II, Naples was a major strategic objective in the Italian campaign. Naples was an important node of Axis naval and land communication and there was a large and very potent German military presence located in the city.

In June 1940, the port suffered damage from French bombings.

Naples was the first large Italian city targeted by the Allies' Operation Avalanche, commencing in September 1943, with the seizure of the port being one of its primary targets.

During the Four Days of Naples, an uprising in Naples against Nazi German Occupation Forces, 240,000 people were forced to abandon their homes along the coast in the vicinity of the port. This was a potential prelude to the destruction of the port and the district surrounding it to deny it to the Allied attackers. This threat did not, however, materialise.

Naples, along with the port was captured by allies on 1 October 1943.

Though the Germans had sunk all ships located in the port, the allies had it back in operation in under a week.

== Activity ==
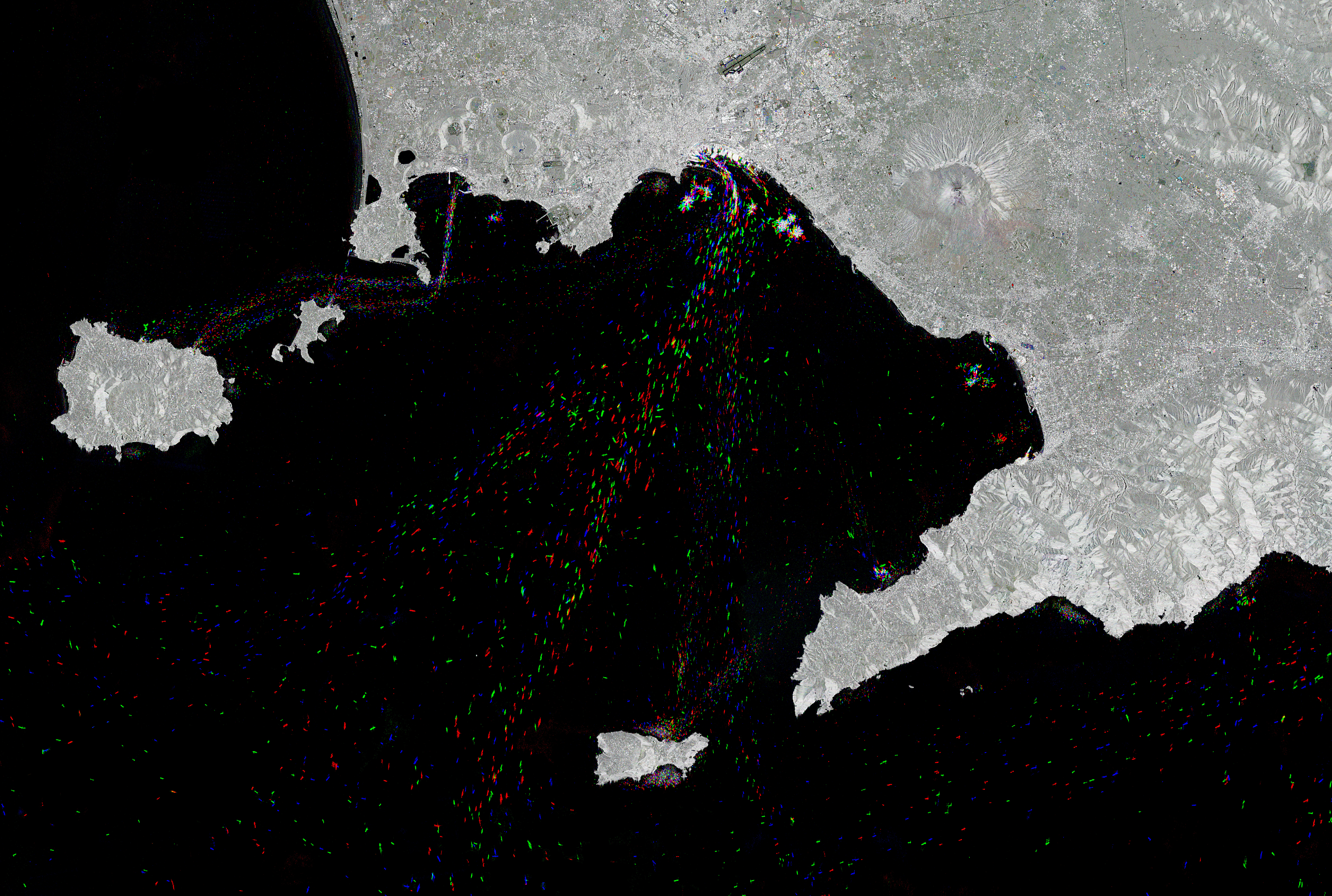
radar view of maritime traffic

In 2025 the Port of Naples handled 18,892,792 tonnes of cargo and 638,585 TEU's making it one of the busiest cargo ports in Italy and one of the largest container ports in the country.

Cargo and passenger movements (2025)
Type	Quantity
Liquid bulk	6,270,865^{*}
Dry bulk	1,358,334^{*}
RoRo	4,558,408^{*}
Containerized Cargo (Excluding RoRo)	6,705,186^{*}
Containers (TEU's)	638,585
Total Cargo	18,892,792^{*}
Number of local and ferry passengers	7,614,020
Number of cruise passengers	1,829,254
Total Passengers	9,443,274

*tonnes

== Terminals ==
=== Container terminal ===
The terminal has a storage capacity of 1,336,000 m^{2}, 70 mooring places, 11.5 km of docks and an annual traffic capacity of around 500,000 TEU's.

=== Commercial cargo ===
The commercial cargo section of the port has four terminals: one for timber, one for cellulose and two for cereals with a total storage area of 75,000 m^{2} (810,000 sq ft) (35,000 sq m for timber and cellulose and 40,000 sq m for cereals).

=== Automobile terminal ===
The Port of Naples has one RoRo terminal with a total length of 850 m, a land area of 120,000 m^{2}, storage capacity of 8,000 cars and a transshipment capacity of 900,000 units per year. The daily traffic with Sicily alone is 700 vehicles per day.

In 2007 the RoRo terminal handled 370,000 trucks and 475,000 cars.

=== Passenger terminal ===
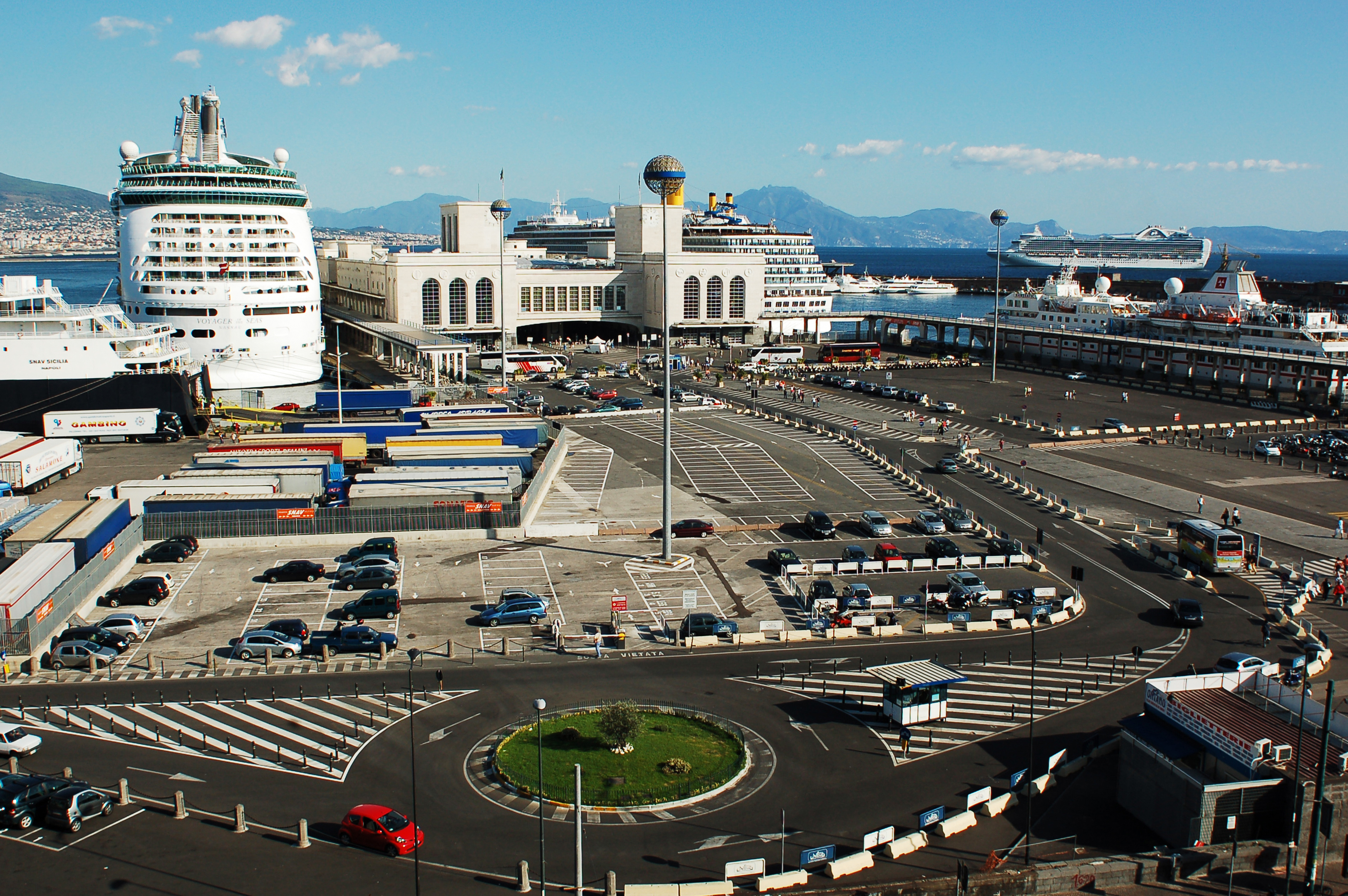
View of the Port of Naples (Maritime Station front view) Naples, Campania, Italy, Southern Europe

The Port of Naples is one of the largest passenger ports in Italy and one of the largest passenger ports in Europe with a total traffic of 8,988,056 people in 2007.

The cruise terminal has ten mooring places, seven mobile walkways, 12 computerised check-in desks and an annual traffic capacity of around 1.5 million passengers.

== Shipyard ==
The shipyards are an important part of the Port of Naples. The structures of the ports shipyards consist of 3 brick-built docks and 4 floating docks.

The sector involves four large companies and 60 small workshops which undertake ship repairs, that have a total number of 2,000 employees and a turnover over US$200 million.
