= SS Ohioan (1914) =

1914 cargo ship

Coordinates: 37°46′43″N 122°30′58″W

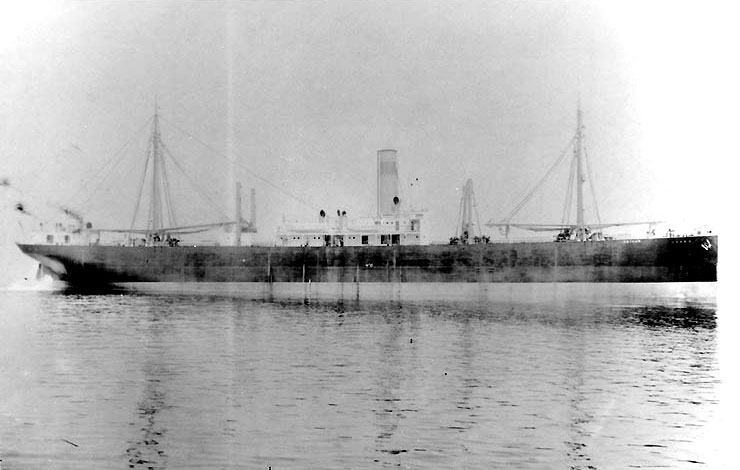
- SS Ohioan as she appeared before her U.S. Navy service in World War I

History
- Name: SS Ohioan
- Owner: American-Hawaiian Steamship Company
- Port of registry: New York
- Ordered: May 1912
- Builder: Maryland Steel; Sparrows Point, Maryland
- Cost: $730,000
- Yard number: 133
- Launched: 18 April 1914
- Completed: 30 June 1914
- Identification: US official number: 212314
- Fate: Requisitioned by U.S. Navy

United States
- Name: USS Ohioan (ID-3280)
- Acquired: 5 August 1918
- Commissioned: 7 August 1918
- Decommissioned: 6 October 1919
- Fate: Returned to American-Hawaiian
- Name: SS Ohioan
- Owner: American-Hawaiian Steamship Company
- Acquired: 22 September 1919
- Fate: Grounded at San Francisco, October 1936

General characteristics
- Type: Cargo ship
- Tonnage: 6,649 GRT; 9,920 LT DWT
- Length: 407 ft 7 in (124.23 m) (LPP); 428 ft 8 in (130.66 m) (overall)
- Beam: 53 ft 8 in (16.36 m)
- Draft: 29 ft 6 in (8.99 m)
- Propulsion: oil-fired boilers; 1 × quadruple-expansion steam engine; 1 × screw propeller
- Speed: 12 knots (22 km/h)
- Capacity: Cargo: 438,154 cubic feet (12,407.1 m^{3})
- Crew: 18 officers, 40 crewmen
- Notes: Sister ships: Dakotan, Montanan, Pennsylvanian, Minnesotan, Washingtonian, Panaman, Iowan

General characteristics (as USS Ohioan)
- Troops: 1,400
- Complement: 70
- Armament: 1 × 5-inch (130 mm) gun; 1 × 3-inch (76 mm) gun

SS Ohioan was a cargo ship built in 1914 for the American-Hawaiian Steamship Company. During World War I, she was taken over by the United States Navy and commissioned as USS Ohioan (ID-3280).

Ohioan was built by the Maryland Steel Company as one of eight sister ships ordered by the American-Hawaiian Steamship Company for inter-coastal service cargo via the Panama Canal. When the canal was temporarily closed by landslides in late 1915, Ohioan sailed via the Straits of Magellan until the canal reopened in mid 1916. During World War I, USS Ohioan carried cargo, animals, and a limited number of passengers to France, and returned over 8,000 American troops after the Armistice, including the highly decorated American soldier Alvin York. After Ohioan's naval service ended in 1919, she was returned to her original owners.

Ohioan's post-war career was relatively uneventful until 8 October 1936, when she ran aground near Seal Rock at the Golden Gate, the entrance to San Francisco Bay. Attempts to free the ship were unsuccessful and, because of the close proximity of the wreck to San Francisco, the grounded Ohioan drew large crowds to watch salvage operations. Angelo J. Rossi, the mayor of San Francisco, toured the wreck on 19 October. Ohioan's hulk caught fire in March 1937, and the wreck broke into two pieces in a storm in December. As late as 1939, some of Ohioan's rusty steel beams were still visible on the rocks.

== Design and construction ==
In May 1912, the American-Hawaiian Steamship Company placed an order with the Maryland Steel Company of Sparrows Point, Maryland, for two new cargo ships—Iowan and Ohioan. (Note: Maryland Steel had built three ships—Kentuckian, Georgian, and Honolulan—for American-Hawaiian in 1909 in what proved to be a satisfactory arrangement for both companies. In September 1911 and November 1912, American-Hawaiian placed an order for Ohioan's six older sister ships; Minnesotan, Dakotan, Montanan, and Pennsylvanian in the earlier order, Washingtonian and Panaman in the latter.) The contract cost of the ships was set at the construction cost plus an 8% profit for Maryland Steel, but with a maximum price of $640,000 per ship. Maryland Steel financed the construction with a credit plan which called for a 5% down payment in cash followed by nine monthly installments for the balance. The deal allowed for some of the nine installments to be converted into longer-term notes or mortgages. The final cost of Ohioan, including financing costs, was $73.58 per deadweight ton, which came out to just under $730,000.

Ohioan (Maryland Steel yard no. 133) was the second ship built under the contract. She was launched on 24 January 1914, and delivered to American-Hawaiian on 30 June. The ship was 6,649 gross register tons (GRT), and was 407 feet 7 inches (124.23 m) in length (between perpendiculars) and 53 feet 8 inches (16.36 m) abeam. She had a deadweight tonnage of 9,920 LT DWT, and her cargo holds, which had a storage capacity of 438,154 cubic feet (12,407.1 m^{3}), were outfitted with a complete refrigeration plant so that she could carry perishable products from the West Coast—such as fresh produce from Southern California farms—to the East Coast. Ohioan had a single steam engine powered by oil-fired boilers that drove a single screw propeller at a speed of 12 knots (22 km/h).

== Early career ==
When Ohioan began sailing for American-Hawaiian, the company shipped cargo from East Coast ports via the Straits of Magellan to West Coast ports and Hawaii, and vice versa. (Note: Prior to the 21 April 1914 United States occupation of Veracruz, American-Hawaiian had used the Tehuantepec Route, but after the U.S. action, that route was closed by the Huerta-led Mexican government. Shipments on that Tehuantepec Route would arrive at Mexican ports—Salina Cruz, Oaxaca, for eastbound cargo, and Coatzacoalcos, Veracruz, for westbound cargo—and would traverse the Isthmus of Tehuantepec on the Tehuantepec National Railway. See: Hovey, p. 78.) Eastbound shipments were primarily sugar and pineapple from Hawaii, but westbound cargoes were more general in nature. Following the opening of the Panama Canal on 15 August 1914, American-Hawaiian ships switched to take that route.

As World War I continued in Europe and increased the demand for defense-related shipping, American-Hawaiian stopped its sugar service. Ohioan's specific activities during this time are not known. She may have been in the half of the American-Hawaiian fleet that was chartered for transatlantic service, or she may have been in the group of American-Hawaiian ships chartered for service to South America, delivering coal, gasoline, and steel in exchange for coffee, nitrates, cocoa, rubber, and manganese ore.

== World War I ==
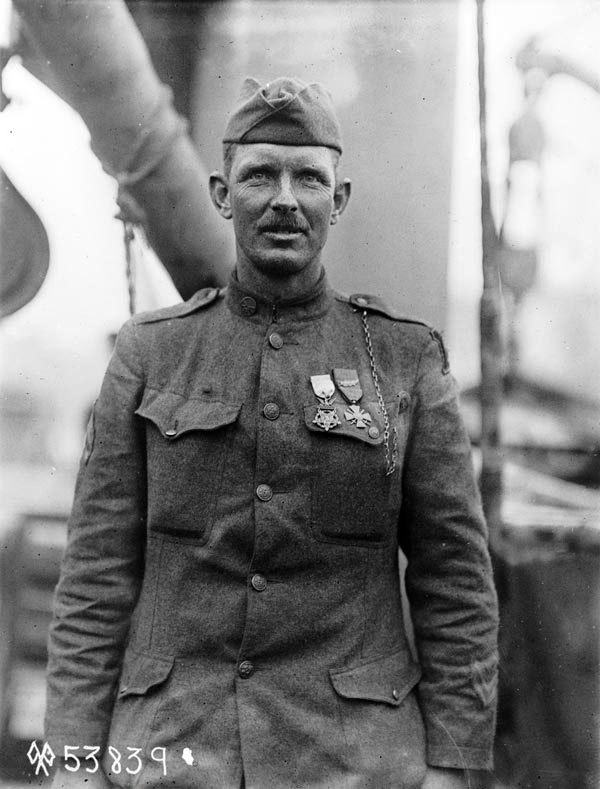
Sergeant Alvin York at his press conference held on board USS Ohioan upon arrival in New York, 22 May 1919

Unlike her surviving sister ships, (Note: Washingtonian had been in a collision and sank in New York Harbor in January 1915.) there is no evidence that Ohioan was ever chartered by the United States Army; (Note: Dakotan, Montanan, Pennsylvanian, Minnesotan, Panaman, and Iowan had all been chartered by the U.S. Army and most carried cargo and horses in that duty. Montanan was torpedoed and sunk while in Army service in 1917.) Ohioan's activities between the United States' declaration of war on Germany in April 1917, and her acquisition by the United States Navy on 5 August 1918, are unknown. She was commissioned into the Naval Overseas Transportation Service (NOTS) two days later, under a loan charter. After a refit and taking on a load of cargo, Ohioan sailed for Saint-Nazaire, France, where she arrived on 29 August. Dividing the next month between that port and Brest, Ohioan sailed for New York on 1 October. Fitted there with horse stalls, she loaded 60 officers and men, and equestrian and general cargo, before sailing on 1 November for La Pallice.

With the signing of the Armistice on 11 November the fighting came to an end, and the task of bringing home American soldiers began almost immediately. Upon her return to the United States on 5 December, Ohioan was selected to become a troop transport and transferred from the NOTS to the Cruiser and Transport Force. Before she could begin returning troops, Ohioan had to be converted from a cargo and animal ship. Although sources do not indicate the specific modifications Ohioan underwent, typical conversions for other ships included the installation of berths, and adding greatly expanded cooking and toilet facilities to handle the large numbers of men aboard. Similar modifications on Ohioan's sister ship Minnesotan took three months, but it is not known how long Ohioan's refit took.

In March, Ohioan returned 1,627 men to New York, mostly from the 348th Infantry Regiment of the U.S. 87th Infantry Division, followed by another 1,596 officers and men, and 1,000 homing pigeons on 16 April. Among the pigeons was Cher Ami—the only bird sent out by the Lost Battalion that was able to get a message through—and 100 captured German pigeons. Cher Ami had received the French Croix de Guerre with Palm and had been recommended for the U.S. Army Distinguished Service Cross by General John J. Pershing.

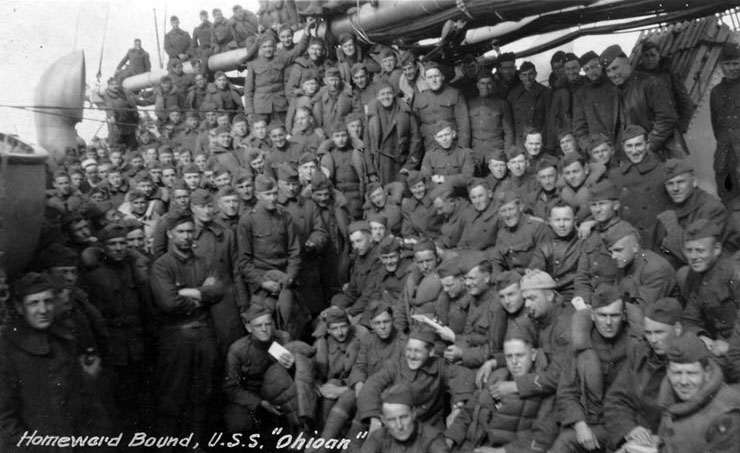
U.S. soldiers crowd the deck during their return home on USS Ohioan

Ohioan docked at New York on 22 May on her next voyage with a portion of the 328th Infantry Regiment of the 82nd Division. One of the members of the unit was Sergeant Alvin C. York, who had led an attack on a German machine gun nest during the Meuse-Argonne Offensive and captured 132 German officers and men. York had been honored with the U.S. Medal of Honor and the French Croix de Guerre with Palm (among other awards), both of which he wore on his coat on arrival at New York. After Ohioan docked, York held a well-attended press conference on board.

On 20 June, Ohioan returned another load of troops that included Base Hospital 98, and the 20th Engineers. By the time Ohioan had completed her sixth and final trooping voyage on 16 September 1919, Ohioan had carried home 8,383 healthy and wounded men. USS Ohioan was decommissioned on 6 October 1919, and returned to American-Hawaiian.

== Later career ==
Ohioan resumed cargo service with American-Hawaiian after her return from World War I service. Although the company had abandoned its original Hawaiian sugar routes by that time, Ohioan continued inter-coastal service through the Panama Canal relatively uneventfully for the next 17 years. On 23 November 1933, Ohioan collided with Liberty in the Ambrose Channel. She was consequently beached near the West Bank Light. Ohioan was refloated on 26 November.

In early morning hours of 8 October 1936, Ohioan ran aground near Seal Rock on the south shore of the Golden Gate, just outside San Francisco Bay. The ship, sailing in a dense fog, strayed too close to shore and grounded on the rocks, sending a shower of sparks that lit up the night. When the fog cleared later in the morning, the ship was firmly seated on the rocks at the base of a 250-foot (76 m) cliff, and some 300 feet (91 m) from the mainland. Coast Guardsmen on shore attached three lines to the ship and set up a breeches buoy to take off the harbor pilot, but the crew stayed on board the ship in hopes that the high tide would free her from the rocky perch. As word of the shipwreck spread, spectators clambered over the cliff to get a view of the scene; one man died from a heart attack and two women broke ankles in separate falls. Newsboys soon arrived on the scene, selling newspapers telling of Ohioan's woe within sight of the stranded ship. Policemen were called out to keep order as the crowd grew into the thousands.

The next day, as the seas battered the ship and drove her farther on the rocks, two Coast Guard boats took 31 men from the ship. (Note: Three officers and two cooks remained on board Ohioan to prevent a completely abandoned ship from becoming a salvage prize.) American-Hawaiian announced that a Los Angeles salvage firm had been hired to retrieve the 1,500-long-ton (1,520 t) cargo, which included explosives and oil. Two heavy-duty electric pumps were lowered to the ship via the breeches buoy, and plans were drawn up for connecting them to the San Francisco municipal electric system in order to pump out the ship.

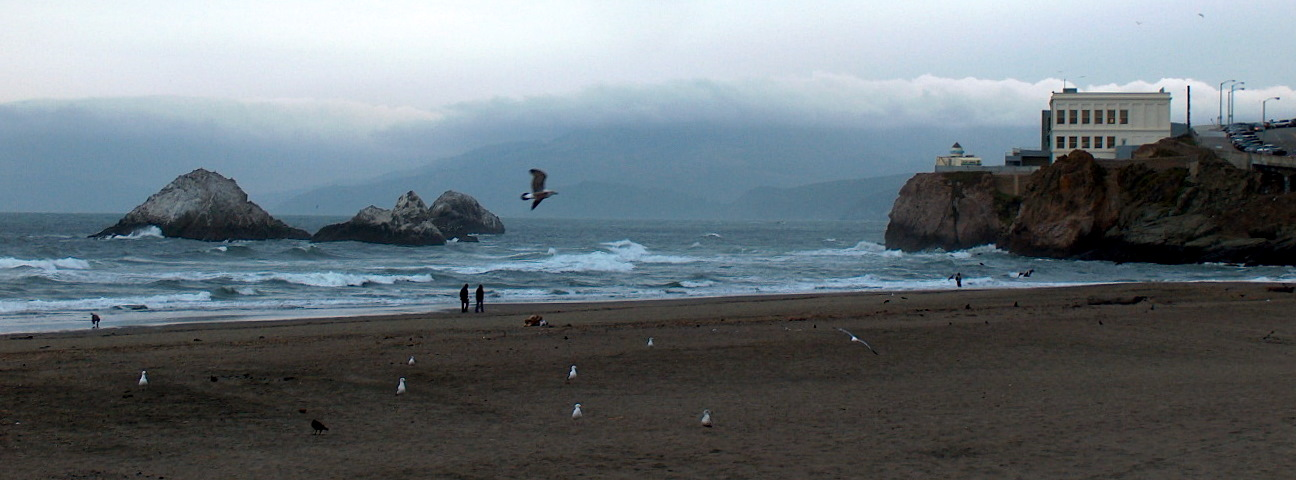
Ohioan ran aground near Seal Rock (left).

The crowds of onlookers continued to watch as salvage efforts progressed; a 75-year-old woman from Oakland fell down the embankment while watching the action on 13 October. The mayor of San Francisco, Angelo J. Rossi, rode the breeches buoy to the ship and toured it for 45 minutes on 19 October. On 22 October, the Los Angeles Times ran an Associated Press story saying that marine experts were considering the use of a method first patented by Abraham Lincoln in May 1849 in order to re-float the stranded ship. (Note: The patent, No. 6469, dated 22 May 1849, was entitled "Buoying vessels over shoals".) All efforts were unsuccessful, and by 31 October, American-Hawaiian placed an advertisement in the Los Angeles Times requesting bids for the purchase of the ship and her cargo "as and where she now lies ... on the rocks near Point Lobos, San Francisco". E. J. Mitchell was the winning bidder, securing rights to the ship and its cargo for $2,800.

In March 1937, five months after the wreck, the hulk of Ohioan—still aground near Seal Rock—caught fire when a watchman aboard the ship attempted to burn some meat in a refrigerator. The flames died out before reaching the explosives that remained aboard the wreck. A Pacific storm in December the same year caused the hulk of Ohioan to break in two. By 1939, only remnants of some of Ohioan's rusty steel beams were still visible on the rocks.

Author Mark Ellis Thomas suggests that English poet and novelist Malcolm Lowry may have been inspired by the wreck of Ohioan in his poem "In Tempest's Tavern". One excerpt from the poem refers to "The Ohio [sic] smoking in Frisco on a sharp pen / Of rock". At the time of Ohioan's grounding, Lowry was in San Diego, preparing to sail to Acapulco.

== Bibliography ==
- Cochran, Thomas C.; Ray Ginger (December 1954). "The American-Hawaiian Steamship Company, 1899–1919". The Business History Review. 28 (4). Boston: The President and Fellows of Harvard College: 343–365. doi:10.2307/3111801. ISSN 0007-6805. JSTOR 3111801. OCLC 216113867.
- Crowell, Benedict; Robert Forrest Wilson (1921). The Road to France: The Transportation of Troops and Military Supplies, 1917–1918. How America Went to War: An Account From Official Sources of the Nation's War Activities, 1917–1920. New Haven: Yale University Press. OCLC 18696066.
- Gleaves, Albert (1921). A History of the Transport Service: Adventures and Experiences of United States Transports and Cruisers in the World War. New York: George H. Doran Company. OCLC 976757.
- Hovey, Edmund Otis (1907). "The Isthmus of Tehuantepec and the Tehuantepec National Railway". Bulletin of the American Geographical Society. 39 (2). New York: American Geographical Society: 78–91. doi:10.2307/198380. ISSN 0190-5929. JSTOR 198380. OCLC 2097765.
- Lee, David D. (1985). Sergeant York: An American Hero. Lexington: University Press of Kentucky. ISBN 978-0-8131-1517-7. OCLC 10779862.
- Naval Historical Center. "Minnesotan". Dictionary of American Naval Fighting Ships. Navy Department, Naval History and Heritage Command.
- Naval Historical Center. "Ohioan". Dictionary of American Naval Fighting Ships. Navy Department, Naval History & Heritage Command.
- Riesenberg, Felix (1945) [1940]. Golden Gate: The Story of San Francisco Harbor. New York: Tudor Pub. Co. OCLC 19356199.
- Sprout, Jerry; Janine Sprout (2001). Golden Gate Trailblazer: Where to Hike, Stroll, Bike, Jog, Roll in San Francisco and Marin. Markleeville, California: Diamond Valley Co. ISBN 978-0-9670072-2-9. OCLC 47856075.
- Thomas, Mark Ellis (1992). "Under the Shadow of the Volcano; Malcolm Lowry's Poetry". In Sherrill Grace (ed.). Swinging the Maelstrom: New Perspectives on Malcolm Lowry. Montreal: McGill-Queen's University Press. ISBN 978-0-7735-0862-0. OCLC 28547699.
