= SS Iowan =

American cargo ship

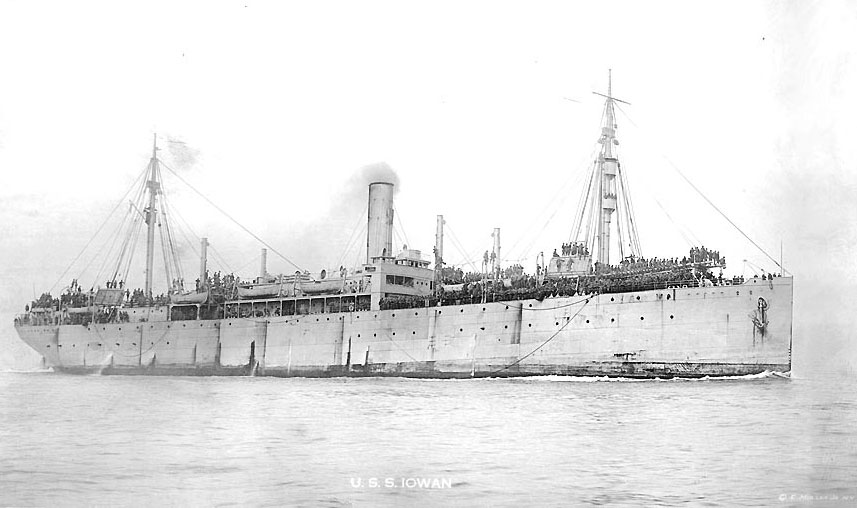
- USS Iowan (ID-3002) is seen here in 1919 returning American troops from France.

History
- Name: SS Iowan
- Owner: American-Hawaiian Steamship Company
- Port of registry: (United States) New York
- Ordered: May 1912
- Builder: Maryland Steel; Sparrows Point, Maryland
- Cost: $732,000
- Yard number: 132
- Launched: 24 January 1914
- Completed: 16 May 1914
- Identification: Official number: 212144; IMO number: 5535319
- Fate: Requisitioned by U.S. Navy

History

United States
- Name: USS Iowan (ID-3002)
- Acquired: 12 August 1918
- Commissioned: 12 August 1918
- Decommissioned: 18 September 1919
- Fate: Returned to American-Hawaiian

History
- Name: 1919: SS Iowan; 1943: SS Tashkent (Ташкент in Cyrillic)
- Namesake: 1943: Tashkent, the capital of Uzbekistan
- Owner: 1919: American-Hawaiian Steamship Company; 1942: War Shipping Administration
- Operator: 1942–1945: Soviet Pacific Fleet; 1945–1966: Far East Shipping Company
- Port of registry: 1919: (United States) New York; 1943: Soviet Union
- Fate: Transferred to North Korea, 1966; scrapped 1969

General characteristics
- Type: Cargo ship
- Tonnage: 6,529 GRT 10,175 LT DWT
- Length: 407 ft 7 in (124.23 m) (LPP); 428 ft 9 in (130.68 m) (overall)
- Beam: 53 ft 6 in (16.31 m)
- Draft: 28 ft (8.5 m)
- Depth of hold: 31 ft 6 in (9.60 m)
- Propulsion: oil-fired boilers; 1 × quadruple-expansion steam engine; 1 × screw propeller
- Speed: 14 knots (26 km/h)
- Capacity: Cargo: 490,859 cubic feet (13,899.6 m^{3})
- Crew: 18 officers, 40 crewmen
- Notes: Sister ships: Dakotan, Montanan, Pennsylvanian, Minnesotan, Washingtonian, Panaman, Ohioan

General characteristics (as USS Iowan)
- Displacement: 14,375 t
- Troops: 1,650
- Complement: 96
- Armament: 1 × 4-inch (100 mm) gun; 1 × 6-pounder (2.7 kg) gun

SS Iowan was a cargo ship built in 1914 for the American-Hawaiian Steamship Company. During World War I she was taken over by the United States Navy and commissioned as USS Iowan (ID-3002). During World War II, the ship was transferred to the Soviet Union and renamed SS Tashkent (or Ташкент in Cyrillic).

Iowan was built by the Maryland Steel Company as one of eight sister ships for the American-Hawaiian Steamship Company. In October 1914, five months after she was delivered to American-Hawaiian, Iowan rammed and sank the United Fruit Company steamer Metapan near the entrance to New York Harbor. After repairs, Iowan resumed inter-coastal service via the Panama Canal. When the canal was temporarily closed by landslides in late 1915, Iowan sailed via the Straits of Magellan until the canal reopened in mid 1916. During World War I, USS Iowan carried cargo, animals, and a limited number of passengers to France, and returned nearly 10,000 American troops after the Armistice.

After her Navy service ended in 1919, she was returned to her original owners, who, at least once, chartered her to another shipping company. In May 1922, Iowan rammed and sank the Furness-Prince Line steamer Welsh Prince in the Columbia River near Astoria, Oregon, killing seven men in the process. In June 1941, Iowan ran aground on a reef near Point Conception, California, and suffered $500,000 in damages while buffeted by waves on the reef. She was freed from the reef after two weeks, towed to Los Angeles, and repaired.

In 1942, the ship was requisitioned by the War Shipping Administration, which transferred her to the Soviet Union under the terms of Lend-Lease in December 1942. She was assigned to the Far East Shipping Company under her new name of SS Tashkent, but sailed with the Soviet Pacific Fleet throughout the war. She delivered cargo and troops in support of the Soviet invasion of Japanese-held territories in August 1945. After the war, the ship remained part of the Soviet merchant fleet until 1966. She was transferred to North Korea at that time to become a fish processing facility, and was scrapped in 1969.

== Design and construction ==
In May 1912, the American-Hawaiian Steamship Company placed an order with the Maryland Steel Company of Sparrows Point, Maryland, for two new cargo ships—Iowan and Ohioan. (Note: Maryland Steel had built three ships—Kentuckian, Georgian, and Honolulan—for American-Hawaiian in 1909 in what proved to be a satisfactory arrangement for both companies. In September 1911 and November 1912, American-Hawaiian placed an order for Iowan's six older sister ships; Minnesotan, Dakotan, Montanan, and Pennsylvanian in the earlier order, Washingtonian and Panaman in the latter.) The contract cost of the ships was set at the construction cost plus an 8% profit for Maryland Steel, but with a maximum cost of $640,000 per ship. The construction was financed by Maryland Steel with a credit plan that called for a 5% down payment in cash with nine monthly installments for the balance. Provisions of the deal allowed that some of the nine installments could be converted into longer-term notes or mortgages. The final cost of Iowan, including financing costs, was $71.95 per deadweight ton, which came out to just over $732,000.

Iowan (Maryland Steel yard no. 132) was the first ship built under the contract. She was launched on 24 January 1914, and delivered to American-Hawaiian on 16 May. The ship was 6,529 gross register tons (GRT), and was 407 feet 7 inches (124.23 m) in length (between perpendiculars) and 53 feet 6 inches (16.31 m) abeam. She had a deadweight tonnage of 10,175 LT DWT, and her cargo holds, which had a storage capacity of 490,859 cubic feet (13,899.6 m^{3}), were outfitted with a complete refrigeration plant so that she could carry perishable products from the West Coast—like fresh produce from Southern California farms—to the East Coast. Iowan had a single steam engine powered by oil-fired boilers that drove a single screw propeller at a speed of 14 knots (26 km/h).

== Early career ==
When Iowan began sailing for American-Hawaiian, the company shipped cargo from East Coast ports via the Straits of Magellan to West Coast ports and Hawaii, and vice versa. (Note: Prior to the 21 April 1914 United States occupation of Veracruz, American-Hawaiian had used the Tehuantepec Route, but after the U.S. action, that route was closed by the Huerta-led Mexican government. Shipments on that Tehuantepec Route would arrive at Mexican ports—Salina Cruz, Oaxaca, for eastbound cargo, and Coatzacoalcos, Veracruz, for westbound cargo—and would traverse the Isthmus of Tehuantepec on the Tehuantepec National Railway. See: Hovey, p. 78.) Eastbound shipments were primarily sugar and pineapple from Hawaii, while westbound cargoes were more general in nature. With the opening of the Panama Canal on 15 August 1914, American-Hawaiian ships switched to taking that route.

At 15:20 on 15 October 1914, the outbound Iowan rammed the United Fruit Company passenger and cargo steamer Metapan at the entrance of Ambrose Channel outside New York. Metapan had stopped in the dense fog, but Iowan was traveling at a rapid pace. When Iowan had appeared out of the fog some 200 to 300 yards (180 to 270 m) from Metapan, the United Fruit ship sounded three blasts on the ship's whistle—warning Iowan of the impending collision. Iowan's captain did not alter the ship's course, but did drop her anchor to try to slow the fully laden ship. Nevertheless, Iowan gashed the bow of Metapan and traveled almost halfway through the passenger ship. When Iowan pulled out three minutes later, Metapan began to sink rapidly. Metapan's captain ordered his ship to sail at full speed for shoals some 200 yards (180 m) distant, on which the ship grounded in 18 feet (5.5 m) of water. A variety of craft—including the nearby British Royal Navy cruiser Lancaster—responded to Metapan's SOS. Even though the ship was resting on the bottom and the passengers in no immediate danger, most of the 78 passengers and 90 crewmen evacuated the ship in lifeboats and were picked up by rescue craft. (Note: Metapan had been carrying $500,000 in gold bars from Colombia and was also transporting James Campbell Besley's scientific expedition returning from Peru with two Incan mummies, Incan jewelry and other artifacts, and 10,000 feet (3,000 m) of motion pictures documenting their finds. See: "Liner Metapan sunk in harbor crash; 168 saved" (PDF). The New York Times. 16 October 1914. pp. 1, 7. Metapan was raised and repaired, but sank again, this time permanently, when she struck a mine off North Africa during World War II. See: Mann, Raymond A. (15 February 2006). "Bernadou". Dictionary of American Naval Fighting Ships. Navy Department, Naval History and Heritage Command.) Iowan, which suffered no casualties among her crew, attempted to return to her pier in Brooklyn, but was unable and instead anchored in Ambrose Channel. Iowan's damage was restricted to her bow, which was crushed above the waterline. Two days later, The Wall Street Journal reported that Iowan was anchored off Clifton, Staten Island, and awaiting inspection from surveyors.

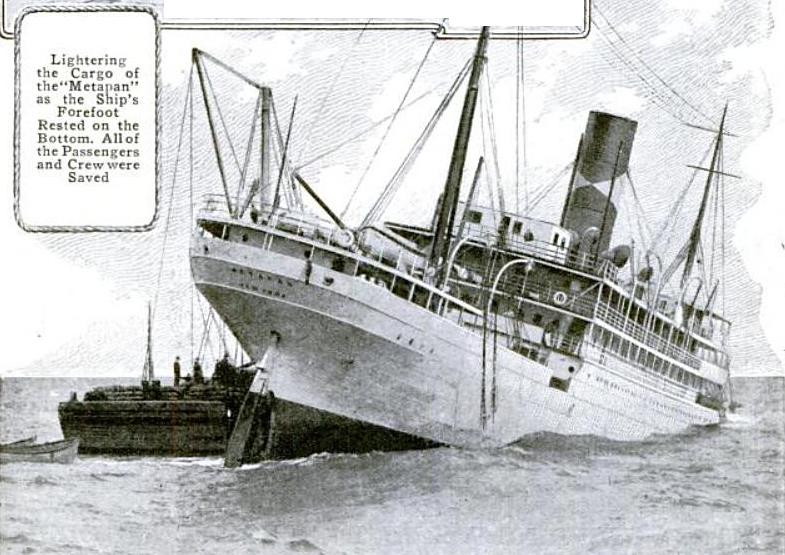
SS Metapan sinking after being rammed by Iowan in 1914

After repairs and return to service, Iowan resumed her inter-coastal service. In May 1915, she was delayed by a large Pacific storm that was responsible for the sinking of the steamer Victoria, and also damaged Northern Pacific and Harvard. In mid-September the same year, Iowan sailed from Boston for the West Coast. She arrived at Cristóbal, the Atlantic terminus of the Panama Canal, to find the canal closed by a major landslide—more than 1,000,000 cubic yards (760,000 m^{3}) of mud and dirt had collapsed into the Gaillard Cut. Initially, American-Hawaiian had Iowan wait in case the canal would soon reopen, but when it became apparent that the closure would last some time, perhaps as long as ten months, (Note: The canal finally reopened to shipping traffic on 15 April 1916. See: "Panama Canal opens to ship traffic again". The Christian Science Monitor. 15 April 1916. p. 18.) Iowan was sent around South America to her destinations, Los Angeles and San Francisco. The Los Angeles Times reported that one portion of Iowan's delayed cargo consisted of Christmas toys for Los Angeles merchants. The newspaper went on to predict that the delay would be "very disastrous" for the holiday season.

The balance of Iowan's activities over the next two years are unclear. She may have been in the half of the American-Hawaiian fleet that was chartered for transatlantic service. She may also have been in the group of American-Hawaiian ships chartered for service to South America, delivering coal, gasoline, and steel in exchange for coffee, nitrates, cocoa, rubber, and manganese ore.

== World War I ==
On 23 December 1917, some seven months after the United States declared war on Germany, the United States Navy acquired Iowan from American-Hawaiian. USS Iowan was commissioned the same day.

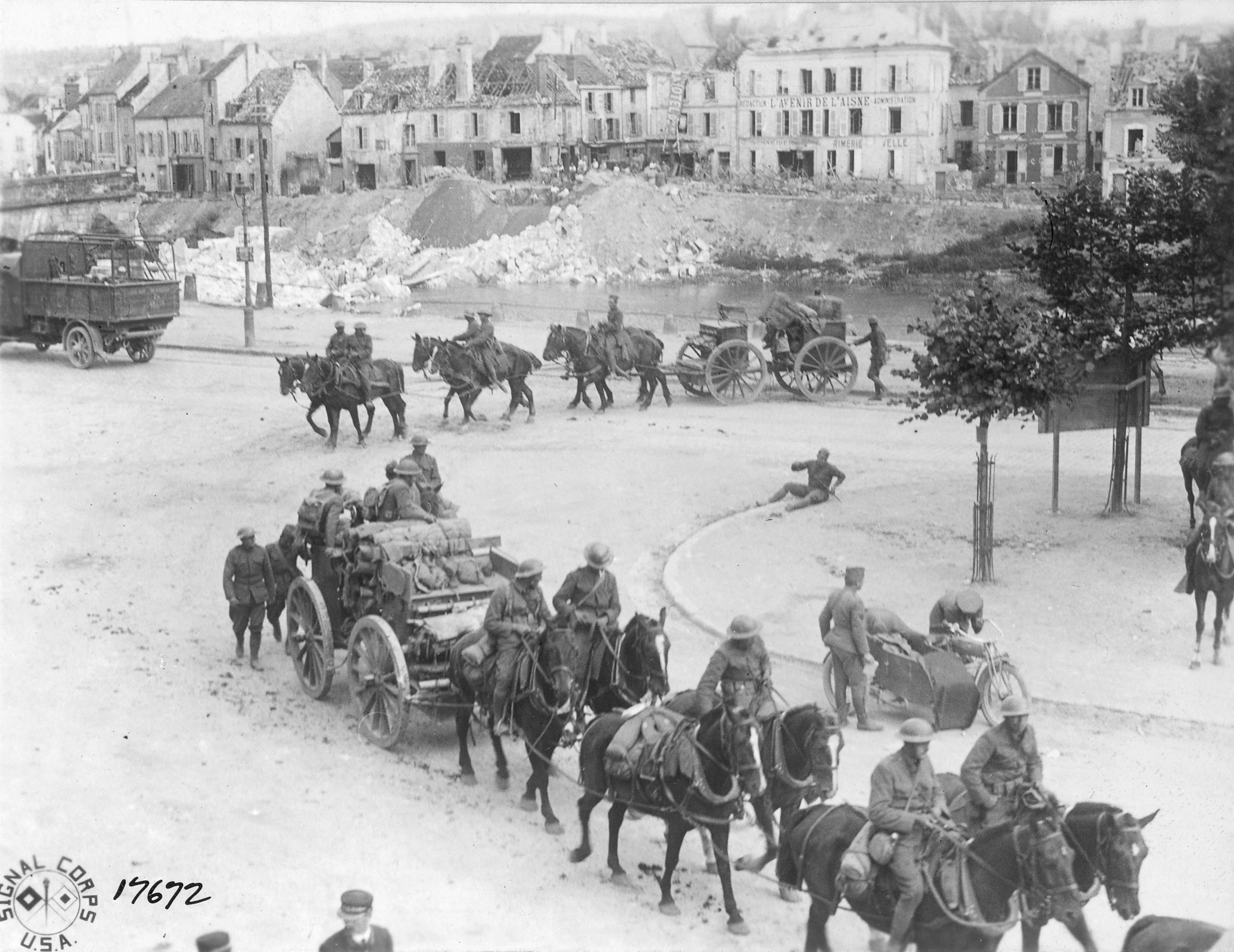
In her U.S. Navy service during World War I, Iowan transported horses for use by the American Expeditionary Force, like these seen here with a U.S. field artillery unit at Château-Thierry.

Iowan loaded a cargo of 800 horses, along with flour, iron, and machinery at Newport News, Virginia and sailed for New York on 9 February 1918. There she joined a convoy that sailed for France on 11 February and arrived at its destination on 28 February; Iowan discharged her equine passengers—less seven that died or were destroyed during the voyage—at Remount Depot No. 3 on 5 March. Iowan continued carrying livestock and food products to France through the rest of the war. On 9 November, Iowan took on 72 officers and men, and headed for France with cargo ship Charlton Hall two days before the Armistice.

With the fighting at an end, the task of bringing home American soldiers began almost immediately. Iowan was selected for conversion to a troop transport and transferred to the Cruiser and Transport Force, but before she could begin returning troops, Iowan had to undergo conversion from a cargo and animal ship. Though sources do not indicate the specific modifications Iowan underwent, typical conversions for other ships included the installation of berths for troops, and adding greatly expanded cooking and toilet facilities to handle the large numbers of men aboard. Similar modifications on Iowan's sister ship Minnesotan took three months, but it is not known how long Iowan's refit took. By the time Iowan had completed her sixth and final trooping voyage on 29 August 1919, Iowan had carried home 9,876 healthy and wounded men. USS Iowan was decommissioned on 22 September 1919, and returned to American-Hawaiian.

== Interwar years ==
Iowan resumed cargo service with American-Hawaiian after her return from World War I service. Though the company had abandoned its original Hawaiian sugar routes by this time, Iowan continued inter-coastal service through the Panama Canal. For a time in the early 1920s, Iowan was chartered to the United American Line. In May 1922, the Associated Press reported that Iowan, sailing under the United American banner, was loading wheat, flour, and lumber at Tacoma, Washington, for England and European ports. Later that same month, on 29 May, Iowan rammed and sank the Furness-Prince Line cargo ship Welsh Prince in the Columbia River near Astoria, Oregon. Seven men aboard Welsh Prince were killed and three were injured in the crash and subsequent fire.

On 11 June 1941, Iowan departed Los Angeles with a cargo of 4,500 long tons (4,600 t) of steel and iron pipe destined for San Francisco; Portland, Oregon; and Seattle, on her last voyage before she was to be handed over to the United States Maritime Commission. At 04:20 on 12 June, Iowan ran aground on a reef a few hundred yards (meters) off shore from Government Point,—117 nautical miles (217 km) northwest of Los Angeles,—near Point Conception. Salvage operations took some two weeks, but the ship was towed back to Los Angeles and placed in drydock at the Bethlehem Shipyard on Terminal Island. Approximately 100 feet (30 m) of the ship's hull had been damaged while the ship was buffeted by waves on the reef, which had opened numerous holes in her hull. The ship's drive shaft had broken, and her boilers and engines had shifted. The Los Angeles Times reported that estimates for Iowan's repair ranged up to $500,000. In an inquiry held by the Bureau of Marine Inspection and Navigation, Iowan's captain, S. A. Gates, a Californian with 25 years of sailing experience along the coast, blamed unusual tides for the grounding.

== World War II and later career ==
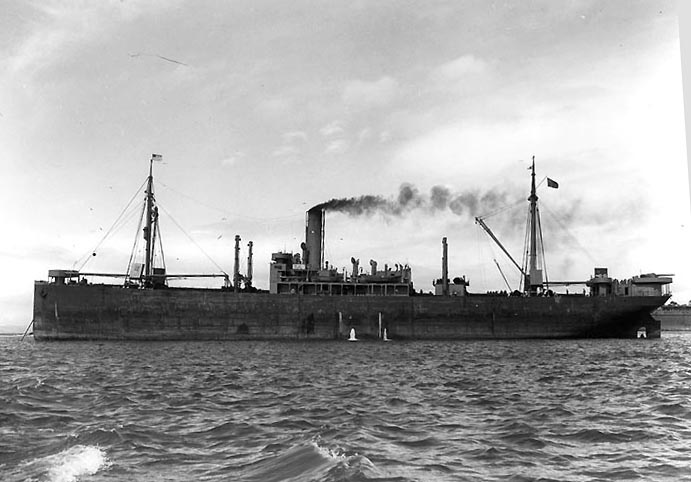
SS Tashkent anchored near San Francisco during World War II.

In 1942, after Iowan was repaired and after the United States had entered World War II, the ship was requisitioned by the War Shipping Administration (WSA). On 6 December 1942, Iowan was transferred to the Soviet Union under Lend-Lease, and renamed Tashkent (Ташкент Russian pronunciation: [tɐʂˈkʲɛnt]) after the capital of Uzbekistan. Near the end of World War II, the WSA offered a payment of $694,743 to American-Hawaiian for the former Iowan as part of a $7.2 million settlement for eleven American-Hawaiian ships that had been requisitioned by the WSA.

Tashkent was assigned to the Far East Shipping Company (FESCO), but sailed with the Pacific Fleet of the Soviet Navy throughout the war. Tashkent was photographed at San Francisco at some point during the war, but most of her other movements are not known. However, in August 1945, Tashkent delivered troops and cargo in support of the Soviet invasions of Japanese-held Manchuria, Korea, Sakhalin, and the Kurile Islands. After the war's end, Tashkent returned to merchant operation with FESCO through 1966, when she was transferred to North Korea for use as a fish processing facility. The former Tashkent was scrapped in 1969.

== Bibliography ==
- Cochran, Thomas C.; Ray Ginger (December 1954). "The American-Hawaiian Steamship Company, 1899–1919". The Business History Review. 28 (4). Boston: The President and Fellows of Harvard College: 343–365. doi:10.2307/3111801. ISSN 0007-6805. JSTOR 3111801. OCLC 216113867. S2CID 154716297.
- Crowell, Benedict; Robert Forrest Wilson (1921). The Road to France: The Transportation of Troops and Military Supplies, 1917–1918. How America Went to War: An Account From Official Sources of the Nation's War Activities, 1917–1920. New Haven: Yale University Press. OCLC 18696066.
- Gleaves, Albert (1921). A History of the Transport Service: Adventures and Experiences of United States Transports and Cruisers in the World War. New York: George H. Doran Company. OCLC 976757.
- Hovey, Edmund Otis (1907). "The Isthmus of Tehuantepec and the Tehuantepec National Railway". Bulletin of the American Geographical Society. 39 (2). New York: American Geographical Society: 78–91. doi:10.2307/198380. ISSN 0190-5929. JSTOR 198380. OCLC 2097765.
- Naval Historical Center. "Iowan". Dictionary of American Naval Fighting Ships. Navy Department, Naval History and Heritage Command.
- Naval Historical Center. "Minnesotan". Dictionary of American Naval Fighting Ships. Navy Department, Naval History & Heritage Command.
