= SS Panaman =

American cargo ship

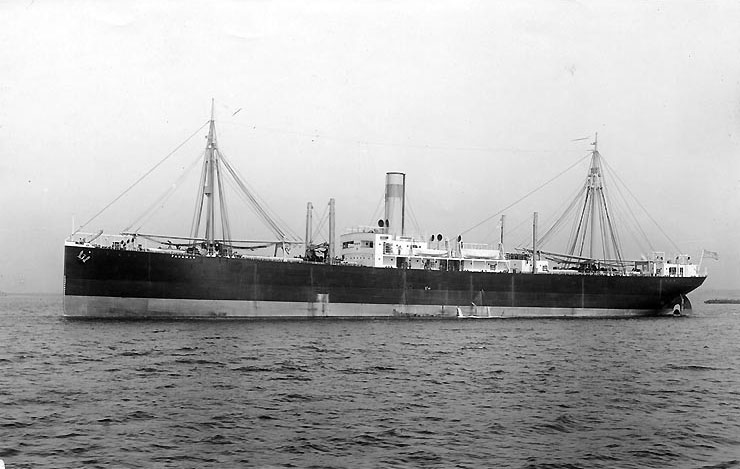
- SS Panaman in 1913 at Baltimore, Maryland

History
- Name: SS Panaman
- Owner: American-Hawaiian Steamship Company
- Ordered: September 1911
- Builder: Maryland Steel; Sparrows Point, Maryland
- Cost: $715,000
- Yard number: 128
- Launched: 28 June 1913
- Completed: September 1913
- Identification: Official number: 211629
- Fate: Chartered by U.S. Army

History

United States
- Name: USAT Panaman
- Fate: Transferred to U.S. Navy, 12 August 1918

History

United States
- Name: USS Panaman (ID-3299)
- Acquired: 12 August 1918
- Commissioned: 12 August 1918
- Decommissioned: 18 September 1919
- Fate: Returned to American-Hawaiian

History
- Name: 1919–1947: SS Panaman; 1947–1954: SS Marcella
- Owner: 1919–1947: American-Hawaiian Steamship Co.; 1947–1954: Italian government
- Port of registry: 1919–1949: United States; 1949–1952: Italy
- Fate: Scrapped at Baltimore, 15 September 1954

General characteristics
- Type: Cargo ship
- Tonnage: 6,535 GRT 10,175 LT DWT
- Length: 407 ft 7 in (124.23 m) (LPP); 429 ft 2 in (130.81 m) (overall)
- Beam: 53 ft 8 in (16.36 m)
- Draft: 29 ft 6 in (8.99 m)
- Installed power: 4,000 ihp (2,983 kW)
- Propulsion: 3 × oil-fired single-ended boilers; 1 × quadruple-expansion steam engine; 1 × screw propeller
- Speed: 12 knots (22 km/h)
- Capacity: Cargo: 492,255 cubic feet (13,939.1 m^{3})
- Crew: 18 officers, 40 crewmen
- Notes: Sister ships: Dakotan, Montanan, Pennsylvanian, Minnesotan, Washingtonian, Iowan, Ohioan

General characteristics (as USS Panaman)
- Displacement: 14,495 t
- Complement: 70
- Armament: 1 × 5-inch (130 mm) gun; 1 × 3-inch (76 mm) gun

SS Panaman was a cargo ship built in 1913 for the American-Hawaiian Steamship Company. The ship was sometimes incorrectly referred to as SS Panamanian. During World War I she was known as USAT Panaman in service for the United States Army and USS Panaman (ID-3299) in service for the United States Navy. Late in her career she was known as SS Marcella for the Italian government.

She was built by the Maryland Steel Company as one of eight sister ships for the American-Hawaiian Steamship Company. She was employed in inter-coastal service via the Isthmus of Tehuantepec and the Panama Canal after it opened. In World War I, USAT Panaman carried cargo and animals to France under charter to the U.S. Army. When transferred to the U.S. Navy in August 1918, USS Panaman continued in the same duties, but after the Armistice, it was converted to a troop transport and returned over 11,000 American troops from France. Returned to American-Hawaiian in 1919, Panaman resumed inter-coastal cargo service.

During World War II, Panaman was requisitioned by the War Shipping Administration and initially sailed between New York and Caribbean ports, but with two trips to African ports mixed in. Beginning in mid 1943, Panaman sailed from New York or Boston to ports in the United Kingdom. In late 1946, she was sailing in the Pacific Ocean. In July 1947, American-Hawaiian sold Panaman to the Italian government. Renamed Marcella at that time, she was scrapped in September 1954 at Baltimore.

== Design and construction ==
In November 1911, the American-Hawaiian Steamship Company placed an order with the Maryland Steel Company of Sparrows Point, Maryland, for two new cargo ships—Panaman and Washingtonian. (Note: Maryland Steel had built three ships—Kentuckian, Georgian, and Honolulan—for American-Hawaiian in 1909 in what proved to be a satisfactory arrangement for both companies, and in September 1911, American-Hawaiian placed an order for Panaman's four older sister ships—Minnesotan, Dakotan, Montanan, and Pennsylvanian.) The contract cost of the ships was set at the construction cost plus an 8% profit for Maryland Steel, but with a maximum cost of $640,000 each. The construction was financed by Maryland Steel with a credit plan that called for a 5% down payment in cash with nine monthly installments for the balance. Provisions of the deal allowed that some of the nine installments could be converted into longer-term notes or mortgages. The final cost of Panaman, including financing costs, was $70.29 per deadweight ton, which came out to just over $715,000.

Panaman (Maryland Steel yard no. 128) was the first ship built under the contract. The ship was 6,535 gross register tons (GRT), and was 407 feet 7 inches (124.23 m) in length (between perpendiculars) and 53 feet 8 inches (16.36 m) abeam. She had a deadweight tonnage of 10,175 LT DWT, and her cargo holds, which had a storage capacity of 492,255 cubic feet (13,939.1 m^{3}), were outfitted with a complete refrigeration plant so that she could carry perishable products from the West Coast—like fresh produce from Southern California farms—to the East Coast. Panaman had a single steam engine powered by oil-fired boilers that drove a single screw propeller at a speed of 12 knots (22 km/h).

== Early career ==
When Panaman began sailing for American-Hawaiian, the company shipped cargo from East Coast ports via the Tehuantepec Route to West Coast ports and Hawaii, and vice versa. Shipments on the Tehuantepec Route would arrive at Mexican ports—Salina Cruz, Oaxaca, for eastbound cargo, and Coatzacoalcos, Veracruz, for westbound cargo—and would traverse the Isthmus of Tehuantepec on the Tehuantepec National Railway. Eastbound shipments were primarily sugar and pineapple from Hawaii, while westbound cargoes were more general in nature. Panaman sailed in this service on the west side of North America.

After the United States occupation of Veracruz on 21 April 1914 (which found six American-Hawaiian ships in Mexican ports), the Huerta-led Mexican government closed the Tehuantepec National Railway to American shipping. This loss of access coupled with the fact that the Panama Canal was not yet open, caused American-Hawaiian to return in late April to its historic route of sailing around South America via the Straits of Magellan. With the opening of the Panama Canal on 15 August, American-Hawaiian ships switched to taking that route.

Workers fill sugar sacks in Hawaii in the 1910s. Panaman was built for American-Hawaiian, in part, for the Hawaiian sugar trade.

In October 1915, landslides closed the Panama Canal and all American-Hawaiian ships, including Panaman, returned to the Straits of Magellan route again. Panaman's exact movements from this time through early 1917 are unclear. She may have been in the half of the American-Hawaiian fleet that was chartered for transatlantic service. She may also have been in the group of American-Hawaiian ships chartered for service to South America, delivering coal, gasoline, and steel in exchange for coffee, nitrates, cocoa, rubber, and manganese ore.

== World War I ==
At some point after the United States declared war on Germany, the United States Army chartered Panaman for transporting pack animals to Europe in support of the American Expeditionary Force. Although there is no information about the specific conversion of Panaman, for other ships this typically meant that passenger accommodations had to be ripped out and replaced with ramps and stalls for the horses and mules carried. Details about Panaman's first two animal transport journeys are not known, but her third trip began 1 April 1918 when she sailed from Newport News, Virginia, with 180 animals for Saint-Nazaire. All 180 animals arrived in good health; none had died, fallen ill, or been injured during the trip. Further details of Panaman's Army service are not known.

On 12 August, Panaman was transferred to the United States Navy at New York, and was commissioned into the Naval Overseas Transportation Service (NOTS) the same day. Panaman was loaded with a cargo of general supplies, beef, and a deck-load of trucks and sailed in a convoy from New York on 21 September, arriving at its destination of Saint-Nazaire 6 days later. Back in New York on 7 October, Panaman was outfitted with 821 stalls for horses, and took on a load of horses, general cargo, and 78 officers and men. Sailing in her next convoy on 19 October, she reached Bordeaux on 6 November, five days before the Armistice. After sailing from France on 16 November, she arrived at Newport News eleven days later and underwent repairs.

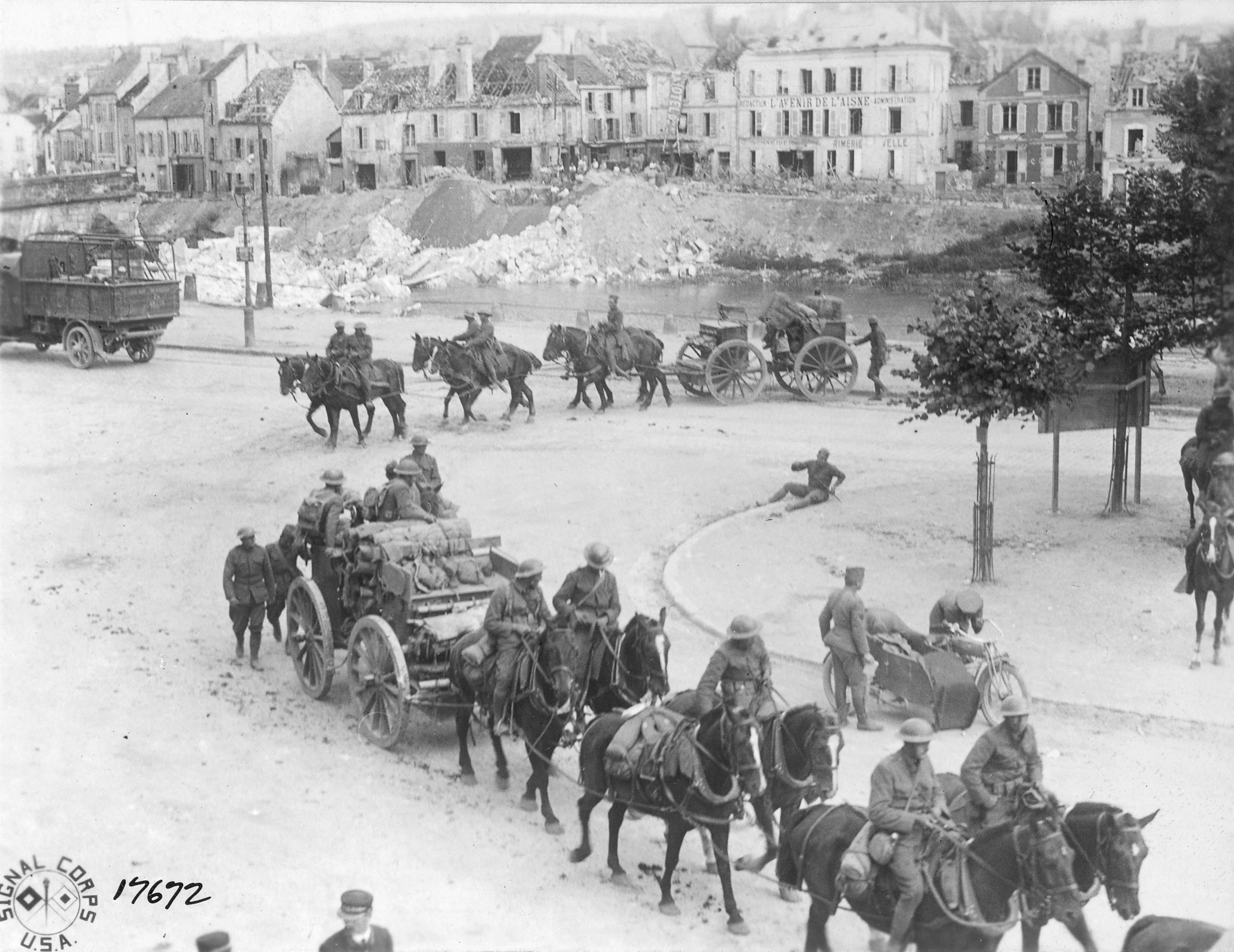
In her U.S. Army service during World War I, Panaman transported horses for use by the American Expeditionary Force, like these seen here with a U.S. field artillery unit at Château-Thierry.

Panaman sailed on 8 December for New York, where the Board of Survey found her fit for conversion to a troop transport and transferred her from the (NOTS) to the Cruiser and Transport Force. Though sources do not indicate the specific modifications Panaman underwent, typical conversions for other ships included the installation of berths for troops, and adding greatly expanded cooking and toilet facilities to handle the large numbers of men aboard. Similar modifications on Panaman's sister ship Minnesotan took three months, but it is not known how long Panaman's refit took. After her conversion, she made six roundtrip voyages to France and brought home 11,393 American personnel. USS Panaman was decommissioned on 18 September 1919, and returned to American-Hawaiian the same day.

== Interwar years ==
Panaman resumed cargo service with American-Hawaiian after her return from World War I service. Though the company had abandoned its original Hawaiian sugar routes by this time, Panaman continued inter-coastal service through the Panama Canal in a relatively uneventful career. Hints at cargos she carried during this time can be gleaned from contemporary news reports from the Los Angeles Times. In April 1923, for example, the newspaper ran a report provided by the Los Angeles Chamber of Commerce that went into great detail listing the contents of the 2,651,042-pound (1,202,492 kg) cargo that Panaman had unloaded. The items included items such as 90,372 pounds (40,992 kg) of iron conduit pipe, 73,486 pounds (33,333 kg) of paper towels and toilet tissue, and 40,873 pounds (18,540 kg) of canned hominy. In June 1926, the newspaper ran a photograph that showed the loading of a $1,000 prize bull that was beginning its journey from Los Angeles Harbor to Guatemala City aboard Panaman.

In 1940, Panaman made the news when eleven crewmen mutinied, according to the ship's captain. The ship was held up in San Diego for 18 hours because the men refused to obey the captain's orders. When an agreement brokered by Harry Lundeberg of the Sailors' Union of the Pacific was reached, the men followed orders to get the ship to Los Angeles where the union would attempt to settle the issue. But on arrival in Los Angeles Harbor, the ship was boarded by three FBI agents and two representatives of the Bureau of Marine Inspection and Navigation. After interviewing the captain behind closed doors aboard the ship, the FBI turned the investigation over to the Bureau of Marine Inspection and Navigation, whose two investigators conducted a hearing for the eleven men.

== World War II ==
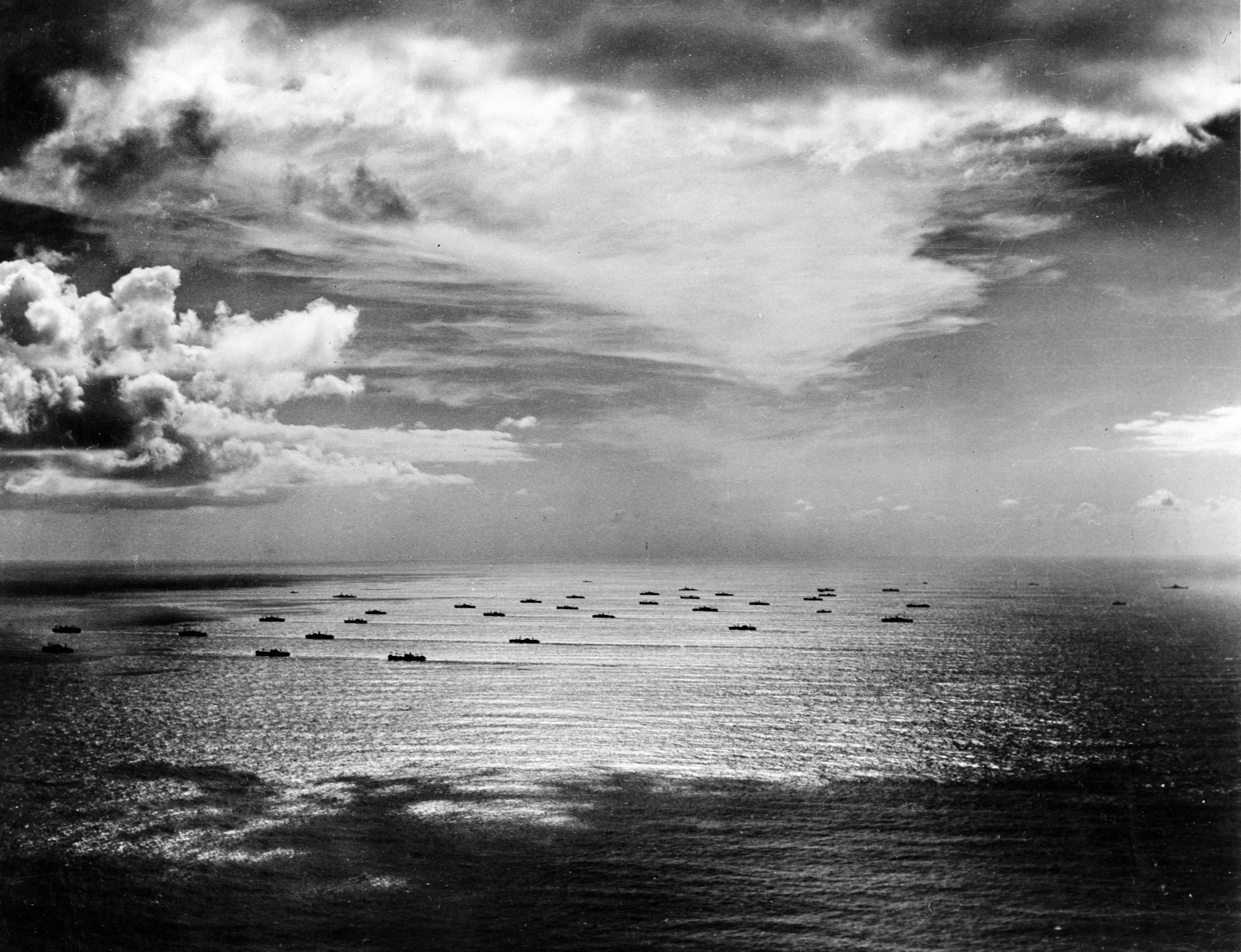
SS Panaman sailed in several transatlantic convoys, like this typical one, seen in 1942.

After the United States entered World War II, Panaman was requisitioned by the War Shipping Administration and frequently sailed in convoys. Though complete records of her sailings are unavailable, partial records indicate some of the ports that Panaman visited during the conflict and some of the cargo. From August 1942 to April 1943, Panaman sailed primarily between New York and Caribbean ports, calling at Trinidad, Key West, Hampton Roads, and Guantánamo Bay. One exception to this pattern was in November 1942 when Panaman sailed on one roundtrip to Durban, South Africa, returning by way of Bahia.

In late April 1943, Panaman sailed from Hampton Roads to Algiers and back, returning to the former in late June. Beginning in July, Panaman sailed from either Boston or New York to Halifax and Liverpool for some eight round trips between then and October 1944. Panaman also visited Belfast Lough in March 1944, Falmouth and Seine Bay in June, and Southampton and Belfast Lough again in July. In October, Panaman sailed from New York to Guantánamo Bay. According to personal letters sent from the Philippines by a crewman to family members, "Panaman" served in the Pacific Theater in the summer of 1945.

== Later career ==
After the war's end, American-Hawaiian continued operating Panaman for about two more years. In December 1946, the Chicago Daily Tribune reported that Panaman was speeding to Manila with two men ill with polio. The news article reported that the ship had one man die in Saigon from the disease two months prior. In July the following year, the company sold the Panaman to the Italian government. The ship operated under her new name of Marcella and remained in Italian hands until she was scrapped on 15 September 1954 at Baltimore.

== Bibliography ==
- Cochran, Thomas C.; Ray Ginger (December 1954). "The American-Hawaiian Steamship Company, 1899–1919". The Business History Review. 28 (4). Boston: The President and Fellows of Harvard College: 343–365. doi:10.2307/3111801. ISSN 0007-6805. JSTOR 3111801. OCLC 216113867.
- Crowell, Benedict; Robert Forrest Wilson (1921). The Road to France: The Transportation of Troops and Military Supplies, 1917–1918. How America Went to War: An Account From Official Sources of the Nation's War Activities, 1917–1920. New Haven: Yale University Press. OCLC 18696066.
- Gleaves, Albert (1921). A History of the Transport Service: Adventures and Experiences of United States Transports and Cruisers in the World War. New York: George H. Doran Company. OCLC 976757.
- Hovey, Edmund Otis (1907). "The Isthmus of Tehuantepec and the Tehuantepec National Railway". Bulletin of the American Geographical Society. 39 (2). New York: American Geographical Society: 78–91. doi:10.2307/198380. ISSN 0190-5929. JSTOR 198380. OCLC 2097765.
- Naval Historical Center. "Minnesotan". Dictionary of American Naval Fighting Ships. Navy Department, Naval History and Heritage Command.
- Naval Historical Center. "Panaman". Dictionary of American Naval Fighting Ships. Navy Department, Naval History & Heritage Command.
