= SS Pennsylvanian =

1913 cargo ship

Coordinates: 49°22′29″N 0°53′31″W

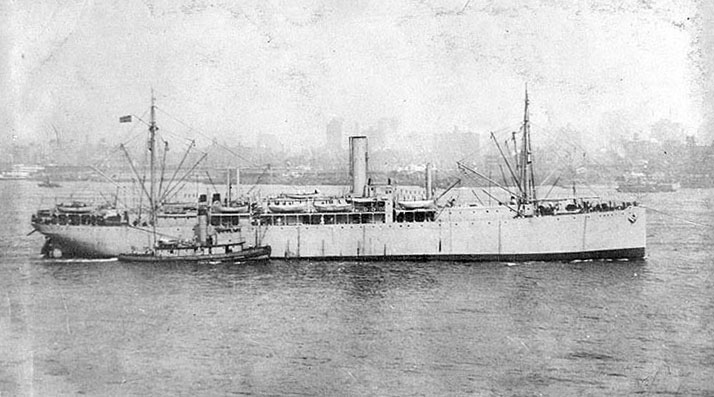
- SS Pennsylvanian, seen here as USS Scranton (ID-3511) in 1919

History
- Name: SS Pennsylvanian
- Owner: American-Hawaiian Steamship Company
- Port of registry: (United States) New York
- Ordered: September 1911
- Builder: Maryland Steel; Sparrows Point, Maryland
- Cost: $715,000
- Yard number: 127
- Launched: 29 March 1913
- Completed: June 1913
- Identification: US Official number: 211297; Code Letters LDBH
- Fate: Expropriated by U.S. Navy

History

United States
- Name: USS Pennsylvanian (ID-3511)
- Acquired: 13 September 1918
- Commissioned: 13 September 1918
- Renamed: USS Scranton (ID-3511), November 1918
- Namesake: Scranton, Pennsylvania
- Decommissioned: 16 July 1919
- Fate: Returned to American-Hawaiian Steamship Co., 16 July 1919

History
- Name: SS Pennsylvanian
- Owner: American-Hawaiian Steamship Company
- Port of registry: (United States) New York
- Identification: US Official number: 211297; Code Letters LDBH (1919–34); Code Letters WACT (1934–44)
- Fate: Expropriated by U.S. Navy; sunk as part of Mulberry Harbor off Normandy, 16 July 1944

General characteristics
- Type: Cargo ship
- Tonnage: 6,547 GRT 10,175 LT DWT 4,068 NRT
- Length: 407 ft 10 in (124.31 m) (LPP); 429 ft 2 in (130.81 m) (overall)
- Beam: 53 ft 6 in (16.31 m)
- Draft: 29 ft 6 in (8.99 m)
- Propulsion: oil-fired boilers; single quadruple-expansion steam engine; single screw propeller
- Speed: 15 knots (28 km/h)
- Capacity: 491,084 cubic feet (13,906.0 m^{3})
- Notes: Sister ships: Minnesotan, Dakotan, Montanan, Panaman, Washingtonian, Iowan, Ohioan

General characteristics (as USS Scranton)
- Displacement: 6,655 long tons (6,762 t)
- Troops: 1,840
- Complement: 94
- Armament: 7 × .50 cal (12.7 mm) machine guns

SS Pennsylvanian was a cargo ship built in 1913 for the American-Hawaiian Steamship Company. During World War I she was requisitioned by the United States Navy and commissioned as USS Pennsylvanian (ID-3511) in September 1918, and renamed two months later to USS Scranton. After her naval service, her original name of Pennsylvanian was restored.

Pennsylvanian was built by the Maryland Steel Company as one of eight sister ships for the American-Hawaiian Steamship Company, and was employed in inter-coastal service via the Isthmus of Tehuantepec and the Panama Canal after it opened. Pennsylvanian was one of the first two steamships to travel eastbound through the canal when it opened in August 1914. During World War I, as both SS Pennsylvanian and USS Scranton, the ship carried cargo and animals to France, and returned American troops after the Armistice in 1918.

After her naval service ended in 1919, she was returned to her original owners and resumed relatively uneventful cargo service over the next twenty years. Early in World War II, the ship was requisitioned by the War Shipping Administration, and shipped cargo on New York – Caribbean routes and transatlantic routes. In mid-July 1944, Pennsylvanian was scuttled as part of the breakwater for one of the Mulberry artificial harbors built to support the Normandy Invasion.

== Design and construction ==
In September 1911, the American-Hawaiian Steamship Company placed an order with the Maryland Steel Company of Sparrows Point, Maryland, for four new cargo ships—Minnesotan, Dakotan, Montanan, and Pennsylvanian. (Note: Maryland Steel had built three ships—Kentuckian, Georgian, and Honolulan—for American-Hawaiian in 1909 in what proved to be a satisfactory arrangement for both companies.) The contract cost of the ships was set at the construction cost plus an 8% profit for Maryland Steel, with a maximum cost of $640,000 each. The construction was financed by Maryland Steel with a credit plan that called for a 5% down payment in cash with nine monthly installments for the balance. Provisions of the deal allowed that some of the nine installments could be converted into longer-term notes or mortgages. The final cost of Pennsylvanian, including financing costs, was $70.35 per deadweight ton, which came out to just under $716,000.

Pennsylvanian (Maryland Steel yard no. 127) was the final ship built under the original contract. (Note: Further contracts on similar terms were signed in November 1911 and May 1912 to build four additional ships: Panaman, Washingtonian, Iowan, Ohioan. See: Cochran and Ginger, p. 358, and Colton.) She was launched on 29 March 1913, and delivered to American-Hawaiian in June. Pennsylvanian was 6,547 gross register tons (GRT), and was 429 feet 2 inches (130.81 m) in length and 53 feet 6 inches (16.31 m) abeam. She had a deadweight tonnage of 10,175 LT DWT and a storage capacity of 491,084 cubic feet (13,906.0 m^{3}). Pennsylvanian had a single quadruple expansion steam engine powered by oil-fired boilers that drove a single screw propeller. It could propel the ship at a speed of 15 knots (28 km/h). The engine had cylinders of 25½ inches (65 cm), 37 inches (94 cm), 53½ inches (136 cm) and 78 inches (200 cm) diameter by 54 inches (140 cm) stroke. It was built by the Maryland Steel Company, Sparrows Point, Maryland.

== Early career ==
When Pennsylvanian began sailing for American-Hawaiian, the company shipped cargo from East Coast ports via the Tehuantepec Route to West Coast ports and Hawaii, and vice versa. Shipments on the Tehuantepec Route would arrive at Mexican ports—Salina Cruz, Oaxaca, for eastbound cargo, and Coatzacoalcos for westbound cargo—and would traverse the Isthmus of Tehuantepec on the Tehuantepec National Railway. Eastbound shipments were primarily sugar and pineapple from Hawaii, while westbound cargoes were more general in nature. Pennsylvanian sailed in this service on the west side of North America.

After the United States occupation of Veracruz on 21 April 1914 (which found six American-Hawaiian ships in Mexican ports), the Huerta-led Mexican government closed the Tehuantepec National Railway to American shipping. This loss of access, coupled with the fact that the Panama Canal was not yet open, caused American-Hawaii to return in late April to its historic route of sailing around South America via the Straits of Magellan. With the opening of the Panama Canal on 15 August, American-Hawaiian ships switched to taking that route. Pennsylvanian, on the west side of the canal when it opened, was one of the first two eastbound steamers to traverse the canal during her trip to New York. (Note: Though the canal transit was part of an eastbound journey, the actual compass heading of the passage through the canal is actually closer to north.) (Note: The Luckenbach Line ship Pleiades was the other steamship to make the eastbound transit of the canal at the same time. Contemporary sources refer to the pair as the first two, making no distinction between which was first. See: Barrett, John (20 August 1914). "Greet first canal ships" (PDF). The New York Times. p. 7. Also see: "All astounded by war news". Los Angeles Times. 15 August 1914. p. II– 8.) In late August, American-Hawaiian announced that Pennsylvanian would sail on a San Francisco – Panama Canal – Boston route, sailing opposite of Mexican, Honolulan, and sister ship Washingtonian. When landslides closed the canal in October 1915, all American-Hawaiian ships, including Pennsylvanian, returned to the Straits of Magellan route again.

Pennsylvanian's exact movements during 1916 and 1917 are unclear. She may have been in the half of the American-Hawaiian fleet that was chartered for transatlantic service. She may also have been in the group of American-Hawaiian ships chartered for service to South America, delivering coal, gasoline, and steel in exchange for coffee, nitrates, cocoa, rubber, and manganese ore. However, when the United States entered World War I in April 1917, the entire American-Hawaiian fleet, including Pennsylvanian, was requisitioned by the United States Shipping Board (USSB), which then returned the ships for operation by American-Hawaiian.

== U.S. Navy service ==
On 13 September 1918, Pennsylvanian was transferred to the U.S. Navy at New York and commissioned USS Pennsylvanian (ID-3511) the same day. Assigned to the Navy's Naval Overseas Transportation Service (NOTS), Pennsylvanian loaded a general cargo and sailed for Brest, France, on 30 September. She arrived there on 15 October and sailed for La Pallice the next day, where she unloaded her cargo before departing for New York on 5 November.

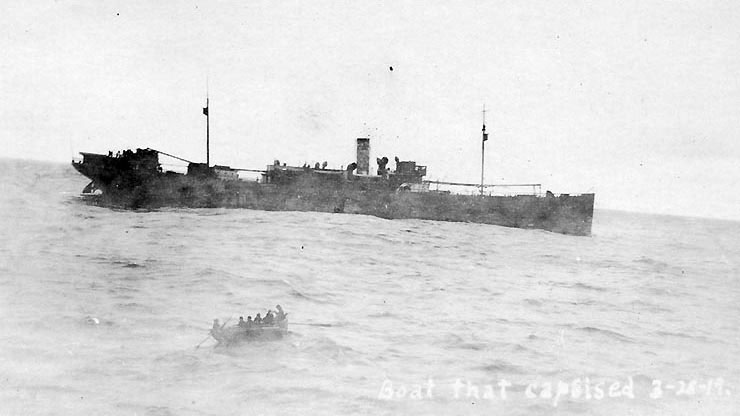
USS El Sol waits for a towline from a launch from Scranton. Three of Scranton's men in the launch died when it capsized after this photograph was taken.

Arriving at New York on 15 November, four days after the Armistice, Pennsylvanian was refitted as an animal transport ship, which, among other things, required the building of ramps and stalls for the animals. Sometime in November, probably during her refit, she was renamed USS Scranton, becoming the first U.S. Navy ship named in honor of the Pennsylvania city. Scranton sailed for France on 12 December, arriving at Saint-Nazaire on 29 December, and returning to New York on 29 January 1919.

On 5 February, Scranton was transferred from the NOTS to the Navy's Cruiser and Transport Force, and began conversion to a troop transport to carry American personnel home from France. While sailing to France to begin her first troop-carrying duties in late March, Scranton suffered damage to her rudder and was disabled 900 nautical miles (1,700 km) east of New York. Navy transport El Sol responded to Scranton's distress call, and attempted to take Scranton under tow. During the day on 28 March, Scranton attempted to run a towline to El Sol by sending a launch in the rolling seas, but it capsized, drowning three men. El Sol stood by Scranton for over 40 hours until minesweeper Penguin arrived and took Scranton under tow. Penguin and Scranton arrived in New York on 3 April, where Scranton entered drydock to undergo repairs.

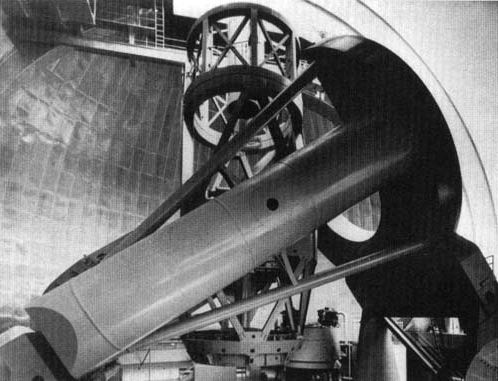
Pennsylvanian delivered 325 tons of steel parts for the Hale Telescope then under construction at Palomar Observatory outside of San Diego.

After repairs, Scranton made three roundtrips to France and carried some 6,000 troops and passengers home to the United States before she was decommissioned on 19 July. The ship was handed over to the USSB for return to American-Hawaiian, who restored her original name.

== Interwar years ==
Pennsylvanian resumed cargo service with American-Hawaiian after her return from World War I service. Though the company had abandoned its original Hawaiian sugar routes by this time, Pennsylvanian continued inter-coastal service through the Panama Canal in a relatively uneventful career. One incident of note occurred on 28 November 1930, when Pennsylvanian hit a Southern Pacific ferry near Goat Island (present-day Yerba Buena Island) in a dense fog in San Francisco Bay. Pennsylvanian hit the stern of the ferry and caused damage to the ferry's superstructure and destroyed about 15 feet (4.6 m) of the ferry's railing. No one on either ship was injured.

Other hints of Pennsylvanian's activities throughout the rest of her career can be found from contemporary newspaper reports. In October 1929, the Los Angeles Times reported on a shipment that included 2,500 to 3,000 radio sets among Pennsylvanian's 2,300 long tons (2,340 t) of cargo. In March 1938, The Christian Science Monitor reported that Pennsylvanian's captain, C. M. Bamforth, had temporarily turned the deck of the cargo ship into a boatyard to build a 15-foot (4.6 m) catboat for his son in Swampscott, Massachusetts. Bamforth laid the keel while in San Francisco, bought copper rivets for the hull planking in Portland, Oregon, and began painting the boat after Pennsylvanian had traversed the Panama Canal. He expected to have the boat finished when Pennsylvanian arrived in Boston on 22 April.

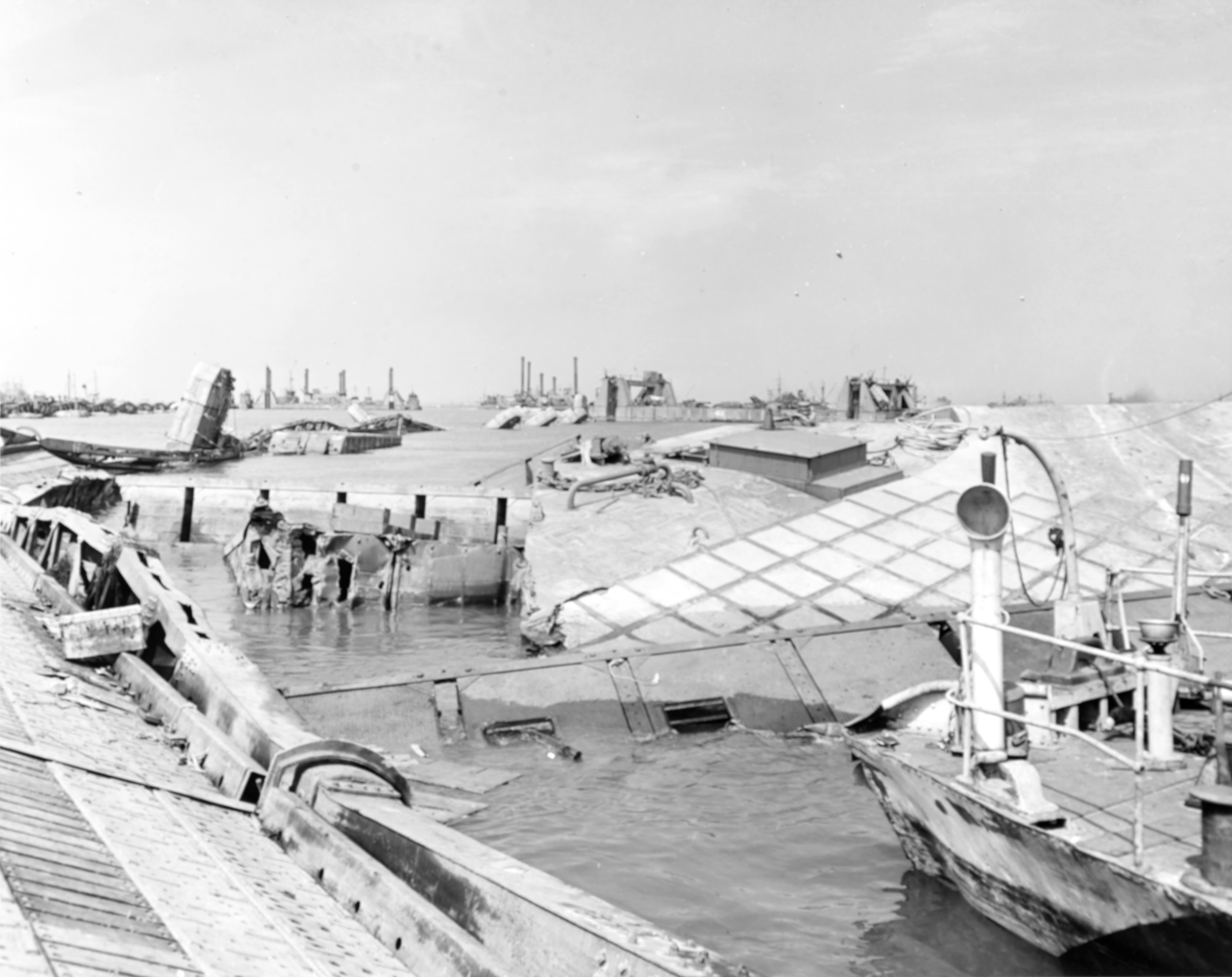
Damage to the Omaha Beach Mulberry harbor from the 19–22 June 1944 storm. SS Pennsylvanian was one of several ships scuttled about a month later to help form a breakwater to shelter the harbor.

In October the same year, Pennsylvanian delivered 325 long tons (330 t) of steel parts for the Hale Telescope then under construction at the Palomar Observatory outside San Diego. The ship had picked up the $375,000 cargo in Philadelphia before sailing for San Diego.

== World War II ==
At some point after the United States entered World War II, Pennsylvanian was requisitioned by the War Shipping Administration (WSA), and, as with her pre-U.S. Navy service in World War I, she continued to be operated by American-Hawaiian. From July to September 1942, Pennsylvanian sailed between New York and Caribbean ports, calling at Trinidad, Key West, Hampton Roads, Guantánamo Bay, and Cristóbal. In January 1943, Pennsylvanian called at Bandar Abbas, Iran, on the Persian Gulf, and returned to Caribbean sailings again by March 1943.

Between May and September 1943, Pennsylvanian made four transatlantic crossings between New York and Liverpool, making intermediate stops in Loch Ewe and Methil while in the United Kingdom. The cargo ship made two New York – Guantánamo Bay roundtrips between September and December before resuming transatlantic sailings. After two New York – Liverpool roundtrips between late December 1943 and April 1944, Pennsylvanian left the United States for the final time on 19 May 1944, arriving in Liverpool on 2 June. She called at the British ports of Methil, Loch Ewe, Clyde, and Milford Haven in late June and early July, and, sailing from Barry in mid July, Pennsylvanian arrived at Saint-Laurent-sur-Mer, France. There she was scuttled as part of the breakwater for the Mulberry artificial harbor built to support the Normandy Invasion. (Note: The Dictionary of American Naval Fighting Ships (DANFS) and Radigan both give the scuttling date as 16 July. Arnold Hague's Ports Database has Pennsylvanian sailing from Clyde on that date, and lists Pennsylvanian's arrival at Seine Bay on 20 July.)

In March 1945, the WSA offered a payment of $565,910 to American-Hawaiian for Pennsylvanian as part of a $7.2 million settlement for eleven requisitioned American-Hawaiian ships that had either been sunk, scuttled, or were to be retained by the government.

== Bibliography ==
- Cochran, Thomas C.; Ray Ginger (December 1954). "The American-Hawaiian Steamship Company, 1899–1919". The Business History Review. 28 (4). Boston: The President and Fellows of Harvard College: 343–365. doi:10.2307/3111801. ISSN 0007-6805. JSTOR 3111801. OCLC 216113867.
- Crowell, Benedict; Robert Forrest Wilson (1921). The Road to France: The Transportation of Troops and Military Supplies, 1917–1918. How America Went to War: An Account From Official Sources of the Nation's War Activities, 1917–1920. New Haven: Yale University Press. OCLC 18696066.
- Hovey, Edmund Otis (1907). "The Isthmus of Tehuantepec and the Tehuantepec National Railway". Bulletin of the American Geographical Society. 39 (2). New York: American Geographical Society: 78–91. doi:10.2307/198380. ISSN 0190-5929. JSTOR 198380. OCLC 2097765.
- Naval History & Heritage Command. "El Sol". Dictionary of American Naval Fighting Ships. Navy Department, Naval History and Heritage Command.
- Naval History & Heritage Command. "Scranton". Dictionary of American Naval Fighting Ships. Navy Department, Naval History & Heritage Command.
- Naval History & Heritage Command (11 July 2004). "USS Scranton (ID # 3511) Photo Album, 1919". Online Library of Selected Images: Photo Albums. Navy Department, Naval Historical Center. Archived from the original on 28 September 2008.
