= SS Minnesotan =

1912 cargo ship

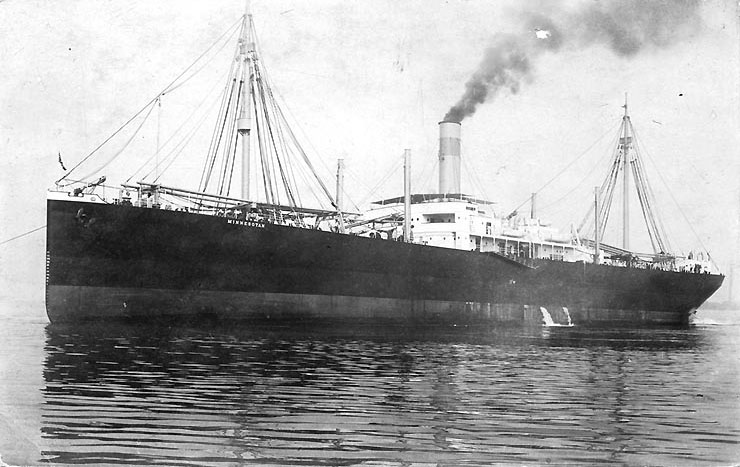
- SS Minnesotan

History
- Name: SS Minnesotan
- Owner: American-Hawaiian Steamship Company
- Ordered: September 1911
- Builder: Maryland Steel; Sparrows Point, Maryland
- Cost: $668,000
- Yard number: 124
- Launched: 8 June 1912
- Sponsored by: Lubelle Shepard
- Completed: September 1912
- Identification: U.S. official number: 210534
- Fate: Expropriated by U.S. Army, 1 June 1917

United States
- Name: USAT Minnesotan
- Acquired: 11 September 1917
- Fate: Transferred to U.S. Navy, 23 August 1918

United States
- Name: USS Minnesotan (ID-4545)
- Acquired: 23 August 1918
- Commissioned: 23 August 1918
- Decommissioned: 21 August 1919
- Fate: Returned to American-Hawaiian
- Name: 1919–49: SS Minnesotan; 1949–52: SS Maria Luisa R.
- Owner: 1919–49: American-Hawaiian Steamship Co.; 1949–52: S.A.R.G.A. SpA
- Port of registry: 1919–49: (United States) New York; 1949–52: Genoa
- Fate: Scrapped at Bari, 1952

General characteristics
- Type: Cargo ship
- Tonnage: 6,617 GRT 10,175 LT DWT
- Length: 407 ft 7 in (124.23 m) (LPP); 429 ft 9 in (130.99 m) (overall)
- Beam: 53 ft 6 in (16.31 m)
- Draft: 28 ft 1 in (8.56 m)
- Depth of hold: 39 ft 6 in (12.04 m)
- Propulsion: oil-fired boilers; 1 × quadruple expansion steam engine; 1 × screw propeller
- Speed: 14.85 knots (27.50 km/h)
- Capacity: Cargo: 490,838 cubic feet (13,899.0 m^{3})
- Crew: 18 officers, 40 crewmen
- Notes: Sister ships: Dakotan, Montanan, Pennsylvanian, Panaman, Washingtonian, Iowan, Ohioan

General characteristics (as USS Minnesotan)
- Complement: 88
- Armament: 1 × 4-inch (100 mm) gun; 1 × 3-inch (76 mm) gun

SS Minnesotan was a cargo ship built in 1912 for the American-Hawaiian Steamship Company. During World War I she was known as USAT Minnesotan in service for the United States Army and USS Minnesotan (ID-4545) in service for the United States Navy. She ended her career as the SS Maria Luisa R. under Italian ownership. She was built by the Maryland Steel Company as one of eight sister ships for American-Hawaiian, and was employed in inter-coastal service via the Isthmus of Tehuantepec and the Panama Canal after it opened.

In World War I, USAT Minnesotan carried cargo and animals to France under charter to the U.S. Army from September 1917. When she was transferred to the U.S. Navy in August 1918, USS Minnesotan continued to undertake the same duties; after the Armistice she was converted to a troop transport and returned over 8,000 American troops from France. Returned to American-Hawaiian in 1919, Minnesotan resumed inter-coastal cargo service, and, at least twice, carried racing yachts from the U.S. East Coast to California.

During World War II, Minnesotan was requisitioned by the War Shipping Administration and initially sailed between both New York and Caribbean ports. In the later half of 1943, Minnesotan sailed between Indian Ocean ports. The following year, the cargo ship sailed between New York and ports in the United Kingdom, before eventually returning to the Caribbean. In July 1949, American-Hawaiian sold Minnesotan to Italian owners who renamed her Maria Luisa R.; she was scrapped in 1952 at Bari.

== Design and construction ==
In September 1911, the American-Hawaiian Steamship Company placed an order with the Maryland Steel Company of Sparrows Point, Maryland, for four new cargo ships—Minnesotan, Dakotan, Montanan, and Pennsylvanian. (Note: Maryland Steel had built three ships—Kentuckian, Georgian, and Honolulan—for American-Hawaiian in 1909 in what proved to be a satisfactory arrangement for both companies. See: Cochran and Ginger, p. 358.) The contract cost of the ships was set at the construction cost plus an 8% profit for Maryland Steel, with a maximum cost of $640,000 per ship. The construction was financed by Maryland Steel with a credit plan that called for a 5% down payment in cash with nine monthly installments for the balance. Provisions of the deal allowed that some of the nine installments could be converted into longer-term notes or mortgages. The final cost of Minnesotan, including financing costs, was $65.65 per deadweight ton, which totaled just under $668,000.

Minnesotan (Maryland Steel yard no. 124) was the first ship built under the original contract. (Note: Further contracts on similar terms were signed in November 1911 and May 1912 to build four additional ships: Panaman, Washingtonian, Iowan, Ohioan. See: Cochran and Ginger, p. 358, and Colton.) She was launched on 8 June 1912, and delivered to American-Hawaiian in September. Minnesotan was 6,617 gross register tons (GRT), and was 428 feet 9 inches (130.68 m) in length and 53 feet 7 inches (16.33 m) abeam. She had a deadweight tonnage of 10,175 LT DWT, and her cargo holds had a storage capacity of 490,838 cubic feet (13,899.0 m^{3}). Minnesotan had a speed of 15 knots (28 km/h), and was powered by a single quadruple expansion steam engine with oil-fired boilers, that drove a single screw propeller.

== Early career ==
When Minnesotan began sailing for American-Hawaiian, the company shipped cargo from East Coast ports via the Tehuantepec Route to West Coast ports and Hawaii, and vice versa. Shipments on the Tehuantepec Route arrived at Mexican ports—Salina Cruz, Oaxaca, for eastbound cargo, and Coatzacoalcos, Veracruz, for westbound cargo—and traversed the Isthmus of Tehuantepec on the Tehuantepec National Railway. Eastbound shipments were primarily sugar and pineapple from Hawaii, while westbound cargoes were more general in nature. Minnesotan sailed in this service on the east side of North America.

After the United States occupation of Veracruz on 21 April 1914 (which found six American-Hawaiian ships in Mexican ports), the Huerta-led Mexican government closed the Tehuantepec National Railway to American shipping. This loss of access, coupled with the fact that the Panama Canal was not yet open, caused American-Hawaii to return in late April to its historic route of sailing around South America via the Straits of Magellan. With the opening of the Panama Canal on 15 August 1914, American-Hawaiian ships switched to taking that route.

In October 1915, landslides closed the Panama Canal and all American-Hawaiian ships, including Minnesotan, returned to the Straits of Magellan route again. Minnesotan's exact movements from this time through early 1917 are unclear. She may have been in the half of the American-Hawaiian fleet that was chartered for transatlantic service. She may also have been in the group of American-Hawaiian ships chartered for service to South America, delivering coal, gasoline, and steel in exchange for coffee, nitrates, cocoa, rubber, and manganese ore.

== World War I ==
On 11 September 1917, some five months after the United States declared war on Germany, the United States Army chartered Minnesotan for transporting animals to Europe in support of the American Expeditionary Force. Although there is no information about the specific conversion of Minnesotan, for other ships this typically meant that passenger accommodations had to be ripped out and replaced with ramps and stalls for the horses and mules carried.

On 23 August 1918, Minnesotan was transferred to the United States Navy at Norfolk, Virginia. She was commissioned into the Naval Overseas Transportation Service (NOTS) the same day. Minnesotan was refitted and rearmed and made a brief roundtrip to New York. After taking on a general cargo, Minnesotan sailed 4 September to join a convoy from New York. After passing Gibraltar on 21 September, the cargo ship sailed on to Marseille and unloaded. Departing there on 21 October, she sailed for Newport News via Gibraltar, arriving back in the United States on 7 November.

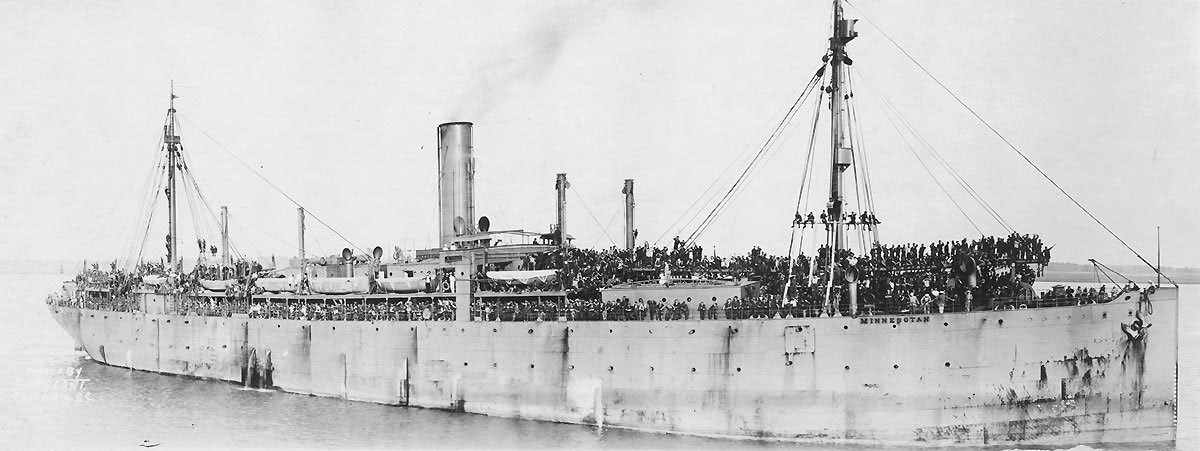
USS Minnesotan with returning troops in 1919 at Charleston, South Carolina

Minnesotan next took on a load of 798 horses and sailed on 30 November for Bordeaux, where she arrived on 13 December. Stopping at Saint-Nazaire the following day, Minnesotan departed for Norfolk on 21 December. After making port at Norfolk on 3 January 1919, the cargo ship sailed for New York, where she was inspected and found to be suitable for use as a troop transport. She was transferred to the Cruiser and Transport Force on 7 January and fitted with bunks and living facilities over the next three months.

Sailing from New York on 30 March, Minnesotan began the first of her four voyages returning American servicemen from France. On 16 April at Saint-Nazaire, Minnesotan began her first homeward journey with troops, embarking several companies of the 111th Infantry Regiment of the U.S. 28th Infantry Division. George W. Cooper, historian of the 2nd Battalion of the 111th Infantry, reported that even though the fighting had been over for some five months, the fear of striking floating mines necessitated that the men wear life jackets for the first three days at sea. Minnesotan landed her 1,765 troops in New York on 28 April.

On her next journey, Minnesotan loaded some 2,000 men of the 304th Ammunition Train and the U.S. 24th Infantry Division, for what turned out to be a rough passage with widespread seasickness. The men on board were greatly relieved when land was spotted, and the ship docked at Charleston, South Carolina, on 29 May.

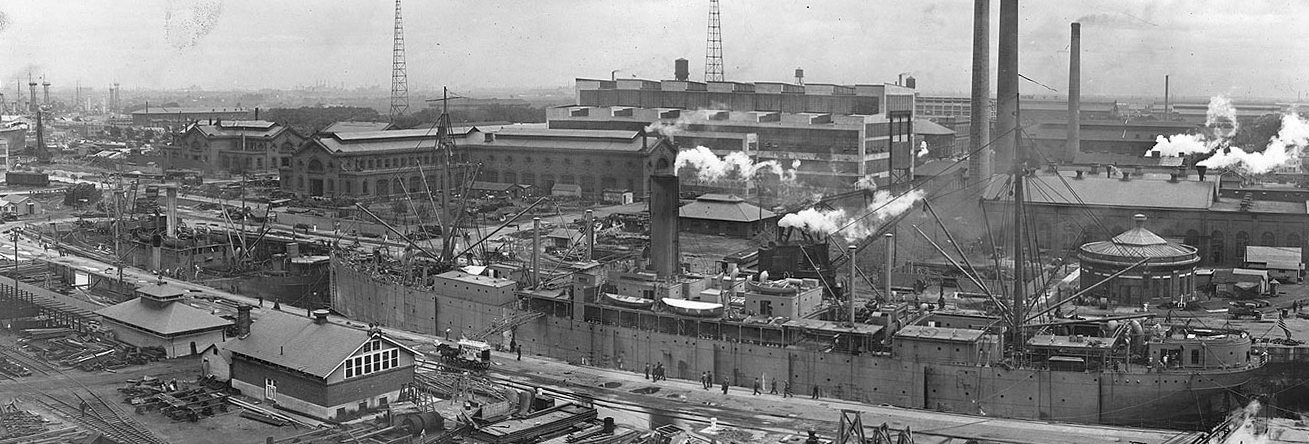
USS Minnesotan (right) is seen in drydock at the Philadelphia Navy Yard in August 1919, where she was prepared for decommissioning.

Details of Minnesotan's third journey are not available, but her final journey began by sailing from Brest on 23 July with elements of the U.S. 4th Infantry Division and ended upon arrival at Philadelphia on 3 August. In total, she carried 8,038 troops in four voyages from France. By 15 August, Minnesotan had entered dry dock at the Philadelphia Navy Yard to prepare for decommissioning, which took place six days later. She was then returned to American-Hawaiian. Leslie White, later a noted American anthropologist, was a crewman aboard USS Minnesotan.

== Interwar years ==
Minnesotan resumed cargo service with American-Hawaiian after her return from World War I service. Though the company had abandoned its original Hawaiian sugar routes by this time, Minnesotan continued inter-coastal service through the Panama Canal. Hints at cargos she carried during this time can be gleaned from contemporary news reports from the Los Angeles Times. In March 1928, for example, the newspaper reported that Minnesotan sailed from Los Angeles with a $2,500,000 cargo that included raw silk and 1,000 long tons (1,000 t) of copper bullion. The 1,000 bales of silk, picked up in Seattle, were worth $1,000,000 on their own, while the load of copper was reportedly the largest water shipment of Arizona copper to that time. Canned goods, grape juice, and locally grown cotton completed the load. The Los Angeles Times also reported that Minnesotan delivered a then-record 3,000-long-ton (3,000 t) cargo from the East Coast to Los Angeles in October 1930. Minnesotan also carried some less-traditional cargo. In February 1928, she delivered one R-class and four six-meter (twenty-foot) sloops to Los Angeles. The five racing yachts, all from East Coast yacht clubs, arrived to sail in the national championships of six-meter and R-class sloops held 10–18 March. (Note: The same five yachts were shipped back east on Virginian in late March. See: "Shipping news and activities at Los Angeles Harbor". Los Angeles Times. 17 March 1928. p. 13.) Minnesotan delivered two other six-meter sloops for new owners in November 1938.

Minnesotan did have one mishap during the interwar period. On 3 May 1936, The New York Times reported that the day before, a receding tide had stranded Minnesotan about a half-mile (800 m) off of Monomoy Point, Massachusetts. Any damage the freighter sustained must have been minor; the cargo ship sailed from New York for San Francisco two weeks later.

=== Labor difficulties ===
Minnesotan played a part in several labor difficulties in the interwar years. In March 1935, the crew of Minnesotan called a wildcat strike that delayed the ship's sailing from Los Angeles by a day, but ended the strike after they were ordered back to work by their union. In October 1935, the deckhands and firemen of Minnesotan and fellow Hawaiian-American ships Nevadan and Golden Tide walked out—this time with the sanction of their union, the Sailors' Union of the Pacific (SUP)—after American-Hawaiian had suspended a member of the International Seamen's Union. In that same month, Minnesotan's deck engineer, Otto Blaczinsky, was murdered while the ship was in Los Angeles Harbor. The Industrial Association of San Francisco, an organization of anti-union businessmen and employers, believed that Blaczinsky was killed because he opposed union policies, and offered a $1,000 reward for information leading to the arrest and conviction of Blaczinsky's killer. (Note: At the time of a similar murder of the Chief Engineer of freighter Point Lobos in March 1936, Blaczinsky's case was still open.) Threats of another Pacific coast strike in late 1936 caused west coast shippers to squeeze as much cargo as possible into Minnesotan and other ships; when Minnesotan arrived at Boston in October, The Christian Science Monitor reported that the ship had arrived "literally laden to her Plimsoll line".

In September 1941, Minnesotan played a peripheral part in a larger protest by union sailors over war bonuses for sailing in the West Indies. The SUP struck on Minnesotan and fellow American-Hawaiian ship Oklahoman on 18 September in sympathy with the Seafarers International Organization, which had called a strike on eleven ships a week before. Both of the American-Hawaiian ships were idled while docked in New York. President Franklin D. Roosevelt called on the unions to end the strike three separate times during his press conference on 24 September. Roosevelt's admonition was heeded and both unions ended their strike after the National Mediation Board agreed to address the wartime bonus dispute.

== World War II ==
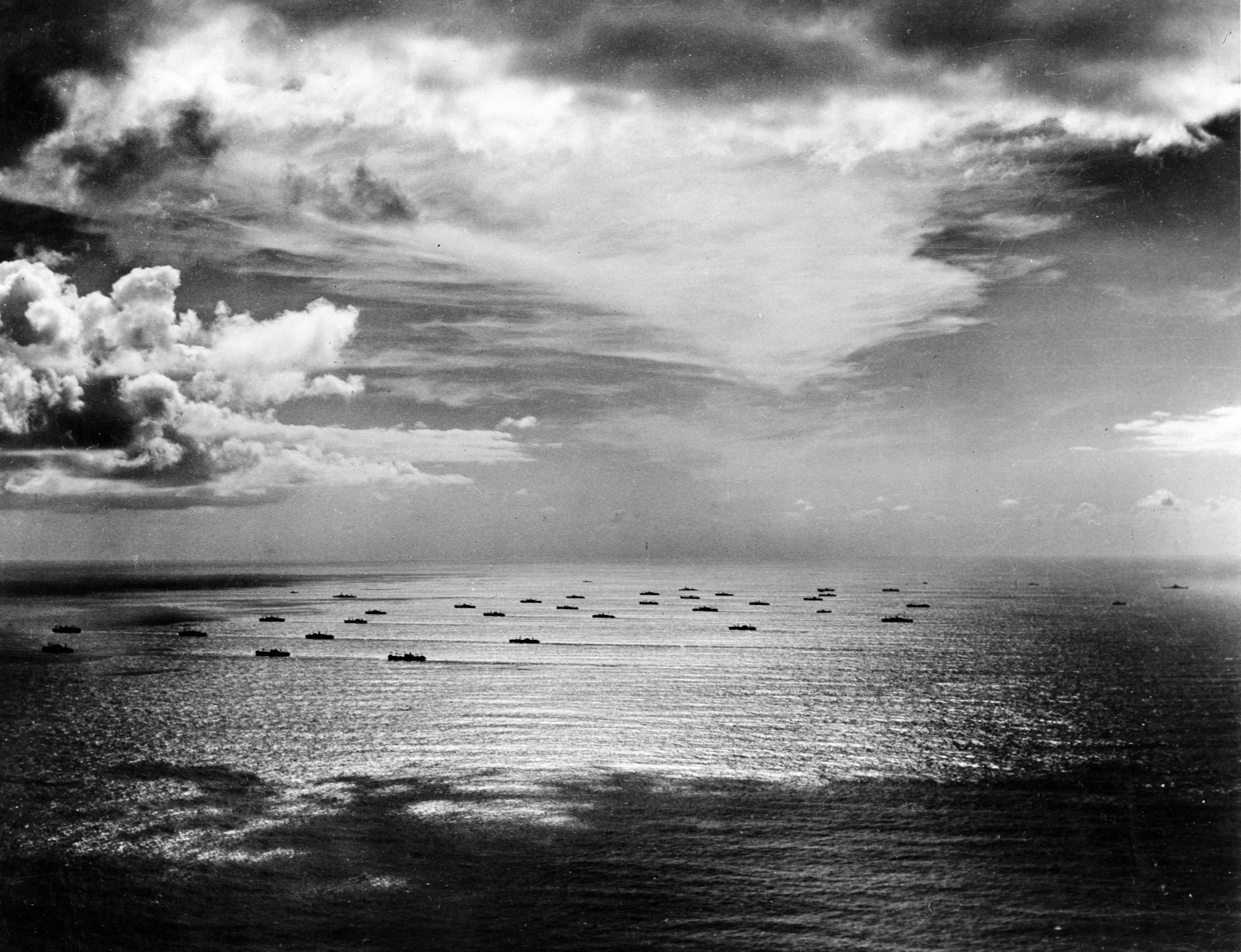
SS Minnesotan sailed in several transatlantic convoys, like this typical one, seen in 1942.

By January 1941, Minnesotan, though still operated by American-Hawaiian, was engaged in defense work for the U.S. government, sailing to ports in South Africa. After the United States entered World War II, Minnesotan was requisitioned by the War Shipping Administration and frequently sailed in convoys. Though complete records of her sailings are unavailable, partial records indicate some of the ports Minnesotan visited during the conflict and some of the cargo she carried. From July 1942 to April 1943, Minnesotan sailed between New York and Caribbean ports, calling at Trinidad, Key West, Hampton Roads, Guantánamo Bay, and Cristóbal.

In June 1943, Minnesotan called at Bombay. She sailed in the Indian Ocean between Calcutta, Colombo, and Bandar Abbas through August. On her last recorded sailing in the Indian Ocean, Minnesotan carried steel rails between Colombo and Calcutta. Minnesotan was back in New York by early December, and sailed to Florida and back by the end of the month.

On 29 December, Minnesotan, loaded with a general cargo that included machinery and explosives, sailed as part of convoy HX 273 from New York for Liverpool. Minnesotan developed an undisclosed problem and returned to St. John's, Newfoundland, where she arrived on 13 January 1944. Thirteen days later, she sailed from St. John's to join convoy HX 276 for Liverpool, where she arrived with the convoy on 7 February. After calling at Methil and Loch Ewe, Minnesotan returned to New York in mid March. Minnesotan sailed on another roundtrip to Liverpool in May, but was back in New York by early June. Her last recorded World War II sailings were from New York to Key West, Guantánamo Bay, and Cristóbal, where she arrived in late July 1944.

== Later career ==
After the war's end, American-Hawaiian continued operating Minnesotan for several more years, but in mid-July 1949, the company announced the sale of Minnesotan to Italian owners in a move approved by the United States Maritime Commission several days later. (Note: American-Hawaiian's 1919 ship Hawaiian was also sold at the same time to Panamanian interests.) The sale of Minnesotan was protested by the Congress of Industrial Organizations which urged the United States Congress to intervene and to help retain American Merchant Marine jobs. Nevertheless, Maria Luisa R., the new name of the former Minnesotan, remained with the Italian buyers, S.A.R.G.A. SpA of Genoa, until she was scrapped in 1952 at Bari.

== Bibliography ==
- Cochran, Thomas C.; Ray Ginger (December 1954). "The American-Hawaiian Steamship Company, 1899–1919". The Business History Review. 28 (4). Boston: The President and Fellows of Harvard College: 343–65. doi:10.2307/3111801. JSTOR 3111801. OCLC 216113867. S2CID 154716297.
- Cooper, George W. (1920). Our Second Battalion: The Accurate and Authentic History of the Second Battalion 111th Infantry. Pittsburgh: Second Battalion Book Co. OCLC 4139237.
- Crowell, Benedict; Robert Forrest Wilson (1921). The Road to France: The Transportation of Troops and Military Supplies, 1917–1918. How America Went to War: An Account From Official Sources of the Nation's War Activities, 1917–1920. New Haven: Yale University Press. ISBN 1-143-73956-6. OCLC 18696066.
- Gleaves, Albert (1921). A History of the Transport Service: Adventures and Experiences of United States Transports and Cruisers in the World War. New York: George H. Doran Company. OCLC 976757.
- Hovey, Edmund Otis (1907). "The Isthmus of Tehuantepec and the Tehuantepec National Railway". Bulletin of the American Geographical Society. 39 (2). New York: American Geographical Society: 78–91. doi:10.2307/198380. JSTOR 198380. OCLC 2097765.
- Loomis, Ernest L. (1920). History of the 304th Ammunition Train. Boston: R.G. Badger. OCLC 6871043.
- Peace, William J. (2007). "Leslie A. White and the Socio-Politics of War". In Regna Darnell and Frederic W. Gleach (ed.). Histories of Anthropology Annual: Volume 3. Lincoln: University of Nebraska Press. ISBN 978-0-8032-6664-3. OCLC 181068410.
- Smith, Harry L.; James Russell Eckman (1940). "Into the Rhineland". Memoirs of an ambulance company officer. Rochester, Minnesota: Doomsday Press. OCLC 4878505. Archived from the original on 23 September 2008.
- Naval Historical Center. "Minnesotan". Dictionary of American Naval Fighting Ships. Navy Department, Naval History and Heritage Command.
