= 49th Coast Artillery (United States) =

49th Coast Artillery Regiment
- Active: 1918–1919; 1942–1944
- Country: United States
- Branch: Army
- Type: Coast artillery, served as field artillery
- Role: Tractor drawn heavy artillery (WWI); Searchlight (WWII)
- Size: Regiment (WWI); Battery (WWII)
- Mascot: Oozlefinch
- Engagements: World War I World War II

The 49th Coast Artillery Regiment was a Coast Artillery Corps regiment in the Regular Army. It was mobilized in World War I, with the searchlight battery mobilized in World War II.

== World War I ==
The 49th Artillery (Coast Artillery Corps) (CAC) was organized in July 1918 at Camp Eustis, Virginia, commanded by Colonel Le Vert Coleman. The regiment was one of a number of US Army coast artillery units organized to operate heavy field artillery and railway artillery on the Western Front. It moved to Brest, France, via the Newport News port of embarkation in October 1918 on the French transport SS Lutetia, accompanied by the 38th Artillery Brigade (CAC) headquarters. Upon arrival, the regiment moved from Brest to Operations & Training Center No. 4 at Angers, France. The regiment was slated to be armed with 24 British-designed, American-made 8-inch M1917 howitzers, but did not commence training, see action, or receive guns before the war ended. It returned to the US on the troop transport USS Panaman, arriving at Camp Merritt, New Jersey, in March 1919, and demobilized that month at Camp Grant, Illinois.

An American Legion memorial with a retrospective on Captain Samuel H. Bradbury Jr., an officer of the regiment who died of influenza in transit to France, mentions that he was an uncle of science fiction author Ray Bradbury, though Samuel died before Ray was born. Captain Bradbury is interred at the Oise-Aisne American Cemetery near Fère-en-Tardenois, France. The memorial was probably placed by the American Legion Homer Dahringer Post 281 in Waukegan, Illinois, birthplace of both Bradburys.

== World War II ==
During World War II, the regiment was re-constituted on 28 April 1942 as an inactive regiment in the Army of the United States. Battery G (searchlight) activated 1 May 1942 at Fort MacArthur, California, in the Harbor Defenses of Los Angeles. No other components were activated. One source states the unit served in the northern Solomon Islands campaign but has no specific locations or dates. The 49th moved to Camp Barkeley, Texas, on 28 April 1944 and inactivated there on 8 May 1944.

== Campaign streamers ==
World War II

- Northern Solomons

== See also ==
- United States Army Coast Artillery Corps
