= SS Kentuckian =

American cargo ship

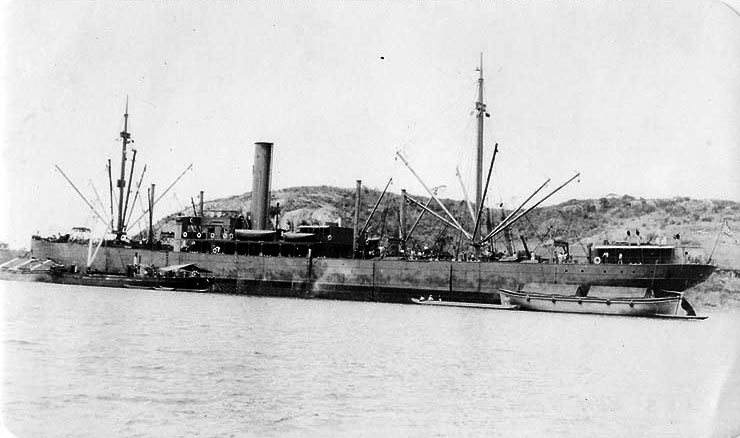
- SS Kentuckian, c. 1917–18

History
- Name: SS Kentuckian
- Owner: American-Hawaiian Steamship Company
- Ordered: Second quarter, 1909
- Builder: Maryland Steel; Sparrows Point, Maryland
- Cost: $579,000
- Yard number: 104
- Launched: 19 March 1910
- Sponsored by: Miss Nancy Johnson
- Completed: 1 June 1910
- Identification: Official number:207489
- Fate: Chartered to U.S. Army

United States
- Name: USAT Kentuckian
- Acquired: Before March 1918
- Fate: Acquired by U.S. Navy, December 1918

United States
- Name: USS Kentuckian (ID-1544)
- Acquired: 16 December 1918
- Commissioned: 28 January 1919
- Decommissioned: 15 September 1919
- Fate: Returned to American-Hawaiian
- Name: SS Kentuckian
- Owner: American-Hawaiian Steamship Company
- Acquired: returned from U.S. Navy, 15 September 1919
- Honors and awards: 1 battle star, Convoy HX 233, 16–18 April 1942
- Fate: Sunk as a breakwater off Normandy, 12 August 1944

General characteristics
- Type: Cargo ship
- Tonnage: 6,479 GRT 9,925 LT DWT
- Displacement: 14,405 t
- Length: 414 ft 2 in (126.24 m) (LPP); 430 ft (131.1 m) (overall)
- Beam: 53 ft 6 in (16.31 m)
- Propulsion: oil-fired boilers; 1 × quadruple-expansion steam engine; 1 × screw propeller
- Speed: 12 knots (22 km/h; 14 mph)
- Capacity: Cargo: 428,145 cubic feet (12,123.7 m^{3})

General characteristics (as USAT Kentuckian)
- Type: Cargo ship
- Armament: 5-inch/51-caliber (130 mm) gun mount

General characteristics (as USS Kentuckian)
- Type: troop transport
- Troops: 1,900

SS Kentuckian was a cargo ship built in 1910 for the American-Hawaiian Steamship Company. During World War I she was known as USAT Kentuckian in service for the United States Army and USS Kentuckian (ID-1544) in service for the United States Navy. After her Navy career, she reverted to her original name of SS Kentuckian.

She was built by the Maryland Steel Company as first of three ships ordered by the American-Hawaiian Steamship Company, and was employed in inter-coastal service via the Isthmus of Tehuantepec and the Panama Canal after it opened. In World War I, USAT Kentuckian carried cargo and animals to France under charter to the U.S. Army. When transferred to the U.S. Navy in December 1918, a month after the Armistice, USS Kentuckian was converted to a troop transport and returned almost 8,900 American troops from France. Returned to American-Hawaiian in 1919, Kentuckian resumed inter-coastal cargo service.

Shortly before World War II, Kentuckian was requisitioned by the War Shipping Administration and sailed between Trinidad and African ports, between New York and Caribbean ports, and in transatlantic convoys through mid 1944. In mid-July 1944, the ship was scuttled as part of the breakwater for one of the Mulberry artificial harbors built to support the Normandy Invasion.

== Design and construction ==
In the second quarter of 1909, American-Hawaiian, looking to expand its fleet, placed an order with the Maryland Steel Company of Sparrows Point, Maryland, for three new cargo ships—Kentuckian, Georgian, and Honolulan. The contract for the ships required that American-Hawaiian pay $1,000,000 in cash and a further $650,000 in twelve monthly notes at 5% interest. Provisions of the deal allowed that the monthly notes could be converted into longer-term mortgages at 6% interest, and secured by the ships themselves. (Note: American-Hawaiian was so pleased by the arrangements with Maryland Steel, and by the ships themselves, that they gave Maryland Steel the monopoly for all future construction, a further eleven ships by 1914. See: Cochran and Ginger, pp. 358, 365.) The final cost of Kentuckian, including financing costs, was $58.33 per deadweight ton, which came out to just under $579,000.

Kentuckian (Maryland Steel yard no. 104) was the first ship built under the contract. She was launched on 19 March 1910, by Miss Nancy Johnson, the daughter of U.S. Representative Ben Johnson (D-KY), who christened the ship with sparkling spring water from the Kentucky farms of Abraham Lincoln and Jefferson Davis. (Note: Senator and Mrs. William Edgar Borah (R-ID) and the wives of Representative Joseph F. Howell (D-UT) and former senator Thomas H. Paynter (D-KY) were among the invited guests at the noon launching ceremony. All had taken a special train from Washington, D.C. at 10:00 that morning.) The completed ship, delivered to American-Hawaiian on 1 June, was 6,479 gross register tons (GRT), and was 414 feet 2 inches (126.24 m) in length (between perpendiculars) and 53 feet 6 inches (16.31 m) abeam. She had a deadweight tonnage of 9,925 LT DWT, and her cargo holds had a storage capacity of 428,145 cubic feet (12,123.7 m^{3}). Kentuckian had a single quadruple-expansion steam engine powered by oil-fired boilers that drove a single screw propeller at a speed of 11 knots (20 km/h).

== Early career ==
When Kentuckian began sailing for American-Hawaiian, the company shipped cargo from East Coast ports via the Tehuantepec Route to West Coast ports and Hawaii, and vice versa. Shipments on the Tehuantepec Route would arrive at Mexican ports—Salina Cruz, Oaxaca, for eastbound cargo, and Coatzacoalcos, Veracruz, for westbound cargo—and would traverse the Isthmus of Tehuantepec on the Tehuantepec National Railway. Eastbound shipments were primarily sugar and pineapple from Hawaii, while westbound cargoes were more general in nature. Kentuckian sailed in this service but it is not clear from sources whether on the east or west side of North America.

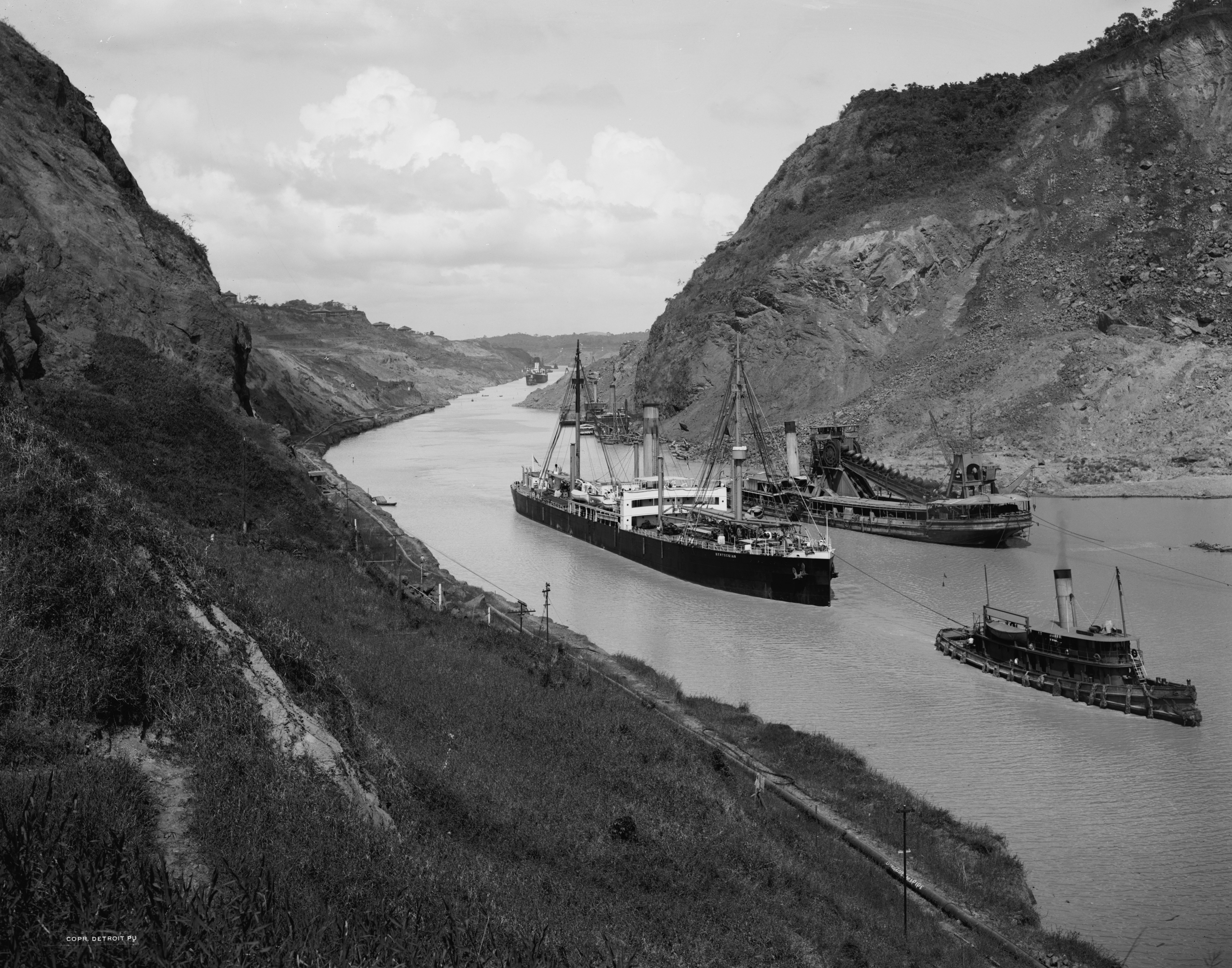
SS Kentuckian passes through the Culebra Cut as she transits the Panama Canal.

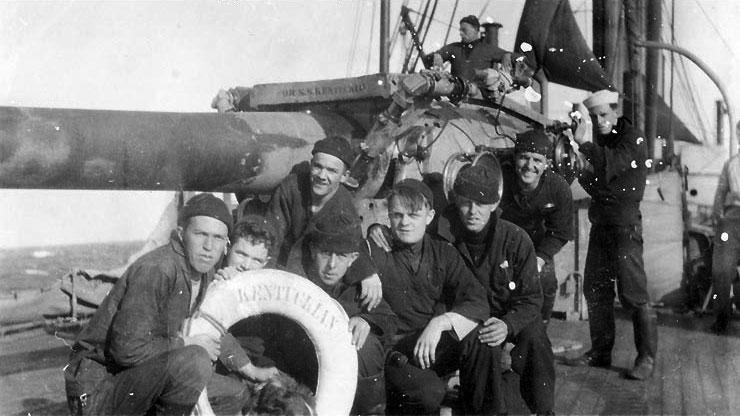
Kentuckian's Naval Armed Guard poses with their 5-inch/51-caliber (127 mm) gun. Naval gunners on Kentuckian claimed a hit on a running German torpedo in April 1918.

After the United States occupation of Veracruz on 21 April 1914 (which found six American-Hawaiian ships in Mexican ports), the Huerta-led Mexican government closed the Tehuantepec National Railway to American shipping. This loss of access coupled with the fact that the Panama Canal was not yet open, caused American-Hawaii to return in late April to its historic route of sailing around South America via the Straits of Magellan. With the opening of the Panama Canal on 15 August, American-Hawaiian ships switched to taking that route.

In October 1915, landslides closed the Panama Canal and all American-Hawaiian ships, including Kentuckian, returned to the Straits of Magellan route again. Kentuckian's exact movements from this time through early 1918 are unclear. She may have been in the half of the American-Hawaiian fleet that was chartered for transatlantic service. She may also have been in the group of American-Hawaiian ships chartered for service to South America, delivering coal, gasoline, and steel in exchange for coffee, nitrates, cocoa, rubber, and manganese ore.

== World War I ==
At some point after the United States declared war on Germany in April 1917, the United States Army chartered Kentuckian for transporting animals to Europe in support of the American Expeditionary Force. Although there is no information about the specific conversion of Kentuckian, for other ships this typically meant that any passenger accommodations had to be ripped out and replaced with ramps and stalls for the horses and mules carried.

Details about Kentuckian's first animal transport journey are not known, but her second trip began 14 March 1918 when she sailed from Newport News, Virginia, with 848 animals for Saint-Nazaire, where she unloaded all but the four animals that had died or were destroyed during the voyage. On 24 April, during a convoy crossing in Army service, Naval Armed Guardsmen on Kentuckian sighted a torpedo heading towards the second ship behind her in the column. Opening fire on the torpedo, the gun crew claimed the hit that caused the torpedo to explode short of its intended target. Further details of Kentuckian's Army service are not available.

With the signing of the Armistice on 11 November, the fighting came to an end and the task of bringing home American soldiers began almost immediately. To that end, Kentuckian was acquired by the United States Navy on 16 December, and commissioned on 28 January 1919, . Before she could begin returning troops, though, Kentuckian had to undergo conversion from a cargo and animal ship. Though sources do not indicate the specific modifications Kentuckian underwent, typical conversions for other ships included the installation of berths for troops, and adding greatly expanded cooking and toilet facilities to handle the large numbers of men aboard. Similar modifications on a fellow American-Hawaiian cargo ship, the two-years-younger Minnesotan, took three months, but it is not known how long Kentuckian's refit took.

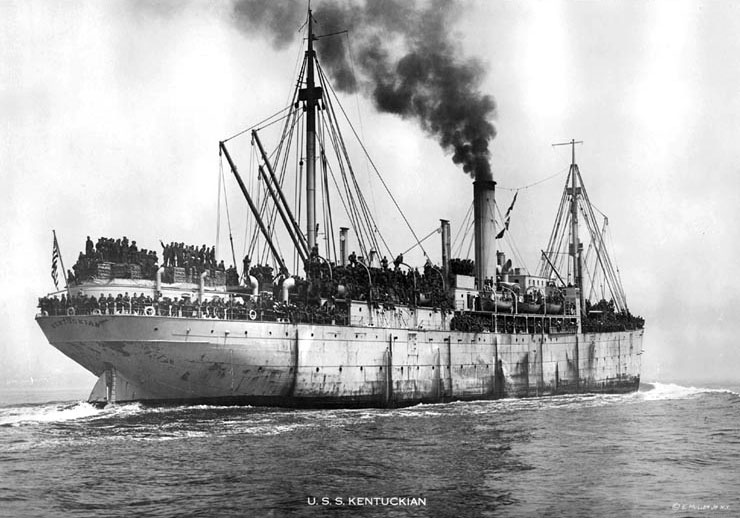
USS Kentuckian returns American troops in 1919.

Kentuckian departed New York for her first trooping voyage on 2 March, picking up nearly 2,000 soldiers at Saint-Nazaire—among them some 1,500 men of the 363rd Infantry Regiment of the U.S. 91st Infantry Division, and a number from the U.S. 33rd Infantry Division—before returning to New York on 1 April. Her arrival on another trooping run in June returned 1,860 men, including over 1,500 members of the 345th Field Artillery Regiment of the U.S. 90th Infantry Division. An officer of that unit brought back a black police dog named Pat, who, purportedly, had been the personal dog of Germany's Crown Prince Wilhelm. Another trip in July returned another 1,852 men from Saint-Nazaire. In all, Kentuckian made a total of five trooping runs from France, bringing back 8,895 men by the time she completed her last trip on 31 August at Norfolk, Virginia. She was decommissioned on 15 September and returned to American-Hawaiian the same day.

== Interwar years ==
Kentuckian resumed cargo service with American-Hawaiian after her return from World War I service. Though the company had abandoned its original Hawaiian sugar routes by this time, Kentuckian continued inter-coastal service through the Panama Canal with a few incidents that interrupted what was a mostly uneventful twenty years. In September 1928, a day after sailing from San Francisco, Kentuckian was rammed by the General Petroleum tanker Los Alamos near Point Sur, California, in a thick fog. Kentuckian had a leak in her number two cargo hold and damage to her port bilge keel and returned to San Francisco for repairs. In early April 1933, a fire broke out in Kentuckian's number two cargo hold, which resulted in the delay of the ship at Panama from 8 to 14 April. Kentuckian made her way to Los Angeles over the next ten days, where surveyors examined the ship and her general cargo.

For the most part, Kentuckian primarily carried general cargoes whose contents were not noteworthy. One exception occurred in July 1929, when The New York Times reported that Kentuckian was carrying, Pirate, an R-class racing yacht to races at Larchmont and Marblehead. The newspaper reported that Pirate was the first West Coast designed and built yacht to race in the East.

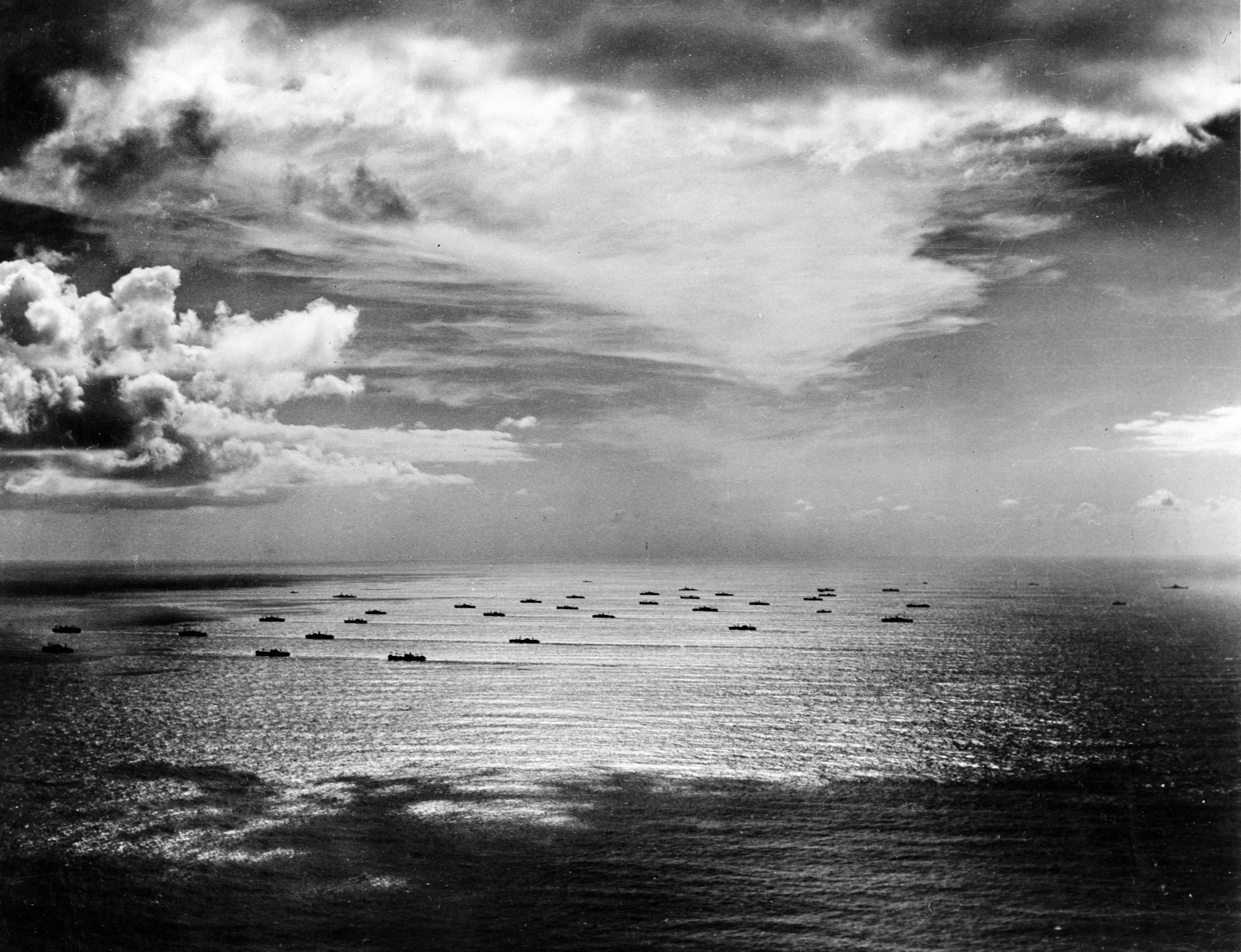
SS Kentuckian sailed in eleven transatlantic convoys, like this typical one, seen in 1942.

Unlike SS Minnesotan, a fellow American-Hawaiian ship that was plagued with labor difficulties, Kentuckian seems to have escaped much of the maritime labor turmoil of the mid-1930s. One incident was reported by the Los Angeles Times in August 1936. The news item reported that a portion of Kentuckian's crew went on strike in protest against unsafe working conditions. The ship's master had ordered the deckhands to rig one of the cargo booms after the ship docked in Los Angeles, but they refused because the deck was slippery and therefore, in their opinion, unsafe. (Note: There was no follow up report indicating the ultimate resolution of the incident.)

== World War II ==
Shortly before the United States entered World War II, Kentuckian was requisitioned by the War Shipping Administration (WSA), but continued to be operated by American-Hawaiian. On 19 November 1941, Kentuckian sailed from New York for Durban, where she arrived on 21 December. Kentuckian spent the next two months sailing between ports in South Africa and Mozambique, calling at Port Elizabeth, Cape Town, and East London in the former, and Lourenco Marques, and Beira in the latter, before heading to Trinidad from Cape Town on 28 February 1942. Arriving at Trinidad three weeks later, she made her way up to Boston by early April, before putting in at New York for about six weeks. Sailing from New York in late May, Kentuckian joined a southbound Hampton Roads, Virginia – Key West, Florida convoy. She left the convoy before Key West and headed back across the Atlantic to Cape Town, where she arrived on 7 July. Kentuckian spent the next month sailing between Cape Town, East London, and Durban. Kentuckian concluded her second trip to Africa when she sailed for South America on 1 August.

After a three-week crossing of the South Atlantic, Kentuckian arrived at Paramaribo on 22 August, where she took on a load of bauxite and made her way to New York, where she docked on 20 September. The cargo ship slowly made her way south, calling at Charleston, Key West, and Guantánamo Bay along her way to Trinidad, where she arrived on 5 November. Sailing 11 November, Kentuckian began her third and final trip to Africa. She arrived at Freetown on 25 November and called at Bathurst and Takoradi over the next two months before returning to Trinidad on 31 January 1943. Sailing from Trinidad on 4 February, she called at Guantánamo Bay and Baltimore on her way to New York, where, arriving in late March, she prepared to begin transatlantic convoy sailings to the United Kingdom.

On 1 April, Kentuckian, loaded with grain and general cargo, departed as a part of Convoy HX 232, the 232nd New York – Halifax – Liverpool convoy. Developing some unreported problem, she returned to New York on 3 April. The problem must have been minor, because she sailed as part of Convoy HX 233 three days later. This convoy was attacked by no fewer than eight German submarines, which resulted in the loss of only one ship, the British cargo ship Fort Rampart, and the sinking of 175 by convoy escorts. There is no evidence that Kentuckian played any direct part in the sinking of the German submarine, but, nevertheless, members of her Naval Armed Guard were awarded a battle star for actions in the convoy from 16 to 18 April. (Note: Haskell reports that the Naval Armed Guardsmen of all the American-flagged ships in Convoy HX 233 were awarded a battle star, even though the Armed Guard contingents on some of the ships were unaware that a submarine had been sighted, much less sunk. Merchant seamen on the vessels received no such award. See: Haskell, pp. 40–41.) Kentuckian arrived at Liverpool on 21 April. Over the next ten months, Kentuckian made nine more convoy crossings between the UK—where she called at Liverpool, Swansea, Milford Haven, Methil, Loch Ewe, Immingham, and Belfast Lough—and New York. She ended her tenth North Atlantic crossing when she arrived at New York on 16 February 1944.

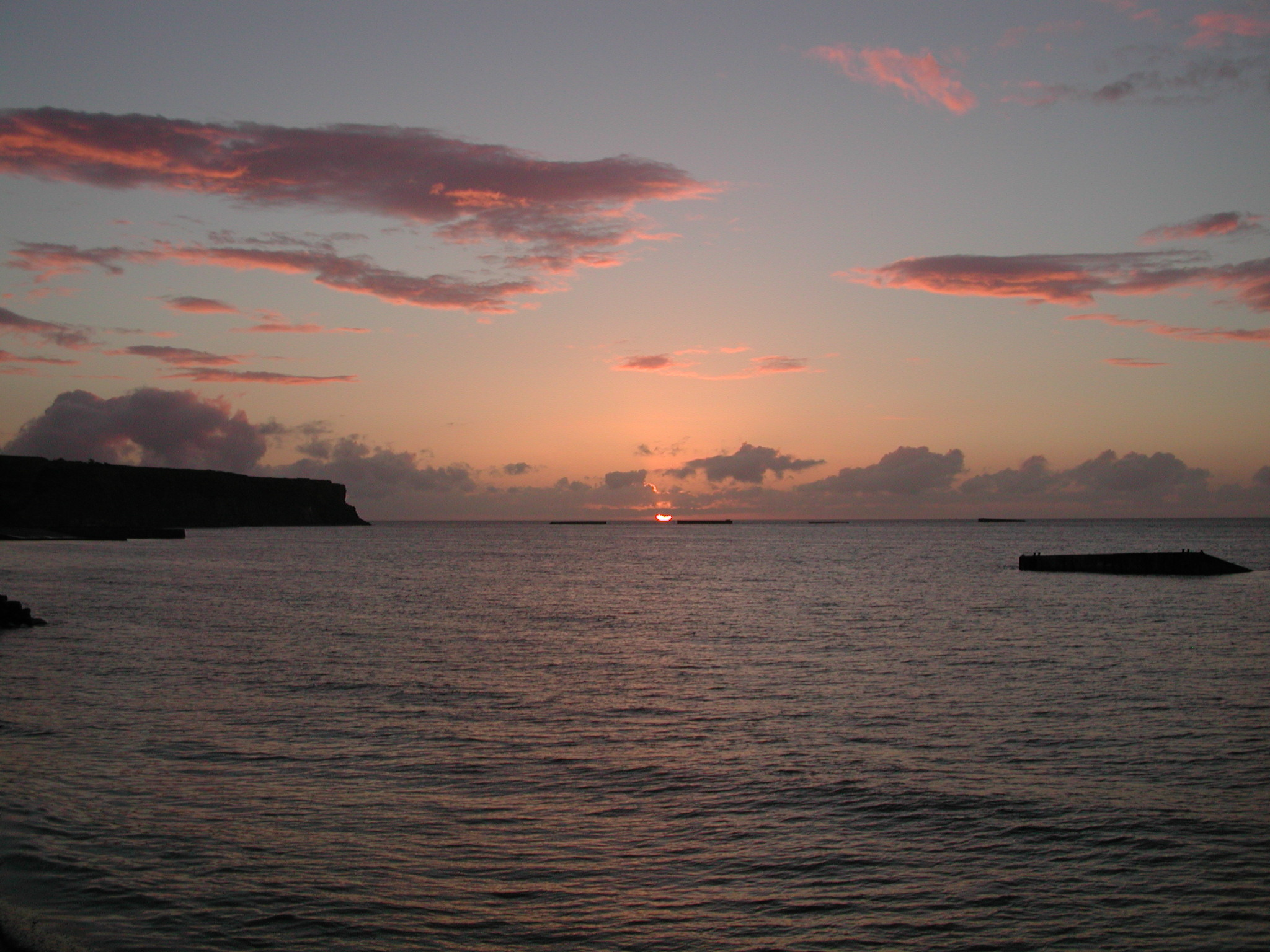
Five of the remaining caissons from the Mulberry Harbor at Arromanches-les-Bains as seen in May 2005. SS Kentuckian was scuttled as part of the breakwater to protect the harbor.

Sailing from New York on 26 February, Kentuckian made two circuits between that port and the Caribbean, calling at Nuevitas, Cuba, and Manatí, Puerto Rico, and making stops at Key West and Philadelphia along the way, before putting in at New York on 15 April. Kentuckian departed the United States for the final time on 19 May and headed for Milford Haven. After arriving there on 3 June, the cargo ship arrived at Barry via Plymouth, Belfast Lough, and Falmouth, on 27 June. Departing Barry on 8 July as a part of Convoy EBC-35, Kentuckian arrived at Arromanches on 10 July and was scuttled there as part of a breakwater protecting the mulberry harbor constructed there in support of the Normandy invasion.

In March 1945, the WSA offered a payment of $565,910 to American-Hawaiian for Kentuckian as part of a $7.2 million settlement for eleven requisitioned American-Hawaiian ships that had either been sunk, scuttled (like Kentuckian), or were to be retained by the government.

== Bibliography ==
- Cochran, Thomas C.; Ray Ginger (December 1954). "The American-Hawaiian Steamship Company, 1899–1919". The Business History Review. 28 (4). Boston: The President and Fellows of Harvard College: 343–365. doi:10.2307/3111801. ISSN 0007-6805. JSTOR 3111801. OCLC 216113867. S2CID 154716297.
- Crowell, Benedict; Robert Forrest Wilson (1921). The Road to France: The Transportation of Troops and Military Supplies, 1917–1918. How America Went to War: An Account From Official Sources of the Nation's War Activities, 1917–1920. New Haven: Yale University Press. OCLC 18696066.
- Gleaves, Albert (1921). A History of the Transport Service: Adventures and Experiences of United States Transports and Cruisers in the World War. New York: George H. Doran Company. OCLC 976757.
- Haskell, Winthrop A. (1998). Shadows on the Horizon: The Battle of Convoy HX-233. Annapolis, Maryland: Naval Institute Press. ISBN 978-1-55750-887-4. OCLC 40834201.
- Hovey, Edmund Otis (1907). "The Isthmus of Tehuantepec and the Tehuantepec National Railway". Bulletin of the American Geographical Society. 39 (2). New York: American Geographical Society: 78–91. doi:10.2307/198380. ISSN 0190-5929. JSTOR 198380. OCLC 2097765.
- Naval Historical Center. "Kentuckian". Dictionary of American Naval Fighting Ships. Navy Department, Naval History and Heritage Command.
- Naval Historical Center. "Minnesotan". Dictionary of American Naval Fighting Ships. Navy Department, Naval History & Heritage Command.
