= SS Washingtonian =

A number of steamships were named Washingtonian, including:

- SS Washingtonian (1913), in service 1914–15
- SS Washingtonian (1919), in service 1919–42
