= Albert Gleaves =

American historian and US Navy admiral

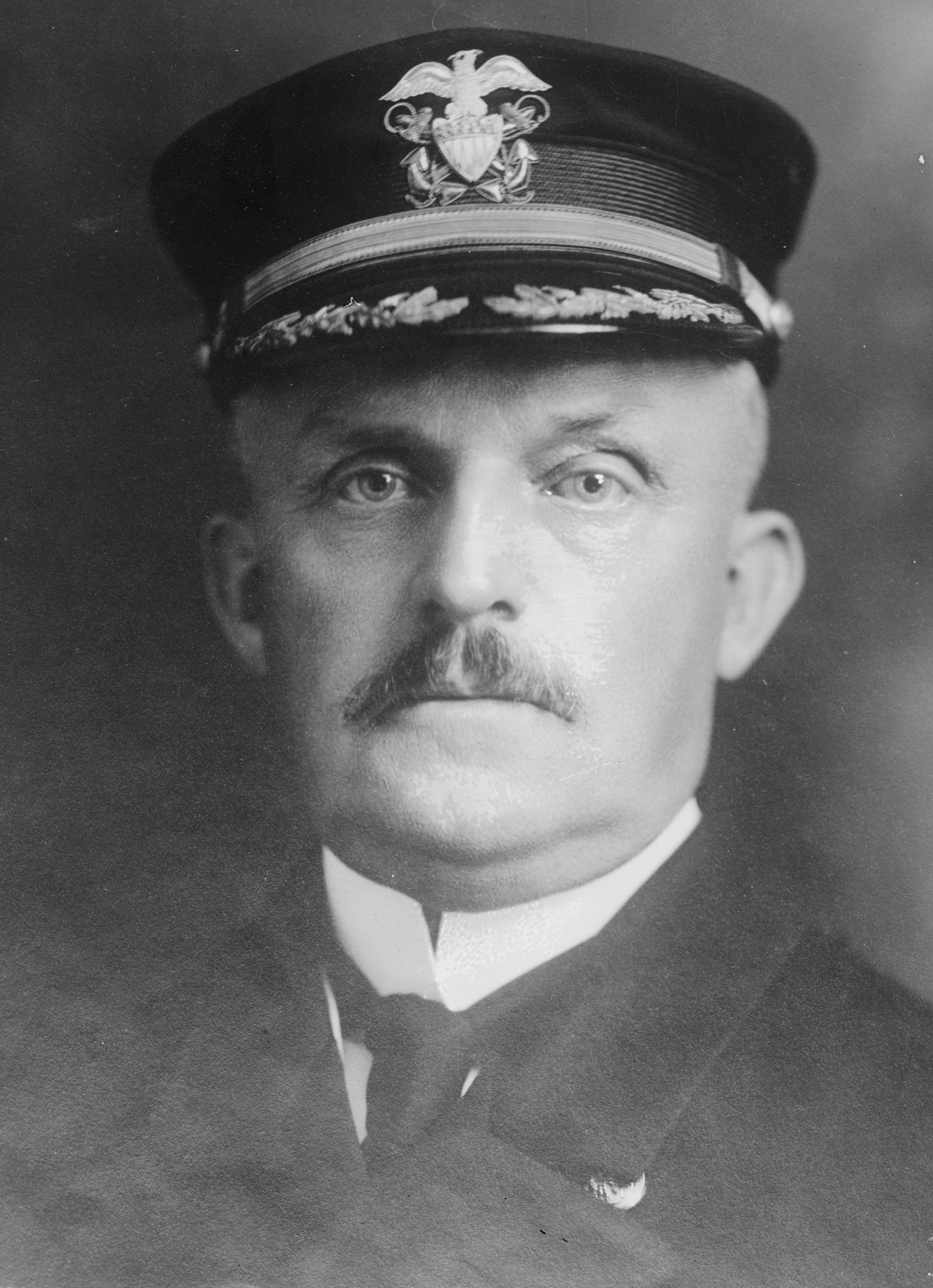
- Gleaves in 1917
- Born: January 1, 1858; Nashville, Tennessee, US
- Died: January 6, 1937 (aged 79); Haverford, Pennsylvania, US
- Burial place: Arlington National Cemetery
- Military career
- Allegiance: United States
- Branch: United States Navy
- Service years: 1877–1921
- Rank: Admiral
- Commands: Cushing; Dolphin; Mayflower; St. Louis; North Dakota; Commandant Naval Station, Narragansett Bay, Rhode Island; Utah; Commander, Cruiser and Transport Force
- Conflicts: Spanish–American War; World War I
- Awards: Distinguished Service Medal; Army Distinguished Service Medal
- Other work: Author

Albert Gleaves (January 1, 1858 – January 6, 1937) was a decorated admiral in the United States Navy, also notable as a naval historian.

== Biography ==
Born in Nashville, Tennessee, Gleaves graduated from the United States Naval Academy in 1877. After serving on board Hartford and Trenton, he was appointed an Ensign in 1881. Assigned to many ships and stations, he commanded Cushing during the Spanish–American War and later the battleship North Dakota. Promoted to rear admiral in 1915, in World War I he commanded the Cruiser and Transport Force. For his outstanding contribution he was awarded the Army and Navy Distinguished Service Medals.

In 1919 he was promoted to Admiral and commanded the Asiatic Fleet. While serving at the Naval Ordnance Proving Ground, Admiral Gleaves made outstanding contributions in the field of gunnery and torpedoes. While carrying out some tests on torpedo steering devices he changed these weapons from instruments of luck into instruments of precision. The gear which he tested in Cushing provided the imprints which made the torpedo the "terrible weapon" of World War I.

In spite of a life of constant action in war and peace, he found time to write a biography of Captain James Lawrence; A History of the Transport Service, and The Life of an American Sailor: Rear Admiral William Hemsley Emory, United States Navy, from His Letters and Memoirs. After a most distinguished career, he retired on January 1, 1922.

He was a companion of the Naval Order of the United States and was assigned insignia number 756.

Admiral Gleaves died at Haverford, Pennsylvania, January 6, 1937, a few days after his 79th birthday.

He has been quoted as saying, "To seamen a ship becomes endowed with human virtues and faults; she ceases to be a mere inanimate thing."

There was a statue of Admiral Gleaves at the State Capitol in Nashville, Tennessee. The statue was moved to the Tennessee State Museum to be included in a military exhibit.

== Decorations ==

1st Row	Navy Distinguished Service Medal		Army Distinguished Service Medal
2nd Row	Spanish Campaign Medal	Philippine Campaign Medal	World War I Victory Medal with Fleet Clasp
3rd Row	Commander of the French Legion of Honour	Japanese Order of the Sacred Treasure, 1st Class	Chinese Order of Wen-Hu, 1st Class

== Namesake ==
USS Gleaves (DD-423), a Gleaves-class destroyer, was the lead ship of her class and named for Admiral Gleaves.

== Gallery ==
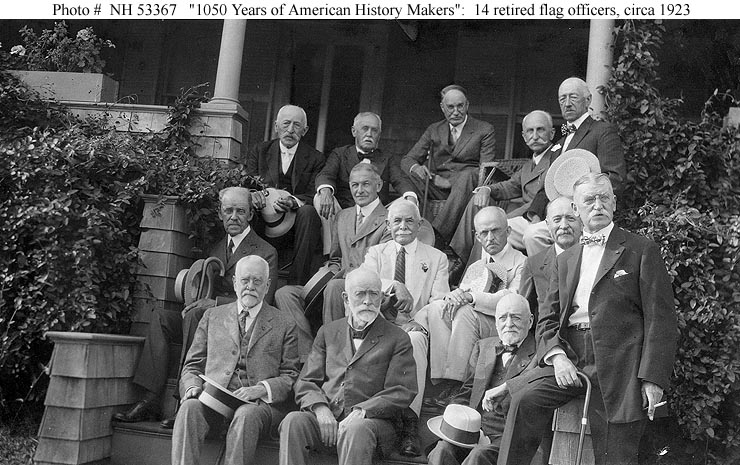
Gleaves is fourth from the left in the middle row in this photograph of 13 retired U.S. Navy and U.S. Marine Corps flag officers taken ca. 1923.

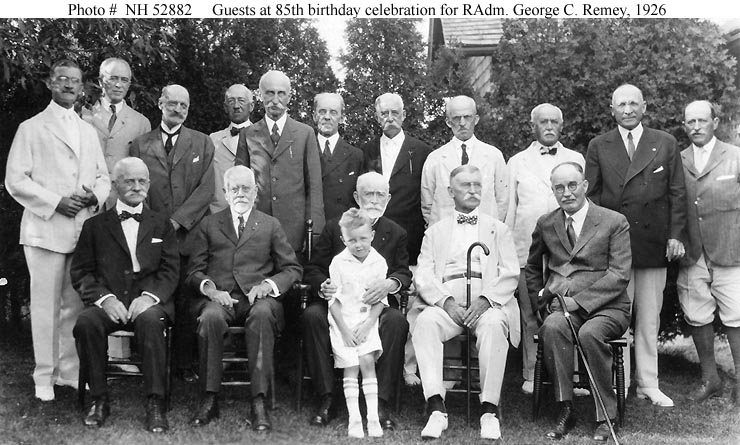
Gleaves is standing fourth from right in this photo of retired flag officers taken at the 85th birthday party of Rear Admiral George C. Remey on 10 August 1926.

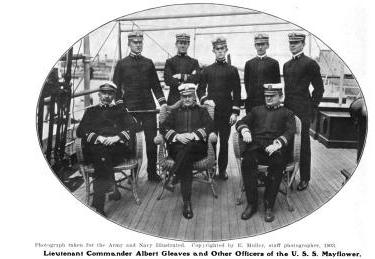
Lieutenant Commander Gleaves and Other Officers of the USS Mayflower (PY-1) in 1903

== See also ==
Military offices
Preceded by William Ledyard Rodgers	Commander-in-Chief, United States Asiatic Fleet; 1 September 1919 – 4 February 1921	Succeeded by Joseph Strauss
