= SS Washingtonian (1913) =

American freighter that sank off Delaware after a collision

Coordinates: 38°27′28″N 74°40′34″W

- Washingtonian in port, about 1914

History
- Name: Washingtonian
- Owner: American-Hawaiian Steamship Company
- Ordered: September 1911
- Builder: Maryland Steel; Sparrows Point, MD
- Cost: $733000
- Yard number: 131
- Launched: 11 October 1913
- Completed: 16 January 1914
- Identification: US official number 211297; code letters LDHW
- Fate: Sunk in collision, 26 January 1915

General characteristics
- Type: refrigerated cargo ship
- Tonnage: 6,650 GRT, 4,064 NRT 10,250 LT DWT
- Length: 407.7 ft (124.3 m) (LPP)
- Beam: 43.7 ft (13.3 m)
- Depth: 36.1 ft (11.0 m)
- Installed power: 704 NHP
- Propulsion: oil-fired boilers; 1 × quadruple-expansion engine; 1 × screw
- Speed: 12.5 knots (23 km/h)
- Capacity: 490,858 cubic feet (13,900 m^{3})
- Crew: 40
- Notes: Sister ships: Minnesotan, Dakotan, Montanan, Pennsylvanian, Panaman, Iowan, Ohioan

SS Washingtonian was a refrigerated cargo ship launched in 1913 by the Maryland Steel of Sparrows Point, Maryland, near Baltimore, as one of eight sister ships for the American-Hawaiian Steamship Company. When completed, she was the largest cargo ship in the US registry. During the United States occupation of Veracruz in April 1914, Washingtonian was chartered by the United States Department of the Navy for service as a non-commissioned refrigerated supply ship for the US fleet stationed off the Mexican coast.

In January 1915, after a little more than one year of service, Washingtonian collided with the schooner Elizabeth Palmer off the Delaware coast and sank in ten minutes with the loss of her $1,000,000 cargo of 10,000 long tons (10,200 t) of raw Hawaiian sugar. In the days after Washingtonian's sinking, the price of sugar in the United States increased almost nine percent, partly attributed to the loss of Washingtonian's cargo. Lying under about 100 feet (30 m) of water, Washingtonian's wreck is one of the most popular recreational dive sites on the eastern seaboard.

== Design and construction ==
In November 1911, the American-Hawaiian Steamship Company placed an order with the Maryland Steel Company of Sparrows Point, Maryland, for two new cargo ships — Panaman and Washingtonian. (Note: Maryland Steel had built three ships—Kentuckian, Georgian, and Honolulan—for American-Hawaiian in 1909 in what proved to be a satisfactory arrangement for both companies, and in September 1911, American-Hawaiian placed an order for Washingtonian's four older sister ships—Minnesotan, Dakotan, Montanan, and Pennsylvanian.) The contract cost of the ships was set at the construction cost plus an eight percent profit for Maryland Steel, but capped at a maximum cost of $640,000 each. The construction was financed by Maryland Steel with a credit plan that called for a five percent down payment in cash and nine monthly installments for the balance. The deal had provisions that allowed some of the nine installments to be converted into longer-term notes or mortgages. The final cost of Washingtonian, including financing costs, was $71.49 per deadweight ton, which totaled just under $733,000.

Washingtonian (Maryland Steel yard no. 131) was the second ship built under the contract. Her between perpendiculars was 407.7 ft (124.3 m), her beam was 43.7 ft (13.3 m), and her depth was 36.1 ft (11.0 m). Her tonnages were 6,650 GRT, 4,064 NRT, and 10,250 LT DWT. When completed, she was the largest ship on the US merchant register.

Washingtonian had a single screw, driven by a quadruple-expansion steam engine that was rated at 704 NHP and gave her a speed of 12.5 knots (23 km/h). She had oil-fired boilers. Her cargo holds had a storage capacity of 490,858 cubic feet (13,900 m^{3}), and were refrigerated for her to carry perishable products from the West Coast to the East Coast, such as Pacific Northwest salmon or fresh produce from Southern California farms.

== Service ==
When Washingtonian began sailing for American-Hawaiian, the company shipped cargo from East Coast ports via the Tehuantepec Route to West Coast ports and Hawaii, and vice versa. Shipments on the Tehuantepec Route arrived at Mexican ports—Salina Cruz, Oaxaca, for eastbound cargo, and Coatzacoalcos, Veracruz, for westbound cargo—and traversed the Isthmus of Tehuantepec on the Tehuantepec National Railway. Eastbound shipments were primarily sugar and pineapple from Hawaii, while westbound cargoes were more general in nature. Washingtonian sailed in this service, but it is not known whether she sailed on the east or west side of North America. After the United States occupation of Veracruz on 21 April 1914 (which took place while six American-Hawaiian line ships were being held in various Mexican ports), the Huerta-led Mexican government closed the Tehuantepec National Railway to American shipping. This loss of access (the Panama Canal was not yet open until later that year) caused American-Hawaiian to return to its historic route of sailing around South America via the Strait of Magellan in late April. During the US occupation, the Washingtonian was chartered by the US Navy Department to serve as a non-commissioned refrigerator and supply ship for the US naval fleet off Mexico. She was outfitted for her first voyage at the New York Navy Yard and sailed with 500,000 pounds (230,000 kg) of fresh meat for the United States Navy and the US Army. Washingtonian sailed in a rotation with the commissioned Navy stores ships USS Culgoa and USS Celtic.

With the official opening of the Panama Canal on 15 August 1914, American-Hawaiian line ships switched to taking the isthmus canal route. In late August, American-Hawaiian announced that the Washingtonian—her Navy charter ended by this time—would sail on a San Francisco – Panama Canal – Boston route, sailing opposite vessels Mexican, Honolulan, and sister ship Pennsylvanian.

Washingtonian sailed from Los Angeles in early October with a load of California products—including canned and dried fruits, beans, and wine—for New York City and Boston. After delivering that load, Washingtonian then headed for Honolulu, Hawaii, to take on a 10,000-long-ton (10,000 t) load of raw sugar valued at about $1,000,000. Departing Honolulu on 20 December, Washingtonian arrived at Balboa on 17 January 1915 and transited the Panama Canal. Sailing from Cristóbal on the eastern end two days later, she headed for the Delaware Breakwater en route to Philadelphia.

== Collision ==
At 3:30 a.m. on 26 January, some 20 nautical miles (37 km) from Fenwick Island, Delaware, the American schooner Elizabeth Palmer (Note: Elizabeth Palmer was a five-masted, 300-foot-4-inch (91.54 m) wooden schooner built in Bath, Maine, in 1903, and considered one of the largest US sailing ships at the time. See: Shomette, p. 207.) was under full sail at 8 knots (15 km/h) on a southwest by south course. Elizabeth Palmer's captain saw a large steam vessel, Washingtonian, on an apparent collision course ahead, but did not change course since navigational rules require steam-powered vessels to yield to vessels under sail power. The captain of Washingtonian, two quartermasters, and a seaman were all on watch and saw Elizabeth Palmer, but misjudged the schooner's rapid pace. When Washingtonian, underway at 12 knots (22 km/h), did not change course or speed, Elizabeth Palmer collided with the starboard side of the steamer, leaving a large hole that sank Washingtonian ten minutes later. Less than a mile (2 km) away, Elizabeth Palmer, with her jib boom and the top of her foremast stripped away by the impact, began taking on water through her split seams. When it became apparent that the big schooner would sink, her captain ordered her abandonment, and she slowly settled and went down about an hour after the collision. After Washingtonian's crew abandoned ship, one crewman, a water tender, was found to be missing and was presumed drowned. Washingtonian's 39 survivors and all 13 crew members from Elizabeth Palmer were picked up about an hour after the collision by the passenger liner Hamilton of the Old Dominion Line, which arrived at New York the next day.

The collision had repercussions for American-Hawaiian and the world sugar market. The financial impact of the collision on American-Hawaiian, estimated at $2,000,000, was devastating. (Note: Washingtonian's captain and the company were at fault because navigation rules required that steam-powered vessels yield to sail-powered vessels. See: Shomette, p. 209.) Contemporary news reports in The New York Times and The Wall Street Journal both told of the collision's impact on the sugar market. Claus A. Spreckels, president of Federal Sugar Refining, noted that the loss of even such a large cargo would not normally have much effect on the sugar market. However, weather in Cuba, then the largest supplier of sugar for the United States, had reduced that island nation's crop by more than 200,000 tons. Further affecting the situation was World War I, then ongoing in Europe, (Note: The still-neutral United States did not enter World War I until April 1917.) which had reduced the tonnage of shipping available to transport commodities like sugar. With all of these factors, the asking price for sugar futures contracts for February 1915 delivery was 2.90 cents per pound (6.39 cents per kg) a week before Washingtonian's sinking, but had risen to 3.16 cents per pound (6.96 cents per kg) the day after the sinking.

Washingtonian's wreck, a skeletal framework of hull plates and bulkheads, lies upside down in about 100 feet (30 m) of water, and is one of the most-visited wreck sites along the eastern seaboard. (Note: Lying about a mile away from that of Washingtonian, the wreck of Elizabeth Palmer—"worm-eaten and disintegrating"—is, in contrast, little visited. See: Shomette, p. 212.) A popular night dive, Washingtonian's wreck is also a favorite with sport divers catching lobster.

== Bibliography ==
- Cochran, Thomas C.; Ray Ginger (December 1954). "The American-Hawaiian Steamship Company, 1899–1919". The Business History Review. 28 (4). Boston: The President and Fellows of Harvard College: 343–365. doi:10.2307/3111801. ISSN 0007-6805. JSTOR 3111801. OCLC 216113867. S2CID 154716297.
- Hovey, Edmund Otis (1907). "The Isthmus of Tehuantepec and the Tehuantepec National Railway". Bulletin of the American Geographical Society. 39 (2). New York: American Geographical Society: 78–91. doi:10.2307/198380. ISSN 0190-5929. JSTOR 198380. OCLC 2097765.
- Lloyd's Register of Shipping. Vol. I.–Steamers. London: Lloyd's Register of Shipping. 1914 – via Internet Archive.
- Shomette, Donald (2007). Shipwrecks, Sea Raiders, and Maritime Disasters Along the Delmarva Coast, 1632-2004. Baltimore: Johns Hopkins University Press. ISBN 978-0-8018-8670-6. OCLC 77573873.
