= Arizonan =

Arizonan may refer to:

- An Arizonan, something of or pertaining to the U.S. state of Arizona
- Arizonan, an adjective describing someone or something that is from or related to Arizona
- USS Arizonan (ID-4542A), a United States Navy cargo ship and troop transport in commission from 1918 to 1919
