= Zyrianin =

Zyrianin may refer to:

- Zyrianin, a Russian name for the Komi peoples
- SS Zyrianin, a Soviet cargo ship, earlier SS Dakotan
