= List of ships named USS Arizona =

Arizona has been the name of three ships of the United States Navy and will be the name of a future submarine.

- USS Arizona (1858), laid down in 1858 and served in the American Civil War.
- USS Neshaminy, launched in 1865 but never commissioned, was renamed Arizona in 1869.
- USS Arizona (BB-39) was a Pennsylvania-class battleship launched in 1915 and sunk by Japanese bomber aircraft in the attack on Pearl Harbor on 7 December 1941. Its wreck is the site of the USS Arizona memorial.
- USS Arizona (SSN-803), a planned Virginia-class nuclear attack submarine.

== See also ==
- USS Arizonan
- SS Arizona, a British passenger liner and holder of the eastbound Atlantic Record in 1879
- SS Grand Canyon State
