= MV Californian =

American cargo ship

- Sister ship Missourian

History
- Name: Californian (1921–40); Empire Kite (1940); Empire Seal (1940–42)
- Namesake: Inhabitants of California (1921–40)
- Owner: American-Hawaiian Steamship Co (1921–40); Ministry of War Transport (1940–42)
- Operator: American-Hawaiian Steamship Co (1921–40); Runciman (London) Ltd. (1940–42)
- Port of registry: New York, United States (1921-40); London, United Kingdom (1940-42)
- Builder: Merchant Shipbuilding Corporation
- Launched: 14 November 1921
- Completed: April 1922
- Maiden voyage: 19 May 1922
- Out of service: 19 February 1942
- Identification: Code Letters MDNF (1921–34); Code Letters WACB (1934–40); United States Official Number 222054 (1921-40); Code Letters GMSG (1940–42); United Kingdom Official Number 168021 (1940-42)
- Fate: Torpedoed and sunk, 19 February 1942

General characteristics
- Type: Cargo ship
- Tonnage: 7,899 gross register tons (GRT), 3,642 net register tons (NRT), 11,450 tons deadweight (DWT)
- Displacement: 16,500 tons
- Length: 461 ft 8 in (140.72 m) overall, 445 ft 1 in (135.66 m) between perpendiculars
- Beam: 59 ft 10 in (18.24 m)
- Draught: 28 ft 7 in (8.71 m)
- Installed power: 2 x B&W diesel engines, 4,500 ihp
- Propulsion: Twin screw propellers
- Speed: 12 knots (22 km/h)
- Notes: Sister ship Missourian

Location where Empire Seal was torpedoed and sunk

Californian was an early American motor cargo ship which was built in 1921 in Chester, Pennsylvania for the American-Hawaiian Steamship Company. She was sold to the British Ministry of War Transport in 1940 and renamed Empire Kite, and renamed Empire Seal later that year. She was torpedoed and sunk in February 1942.

== Description ==
The ship was 461 ft 8 in (140.72 m) long overall, 445 ft 1 in (135.66 m) between perpendiculars, with a beam of 59 ft 10 in (18.24 m). She had a depth of 39 ft 0 in (11.89 m), and a draught of 28 ft 7 in (8.71 m). She was assessed at 7,899 GRT, 3,642 NRT, 11,450 DWT and had a displacement of 16,500 tons.

The ship was propelled by two Burmeister & Wain four-stroke single acting diesel engines, which had six cylinders of 29 1/8 inches (74 cm) diameter by 45 1/4 inches (115 cm) stroke driving twin screw propellers, of 14 feet 0 inches (4.27 m) diameter and having four blades each. The engines were built by William Cramp & Sons, Philadelphia, Pennsylvania. They were each rated at 2,250 ihp at 115 rpm and could propel her at 12 knots (22 km/h).

The ship had five cargo holds, covered by seven hatches. The holds had a total capacity of 650,000 cubic feet (18,000 m^{3}). She had one 30-ton, one-10 ton, eleven-5 ton and eight-3 ton derricks. Hatches were 18 feet (5.49 m) wide, and up to 35 feet (10.67 m) long. Auxiliary power was provided by four 65-kilowatt (87 hp) generator sets, each driven by a two-cylinder diesel engine. No funnel was provided, two of her masts carried exhaust from her engines.

== History ==
Californian was built by the Merchant Shipbuilding Corporation, Chester, Pennsylvania for the American-Hawaiian Steamship Company. She was launched on 14 November 1921. Her engines were installed in February 1922. Californian was completed in April 1922. Her sea trials took place off the Delaware Capes on 1 and 2 May 1922.

Californian was delivered on 6 May. The United States Official Number 222054 and Code Letters MDNF were allocated. Her port of registry was New York. The introduction of Californian into service allowed American-Hawaiian to withdraw the steamships American, Nebraskan and Nevadan. She initially operated between ports on the west coast of the United States, Europe and New York. She departed from New York on 19 May on her 20,000 nautical miles (37,000 km) maiden voyage, which followed that route. She arrived at San Pedro, California on 7 June. A luncheon was held on board Californian on 9 June. It was attended by 300 guests. She then sailed to Seattle, Washington and Hamburg, Germany, where she arrived on 8 August. After calling at London, Glasgow and Liverpool, United Kingdom, Californian arrived back at New York on 22 September, having travelled 21,000 nautical miles (39,000 km).

In February 1923, Californian was withdrawn from the European route to trade between the American Atlantic and Pacific coast ports. In February 1924, Californian was drydocked at Bethlehem Shipbuilding San Pedro for painting. In January 1925, Californian was at Bethlehem Shipbuilding Corporation's Union Works for repairs to her propellers. She underwent minor repairs by Bethlehem Shipbuilding Corporation in January and October 1926.

Californian was drydocked at the Moore Dry Dock Company, Oakland, California in May 1930 for repairs to hull damage. She underwent minor repairs by Moore in September 1931. In November, her captain, William Lyons, who had been her captain since she entered service, retired after 60 years at sea. Lyons' retirement was a short one, he died at Yarmouth, Nova Scotia, Canada in August 1932. He was succeeded by Edelbert L. Smith, from the Minnesotan. Smith died in April 1932. In June, Californian underwent minor repairs by the Moor Dry Dock Company. Later that month, L. A Carlyle, captain of the Dakotan, was appointed captain of Californian. In December 1932, she again underwent repairs by Moore Dry Dock Company. In 1934, her Code Letters were changed to WACB. Californian was again drydocked at Moore's in November 1934 and July 1935 for miscellaneous repairs. She was drydocked in November 1936, June 1937, July 1938, June and November 1939 for routine repairs.

In summer 1940, Californian was one of 90 American ships sold to the British Ministry of War Transport. She departed from New Orleans, Louisiana for Bermuda on 14 August, arriving a week later. She joined Convoy BHX 68, which departed on 23 August and joined Convoy HX 68 at sea on 28 August. Convoy HX 68 had departed from Halifax, Nova Scotia, Canada on 24 August and arrived at Liverpool on 8 September. Californian was carrying a cargo of steel and scrap metal.

Californian was renamed Empire Kite. Her port of registry was London. The United Kingdom Official Number 168021 and Code Letters GMSG were allocated. She was operated under the management of Runciman (London) Ltd. Empire Kite was a member of Convoy OB 229, which departed from the Clyde on 15 October and dispersed at sea on 18 October. She left the convoy and put back to the Clyde, arriving on 16 October. She sailed again to join Convoy OB 231, which departed from Liverpool on 19 October and dispersed as sea on 23 October. Empire Kite was carrying general cargo and was bound for New York, where she arrived on 2 November. She sailed from New York on 17 November for Halifax, arriving on 19 November. Empire Kite joined Convoy HX 90, which departed on 21 November and arrived at Liverpool on 4 December. She was carrying a cargo of steel.

Empire Kite was then renamed Empire Seal. She departed from the Clyde on 23 January 1941 but put back the next day, having run aground. Following repairs, she sailed on 28 February join Convoy OB 291, which had departed from Liverpool the previous day and dispersed at sea on 3 March. She arrived at New York on 15 March. She sailed on 2 April but put back the next day. She departed on 11 May for Halifax, arriving on 14 May. Empire Seal joint Convoy HX 127, which sailed on 16 May and arrived at Liverpool on 2 June. She was carrying general cargo. She sailed with Convoy OB 339, which departed from Liverpool on 26 June and arrived at Halifax on 12 July. She continued on to New York, arriving on 18 July. Empire Seal sailed on 6 August, arriving at Halifax on 10 August. She then joined Convoy HX 145, which departed on 16 August and arrived at Liverpool on 31 August. She was carrying general cargo. She left the convoy and put in to the Clyde. Empire Seal departed from the Clyde on 25 September but put back that day.

Empire Seal departed from the Clyde on 31 December to join Convoy ON 52, which had departed from Liverpool that day and dispersed at sea on 11 January 1942. She arrived at the Hampton Roads, Virginia, United States on 25 January, sailing three days later and arriving at New York on 29 January. She departed from New York on 17 February. during the night of 19/20 February 1942, Empire Seal was torpedoed and sunk by U-96 off Cape Sable Island, Nova Scotia with the loss of one of her 57 crew. Survivors were rescued by the CAM ship Empire Flame. The crewman lost on board Empire Seal is commemorated on the Tower Hill Memorial, London.

== See also ==
- sister ship MV Missourian (1921)
