= American-Hawaiian Steamship Company =

American steamship company

- house flag
- Type: Private
- Industry: Shipping, transportation
- Founded: 1899
- Defunct: 1953 (shipping); 1968 (holding company)
- Fate: Bankruptcy
- Area served: Transatlantic
- Key people: George Dearborn (co-founder); Henry Lapham (co-founder)

The American-Hawaiian Steamship Company was an American steamship company founded in 1899 to carry cargoes of sugar from Hawaii to the United States and return with manufactured goods. It ceased operations as a transport company in 1953, but existed as a shell until 1968 as a holding company.

== History ==
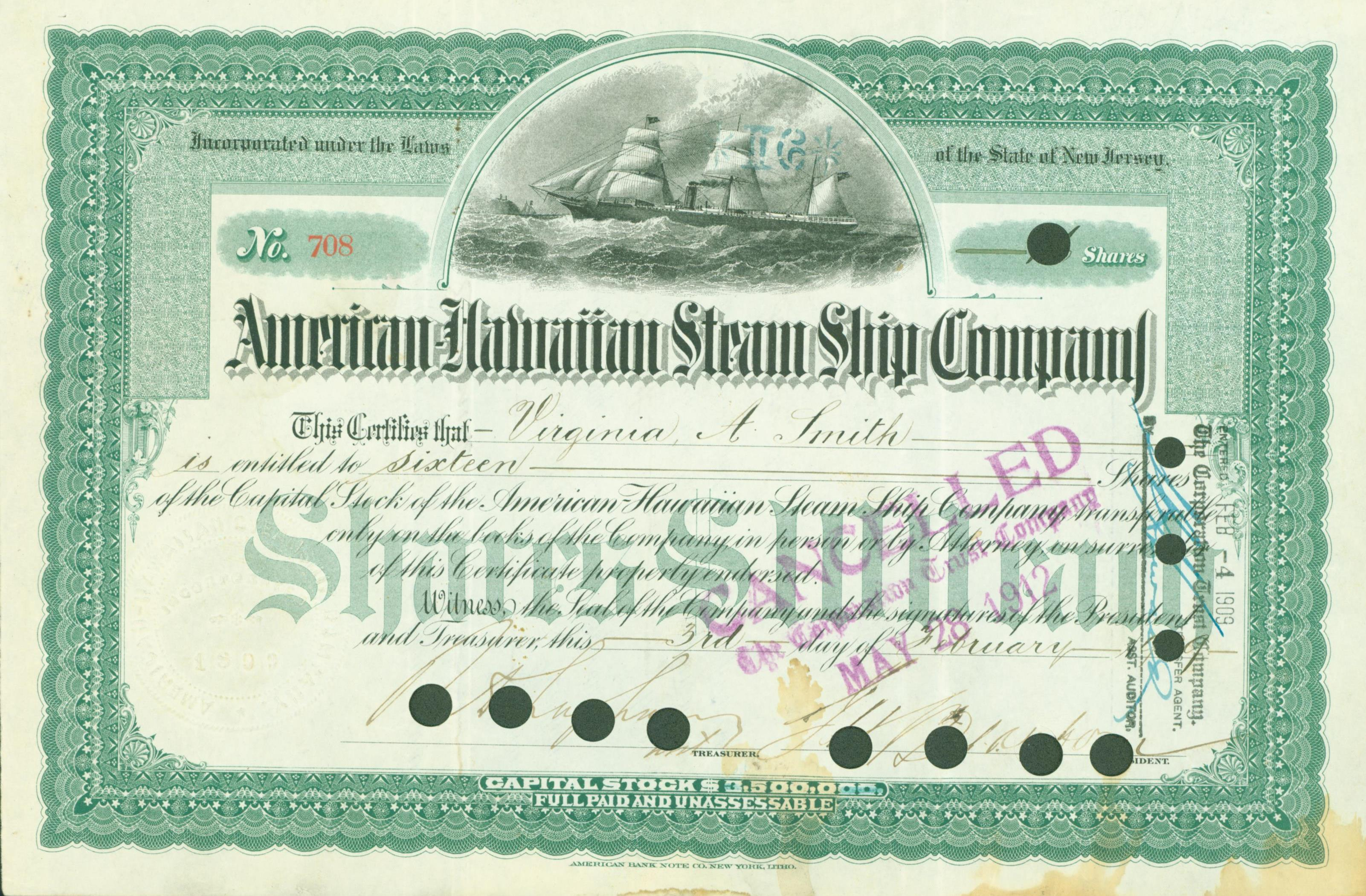
Share of the American-Hawaiian Steamship Company, issued 3 February 1909

Brothers-in-law George Dearborn and Lewis Henry Lapham were key in launching the company, which began with three ships, operated nine by 1904, and had seventeen by 1911 with three on order. At the time of the company's founding, its steamships sailed around South America via the Straits of Magellan to reach the East Coast ports. By 1907, the company began using the Mexican Isthmus of Tehuantepec Route. Shipments on the Tehuantepec Route would transship at Atlantic Port of Coatzacoalcos (formerly Puerto) or the Pacific Port of Salina Cruz and would traverse the Isthmus of Tehuantepec on the 310 kilometres (192.6 mi) Tehuantepec National Railway. The contract, binding until completion of the Panama Canal, with American-Hawaiian for its entire cargo moving between oceans and assuring a minimum of 500,000 tons of sugar and other cargo was important in the railway's economic plans from its beginning. For the steamship line the Tehuantepec route enabled the company to serve both a New York—Honolulu route and a coastal route from Salina Cruz to Pacific ports of the United States. With new ships to be delivered the company planned to have four 8,000 ton ships on the New York—Coatzacoalcos route, six 12,000 ton ships operating on the Salina Cruz—Honolulu route and two 6,000 ton ships serving the West Coast route.

Company ships were used on both the Pacific and Atlantic routes. When American political troubles with Mexico closed that route, American-Hawaiian returned to the Straits of Magellan route.

When the Panama Canal opened for traffic in August 1914, American-Hawaiian began routing all of its ships via this route. The temporary closure of the canal because of a series of landslides forced the company to return to the Straits of Magellan route for the third time in its history.

During World War I, twelve of the company's ships were commissioned into the United States Navy; a further five were sunk by submarines or mines during the conflict.

During World War II, the company operated twenty-six ships for the War Shipping Administration; 16 were torpedoed, one was sunk by kamikaze, one was sunk by a mine, and three were scuttled for breakwaters.

The line was taken over by shipping magnate Daniel K. Ludwig after World War II and ceased sailing operations in 1953, being operated as a holding company for other ventures until 1968.

Roger Dearborn Lapham, a future mayor of San Francisco, California, served as company president in the mid-1920s.

== Ships ==
- SS Alaskan
- SS Arkansan
- SS American
- SS Arizonan
- SS Californian
- MV Californian
- SS Coloradan
- SS Columbian
- SS Dakotan
- SS Delawarean
- SS Floridian
- SS Georgian
- SS Hawaiian
- SS Honolulan
- SS Indianan
- SS Iowan
- SS Kentuckian
- SS Mexican
- SS Minnesotan
- MV Missourian
- SS Montanan
- SS Nebraskan, built by Bremer Vulcan, Bremen-Vegesack for North German Lloyd in 1912 as Elsass. The ship was seized by the United States on 6 April 1917 at Pago Pago, Samoa coming under the control of the United States Shipping Board as Appeles and then renamed Kermit in 1920 before acquisition by American-Hawaiian on 5 March 1920 for the price of $538,881.99 and being named Nebraskan. On 9 February 1942 the ship was delivered by American-Hawaiian to the War Shipping Administration (WSA) for operation under United States Army Transportation Corps charter with American-Hawaiian as the WSA agent, until title was transferred to WSA on 2 December for delivery of the ship under Lend Lease to the Soviet Union where the ship became Sukhona until return to the WSA on 6 April 1944. Returned to the Nebraskan name the ship was allocated to the Army on 17 October 1944 until returned for layup in the Wilmington Reserve Fleet on 17 October 1946. The ship was used by the Army in the Pacific as a floating mobile warehouse.
- SS Ohioan
- SS Oregonian
- SS Panaman
- SS Pennsylvanian
- SS Texan
- SS Virginian
- SS Washingtonian

== World War II ==
In World War II the company operated ships under the War Shipping Administration, some of which were company owned and taken over by WSA as was Nebraskan, and others wartime built and delivered directly to WSA for operation by commercial agents.

- Alaskan November 28, 1942 torpedoed, 7 crew and one 1 US Navy Armed Guard killed
- Albert Gallatin January 2, 1944 torpedoed
- American June 11, 1942 torpedoed
- Arkansan June 15, 1942 torpedoed
- Benjamin Goodhue
- Chanute Victory
- Coloradan October 9, 1942 torpedoed
- Harrison Gray Otis August 4, 1943 mined while at anchor
- Honolulan July 22, 1942 torpedoed
- Illinoian July 28, 1944 scuttled as breakwater, Omaha Beach
- John Drake Sloat
- John Milledge
- Kentuckian August 12, 1944 scuttled as breakwater, Normandy
- Logan Victory April 6, 1945, sunk by kamikaze
- Marine Eagle.
- Montanan June 3, 1943 torpedoed
- Ohioan May 8, 1942 torpedoed
- Oklahoman April 8, 1942 torpedoed
- Oregonian September 13, 1942 torpedoed
- Pennsylvanian August 4, 1944 scuttled as breakwater, Omaha Beach
- Puerto Rican March 9, 1943 torpedoed
- San Juan November 11, 1943 torpedoed
- Texan March 11, 1942 torpedoed & shelled
- Washingtonian April 7, 1942 torpedoed
- William D. Burnham November 23, 1944 torpedoed
- William M. Marcy August 7, 1944 torpedoed

== After World War II ==
In the 1950s the company ceased sailing operations and was taken over by shipping magnate Daniel K. Ludwig, who used it as a holding company into the 1960s. Ventures at that time included the development of Westlake Village, California.

== See also ==
- World War II United States Merchant Navy

== Bibliography ==
- Cochran, Thomas C.; Ray Ginger (December 1954). "The American-Hawaiian Steamship Company, 1899–1919". The Business History Review. 28 (4). Boston: The President and Fellows of Harvard College: 343–365. doi:10.2307/3111801. JSTOR 3111801. OCLC 216113867. S2CID 154716297.
- Hovey, Edmund Otis (1907). "The Isthmus of Tehuantepec and the Tehuantepec National Railway". Bulletin of the American Geographical Society. 39 (January 1, 1907).
- Heubner, S. S. (September 1914). "Steamship Line Agreements and Affiliations in the American Foreign and Domestic Trade". Annals of the American Academy of Political and Social Science. 55.
- Johnson, Emory R. (1912). The Relation of the Panama Canal to the Traffic and Rates of American Railroads. United States Senate Reports. Washington, D.C.: United States Government Printing Office.
- Lloyds. "Lloyd's Register" (PDF). Lloyd's Register (through PlimsollShipData). Archived from the original (PDF) on February 12, 2015.
- Maritime Administration. "Nebraskan". Ship History Database Vessel Status Card. U.S. Department of Transportation, Maritime Administration. Archived from the original on February 11, 2015.
- Maritime Administration. "MARAD Vessel History Database". U.S. Department of Transportation, Maritime Administration. Archived from the original on February 21, 2014.
- San Francisco Maritime National Historical Park. "A guide to the Roger D. Lapham photograph collection, 1892-1956". Online Archive of California.
- schiffe-maxim.de. "Elsass (1912–1948)".
