= MV Missourian =

Early American motor cargo ship

- Missourian leaving the dock at Cramp's shipyard, Philadelphia, for New York, July 10, 1922

History
- Name: Missourian (1921–40); Empire Swan (1940–42); Belgian Freighter (1942–46); Capitaine Potié (1946–48); Genova (1948–55); Flaminia (1955–64); King Abdelaziz (1964–70)
- Namesake: Inhabitants of Missouri (1921–40); Genoa (1948–55); Abdulaziz of Saudi Arabia (1964–70)
- Owner: American-Hawaiian Steamship Co (1921–40); Ministry of War Transport (1940–42); Belgian government (1942–46); Compagnie Maritime Belge (1946–48); Compagnia Genovese d'Armamento (1948–62); Covena S.p.A (1962–64); Saudi Lines (1964–70)
- Operator: American-Hawaiian Steamship Co (1921–40); Runciman (London) Ltd. (1940–42); Compagnie Maritime Belge (1942–48); Compagnia Genovese d'Armamento (1948–62); Zim Lines (1962–64); Saudi Lines (1964–70)
- Port of registry: New York, United States (1921–40); London, United Kingdom (1940–42); Antwerp, Belgium (1942–48); Genoa, Italy (1948–64); Jeddah, Saudi Arabia (1964–70)
- Builder: Merchant Shipbuilding Corporation
- Yard number: 386
- Laid down: 10 February 1921
- Launched: 14 December 1921
- Completed: 6 July 1922
- Maiden voyage: 23 July 1922
- Out of service: 1970
- Identification: Code letters MDQP (1921–34); Code letters WACM (1934–40); United States Official Number 222236 (1921–40); Code letters GMQC (1940–42); United Kingdom Official Number 167635 (1940–42); Code letters ONVQ (1942–48); Code Letters IBNI (1948–62); Lloyd's Register number 511605 ( –1970)
- Fate: Scrapped

General characteristics
- Class & type: Cargo ship (1921–48); Passenger ship (1948–70)
- Tonnage: 7,899 gross register tons (GRT), 7,712 net register tons (NRT), 11,450 tons deadweight (DWT) (1921–48); 8,776 GRT (1955–70)
- Displacement: 16,500 tons (as built)
- Length: 461 ft 8 in (140.72 m) overall, 445 ft 1 in (135.66 m) between perpendiculars
- Beam: 59 ft 10 in (18.24 m)
- Draught: 28 ft 7 in (8.71 m) (1921–48); 26 ft 8 in (8.13 m) (1955–70)
- Depth: 39 ft (11.89 m)
- Installed power: 2 x B&W diesel engines, 4,500 ihp (1921–55); 2 x Cantieri Riuniti dell'Adriatico-Sulzer diesel engines, 7,200 bhp (1955–70)
- Propulsion: Twin screw propellers
- Speed: 12 knots (22 km/h) (1921–55); 14.5 knots (26.9 km/h) (1955–70)
- Capacity: 650,000 cubic feet (18,000 m^{3}) cargo space (1921–48); 860 passengers (1948–55); 1,024 passengers (1955–70)
- Notes: Rebuilt 1948, 1955; Sister ship Californian

Missourian was an early American motor cargo ship which was built in 1921 in Chester, Pennsylvania, for the American-Hawaiian Steamship Company. She was sold to the British Ministry of War Transport in 1940 and renamed Empire Swan. Transferred to the Belgian government in 1942, she was renamed Belgian Freighter. She was sold to the Compagnie Maritime Belge in 1946 and renamed Capitaine Potié.

She was sold to the Compagnia Genovese d'Armamento in 1948. Renamed Genova, she was rebuilt as a passenger ship. A further rebuild in 1955 and the fitting of new engines increased her service speed from 12 to 14.5 knots (22.2 to 26.9 km/h). She was renamed Flaminia. In 1964, she was sold to Saudi Lines and renamed King Abdelaziz. She served until 1970 when she was scrapped in Kaohsiung, Taiwan.

== Description ==
As built, the ship was 461 ft 8 in (140.72 m) long overall, 445 ft 1 in (135.66 m) between perpendiculars, with a beam of 59 ft 10 in (18.24 m). She had a depth of 39 ft 0 in (11.89 m), and a draught of 28 ft 7 in (8.71 m). She was assessed at 7,899 GRT, 7,712 NRT, 11,450 DWT and had a displacement of 16,500 tons.

The ship was propelled by two Burmeister & Wain four-stroke single acting diesel engines, which had six cylinders of 29 1/8 inches (74 cm) diameter by 45 1/4 inches (115 cm) stroke driving twin screws, of 14 feet 0 inches (4.27 m) diameter and having four blades each. The engines were built by William Cramp & Sons, Philadelphia, Pennsylvania. They were each rated at 2,250 ihp at 115 rpm and could propel her at 12 knots (22 km/h).

The ship had five cargo holds, covered by seven hatches. The holds had a total capacity of 650,000 cubic feet (18,000 m^{3}). She had one 30-ton, one 10-ton, eleven 5-ton and eight 3-ton derricks. Hatches were 18 feet (5.49 m) wide, and up to 35 feet (10.67 m) long. Auxiliary power was provided by four 65-kilowatt (87 hp) generator sets, each driven by a two-cylinder diesel engine. No funnel was provided; two of her masts carried exhaust from her engines.

== History ==
=== Missourian ===
Missourian was built as yard number 386 by the Merchant Shipbuilding Corporation, Chester, Pennsylvania, for the American-Hawaiian Steamship Company. Her keel was laid down on 10 February 1921. Originally scheduled for launching on 28 November 1921, she was launched on 14 December and delivered to William Cramp & Sons in June 1922 for the installation of her engines. The port engine was started for the first time on 1 July, and the starboard engine the next day. The engines had not been previously run before installation, a change to established practice. At the time of her launch, she was the largest motor vessel afloat. The United States Official Number 222236 and code letters MDQP were allocated. Her port of registry was New York. Her sea trials took place on 6 July after which final completion work was done. On 10 July Missourian left the shipyard for New York.

Initially operated between ports on the west coast of the United States, Europe and New York, Missourian made her maiden voyage, from New York to California, on 23 July 1922. Her first round trip was completed in December and was pronounced a success. The ship had sailed for more than 20,000 nautical miles (37,000 km), consuming between 112 and 114 barrels of oil a day. (Note: A barrel of oil is 42 US gallons (35 imp gal; 160 L). Therefore consumption was 4,704 to 4,788 US gallons (3,917 to 3,987 imp gal; 17,810 to 18,120 L) per day.) On the last leg, from Hamburg, Germany, to New York, her average speed was in excess of 12 knots (22 km/h). In 1923, she was withdrawn from the San Pedro – New York – Hamburg route to operate between ports on the west coast and the east coast of the United States. In November 1923, Missourian was drydocked at San Francisco for minor repairs. On 3 June 1928, Missourian hosted a luncheon for officers and members of the Associated Traffic Clubs of America at San Pedro.

In May 1932, Missourian sprang a leak whilst on a voyage from San Francisco to Portland, Oregon. She put back to San Francisco and was drydocked for repairs. Her code letters were changed to WACM in 1934. On 1 November 1935, the steamship Nevadan lost her propeller 1,200 nautical miles (2,200 km) south east of San Francisco. She was subsequently taken in tow by Missourian, which later handed over the tow to the tug Peacock.

=== Empire Swan ===
In summer 1940, Missourian was one of 90 American ships sold to the British Ministry of War Transport. Sailing under the British flag, she reached the United Kingdom as part of Convoy HX 59, which departed from Halifax, Nova Scotia, Canada on 19 July and arrived at Liverpool, Lancashire, on 3 August. Missourian was carrying a cargo of ammunition and scrap metal. She was renamed Empire Swan and placed under the management of Runciman (London) Ltd. Her port of registry was London. The United Kingdom Official Number 167635 and code letters GMQC were allocated.

Empire Swan departed from the Clyde on 8 September to join Convoy OB210, which had departed from Liverpool that day and dispersed at sea on 10 September. She was carrying general cargo. Over the next 20 months, Empire Swan sailed between the United Kingdom and North America. She was a member of convoys HX 79, OB 235, OB 291, HX 123, OG 65, HX 150, ON 9, HX 152, ON 32, HX 165, BB 117, ON 63, HX 179, ON 83 and HX 189, which was her last convoy under the British flag. Convoy HX 189 departed from Halifax on 10 May 1942 and arrived at Liverpool on 20 May. She was carrying general cargo.

=== Belgian Freighter, Capitaine Potié ===
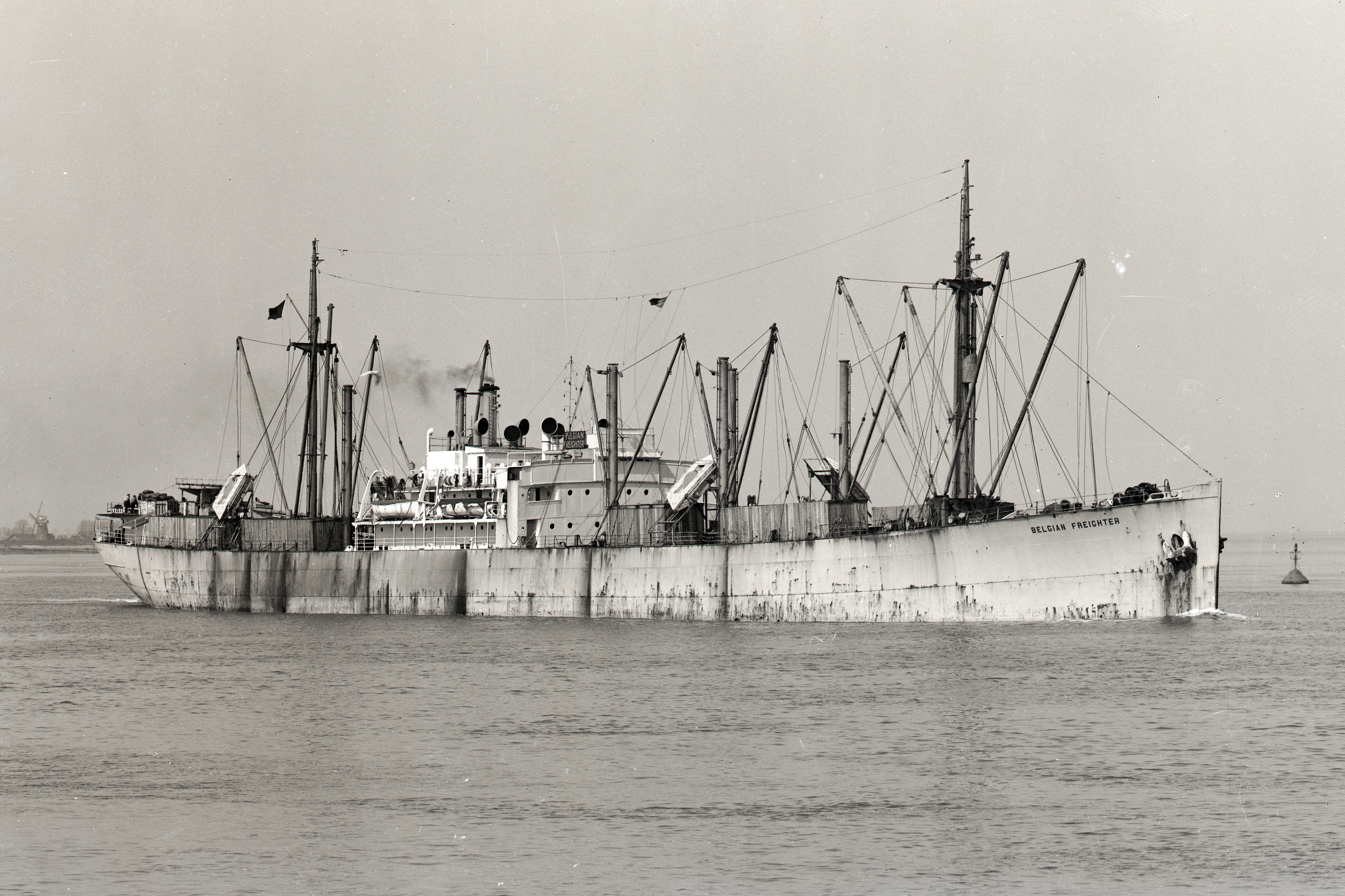
Belgian Freighter on the river Scheldt (1945)

Empire Swan was one of seven ships sold in 1942 to the Belgian government to replace war losses. She was renamed Belgian Freighter. (Note: The others became Belgian Airman, Belgian Fighter, Belgian Fisherman, Belgian Sailor, Belgian Seaman and Belgian Soldier.) She was placed under the management of the Compagnie Maritime Belge. Her port of registry was Antwerp and the code letters ONVQ were allocated.

Belgian Freighter spent much of the war sailing between the United Kingdom and North America, with a visit to Gibraltar in December 1942 and Casablanca, Morocco in January 1943. She visited Antwerp in March 1945. Belgian Freighter was a member of convoys ON 109, ON 111, BX 34, HX 204, ON 133, HX 213, KMS 5G, CG 10, MKS 7, WN 397, FS 1048, FN 969, EN 206, ON 174, HX 236, ON 187, HX 247, ON 196, HX 256, HX 257, ONS 21, XB 82, SC 148, ON 221, HX 283, ON 231, HX 292, WN 590, FS 1483, FN 1409, FN 1416, HX 304, ON 254, HX 355 and TAM 183. In 1946, Belgian Freighter was sold to the Compagnie Maritime Belge and was renamed Capitaine Potié. (Note: Maurice Potié was the captain of Compagnie Maritime Belge's steamship Gandia who was killed when she was torpedoed and sunk by U-135 on 22 January 1941.) She sailed between Belgium, the Belgian Congo and South America.

=== Genova ===
In May 1948, Capitaine Potié was sold to the Compagnia Genovese d'Armamento (Cogedar), the first ship to be purchased by Cogedar. She was rebuilt at Monfalcone as a passenger ship and renamed Genova. Accommodation for 860 passengers was provided. Her port of registry was Genoa and the Code Letters IBNI were allocated. She operated on the Genoa – River Plate route. Passengers were carried southward and freight was carried northward, the conversion being designed to allow this.

=== Flaminia ===
In 1955 Genova was again rebuilt at Monfalcone. Her Burmeister & Wain engines were replaced by two five-cylinder Cantieri Riuniti dell'Adriatico-Sulzer diesel engines. Rated at 7,200 bhp, they increased her service speed to 14.5 knots (26.9 km/h). Her draught had been reduced to 26 ft 8 in (8.13 m) and she was now assessed at 8,776 GRT. Renamed Flaminia, She accommodated 1,024 passengers. She was used on the Genoa – Australia route. Flaminia retained Genoa as her port of registry and IBNI as her Code Letters.

Flaminia made her first voyage post-rebuild from Venice to Cairns, Queensland, Australia, arriving in June 1955. She transported 800 Italian migrants. She was then chartered by the French government as a troopship. In July 1955, as she passed through the Suez Canal, 67 legionnaires deserted by jumping overboard as they were being transported from France to French Indo-China. In February 1957, a vibration in her starboard propeller shaft forced that engine to be shut down whilst the ship was in the Indian Ocean, bringing 946 Hungarian migrants to Australia. She put in to Fremantle, Western Australia. Alternative transport by air or rail was arranged for her passengers. In 1958, Don Gonzalo, Prince of Spain travelled on Flaminia to Australia on holiday. He left the ship at Sydney, rejoining a week later at Perth to return home. In July 1959, Flaminia was caught up in a worldwide strike by Italian seamen when she arrived at Melbourne. Her crew were not members of the striking Italian Maritime Union and did not join the strike. Victualling the ship was severely affected by picketing strikers. Her passengers were sent on to Sydney and Brisbane by air or rail. A police guard was placed upon the vessel. In August, she was chartered by the Australian government as a troopship to return soldiers from Malaya to Australia for Christmas. The troops had been taking part in the Malayan Emergency, fighting against communist insurgents of the Malayan National Liberation Army. Flaminia sailed from Penang for Australia on 5 October with the first of the returning troops. She arrived at Brisbane on 18 October.

In February 1960, Flaminia transported the 25,000th emigrant, Alfred Bayliss, under the Malta-Australia assisted passages agreement from Malta to Australia. On departure from Valletta, 29-year-old Bayliss, his wife and their two children were given VIP treatment by the Maltese government. Flaminia was again chartered by the Australian government as a troopship in 1961. Flaminia caught fire off the Italian coast in the early 1960s, but was repaired. In 1962, Flaminia was chartered to Zim Line, operating on the Marseille – Haifa route. Whilst on charter, she was sold to Covena S.p.A, Genoa. Codega buying Media from Cunard Line to replace her. In March 1963, Flaminia was chartered to transport Jewish migrants from Argentina to Israel. In September 1964, she was chartered to transport Jewish migrants from Tunisia to Israel.

=== King Abdelaziz ===
In October 1964, Flaminia was sold to Saudi Lines, Jeddah. She was renamed King Abdelaziz. On 30 April 1965, she ran aground on the Alagham Reef, 5 nautical miles (9.3 km) west of Jeddah. Her passengers were taken off. She was refloated a few days later and taken to La Spezia, Italy, for repairs, which took until September to complete. With their introduction in the 1960s, she was allocated the Lloyd's Register Number 511605. King Abdelaziz was sold in 1970. She arrived at Kaohsiung, Taiwan, on 23 March, or 23 April for breaking.

== See also ==
- sister ship MV Californian (1921)
