= USS Mexican =

Cargo ship of the United States Navy

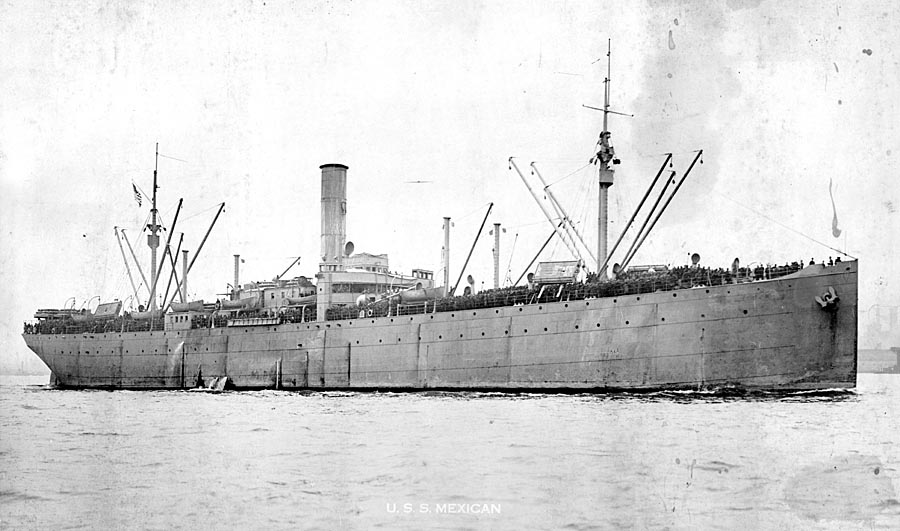
- USS Mexican arriving at New York City in 1919 with her decks packed with troops returning to the United States after World War I service in Europe.

History

United States
- Name: USS Mexican
- Namesake: Previous name retained
- Builder: Union Iron Works, San Francisco, California
- Launched: 29 December 1906
- Completed: 1907
- Acquired: 23 December 1917
- Commissioned: 23 December 1917
- Decommissioned: 4 August 1919
- Fate: Returned to owners 4 August 1919
- Notes: In commercial service as SS Mexican 1907-1917 and 1919-1948; Scrapped 1948

General characteristics
- Type: Cargo ship and troop transport
- Tonnage: 8,673 gross register tons
- Displacement: 19,550 tons
- Length: 488 ft 3 in (148.82 m)
- Beam: 57 ft 2 in (17.42 m)
- Draft: 31 ft 6 in (9.60 m)
- Propulsion: Steam engine
- Speed: 13 knots (maximum)
- Complement: 108
- Armament: 1 × 6-inch (152-millimeter) gun; 1 × 6-pounder gun

USS Mexican (ID-1655) was a United States Navy cargo ship and animal transport in commission from 1917 to 1919. She operated as the commercial steamship SS Mexican from 1907 to 1917 and from 1919 to 1948.

== Construction ==
SS Mexican was built in 1907 at San Francisco, California, by the Union Iron Works as a commercial cargo ship for the American-Hawaiian Steamship Company of New York City.

== World War I ==
The United States Department of War acquired Mexican for World War I service on a bareboat charter basis on 10 December 1917. On 23 December 1917, the Department of War transferred Mexican to the U.S. Navy, which gave her the naval registry Identification Number (Id. No.) 1655 and commissioned her the same day as USS Mexican.

Manned by U.S. Navy personnel and operated on a United States Army account, Mexican was assigned to the Naval Overseas Transportation Service and served as an animal transport through the end of World War I.

Mexican was in port at St. Nazaire, France on 13 May 1918 when a fire broke out aboard her. Lookouts aboard the cargo ship USS Alaskan (ID-4542), lying directly astern of Mexican, spotted the fire breaking out. Alaskan called away her fire and rescue party, which aided Mexican's men in controlling the blaze before it did serious damage.

On 13 December 1918, Mexican was transferred to the Cruiser and Transport Force for use as a troop transport. Refitted for that purpose by the U.S. Army, she steamed on round-trip voyages from the United States East Coast to Europe for several months in 1919, bringing American troops who had completed their war service in Europe home to the United States.

The Navy returned Mexican to the American-Hawaiian Steamship Company on 4 August 1919. She returned to commercial service as SS Mexican.

== World War II ==
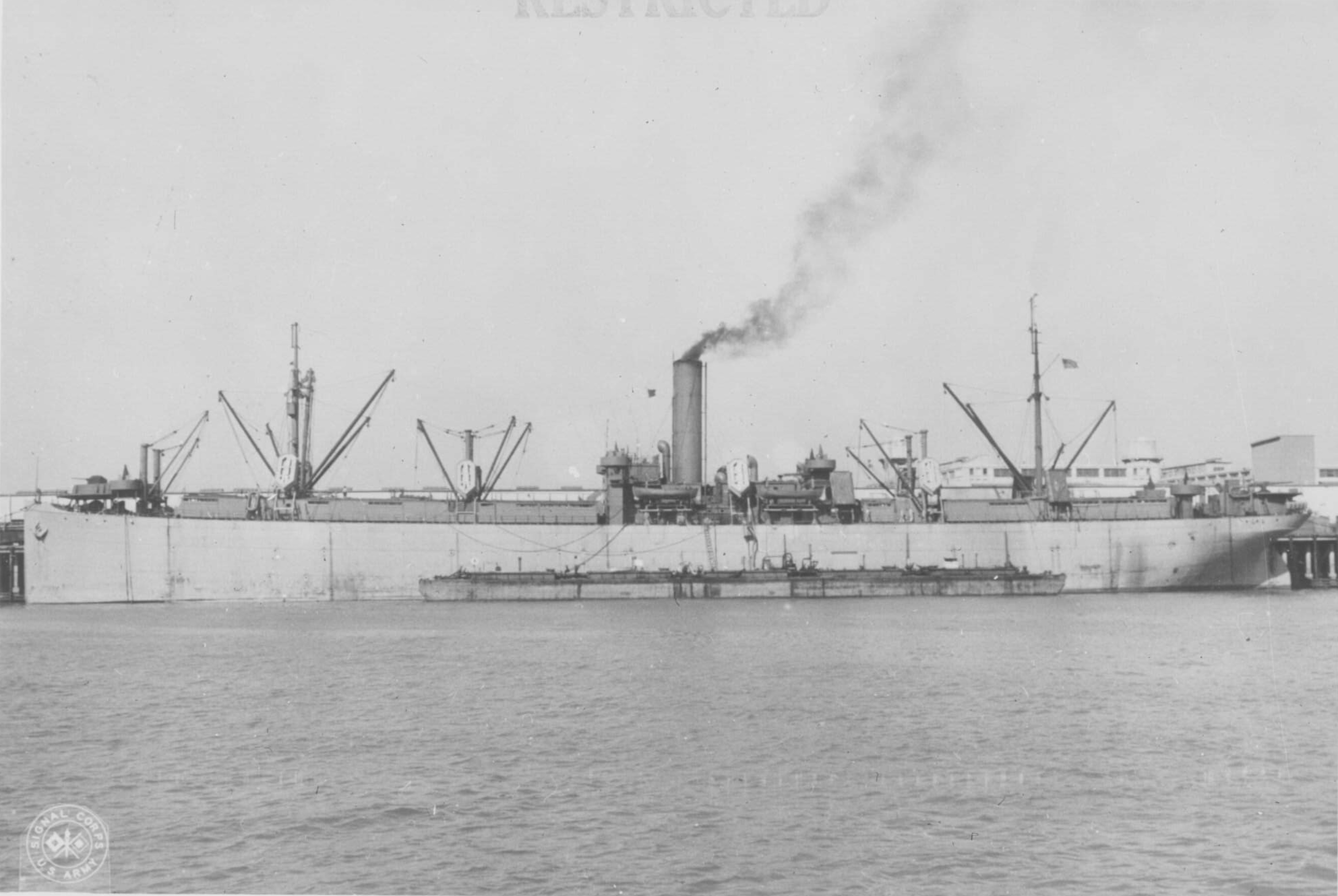
Mexican during World War II

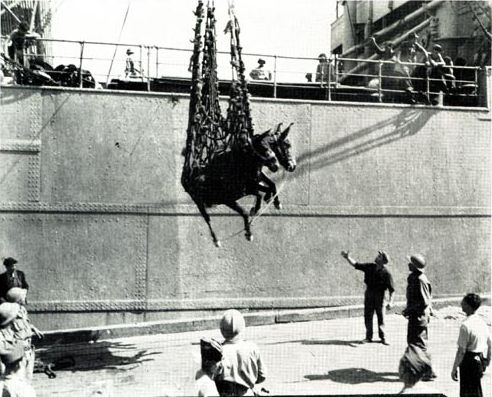
A ship unloading a U.S. Army mule in Naples, Italy, in September 1944

The U.S. War Shipping Administration converted Mexican to an animal transport ship from late August to October 1944. Departing on 22 October 1944 she moved 648 mules and six horses from Port of New Orleans, Louisiana, to Calcutta, India, a 58-day trip. For the remainder of World War II she moved mules and horses for the war effort.

== Relief and "seagoing cowboys" ==
In 1946, Mexican was used as livestock ship, informally also called a "cowboy ship." From 1945 to 1947 the United Nations Relief and Rehabilitation Administration and the Brethren Service Committee of the Church of the Brethren – which had founded its Heifers for Relief project, in 1942; in 1953 this became Heifer International – sent livestock to war-torn countries in the aftermath of World War II. These "seagoing cowboys" made about 360 trips on 73 different ships. SS Mexican was one of these ships, and she moved livestock across the Atlantic Ocean. Mexican made several trips and took horses, several thousand baby chicks, and bales of hay to Poland on each trip. Mexican moved horses, heifers, and mules as well as some chicks, rabbits, and goats.

== Disposal ==
SS Mexican was scrapped in 1948.
