= SS Chanute Victory =

United States Merchant Marine ship

- Typical Victory Ship.

History

United States
- Name: SS Chanute Victory
- Namesake: Octave Chanute
- Owner: War Shipping Administration
- Operator: American-Hawaiian Steamship Company
- Builder: California Shipbuilding Company, Los Angeles
- Laid down: November 29, 1944
- Launched: January 19, 1945
- Completed: February 20, 1945
- Fate: Sold in 1947

Netherlands
- Name: SS Alphacca in 1947
- Operator: N.V.Van Nievelt, Goudriaan & Co, Rotterdam.
- Fate: Sold in 1964

Taiwan
- Name: SS Hai-Fu 1964
- Acquired: China Merchants S.N.Co, Port of Keelung
- Fate: Sold in 1973

Taiwan
- Name: SS Kai-Ming 1973
- Acquired: Yang Ming Marine Transport Co, Taipei
- Renamed: SS Ming Cathay in 1977
- Identification: IMO number: 5012448
- Fate: Scrapped in 1978 at Kaohsiung, Taiwan.

General characteristics
- Class & type: VC2-S-AP3 Victory ship
- Tonnage: 7612 GRT, 4,553 NRT
- Displacement: 15,200 tons
- Length: 455 ft (139 m)
- Beam: 62 ft (19 m)
- Draught: 28 ft (8.5 m)
- Installed power: 8,500 shp (6,300 kW)
- Propulsion: HP & LP turbines geared to a single 20.5-foot (6.2 m) propeller
- Speed: 16.5 knots
- Boats & landing craft carried: 4 Lifeboats
- Complement: 62 Merchant Marine and 28 US Naval Armed Guards
- Armament: 1 × 5 inch (127 mm)/38 caliber gun; 1 × 3 inch (76 mm)/50 caliber gun; 8 × 20 mm Oerlikon

The SS Chanute Victory was a Victory ship built during World War II under the Emergency Shipbuilding program. She was launched by the California Shipbuilding Company on January 19, 1945, and completed on February 20, 1945. The ship's United States Maritime Commission designation was VC2- S- AP3, hull number 79 (V44).

== World War II ==
SS Chanute Victory served as a troop ship in the Atlantic and Pacific Oceans during World War II. She was operated by the American-Hawaiian SS Company. Just before the end of the war, the Chanute Victory's Captain Larz Neilson steamed out of New York City to take new troops to Europe. But, three day out she was told to turn around and go home, back up the East River, as the war was nearing an end in Europe. She served as a troop ship again, but as part of Operation Magic Carpet to bring troops home. SS Chanute Victory and 96 other Victory ships were converted to troop ships to bring the US soldiers home at the end of World War II. Some of her noted trips: Chanute Victory returned 1,403 Army veterans to San Francisco from Yokohama, Japan on Jan. 24, 1946. On May 17, 1946 she arrived in New York City returning Army veterans to the States. December 1946 she sailed from Piraeus, Greece to Genoa, Italy, then to Lisbon, Portugal picking up troops and returning them to New York. Chanute Victory, returned 1061 troops from Bremen, Germany on June 25, 1946 . In December 1945 she returned troop home from Le Havre, France.

== Post war ==
After the war in 1947 she was sold to N.V.Van Nievelt, Goudriaan & Co, of Rotterdam, Netherlands and renamed SS Alphacca. In 1964 she was sold to China Merchants S.N.Co, in Port of Keelung, Taiwan and renamed SS Hai-Fu . In 1973 she was sold to Yang Ming Marine Transport Company in Taipei, Taiwan and renamed SS Kai Ming. In 1977 Yang Ming Marine Transport Company renamed her the SS Ming Cathay. In 1978 she was scrapped at Kaohsiung, Taiwan.

== See also ==
- List of Victory ships
- Liberty ship
- Type C1 ship
- Type C2 ship
- Type C3 ship

== Sources ==
- Sawyer, L.A. and W.H. Mitchell. Victory ships and tankers: The history of the ‘Victory’ type cargo ships and of the tankers built in the United States of America during World War II, Cornell Maritime Press, 1974, 0-87033-182-5.
- United States Maritime Commission:
- Victory Cargo Ships
