= USS Eastern Light =

Japanese-built cargo ship

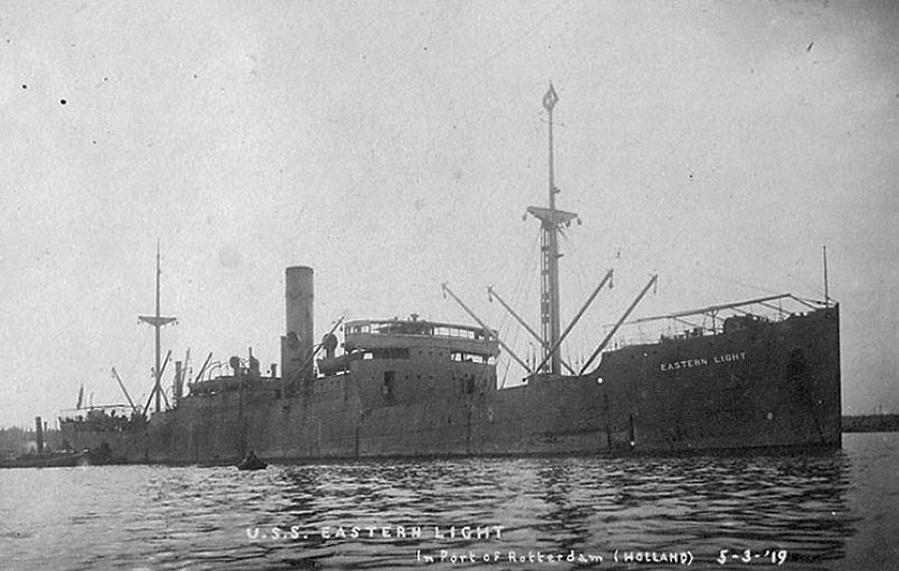
- USS Eastern Light at Rotterdam, 5 March 1919

History

United States
- Name: 1918: Eastern Light; 1926: Willkeno; 1937: Isthmian; 1939: Illinoian; 1944: Blockship 485
- Owner: 1918: US Shipping Board; 1926: AMM Steam Ship Corp; 1928: Williams SS Corp; 1937: American–Hawaiian SS Co
- Operator: 1918–19: US Navy
- Port of registry: 1918: Seattle; 1926: Wilmington, Delaware; 1928: New York
- Builder: Osaka Iron Works, Innoshima
- Cost: $2,408,625
- Yard number: 951
- Completed: September 1918
- Acquired: for US Navy, 6 Nov 1918
- Commissioned: into US Navy, 6 Dec 1918
- Decommissioned: from US Navy, 16 Apr 1919
- Identification: US official number 217292; 1918–19: ID number ID–3538; 1918–33: code letters LPBH; by 1934: call sign WKII
- Fate: scuttled, 1944

General characteristics
- Class & type: EFC Design 1127 cargo ship
- Tonnage: 7,192 GRT, 5,477 NRT, 10,500 DWT
- Displacement: 12,105 tons
- Length: 429 ft (131 m) overall; 415.0 ft (126.5 m) registered
- Beam: 55.5 ft (16.9 m)
- Draft: 27 ft 6 3/4 in (8.4 m)
- Depth: 34.6 ft (10.5 m)
- Decks: 1
- Installed power: 553 NHP, 3,200 ihp
- Propulsion: 1 × triple-expansion engine; 1 × screw
- Speed: 10 1/2 knots (19 km/h)
- Range: 1,612 nmi (2,985 km) on permanent bunkers; 6,047 nmi (11,199 km) on total bunkers
- Capacity: 574,349 cubic feet (16,264 m^{3}) grain; 524,918 cubic feet (14,864 m^{3}) bale; 5,000,000 ft (1,500,000 m) lumber
- Complement: in US Navy: 70
- Sensors & processing systems: by 1937: wireless direction finding
- Notes: sister ships: Eastern Admiral, Eastern Knight, Eastern Mariner, Eastern Sailor

USS Eastern Light (ID-3538) was an Emergency Fleet Corporation (EFC) Design 1127 cargo steamship that was built in Japan in 1918 for the United States Shipping Board (USSB). From December 1918 to April 1919 she spent five months in the United States Navy. In 1926 she was sold and renamed Willkeno. She was renamed Isthmian in 1937 and Illinoian in 1939. in 1944 she was scuttled off the coast of Normandy as Blockship 485.

== Building ==
The Osaka Iron Works Company in Innoshima, Hiroshima built Eastern Light as yard number 951. The USSB paid $2,408,625 for her, plus $23,035 for "Repairs and Equipment". She was completed in September 1918. Her lengths were 429 ft (131 m) overall and 415.0 ft (126.5 m) registered. Her beam was 55.5 ft (16.9 m), her depth was 34.6 ft (10.5 m), and her draft was 27 ft 6 3/4 in (8.4 m). Her hull had Isherwood-type longitudinal framing. Her five holds had capacity for 574,349 cubic feet (16,264 m^{3}) of grain, or 524,918 cubic feet (14,864 m^{3}) of baled cargo. Her tonnages were 7,192 GRT, 5,477 NRT, 10,500 DWT, and 12,105 tons displacement.

Eastern Light had a single screw, driven by a three-cylinder triple-expansion engine. It was rated at 553 NHP or 3,200 ihp, and gave her a speed of 10 1/2 knots (19 km/h). Her permanent bunkers had capacity for 390 tons of coal, and her reserve bunkers had capacity for 1,058 tons. Burning an estimated 60 tons of coal per day, this gave her a range of 1,612 nautical miles (2,985 km) on permanent bunkers, and 6,047 nautical miles (11,199 km) on total bunkers. The USSB registered Eastern Light in Seattle. Her US official number was 217292 and her code letters were LPBH.

Osaka Iron Works built four sister ships for the USSB to the same EFC Design 1127. Eastern Knight and Eastern Mariner were completed in 1919, followed by Eastern Admiral and Eastern Sailor in 1920.

== USS Eastern Light ==
The US Navy acquired the ship from the USSB on 6 November 1918, and had her converted for naval use at Puget Sound Naval Shipyard in Bremerton, Washington. On 6 December she was commissioned as USS Eastern Light, with the Naval Registry Identification Number ID–3538.

Eastern Light loaded flour and other stores at Tacoma, and left Seattle on 29 December. She reached Norfolk, Virginia on 9 February 1919, and loaded cargo for the United States Food Administration. She crossed the North Atlantic, called at Falmouth, Cornwall on 13 February, and reached Rotterdam on 5 March. Her cargo was transhipped onto barges for the Commission for Relief in Belgium.

Eastern Light returned to the USA ballasted with sand. She called en route at Plymouth, England, and reached New York on 10 April, after a crossing of 16 days. On 16 April the Navy decommissioned her and returned her to the USSB.

== Willkeno ==
In November 1926 the American Merchant Marine Steam Ship Corporation announced that it would buy Eastern Light, Eastern Admiral, and Eastern Mariner for $175,000 each. It intended each ship to carry cargoes of 5,000,000 ft (1,500,000 m) of lumber. And it intended to convert each ship from coal to oil fuel. They were renamed Willkeno, Willboro, and Willzipo respectively, as the company was in joint liability with the Williams Steam Ship Corporation. The three ships were registered in Wilmington, Delaware.

In 1928 the Williams SS Corp absorbed the American Merchant Marine SS Corp, and registered the ships in New York. By 1934 Willkeno's wireless telegraph call sign was WKII, and this had replaced her code letters.

== Isthmian and Illinoian ==
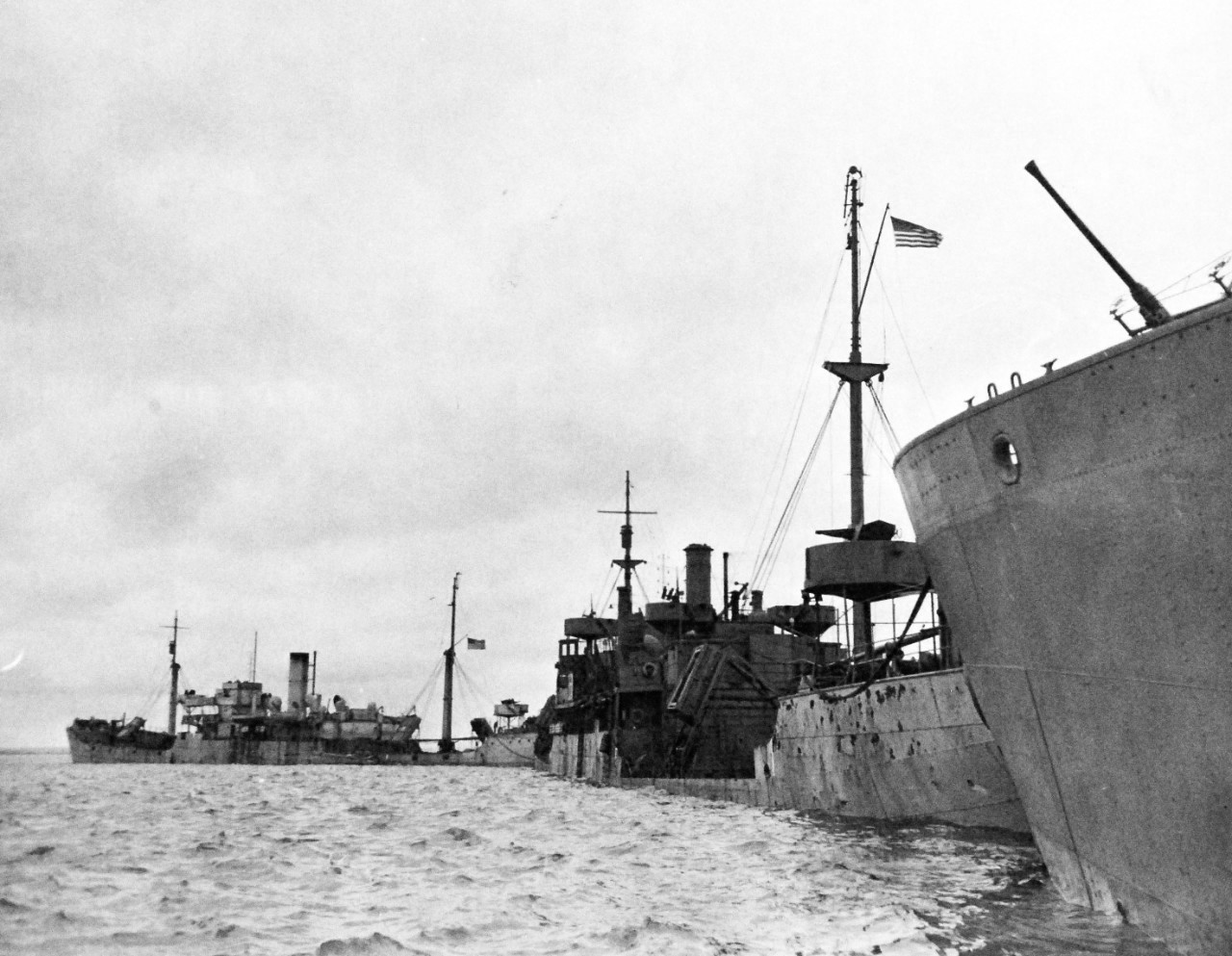
A gooseberry breakwater off the Normandy coast in June 1944

In 1937 the American-Hawaiian Steamship Company acquired Willkeno, Willboro, and Willzipo and renamed them Isthmian, Coloradan, and Washingtonian respectively. Also by 1937, Isthmian's navigation equipment included wireless direction finding. In December 1937 the American–Hawaiian SS Co announced that it was laying up three ships including Isthmian, and was considering laying up two others.

In 1939 the American–Hawaiian SS Co renamed the ship Illinioan. In July 1941 Illinoian took war materiél to India. On 7 December 1941 she was under way from New Orleans to Baltimore when Japan attacked Pearl Harbor.

In June, July, or August 1944 (sources differ), Illinioan was scuttled off Omaha Beach to reinforce the Gooseberry 2 breakwater.

== Bibliography ==
- Lloyd's Register of Shipping. Vol. II.–Steamers. London: Lloyd's Register of Shipping. 1919 – via Internet Archive.
- Lloyd's Register of Shipping. Vol. II.–Steamers. London: Lloyd's Register of Shipping. 1921 – via Internet Archive.
- Lloyd's Register of Shipping. Vol. II.–Steamers and Motorships. London: Lloyd's Register of Shipping. 1926 – via Internet Archive.
- Lloyd's Register of Shipping (PDF). Vol. II.–Steamers and Motorships of 300 tons gross and over. London: Lloyd's Register of Shipping. 1930 – via Southampton City Council.
- Lloyd's Register of Shipping (PDF). Vol. II.–Steamers and Motorships of 300 tons gross and over. London: Lloyd's Register of Shipping. 1934 – via Southampton City Council.
- Lloyd's Register of Shipping (PDF). Vol. II.–Steamers and Motorships of 300 tons gross and over. London: Lloyd's Register of Shipping. 1937 – via Southampton City Council.
- Lloyd's Register of Shipping (PDF). Vol. II.–Steamers and Motorships of 300 tons. Trawlers, Tugs, Dredgers, &c. Sailing Vessels. Shipowners, &c. London: Lloyd's Register of Shipping. 1939 – via Southampton City Council.
