= SS Empire Flame =

World War II merchant ship of the United Kingdom

History
- Name: Empire Flame (1941–45); Dunkery Beacon (1945–55); Rissa (1955–61); Augusta Paulin (1961–69)
- Owner: Ministry of War Transport (1941–45); Crawford Shipping Co Ltd (1945–55); OY Laurus AB (1955–61); Paulins Rederi AB (1961–69)
- Operator: Booth Steamship Co Ltd (1941–45); Crawford Shipping Co Ltd (1945–55); Rolf Simberg (1955–61); Kommanditbolaget Ab Paulin Chartering Oy & Co Kommandiittiyhtiö (1961–69)
- Port of registry: Liverpool, United Kingdom (1941–45); (United Kingdom) London (1945–55); Helsinki, Finland (1955–61); (Finland) Turku (1961–67); (Finland) Nagu (1967–69)
- Builder: Cammell Laird & Co Ltd
- Yard number: 1060
- Launched: 12 May 1941
- Completed: June 1941
- Maiden voyage: 24 June 1941
- Out of service: 1969
- Identification: United Kingdom Official Number 166391 (1941–55); Finnish Official Number 1170 (1955–61); Finnish Official Number 1396 (1961–69); Code Letters BCLF (1941–55); Code Letters OFVN (1955-69); IMO number: 5030608 (1960s–69)
- Fate: Scrapped

General characteristics
- Class & type: CAM ship (1941–43); Cargo ship (1943–69)
- Tonnage: 7,069 GRT (1941–55), 7,095 GRT (1955–69); 5,194 NRT (1941–55), 4,513 NRT (1955–69); 9,905 DWT (1941–63), 10,063 DWT (1963–69)
- Length: 432 ft 2 in (131.72 m)
- Beam: 56 ft 2 in (17.12 m)
- Draught: 26 ft 3 in (8.00 m)
- Depth: 34 ft 2 in (10.41 m)
- Ice class: Ice class II (1962–68)
- Propulsion: Triple expansion steam engine, single screw propeller
- Speed: 10 knots (19 km/h)
- Armament: 1 x Hawker Sea Hurricane (1941–43)

Empire Flame was a 7,069 GRT CAM ship that was built in 1941 by Cammell Laird & Co Ltd, Birkenhead, United Kingdom for the Ministry of War Transport (MoWT). She was sold in 1945 and renamed Dunkery Beacon. A further sale to Finland in 1955 saw her renamed Rissa. Following a sale in 1961, she was renamed Augusta Paulin. She served until 1969 when she was scrapped.

== Description ==
The ship was a CAM ship built in 1941 by Cammell Laird & Co Ltd, Birkenhead, Cheshire, United Kingdom. She was yard number 1060.

The ship was 432 ft 2 in (131.72 m) long, with a beam of 56 feet 2 inches (17.12 m). She had a depth of 34 feet 2 inches (10.41 m) and a draught of 26 feet 9 inches (8.15 m). She was assessed at 7,069 GRT, 5,194 NRT, 9,905 DWT.

The ship was propelled by a triple expansion steam engine, which had cylinders of 23½ inches (60 cm), 37½ inches (95 cm) and 68 inches (170 cm) diameter by 48 inches (120 cm) stroke. The engine was built by Cammell Laird. It drove a single screw propeller. The engine could propel the ship at a speed of 10 knots (19 km/h)

== History ==
The ship was built by Cammell Laird & Co Ltd, Birkenhead, Cheshire in 1941 for the MoWT. She was launched on 12 May 1941 and completed in June 1941. The Code Letters BCLF and United Kingdom Official Number 166321 were allocated. Her port of registry was Liverpool. She was placed under the management of the Booth Steamship Co Ltd, London. As with all CAM ships, she was armed with a Hawker Sea Hurricane aircraft.

Empire Flame made her maiden voyage on 24 June 1941 when she sailed from Liverpool, Lancashire to the Clyde, arriving the next day. She sailed from the Clyde on 7 July to join Convoy OB 343, which had departed from Liverpool the previous day and dispersed at sea (46°N 55°W) on 21 July. Her destination was Halifax, Nova Scotia, Canada, which was reached on 23 July. Carrying a cargo of grain, Empire Flame departed from Halifax on 1 August with Convoy HX 142, which arrived at Liverpool on 18 August. Empire Fame sailed from Liverpool on 1 August with Convoy ON 12, which dispersed at sea (53°34′N 36°14′W) on 14 September. She arrived at Halifax on 21 September. Empire Flame sailed for Sydney, Nova Scotia on 27 September, arriving the next day. Carrying a cargo of grain, She departed on 29 September with Convoy SC 478, which arrived at Liverpool on 20 October. She left the convoy at the Belfast Lough on 18 October and joined Convoy BB 90 which arrived at Milford Haven, Pembrokeshire the next day. She sailed on to Avonmouth, Somerset, arriving on 21 October.

Empire Flame later sailed to Newport, Monmouthshire, from where she departed on 5 November for Milford Haven, arriving two days later. She sailed on 8 November to join Convoy ON 35, which departed from Liverpool on 9 November and dispersed at sea (46°09′N 54°27′W) on 27 November. Empire Flame was bound for Halifax, where she arrived on 27 November. She departed on 2 December, arriving at Sydney the next day. Laden with a cargo of grain, Empire Flame was a member of Convoy SC 58, which departed from Sydney on 4 December and arrived at Liverpool on 21 December.

Empire Flame departed from Liverpool on 13 January 1942 with Convoy ON 57, which dispersed at sea (43°20′N 59°39′W on 7 February. She was carrying the Convoy Commodore, Vice-Admiral Geoffrey Mackworth. She arrived at Halifax later that day, and sailed on 8 February for Portland, Maine, where she arrived on 10 February. Empire Flame sailed on 19 February for Halifax, arriving the next day. During that voyage, she rescued the 56 survivors from Empire Seal, which had been torpedoed and sunk by U-96. Laden with grain, Empire Flame departed on 22 February with Convoy SC 71. The convoy arrived at Liverpool on 19 March. She was sailing without her Hawker Sea Hurricane at this time. Empire Flame sailed from Liverpool on 21 March with Convoy ON 78, which arrived at Halifax on 9 April. Laden with wheat, she returned to the United Kingdom with Convoy SC 80, which sailed on 18 April and arrived at Liverpool on 3 May. Empire Flame was a member of Convoy ON 94, which sailed from Liverpool on 12 May and arrived at Halifax on 25 May. She departed from Halifax on 9 June with Convoy HS 11, which arrived at Sydney two days later. Laden with general cargo, she then joined Convoy SC 87, which sailed on 12 June and arrived at Liverpool on 27 June.

Empire Flame was a member of Convoy ON 110, which departed from Liverpool on 6 July and arrived at Boston, Massachusetts, United States on 26 July. She left the convoy at Halifax on 22 July, joining Convoy XB 31 on 26 July and arriving at Boston two days later. Empire Flame left the convoy at the Cape Cod Canal and sailed to New York, arriving on 30 July. She sailed from New York on 13 August for Boston, where she joined Convoy BX 34, which sailed on 19 August and arrived at Halifax two days later. Carrying steel and general cargo, Empire Flame departed from Halifax on 22 August as a member of Convoy SC 97, which arrived at Liverpool on 7 September. She left the convoy at the Clyde, where she arrived that day. Empire Flame sailed from the Clyde on 20 September to join Convoy ON 132, which had sailed from Liverpool the previous day and arrived at New York on 8 October. She was carrying the Convoy Commodore, Rear-Admiral Sir Errol Manners KBE. She left the convoy at Halifax, arriving on 7 October. Empire Flame sailed from Halifax on 19 October to join Convoy SC 106, which had sailed from New York on 16 October and arrived at Liverpool on 5 November. She was carrying a cargo of grain and also fourteen passengers. Empire Flame was a member of Convoy ON 148, which sailed on 23 November and arrived at New York on 13 December. She was carrying the Convoy Commodore, Captain F H Taylor DSC, Royal Navy. She left the convoy at Halifax, where she arrived on 12 December, sailing the next day with Convoy HF 21, which arrived at Saint John, New Brunswick, Canada, on 15 December. Empire Flame returned to Halifax with Convoy FH 25, which sailed on 28 December, arriving two days later.

Empire Flame sailed on 7 January 1943 to join Convoy SC 118, which had departed from New York on 4 January and arrived at Liverpool on 29 January. She was carrying a cargo of grain. She sailed from Liverpool on 12 February for the Belfast Lough, arriving the next day. She then joined Convoy ON 167, which departed from Liverpool on 14 February and arrived at New York on 8 March. By this time, Empire Flame was no longer a CAM ship. She left the convoy at Halifax, where she arrived on 6 March. She then joined Convoy HF 41, which sailed on 10 March and arrived at St. John two days later. She departed from St. John on 23 March with Convoy FH 44, arriving at Halifax two days later. Empire Flame was a member of Convoy SC 125, which departed from Halifax on 31 March and arrived at Liverpool on 15 April. She was carrying a cargo of flour and the Convoy Commodore, Captain R G Clayton, DSC, Royal Naval Reserve.

Empire Flame was a member of Convoy ONS 6, which departed from Liverpool on 29 April and arrived at Halifax on 17 May. She was carrying the Convoy Commodore, Captain M J D Mayall, Royal Naval Reserve. She then joined Convoy HS 86, which departed on 19 May and arrived at Sydney the next day. Empire Flame then joined Convoy SQ 49, which sailed on 23 May and arrived at Father Point, Quebec, Canada on 27 May. Empire Flame later sailed to the Red Islet, from where she departed on 12 June with Convoy QS 52, arriving at Sydney on 16 June. She then joined Convoy SH 87, which sailed on 18 June and arrived at Halifax the next day. Empire Flame departed from Halifax on 27 June with Convoy SC 135, which arrived at Liverpool on 11 July. She was carrying a cargo of explosives, grain and vehicles. as well as the Convoy Commodore.

Empire Flame sailed from Liverpool on 8 August with Convoy OS 53 km, which split at sea on 17 August to form Convoy OS 53 and Convoy KMS 23G. She was carrying stores bound for Oran, Algeria, She was in the part of the convoy that formed Convoy KMS 23G, which arrived at Gibraltar on 18 August. She then joined Convoy KMS 23, which sailed from Gibraltar that day and arrived at Port Said, Egypt on 30 August. She left the convoy at Algiers, Algeria on 21 August. Empire Flame sailed on 26 September to join Convoy GUS 16, which had sailed from Alexandria, Egypt on 19 September and arrived at the Hampton Roads, Virginia, United States on 15 October. She left the convoy at Oran, Algeria the next day, sailing again on 12 October to join Convoy MKS 27, which had departed from Alexandria on 4 October and arrived at Gibraltar on 14 October. Empire Flame left Gibraltar on 21 October for Melilla, Spain, arriving the next day and then sailing for Gibraltar, where she arrived on 23 October. She then joined Convoy MKS 28G, which sailed that day and rendezvoused at sea on 24 October with Convoy SL 138, the combined convoys arrived at Liverpool on 5 November. Empire Flame was carrying a cargo of iron ore. She left the convoy at Loch Ewe on 5 November and joined Convoy WN 502 which sailed on 7 November and arrived at Methil, Fife the next day. She then joined Convoy FS1268A, which sailed on 9 November and arrived at Southend, Essex the next day. She left the convoy at Middlesbrough, Yorkshire on 10 November.

Empire Flame sailed from Middlesbrough on 3 December to join Convoy FN 1194, which had departed from Southend the previous day and arrived at Methil on 4 December. She then joined Convoy EN 315, which sailed on 5 December and arrived at Loch Ewe the next day. She sailed on to the Clyde, arriving on 8 December.

Empire Flame sailed from Middlesbrough on 3 December to join Convoy FN 1194, which had departed from Southend the previous day and arrived at Methil on 4 December. She then joined Convoy EN 315, which sailed on 5 December and arrived at Loch Ewe on 6 December. She sailed on to the Clyde, arriving on 8 December. Empire Flame sailed on 25 December to join Convoy OS 63 km, which had sailed from Liverpool that day and split at sea on 7 January 1944 to form Convoy OS 63 and Convoy KMS 37. She was carrying stores and vehicles bound for Oran. Empire Flame was in the part of the convoy that formed Convoy KMS 37G and arrived at Gibraltar on 9 January. She then joined Convoy KMS 37, which sailed that day and arrived at Port Said on 20 January. She left the convoy at Algiers on 11 January. Empire Flame sailed on 24 January to join Convoy GUS 28, which had departed from Port Said on 15 January and arrived at the Hampton Roads on 15 February. She left the convoy at Gibraltar on 26 January. She sailed on 6 February to join Convoy OS 66, which had formed at sea the previous day and arrived at Freetown, Sierra Leone on 15 February. Empire Flame was a member of Convoy STL 12, which sailed on 22 February and arrived at Lagos, Nigeria on 29 February. She left the convoy at Takoradi, Gold Coast on 27 February. She sailed on 8 March with Convoy STL 13A, which arrived at Lagos on 9 March. Empire Flame sailed the next day with Convoy LGE 1, which later dispersed at sea. She arrived at Douala, French Cameroons on 13 March. She departed on 27 March and arrived at Lagos on 30 March, sailing that day with Convoy LTS 15, which arrived at Freetown on 6 April. Empire Flame sailed with Convoy SL 155 on 11 April. She was carrying West African produce, as well as three passengers and two bags of mail. The convoy rendezvoused at sea with Convoy MKS 46 on 23 April, The combined convoys arrived at Liverpool on 3 May.

Empire Flame departed from Liverpool on 2 June with Convoy OS 79 km, which split at sea on 11 June to form Convoy OS 79 and Convoy KMS53. She was carrying stores bound for Naples, Italy. She was in the part of the convoy which formed Convoy KMS 53G and arrived at Gibraltar on 13 June. She sailed the next day with Convoy KMS 53, which arrived at Port Said on 24 June. She left the convoy at Augusta, Sicily, Italy on 21 June, sailing that day with Convoy VN 48, which arrived at Naples on 22 June. Empire Flame sailed on 11 July with Convoy NV 51, which arrived at Augusta the next day. She sailed on 13 July to join Convoy MKS 55, which had departed from Port Said on 8 July and arrived at Gibraltar on 20 July. Empire Flame sailed on 23 July to join Convoy OS 83, which had formed at sea that day and arrived at Freetown on 3 August. She sailed for Rio de Janeiro, Brazil, arriving on 14 August. Empire Flame sailed on 26 August for Freetown, where she arrived on 9 September. She sailed on 18 September with Convoy SL 171, which rendezvoused at sea with Convoy MKS 62 on 30 September. The combined convoys arrived at Liverpool on 8 October. She left the convoy and sailed to Falmouth, Cornwall, arriving on 7 October, sailing later that day for Southend, where she arrived on 9 October. Empire Flame sailed the next day with Convoy FN 1506, which arrived at Methil on 12 October. She left the convoy at Immingham, Lincolnshire on 11 October.

Empire Flame sailed on 23 October to join Convoy FN 1519, which had departed from Southend that day and arrived at Methil on 25 October. She then joined Convoy EN 449, which departed on 26 October and arrived at Loch Ewe on 28 October. Empire Flame then sailed to Halifax and joined Convoy XB 134, which sailed on 15 November and arrived at Boston on 17 November. She left the convoy at the Cape Cod Canal that day and sailed to Philadelphia, Pennsylvania, arriving on 18 November. She sailed on 10 December for Boston, from where she sailed on 13 December with Convoy BX 137, arriving at Halifax on 15 December. She sailed with Convoy SC 163 on 17 December, arriving at Liverpool on 31 December. Empire Flame was carrying a cargo of explosives and general cargo.

Empire Flame was a member of Convoy OS 110 km, which sailed on 11 February 1945 and split at sea (44°33′N 11°03′W) on 15 February. She was carrying a cargo of coal, stores and vehicles bound for Naples. She was in the part of the convoy that formed Convoy KMS 84G and arrived at Gibraltar on 19 February, but she sailed on to Naples, arriving on 24 February. Empire Flame sailed on 28 February for Piraeus, Greece, where she arrived on 3 March. She sailed a week later for Augusta, arriving on 12 March and sailing the next day for Bône, Algeria, where she arrived on 15 March. She sailed again on 18 March for Gibraltar, arriving on 21 March and sailing that day with Convoy MKS 90G, which arrived at Liverpool on 28 March. Empire Flame was carrying a cargo of iron ore. She left the convoy and sailed to Southend, arriving on 29 March and then joining Convoy FN1676, which sailed that day and arrived at Methil on 31 March. She left the convoy at Middlesbrough, arriving on 30 March.

Empire Flame sailed on 14 April to join Convoy FN 1688, which had departed from Southend that day and arrived at Methil on 16 April. She then joined Convoy EN 487, which sailed the next day and arrived at Loch Ewe on 19 April. Empire Flame sailed on the Belfast Lough, arriving on 20 April and sailing the next day to join Convoy ONS 48, which had sailed that day from Liverpool and arrived at Halifax on 4 May. She then joined Convoy XB 162, which sailed on 5 Mary and arrived at Boston on 7 May. She left the convoy at the Cape Cod Canal and sailed to New York, arriving on 7 May. Empire Flame sailed on 18 May for Nuevitas, Cuba, from where she sailed on 5 June for the Hampton Roads, where she arrived on 11 June. She sailed the next day for Falmouth, arriving on 26 June and sailing that day for Cardiff, Glamorgan, where she arrived the next day.

Empire Flame sailed on 15 August for Antwerp, Belgium, arriving on 18 August. She departed on 2 September for Cardiff, where she arrived on 4 September. She sailed on 7 September for Cape Henry, Virginia, arriving on 25 September. She sailed from the Hampton Roads the next day for Saint-Nazaire, Loire-Atlantique, France, arriving on 13 October. She then sailed to Brest, Finistère, France, from where she sailed on 13 October for an unrecorded destination.

Before 1945 was out, Empire Flame was sold to the Crawford Shipping Co Ltd, London and renamed Dunkery Beacon. She was sold in 1955 to OY Larus AB, Finland and renamed Rissa. The Code Letters OFVN were allocated. Her port of registry was Helsinki. She was operated under the management of Rolf Simberg, Malmi, Helsinki. The Finnish Official Number 1170 was allocated. She was assessed at 7,095 GRT, 4,513 NRT, 9,905 DWT. Rissa was sold in 1961 to Paulins Rederi A/B, Finland and renamed Augusta Paulin. Her port of registry was changed to Turku. She was operated under the management of Kommanditbolaget Ab Paulin Chartering Oy & Co Kommandiittiyhtiö. In 1962, she was assessed as Ice Class II and the Finnish Official Number 1396 was allocated. In 1964, Augusta Paulin was reassessed at 10,063 DWT. With the introduction of IMO Numbers in the late 1960s, Augusta Paulin was allocated the IMO Number 5030608. In 1967, her port of registry was changed to Nagu. The ship was scrapped in May 1969 in Shanghai.
