= SS Montanan =

Cargo ship built in 1912 for the American-Hawaiian Steamship Company

Coordinates: 46°47′N 13°42′W

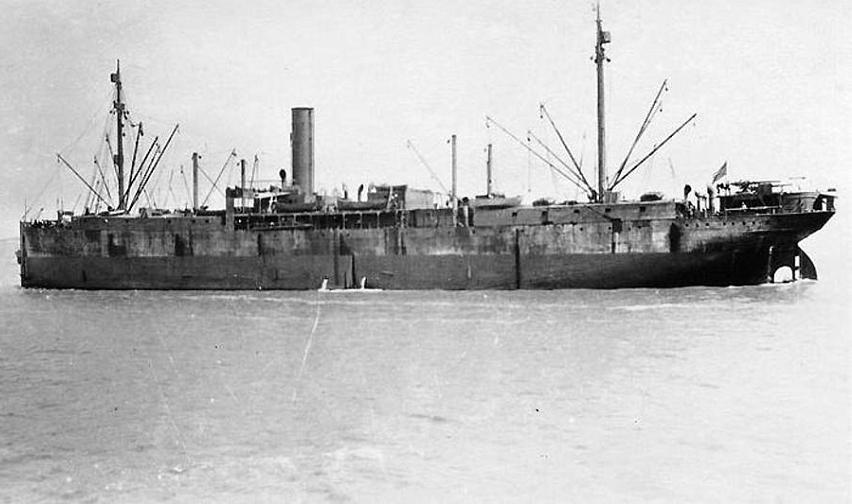
- USAT Montanan at Saint-Nazaire, July 1917

History

United States
- Name: SS Montanan
- Owner: American-Hawaiian Steamship Company
- Port of registry: Boston
- Ordered: September 1911
- Builder: Maryland Steel; Sparrows Point, Maryland
- Cost: $692,000
- Yard number: 126
- Launched: 25 January 1913
- Sponsored by: Miss Lubelle Shepard
- Completed: April 1913
- Identification: U.S. official number: 211088
- Fate: Expropriated by U.S. Army, 1 June 1917

United States
- Name: USAT Montanan
- Acquired: 1 June 1917
- Fate: Sunk, 18 August 1918

General characteristics
- Type: Cargo ship
- Tonnage: 6,649 GRT 9,406 DWT
- Length: 407 ft 7 in (124.23 m) (LPP); 428 ft 9 in (130.68 m) (overall)
- Beam: 53 ft 7 in (16.33 m)
- Draft: 28 ft 0 in (8.53 m)
- Propulsion: oil-fired boilers; 1 × quadruple-expansion steam engine; 1 × screw propeller
- Speed: 14.85 knots (27.50 km/h)
- Capacity: Cargo: 438,154 cubic feet (12,407.1 m^{3})
- Crew: 18 officers, 40 crewmen
- Notes: Sister ships: Minnesotan, Dakotan, Pennsylvanian, Panaman, Washingtonian, Iowan, Ohioan

General characteristics (as USAT Montanan)
- Complement: 86

SS Montanan was a cargo ship built in 1912 for the American-Hawaiian Steamship Company. During World War I service for the United States Army Transport Service, she was known as USAT Montanan. Montanan was built by the Maryland Steel Company as one of eight sister ships for the American-Hawaiian Steamship Company, and was employed in inter-coastal service via the Isthmus of Tehuantepec and the Panama Canal after it opened.

In World War I, USAT Montanan carried cargo and animals to France, and was in the first American convoy to sail to France after the United States entered the war in April 1917. USAT Montanan was torpedoed and sunk by U-90 500 nautical miles (900 km) west of Le Verdon-sur-Mer, France, while it took part in another eastbound convoy in August 1918, Of the 86 men aboard the ship, 81 were rescued by a convoy escort; five men died in the attack.

== Design and construction ==
In September 1911, the American-Hawaiian Steamship Company placed an order with the Maryland Steel Company of Sparrows Point, Maryland, for four new cargo ships—Minnesotan, Dakotan, Montanan, and Pennsylvanian. (Note: Maryland Steel had built three ships—Kentuckian, Georgian, and Honolulan—for American-Hawaiian in 1909 in what proved to be a satisfactory arrangement for both companies. See: Cochran and Ginger, p. 358.) The contract cost of the ships was set at the construction cost plus an 8% profit for Maryland Steel, but with a maximum cost of $640,000 per ship. The construction was financed by Maryland Steel with a credit plan that called for a 5% down payment in cash, with nine monthly installments for the balance. The deal had provisions that allowed some of the nine installments to be converted into longer-term notes or mortgages. The final cost of Montanan, including financing costs, was $73.62 per deadweight ton, which came out to just over $692,000.

Montanan (Maryland Steel yard no. 126) was the second ship built under the original contract. (Note: Further contracts on similar terms were signed in November 1911 and May 1912 to build four additional ships: Panaman, Washingtonian, Iowan, Ohioan. See: Cochran and Ginger, p. 358, and Colton.) She was launched on 25 January 1913, and delivered to American-Hawaiian in April. Montanan was 6,649 gross register tons (GRT), and was 428 ft 9 in (130.68 m) in length and 53 ft 7 in (16.33 m) abeam. She had a deadweight tonnage of 9,406, and her cargo holds, which had a storage capacity of 438,154 cu ft (12,407.1 m^{3}), were outfitted with a complete refrigeration plant so that she could carry perishable products from the West Coast—such as fresh produce from Southern California farms—to the East Coast. Montanan had a single steam engine powered by oil-fired boilers which drove a single screw propeller at a speed of 15 knots (28 km/h; 17 mph).

== Early career ==
When Montanan began sailing for American-Hawaiian, the company shipped cargo from East Coast ports via the Tehuantepec Route to West Coast ports and Hawaii, and vice versa. Shipments on the Tehuantepec Route arrived at Mexican ports—Salina Cruz, Oaxaca, for eastbound cargo, and Coatzacoalcos, Veracruz, for westbound cargo—and traversed the Isthmus of Tehuantepec on the Tehuantepec National Railway. Eastbound shipments were primarily sugar and pineapple from Hawaii, while westbound cargoes were more general in nature. Montanan sailed in this service on the east side of North America.

While headed from New York to Coatzacoalcos in October 1913, Montanan ran aground on Mantanilla Reef, north of The Bahamas. Answering Montanan's distress calls, the Standard Oil Company tanker Rayo assisted in freeing Montanan from the reef. Although she was leaking slightly, Montanan continued on to her destination, and put in for repairs after a return trip to New York.

Following the United States occupation of Veracruz on 21 April 1914 (which took place while six American-Hawaiian ships were being held in various Mexican ports), the Huerta-led Mexican government closed the Tehuantepec National Railway to American shipping. This loss of access, coupled with the fact that the Panama Canal was not yet open, caused American-Hawaii to return to its historic route of sailing around South America via the Straits of Magellan in late April. With the opening of the Panama Canal on 15 August, American-Hawaiian ships switched to the canal route.

On 2 December, The Washington Post reported an incident involving Montanan. While headed down the Pacific coast of Mexico with a cargo of dried fruits and canned goods, Montanan was approached by a Japanese warship, which fired a warning shot for Montanan to stop. After doing so, a boarding party with Japanese officers in a launch headed to Montanan. When the American identity of Montanan was established to the satisfaction of the Japanese, they returned to their ship without boarding Montanan. The news report did not identify the type or the name of the Japanese warship, which had been searching for a German vessel thought to be operating in the area. (Note: Japan had declared war on the German Empire on 23 August 1914.)

On Montanan's next trip, the ship collided with a wharf in Los Angeles Harbor. Montanan had arrived in Los Angeles from Puget Sound on 22 January 1915 to complete her load before sailing for New York and Boston. The almost fully loaded ship was slow to respond to the helm and ended up "ploughing through" 50 ft (15 m) of Municipal Pier A on Mormon Island channel before coming to a stop at a stone bulkhead. One hull plate on Montanan was dented, but the ship was otherwise undamaged. Montanan's captain, who had a local license, did not take on a harbor pilot and American-Hawaiian was liable for the damage, estimated by the harbor engineer to be $2,500.

Contemporary news reports offer hints at cargoes that Montanan carried during this period. In April 1915, the Los Angeles Times reported on the sailing of Montanan with a full cargo. The majority of the cargo was rice—from Japan, China, and California—which was destined for the United Kingdom to feed Indian troops fighting in Europe. In June, The Wall Street Journal reported that Montanan and Santa Clara (of the Grace Line) had sailed from Tacoma, Washington, with 2,500 tons of copper between them.

In October 1915, landslides closed the Panama Canal and all American-Hawaiian ships, including Montanan, returned to the Straits of Magellan route again. Montanan's exact movements from this time through early 1917 are unclear. She may have been in the half of the American-Hawaiian fleet that was chartered for transatlantic service, or she may have been in the group of American-Hawaiian ships chartered for service to South America, delivering coal, gasoline, and steel in exchange for coffee, nitrates, cocoa, rubber, and manganese ore.

== U.S. Army service ==
After the United States declared war on the German Empire in April 1917, the United States Army—needing transports to get its men and materiel to France—had a select committee of shipping executives pore over registries of American shipping. The committee selected Montanan, her sister ship Dakotan, and 12 other American-flagged ships that were sufficiently fast, could carry enough fuel in their bunkers for transatlantic crossings, and, most importantly, were in port or not far at sea. After Montanan discharged her last load of cargo, she was officially handed over to the Army on 29 May.

Before troop transportation began, all of the ships were hastily refitted. Of the fourteen ships, four, including Montanan and Dakotan, were designated to carry animals and other cargo; the other ten were designated to carry troops. Ramps and stalls were built on the four ships chosen to carry livestock. Gun platforms were installed on each ship before docking at the Brooklyn Navy Yard, where the guns were put in place. (Note: The only exception was for SS Finland, an American Line steamer in transatlantic service to Liverpool. Finland had already been outfitted for guns in early 1917.) All the ships were crewed by merchant officers and sailors but carried two United States Navy officers, Navy gun crews, quartermasters, signalmen, and wireless operators. The senior Navy officer on board would take control if a ship came under attack.

The American convoy carrying the first units of the American Expeditionary Force was separated into four groups; (Note: The individual groups of the first convoy were typically counted as separate convoys in post-war sources. See, for example, Crowell and Wilson, Appendix G, p. 603.) Montanan was in the fourth group with her sister ship Dakotan, Army transports El Occidente and Edward Luckenbach, and escorts consisting of cruiser St. Louis, U.S. Navy transport Hancock, and destroyers Shaw, Ammen, and Flusser. Montanan departed with her group on the morning of 17 June for Brest, France, steaming at an 11-knot (20 km/h; 13 mph) pace. A thwarted submarine attack on the first convoy group, and reports of heavy submarine activity off of Brest, resulted in a change in the convoy's destination to Saint-Nazaire where the convoy arrived 2 July.

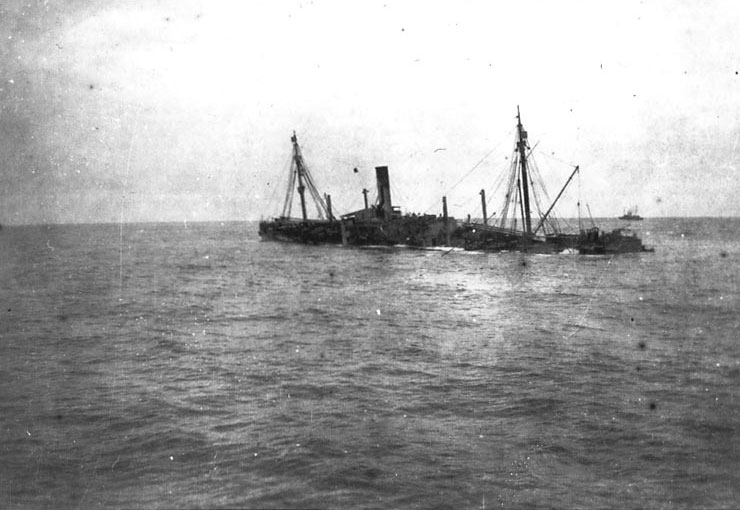
Montanan after being torpedoed on 15 August 1918

Montanan departed Saint-Nazaire on 14 July in the company of her convoy mates El Occidente, Dakotan, and Edward Luckenbach. Joining the return trip were Army transport Momus, Navy armed collier Cyclops, Navy oiler Kanawha, and cruiser Seattle, the flagship of Rear Admiral Albert Gleaves, the head of the Navy's Cruiser and Transport Force.

Sources do not reveal Montanan's movements over the next months, but on 1 August 1918, Montanan sailed in Convoy HB 8 with U.S. Navy cargo ships West Alsek, West Bridge, and 13 others for France. Escorted by the armed yacht Noma, destroyers Burrows and Smith, and French cruiser Marseillaise, the convoy was 500 nmi (900 km; 600 mi) west of its destination of Le Verdon-sur-Mer by the end of the day on 15 August. At sundown, shortly before 18:00, the German submarine U-90 launched three torpedoes at Montanan. (Note: U-90 had sunk the United States Navy transport USS President Lincoln in late May.) The first two, spotted by lookouts aboard Montanan, missed, but a third, unseen torpedo struck Montanan amidships on her port side, opening a large hole. Montanan began to settle and was abandoned quickly. Two of Montanan's Naval Armed Guardsmen drowned when their lifeboat capsized in the heavy seas; three of her civilian crewmen also died in the attack. Montanan's 81 survivors were rescued by convoy escort Noma.

Shortly after Montanan was attacked, West Bridge, which had previously developed engine trouble and was drifting, was torpedoed by U-107 and abandoned. By the morning of 16 August both Montanan and West Bridge, with decks awash, were still afloat some 4 nmi (7.4 km; 4.6 mi) apart. Montanan's captain and several officers reboarded the ship the next morning for an attempt to get her under tow, but despite their efforts, the ship sank later that morning. (Note: In contrast, a work party from the destroyer Smith was able to stabilize West Bridge, and four tugboats dispatched from Brest towed that ship safely into port. See: Naval Historical Center. "West Bridge". DANFS.)

== Bibliography ==
- Bureau of Ordnance (1920). Navy Ordnance Activities: World War, 1917–1918. Washington, D.C.: United States Government Printing Office. OCLC 686627.
- Cochran, Thomas C.; Ray Ginger (December 1954). "The American-Hawaiian Steamship Company, 1899–1919". The Business History Review. 28 (4). Boston: The President and Fellows of Harvard College: 343–365. doi:10.2307/3111801. JSTOR 3111801. OCLC 216113867. S2CID 154716297.
- Colton, Tim. "Bethlehem Steel Company, Sparrows Point MD". shipbuildinghistory.com. The Colton Company. Archived from the original on 8 October 2008.
- Crowell, Benedict; Robert Forrest Wilson (1921). The Road to France: The Transportation of Troops and Military Supplies, 1917–1918. How America Went to War: An Account From Official Sources of the Nation's War Activities, 1917–1920. New Haven: Yale University Press. ISBN 1-143-73956-6. OCLC 18696066.
- Gleaves, Albert (1921). A History of the Transport Service: Adventures and Experiences of United States Transports and Cruisers in the World War. New York: George H. Doran Company. OCLC 976757.
- Hovey, Edmund Otis (1907). "The Isthmus of Tehuantepec and the Tehuantepec National Railway". Bulletin of the American Geographical Society. 39 (2). New York: American Geographical Society: 78–91. doi:10.2307/198380. JSTOR 198380. OCLC 2097765.
- Mann, Raymond A. (21 November 2005). "Burrows". Dictionary of American Naval Fighting Ships. Navy Department, Naval History and Heritage Command.
- Naval Historical Center. "Montanan". Dictionary of American Naval Fighting Ships. Navy Department, Naval History & Heritage Command.
- Naval Historical Center. "West Alsek". Dictionary of American Naval Fighting Ships. Navy Department, Naval History & Heritage Command.
- Naval Historical Center. "West Bridge". Dictionary of American Naval Fighting Ships. Navy Department, Naval History & Heritage Command.
- Sharpe, Henry Granville (1921). The Quartermaster Corps in the Year 1917 in the World War. New York: Century Co. OCLC 7980339.
- Warwick, Walter W.; Charles M. Foree (1916). Decisions of the Comptroller of the Treasury, Volume 22: July 1, 1915, to June 30, 1916. Washington, D.C.: Government Printing Office. OCLC 1768278.
