= USS Alaskan =

Cargo ship of the United States Navy

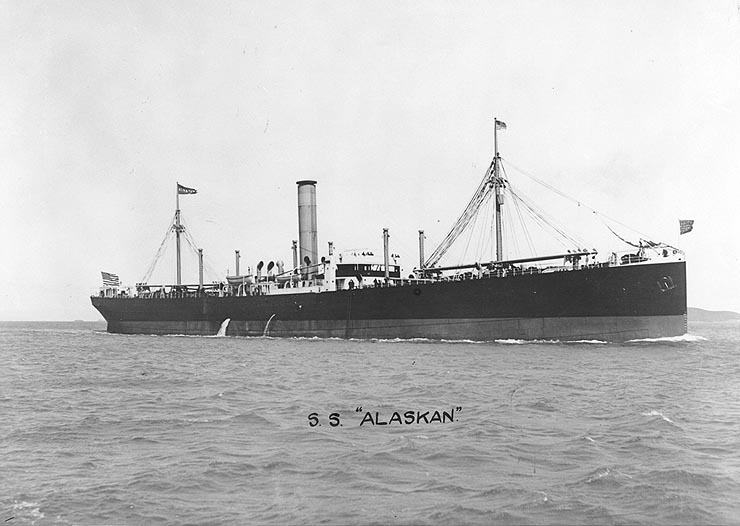
- SS Alaskan, probably at the time of her completion in 1902.

History

United States
- Name: USS Alaskan
- Namesake: State of Alaska
- Owner: American-Hawaiian Steamship Company
- Operator: American-Hawaiian Steamship Company
- Builder: Union Iron Works, San Francisco, California
- Launched: 14 May 1901
- Completed: 1902
- Acquired: 12 March 1918
- Commissioned: 23 March 1918
- Decommissioned: 5 August 1919
- Renamed: SS Memore
- Fate: Returned to owners 5 August 1919
- Notes: In commercial service as SS Alaskan 1902–1918 and 1919–1927 and as SS Memore 1927–1933; Probably scrapped ca. 1933

General characteristics
- Type: Cargo ship and troop transport
- Tonnage: 8,672 Gross register tons
- Displacement: 19,419 long tons (19,731 t)
- Length: 490 ft 0 in (149.35 m)
- Beam: 57 ft 2 in (17.42 m)
- Draft: 31 ft 10 in (9.70 m) (aft)
- Installed power: 6,000 ihp (4,500 kW)
- Propulsion: Two 3000-ihp (2.24 MW) steam engines, two shafts
- Speed: 10.15 knots (18.80 km/h; 11.68 mph) (maximum)
- Complement: 94
- Armament: 1 × 6-inch (152-millimeter) gun; 1 × 6-pounder gun; (guns removed December 1918)

USS Alaskan (ID-4542) was a United States Navy cargo ship and troop transport in commission from 1918 to 1919.

== Construction and commercial service, 1902–1918 ==
Alaskan was built in 1902 at San Francisco, California, by the Union Iron Works as the commercial cargo ship SS Alaskan for the American-Hawaiian Steamship Company, which employed her on the New York City-to-San Francisco-to-Honolulu, Hawaii, trade. Alaskan and her sister ship SS Arizonan — which later served in the U.S. Navy as USS Arizonan (ID-4542A) — represented, according to a contemporary account, the "most advanced practice in the construction of ocean-going freighters and ... a most important addition to the American merchant marine." Intended exclusively for carrying freight, Alaskan was designed as a very strong ship with a large stowage capacity.

== United States Navy service, 1918–1919 ==
=== World War I service ===
The U.S. Navy inspected Alaskan in the 3rd Naval District on 23 May 1917, found her desirable for World War I Navy service, and assigned her the Naval Registry Identification Number (Id. No.) 4542, but did not take control of her for several more months. On 12 March 1918, the United States Shipping Board turned the ship over to the United States Department of War as a cargo ship to be manned and operated by the Naval Overseas Transportation Service (NOTS) for the United States Army on a bareboat charter basis. The Navy took control of her that same day and commissioned her on 23 March 1918 at Morse Dry Dock, Brooklyn, New York, as USS Alaskan.

Alaskan departed Brooklyn for Hampton Roads, Virginia, on the afternoon of 24 March 1918. Anchoring in Hampton Roads in the predawn darkness of 26 March 1918, she moved shortly thereafter to the Norfolk and Western Piers, docking there at 12:28 hours. Over the ensuing days, she received more men and underwent repairs. Yard work completed and her complement brought up to full allowance, Alaskan shifted to Pier 5, U. S. Army Piers, Newport News, Virginia, on 13 April 1918 to take on cargo. On 16 April 1918, she proceeded to sea and joined a France-bound convoy on 17 April 1918. She reached Brest, France, on the afternoon of 2 May 1918, then weighed anchor early on the morning of 3 May 1918 to proceed in a coastal convoy to St. Nazaire, France.

On 3 May 1918, during the voyage, one of the ships in the convoy, the American merchant ship SS Pearl F., attempted to cut between columns, veering across Alaskan's bow. The accident resulted in Alaskan's stem being badly twisted to starboard, and plates attached to her stem either broke off or cracked, but she was still able to complete the voyage, anchoring at St. Nazaire that evening. However, due to crowded harbor conditions, she did not begin discharging cargo until 6 May 1918.

On 13 May 1918, lookouts aboard Alaskan spotted a fire breaking out on board U.S. Navy animal transport USS Mexican (ID-1655), lying directly ahead of Alaskan in St. Nazaire harbor. Alaskan called away her fire and rescue party, which aided Mexican's men in controlling the blaze before it did serious damage.

Alaskan remained in French waters into June 1918, first at St. Nazaire, completing the discharge of her cargo, before proceeding down the coast, passing the Île d'Yeu on 7 June 1918 in a coastal convoy bound for the Gironde River, which she reached later that day. Getting underway on 10 June 1918 for the return voyage to the United States, the ship brought her first voyage for NOTS to a close when she reached New York Harbor late on 23 June 1918.

Alsakan underwent voyage repairs at Morse Drydock, Brooklyn, before moving to Bush Terminal Pier No. 6 to take on cargo, then began her second wartime voyage in naval service on 28 July 1918, again crossing the Atlantic Ocean in a convoy. Carrying the vice commodore of the convoy, Lieutenant Commander Isaiah F. Shurtleff, USNRF, Alaskan arrived at St. Nazaire on 12 August 1918, anchoring late on 13 August 1918. Among the cargo she discharged was oil for the tanks at the United States Naval Aviation Station, Le Croisic, France. With a return cargo that included ordnance material, Alaskan got underway for the United States on the afternoon of 28 August 1918 and reached Hampton Roads on the afternoon of 13 September 1918.

For her third U.S. Navy voyage during the war, Alaskan cleared Hampton Roads on 29 September 1918 and joined a France-bound convoy on 30 September 1918, this time routed via Gibraltar. Arriving at Gibraltar on 16 October 1918, Alaskan lingered there until 20 October 1918, when she began the last passage of her voyage. Two days out, at 11:37 hours on 22 October 1918, she collided with and sank a fishing boat. Fortunately, another boat "of similar character" fished the sunken boat's men out of the sea.

Reaching Marseille, France, a little before midnight on 23 October 1918, Alaskan discharged lumber, tractors, and trailers, on 26 October 1918 and over ensuing days. She was still lying in port on 11 November 1918 when the news reached her of the signing of the armistice with Germany, an event duly celebrated by the ship's sounding her whistle and hoisting Allied flags. Alaskan ultimately reached Newport News, via Gibraltar, on the afternoon of 29 November 1918, bringing to a close her third and final round-trip voyage under the aegis of NOTS.

=== Postwar service ===
With World War I over, the return of American troops to the United States from Europe became a priority. Alaskan was selected for conversion to a troop transport. On 10 December 1918, she departed Newport News for New York City. She was assigned to the Cruiser and Transport Force on 12 December 1918. On 19 December 1918, her guns were removed by a U.S. Navy derrick lighter off Weehawken, New Jersey. Over the following weeks, she underwent a metamorphosis from cargo ship to troopship at Brooklyn by the W. A. Fletcher Shipyard under the direction of U.S. Army authorities, with the addition of troop accommodations for up to 2,260 men.

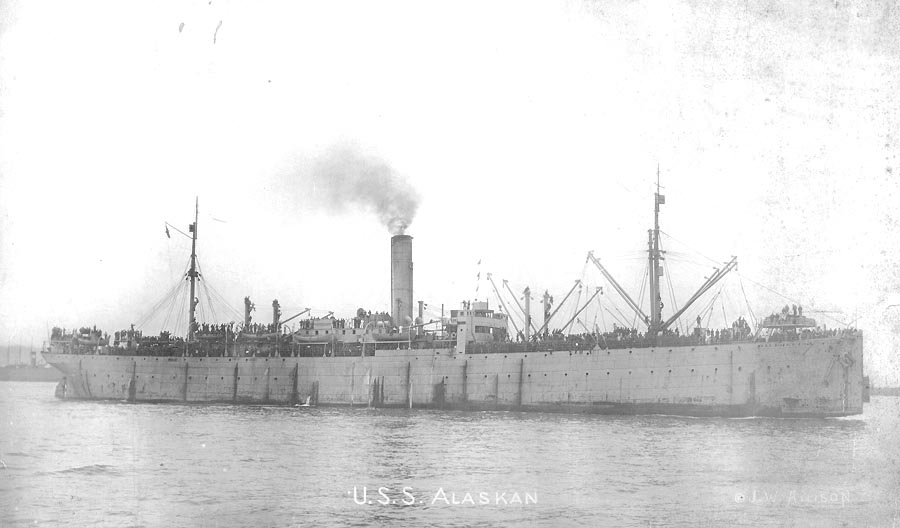
Alaskan arrives in the United States, probably at New York City, in 1919 with her decks filled with American troops returning from World War I service in Europe.

Now a troop transport, Alaskan cleared New York Harbor on 24 February 1919 bound for France, and reached St. Nazaire on 10 March 1919. After embarking troops between 09:10 and 17:10 hours on 15 March 1919, she got underway later that day on the return leg of the voyage. She moored at Army Pier No. 2, Hoboken, New Jersey, on 31 March 1919, and, after quick voyage repairs, departed again for European waters on 7 April 1919. She conducted three more trooping voyages, one to Bordeaux, France, and two to St. Nazaire, each time returning to disembark returning "doughboys" at Hoboken. She sent her last contingents of troops ashore alongside Pier No. 8, Hoboken, on the afternoon of 16 July 1919.

After drydocking at Brooklyn and the removal of her troop accommodations, Alaskan was back at Pier No. 8, Hoboken, by 24 July 1919. On 5 August 1919, at 16:02 hours, Alaskan was turned over to her prewar owners, the American-Hawaiian Steamship Company.

== Commercial service, 1919–1933 ==
Once again SS Alaskan, the ship operated under the house flag of the American-Hawaiian Steamship Company until sold to Italian interests in 1927. Under Italian ownership, she was renamed SS Memore and was registered by the Companie Generale Armamento Soc. Anon., her home port being listed as Genoa, Italy. She remained on contemporary merchant vessel lists until 1933, and then her name disappeared from the rolls. Presumably, she was scrapped in Italy during or soon after 1933.
