= SS Dakotan =

Cargo ship built in 1912

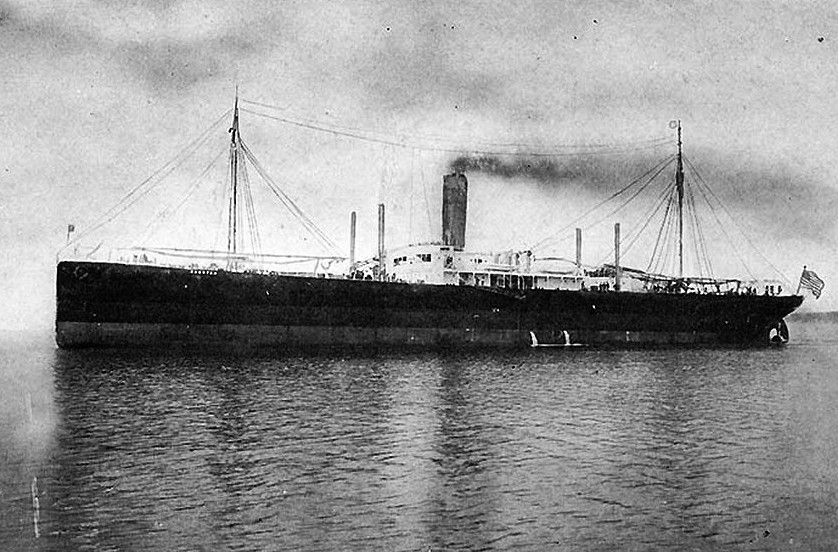
- SS Dakotan prior to World War I

History
- Name: SS Dakotan
- Owner: American-Hawaiian Steamship Company
- Port of registry: New York
- Ordered: September 1911
- Builder: Maryland Steel; Sparrows Point, Maryland
- Cost: $672,000
- Yard number: 125
- Launched: 10 August 1912
- Completed: November 1912
- Identification: U.S. official number: 210753
- Fate: expropriated by U.S. Army, 29 May 1917

United States
- Name: USAT Dakotan
- Acquired: 29 May 1917
- Fate: transferred to U.S. Navy, 29 January 1919

United States
- Name: USS Dakotan
- Acquired: 29 January 1919
- Commissioned: 29 January 1919
- Decommissioned: 31 July 1919
- Identification: ID-3882
- Fate: returned to owners, 31 July 1919
- Name: SS Dakotan
- Owner: American-Hawaiian Steamship Company
- Acquired: 31 July 1919
- Fate: requisitioned by War Shipping Administration; transferred to Soviet Union under Lend-Lease

Soviet Union
- Name: SS Zyrianin (Зырянин in Cyrillic)
- Namesake: Komi peoples
- Operator: 1943–1957: Far East Shipping Company; 1957–1969: Black Sea Shipping Company
- Acquired: December 1942
- Identification: IMO number: 5399664
- Fate: Scrapped 1969

General characteristics
- Type: Cargo ship
- Tonnage: 6,537 GRT 10,175 LT DWT
- Length: 407 ft 10 in (124.31 m) (LPP); 428 ft 9 in (130.68 m) (overall)
- Beam: 53 ft 6 in (16.31 m)
- Draft: 23 ft (7.0 m)
- Depth of hold: 29 ft 6 in (8.99 m)
- Propulsion: oil-fired boilers; 1 × quadruple-expansion steam engine; 1 × screw propeller
- Speed: 15 knots (28 km/h)
- Capacity: Cargo: 492,549 cubic feet (13,947.4 m^{3}); Passengers: 16
- Crew: 18 officers, 40 crewmen
- Notes: Sister ships: Minnesotan, Montanan, Pennsylvanian, Panaman, Washingtonian, Iowan, Ohioan

General characteristics (as USS Dakotan)
- Displacement: 14,375 t
- Troops: 1,685
- Complement: 88
- Armament: 2 × 5-inch (130 mm) guns (World War I)

SS Dakotan was a cargo ship built in 1912 for the American-Hawaiian Steamship Company that served as a transport ship in the United States Army Transport Service in World War I, and then was transferred to the Soviet Union under Lend-Lease in World War II before being finally scrapped in 1969. During World War I, she was taken over by the United States Army as USAT Dakotan. Near the end of that war she was transferred to the United States Navy and commissioned as USS Dakotan (ID-3882). During World War II, the ship was transferred to the Soviet Union and renamed SS Zyrianin (or Зырянин in Cyrillic).

Dakotan was built by the Maryland Steel Company as one of eight sister ships for the American-Hawaiian Steamship Company, and was employed in inter-coastal service via the Isthmus of Tehuantepec and the Panama Canal after it opened. During World War I, as USAT Dakotan, the ship carried cargo and animals to France. Dakotan was in the first American convoy to sail to France after the United States entered the war in April 1917. In Navy service, USS Dakotan carried cargo to France and returned over 8,800 American troops after the Armistice.

After her Navy service ended in 1919, she was returned to her original owners and resumed relatively uneventful cargo service over the next twenty years. Dakotan ran aground off the coast of Mexico in 1923 but was freed and towed to port for repairs. Early in World War II, the ship was requisitioned by the War Shipping Administration and transferred to the Soviet Union under the terms of Lend-Lease in December 1942. Sailing as SS Zyrianin, the ship remained a part of the Soviet merchant fleet into the late 1960s.

== Design and construction ==
In September 1911, the American-Hawaiian Steamship Company placed an order with the Maryland Steel Company of Sparrows Point, Maryland, for four new cargo ships—Minnesotan, Dakotan, Pennsylvanian, and Montanan. (Note: Maryland Steel had built three ships—Kentuckian, Georgian, and Honolulan—for American-Hawaiian in 1909 in what proved to be a satisfactory arrangement for both companies. See: Cochran and Ginger, p. 358.) The contract cost of the ships was set at the construction cost plus an 8% profit for Maryland Steel, but with a maximum cost of $640,000 per ship. The construction was financed by Maryland Steel with a credit plan that called for a 5% down payment in cash with nine monthly installments for the balance. The deal had provisions that allowed some of the nine installments to be converted into longer-term notes or mortgages. The final cost of Dakotan, including financing costs, was $66.00 per deadweight ton, which totaled just under $672,000.

Dakotan (Maryland Steel yard no. 125) was the second ship built under the original contract. (Note: Further contracts on similar terms were signed in November 1911 and May 1912 to build four additional ships: Panaman, Washingtonian, Iowan, Ohioan. See: Cochran and Ginger, p. 358, and Colton.) She was launched on 10 August 1912, and delivered to American-Hawaiian in November. Dakotan was 6,537 gross register tons (GRT), and was 428 feet 9 inches (130.68 m) in length and 53 feet 6 inches (16.31 m) abeam. She had a deadweight tonnage of 10,175 LT DWT and a storage capacity of 492,519 cubic feet (13,946.6 m^{3}). A single steam engine with oil-fired boilers driving a single screw propeller provided her power; her speed was 15 knots (28 km/h). The steamer had accommodations for 18 officers, 40 crewmen, and could carry up to 16 passengers.

== Early career ==
When Dakotan began sailing for American-Hawaiian, the company shipped cargo from East Coast ports via the Tehuantepec Route to West Coast ports and Hawaii, and vice versa. Shipments on the Tehuantepec Route arrived at Mexican ports—Salina Cruz, Oaxaca, for eastbound cargo, and Coatzacoalcos for westbound cargo—and traversed the Isthmus of Tehuantepec on the Tehuantepec National Railway. Eastbound shipments were primarily sugar and pineapple from Hawaii, while westbound cargoes were general in nature. Dakotan sailed in this service on the east side of North America.

At the time of the United States occupation of Veracruz on 21 April 1914, Dakotan was in port at Coatzacoalcos. There she loaded 127 American refugees from sugar plantations in the area and steamed to Veracruz. As a consequence of the American action, the Huerta-led Mexican government closed the Tehuantepec National Railway to American shipping.

In early May, The New York Times reported that Dakotan had sailed to Cristóbal to pick up a cargo of sugar that had been originally slated for transport via Tehuantepec. According to the article, the sugar was to be carried on barges through the still-unopened Panama Canal, then loaded onto Dakotan. There was no indication in the newspaper whether this mission was completed or not, but it is known that American-Hawaii returned to its historic route of sailing cargo around South America via the Straits of Magellan after Tehuantepec was closed but before the canal opened.

With the opening of the Panama Canal on 15 August, American-Hawaiian ships switched to using the canal. In early September, American-Hawaiian announced that Dakotan would sail on a route from New York via the canal to San Francisco and on to either Seattle or Tacoma. When landslides closed the canal in October 1915, all American-Hawaiian ships, including Dakotan, returned to the Straits of Magellan route.

In 1916, Dakotan was one of several American-Hawaiian cargo ships chartered by the DuPont Nitrate Company to carry sodium nitrate from Chile to the United States. Dakotan and the other cargo ships in this South American service would typically deliver loads of coal, gasoline, or steel in exchange for the sodium nitrate. In May, The Christian Science Monitor reported on what may have been a typical delivery for Dakotan. The ship had left Tocopilla with 91,872 bags—about 9,000 long tons (9,100 t)—of sodium nitrate for use in making explosives, and, after transiting the newly reopened Panama Canal, arrived in Philadelphia. (Note: Dakotan was the first steamer to arrive in Philadelphia via the Panama Canal after its reopening.)

== World War I ==
After the United States declared war on Germany in April 1917, the United States Army, needing transports to move its men and materiel to France, convened a select committee of shipping executives who pored over registries of American shipping to evaluate transport capabilities. The committee selected Dakotan, her sister ship Montanan, and twelve other American-flagged ships that were sufficiently fast, could carry enough fuel in their bunkers for transatlantic crossings, and, most importantly, were in port or not far at sea. After Dakotan discharged her last load of cargo, she was officially handed over to the Army on 29 May.

Before troop transportation began, all of the ships were hastily refitted. Of the fourteen ships, four, including Dakotan and Montanan, were designated to carry animals and cargo; the other ten were designated to carry human passengers. Ramps and stalls were built on the four ships chosen to carry animals. Gun platforms were installed on each ship before it docked at the Brooklyn Navy Yard, where the guns were put in place. (Note: The only exception was for SS Finland, an American Line steamer in transatlantic service to Liverpool. Finland had already been outfitted for guns in early 1917.) All the ships were crewed by merchant officers and sailors but carried military personnel: two U.S. Navy officers, Navy gun crews, quartermasters, signalmen, and wireless operators. The senior Navy officer on board would take control if a ship came under attack.

The American convoy carrying the first units of the American Expeditionary Force was separated into four groups; (Note: The individual groups of the first convoy were typically counted as separate convoys in post-war sources. See, for example, Crowell and Wilson, Appendix G, p. 603.) Dakotan was in the fourth group with her sister ship Montanan, Army transports El Occidente and Edward Luckenbach, and accompanied by the group's escorts: cruiser St. Louis, U.S. Navy transport Hancock, and destroyers Shaw, Ammen, and Flusser. Dakotan departed with her group on the morning of 17 June for Brest, France, steaming at an 11-knot (20 km/h) pace. A thwarted submarine attack on the first convoy group, and reports of heavy submarine activity off of Brest resulted in a change in the convoy's destination to Saint-Nazaire.

Dakotan departed Saint-Nazaire on 14 July in the company of her convoy mates El Occidente, Montanan, and Edward Luckenbach. Joining the return trip were Army transport Momus, Navy armed collier Cyclops, Navy oiler Kanawha, and cruiser Seattle, the flagship of Rear Admiral Albert Gleaves, the head of the Navy's Cruiser and Transport Force.

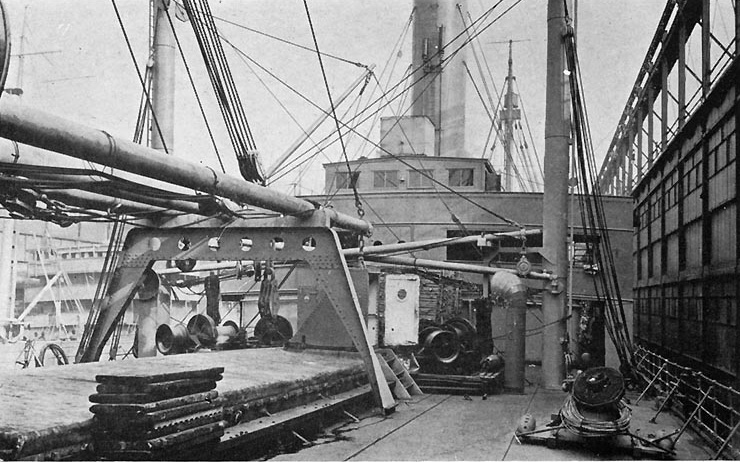
The bridge and foredeck of USS Dakotan, c. 1919

Sources do not reveal Dakotan's movements over the next months, but on 6 September 1917, the Naval Armed Guardsmen aboard Dakotan shelled a German submarine after its periscope had been sighted. On 29 January 1919, Dakotan was transferred to the Navy and commissioned the same day. Outfitted for service as a troop transport to return American servicemen from Europe, Dakotan made five transatlantic roundtrips to France as part of the Navy's Cruiser and Transport Force between 15 February and 20 July. Eastbound journeys delivered cargo to Saint-Nazaire and Bordeaux for the Army of Occupation; westbound trips returned soldiers to the United States. Dakotan carried a total of 8,812 troops on her five westbound voyages. Dakotan returned from her final voyage on 20 July, was decommissioned at New York on 31 July, and returned to American-Hawaiian the same day.

== Interwar years ==
Dakotan resumed cargo service with American-Hawaiian after her return from World War I service. Although the company had abandoned its original Hawaiian sugar routes, Dakotan continued inter-coastal service through the Panama Canal in a relatively uneventful manner over the next twenty years. One incident of note occurred on 20 August 1923 when Dakotan issued distress calls after she ran aground at Cabo San Lázaro on the Pacific coast of Mexico. The Navy transport ship Henderson and the Standard Oil tanker Charles Pratt responded to Dakotan's calls. Charles Pratt successfully freed Dakotan, which had suffered damage to her rudder post in the accident. The American-Hawaiian ship Nevadan arrived and towed Dakotan to Los Angeles for repairs.

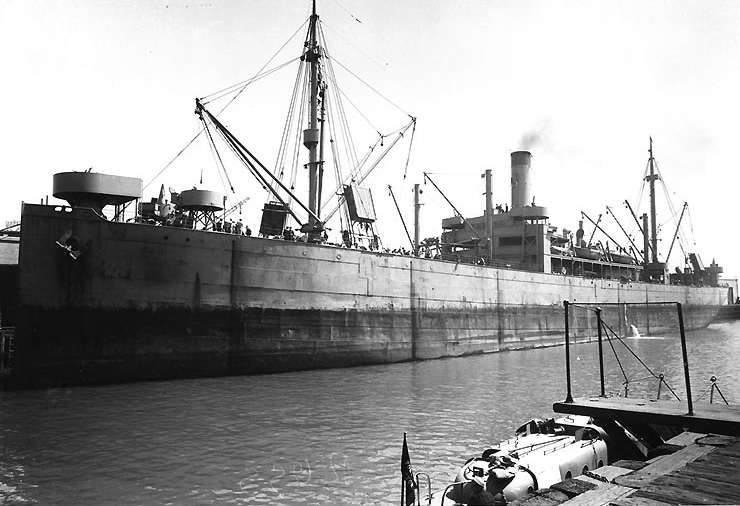
SS Zyrianin in port at San Francisco, c. 1943

In 1933, two members of Dakotan's crew had medical emergencies that received news coverage. The first, in February, involved a seaman with an abdominal disorder. He was transferred from the eastbound Dakotan to the Dollar Line ocean liner President Hayes which carried him to Los Angeles to receive medical attention. The second occurred in July when Dakotan's quartermaster came down with appendicitis near Balboa. Radio calls for assistance brought the U.S. Navy's Destroyer Division 7 to Dakotan's aid. (Note: Destroyer Division 7 consisted of Childs, Barry, and Williamson) The destroyer unit's medical officer boarded Dakotan and performed an appendectomy on the man, who was too ill to be moved off the ship.

== World War II and later career ==
After the United States entered World War II, in 1941 - though most of Europe had been involved since summer 1939 - Dakotan was requisitioned by the War Shipping Administration (WSA), but continued to be operated by American-Hawaiian. In December 1942, Dakotan was transferred to the Soviet Union under Lend-Lease, and renamed Zyrianin (Зырянин Russian pronunciation: [zɨˈrʲanʲɪn]). Throughout the rest of the war, Dakotan made at least one trip to the United States, being photographed in port at San Francisco in August 1943. Near the end of World War II, the WSA offered a payment of $670,210 to American-Hawaiian for the former Dakotan as part of a $7.2 million settlement for eleven American-Hawaiian ships that had been requisitioned by the WSA. Zyrianin remained a part of the Soviet merchant fleet through the 1960s, and was listed in Lloyd's Register until the 1970–71 edition.

Zyrianin was operated by the Far East Shipping Company (FESCO) from 1943 to 1957. From 1957, she was operated by the Black Sea Shipping Company. The ship was written off and scrapped at Split, Yugoslavia in 1969.

== Bibliography ==
- Bureau of Ordnance (1920). Navy Ordnance Activities: World War, 1917–1918. Washington, D.C.: United States Government Printing Office. OCLC 686627.
- Cochran, Thomas C.; Ray Ginger (December 1954). "The American-Hawaiian Steamship Company, 1899–1919". The Business History Review. 28 (4). Boston: The President and Fellows of Harvard College: 343–365. doi:10.2307/3111801. JSTOR 3111801. OCLC 216113867. S2CID 154716297.
- Crowell, Benedict; Robert Forrest Wilson (1921). The Road to France: The Transportation of Troops and Military Supplies, 1917–1918. How America Went to War: An Account From Official Sources of the Nation's War Activities, 1917–1920. New Haven: Yale University Press. OCLC 18696066.
- Gleaves, Albert (1921). A History of the Transport Service: Adventures and Experiences of United States Transports and Cruisers in the World War. New York: George H. Doran Company. OCLC 976757.
- Hovey, Edmund Otis (1907). "The Isthmus of Tehuantepec and the Tehuantepec National Railway". Bulletin of the American Geographical Society. 39 (2). New York: American Geographical Society: 78–91. doi:10.2307/198380. JSTOR 198380. OCLC 2097765.
- Naval Historical Center. "Dakotan". Dictionary of American Naval Fighting Ships. Navy Department, Naval History and Heritage Command.
- Sharpe, Henry Granville (1921). The Quartermaster Corps in the Year 1917 in the World War. New York: Century Co. OCLC 7980339.
