= SS President Hayes =

SS President Hayes may refer to:

- SS President Hayes (1920), Design 1095 steam passenger-cargo ship launched as Creole State by New York Shipbuilding in Camden, New Jersey.
- SS President Hayes (1941), a passenger-cargo variant of the C3 type, built by Newport News Shipbuilding in Newport News, Virginia and became USS President Hayes (AP-39) the same year, later APA-20.
