= USS Arizonan =

Cargo ship of the United States Navy

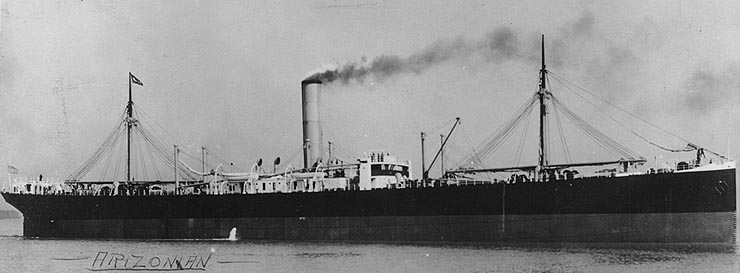
- SS Arizonan soon after her completion in 1903.

History

United States
- Name: USS Arizonan
- Namesake: Previous name retained
- Builder: Union Iron Works, San Francisco, California
- Launched: 20 September 1902
- Completed: Early 1903
- Acquired: 10 August 1918
- Commissioned: 14 August 1918
- Decommissioned: 29 September 1919
- Stricken: 29 September 1919
- Fate: Returned to owners 1919
- Notes: In commercial service as SS Arizonan 1903–1918 and 1919–1927 or 1928, then under Japanese registry; Probably scrapped around end of 1920s

General characteristics
- Type: Cargo ship and troop transport
- Tonnage: 8,672 Gross register tons
- Displacement: 19,419 tons
- Length: 490 ft 0 in (149.35 m)
- Beam: 57 ft 2 in (17.42 m)
- Draft: 31 ft 6 in (9.60 m) (mean)
- Installed power: 6,000 indicated horsepower (ihp) (4.48 megawatts (MW))
- Propulsion: Two 3000-ihp (2.24 MW) steam engines, two shafts
- Speed: 10.15 knots (maximum)
- Complement: 70 or 97
- Armament: 1 × 5-inch (127-millimeter) gun; 1 × 3-inch (76.2-millimeter) gun; (guns removed ca. December 1918 – January 1919)

USS Arizonan (ID-4542A), also written ID-4542-A was a United States Navy cargo ship and troop transport in commission from 1918 to 1919.

== Construction and commercial service, 1902–1918 ==
Arizonan was launched in 1902 at San Francisco, California, by the Union Iron Works as the commercial cargo ship SS Arizonan for the American-Hawaiian Steamship Company. She was completed early in 1903 and entered commercial service. Arizonan and her sister ship SS Alaskan—which later served in the U.S. Navy as USS Alaskan (ID-4542)—represented, according to a contemporary account, the "most advanced practice in the construction of ocean-going freighters and ... a most important addition to the American merchant marine." Intended exclusively for carrying freight, Arizonan was designed as a very strong ship with a large stowage capacity.

After the United States entered World War I in 1917, Arizonan came under the control of the United States Shipping Board, which placed her in service under a United States Army account with a U.S. Navy Naval Armed Guard detachment aboard.

== United States Navy service, 1918–1919 ==
=== World War I service ===
In the summer of 1918, plans were made to have Arizonan manned by the U.S. Navy for the Army account. The Commandant of the 5th Naval District was authorized to fit out the ship for operation by the Naval Overseas Transportation Service (NOTS) as long as the turnover could be accomplished without delaying the loading of the ship's next consignment of cargo. Accordingly, the Shipping Board transferred Arizonan on 10 August 1918 to the U.S. Navy, which gave her the Naval Registry Identification Number (Id. No.) 4542A (sometimes written as 4542-A), and commissioned her on 14 August 1918 as USS Arizonan as she lay at an Army pier in Norfolk, Virginia.

On 16 August 1918, Arizonan moved to Newport News, Virginia, where she took on cargo, including 50 trucks as a deck load, earmarked for the American Expeditionary Force in France. Underway on the morning of 30 August 1918, she crossed the Atlantic Ocean in convoy and, after a brief stopover at Gibraltar from 17 September 1918 to 18 September 1918, reached Marseille, France, late in the afternoon of 21 September 1918 and, over the ensuing days, discharged her cargo.

Departing Marseille on 18 October 1918, Arizonan returned to Newport News in ballast, reaching the Chesapeake and Ohio Railway piers on the evening of 7 November 1918. Four days later, on 11 November 1918—the same day upon which the armistice with Germany was signed, ending World War I – Arizonan moved out into the stream, opposite the Newport News Shipbuilding and Drydock Company yards. After a drydocking and repairs, she departed for New York City on the afternoon of 18 November 1918.

=== Postwar service ===
Undergoing further repairs and alterations first at the Shewan and later at the Morse Drydock company yard, Arizonan was taken in hand for conversion to a troop transport, her armament being removed at the Morse Drydock yard. Reassigned to the Cruiser and Transport Force on 14 December 1918, Arizonan remained at the Morse yard until late in January 1919 before shifting to one of the U.S. Army's major terminals, Bush Terminals, at Brooklyn, New York, to load additional gear in line with her recent metamorphosis into a troopship.

Subsequently, underway on the afternoon of 26 February 1919, Arizonan streamed paravanes soon after sighting the European coast on 11 March 1919, indicative of the precautions taken against any naval mines which might still be in French waters. She reached Bassens, France, a northeastern suburb of Bordeaux where the U.S. Army had built a port facility during the war, on the evening of 12 March 1919. She discharged her cargo there, then moved to Pauillac, France, where she embarked "doughboys" for their trip home to the United States after their World War I service in France. She returned to Bush Terminals at Brooklyn on 3 April 1919.

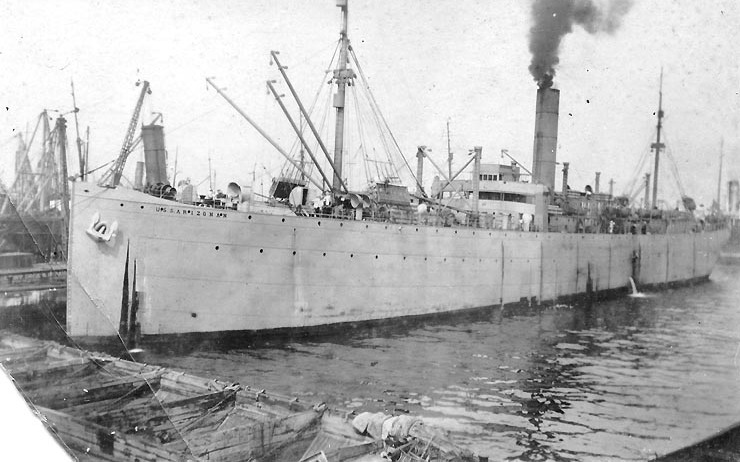
Arizonan as a troop transport in 1919.

Arizonan departed Bush Terminals on 12 April 1919 for Bordeaux, where she embarked troops. She returned to Bush Terminals with them on 20 May 1919. She proceeded from Bush Terminals again on 7 June 1919; this time she embarked troops at St. Nazaire, France, and returned to Bush Terminals on 6 July 1919.

Arizonan left Bush Terminals on 11 July 1919 for her fourth voyage to Europe as a troop transport. On 15 July 1919, during her outbound voyage, she encountered the disabled Naval Overseas Transportation Service troop transport USS Edward Luckenbach (ID-1662) and towed her 425 nautical miles (787 kilometers) back toward Boston, Massachusetts. The United States Coast Guard cutter USCGC Ossipee joined the two troop transports on the afternoon of 17 July 1919. On the morning of 19 July 1919, Ossipee took over the towing duty from Arizonan, freeing Arizonan to continue on her voyage to France. Arizonan ultimately made port at St. Nazaire on the morning of 30 July 1919.

Completing her loading of return cargo – accomplished with an unusual labor force consisting of French stevedores and German prisoners-of-war – by 19 August 1919, Arizonan embarked a comparatively small group of passengers (14 U.S. Army officers, six field clerks, and four enlisted men) and got underway that morning for the United States. Reaching Hoboken, New Jersey, on 2 September 1919, Arizonan finished discharging cargo and disembarking her passengers by 11 September 1919 and shifted to the Shewan's yard later that day. She then moved to Hoboken on the afternoon of 17 September 1919. Over the ensuing days, workmen removed and dismantled the trappings of a troopship.

As Arizonan lay moored alongside the U.S. Navy troop transport USS Pretoria at Pier 9, Army Docks, Hoboken, she was decommissioned on 29 September 1919. Her name was struck from the Navy List that same day.

== Commercial service from 1919 ==
Returned to the American-Hawaiian Steamship Company, the ship operated under the flag of that company as SS Arizonan until she was transferred to Japanese ownership sometime during 1927 or 1928. She disappears from mercantile records soon after that, suggesting that she was scrapped at the end of the 1920s.

SS Arizonanwas in operation in 1942 under American Control with US Navy Armed Guard on board, 114 April 1943 and 11 July 1943. Unsure if this is the same ship but same name and type could have been taken back in Dec 1941 as War prize.
