= Thomas C. Cochran (historian) =

American historian

Thomas Childs Cochran
- Born: April 29, 1902; New York City, U.S.
- Died: May 2, 1999 (aged 97); Haverford, Pennsylvania, U.S.
- Education: New York University; University of Pennsylvania
- Occupation: Historian

Thomas Childs Cochran (April 29, 1902 – May 2, 1999) was an American economic historian. He is considered a pioneer in that field. He was the author of several books.

== Early life ==
Thomas C. Cochran was born on April 29, 1902, in Manhattan. He received his bachelor's and master's degrees from New York University before obtaining his doctorate from the University of Pennsylvania.

== Career ==
Cochran was elected to the American Philosophical Society in 1953. Cochran taught at N.Y.U. for almost twenty-five years before joining the University of Pennsylvania in 1950, where he became Benjamin Franklin Professor of History, a position from which he retired in 1972. He was elected to the American Academy of Arts and Sciences in 1971 and also president of the American Historical Association the following year.

In the mid-20th century, Cochran was one of the most significant economic historians of the United States, producing The Age of Enterprise (1961), an important work on the history of American capitalism. Throughout his career, he attempted to examine the history of business not merely as a narrowly economic topic, but also as a cultural one. He opened up new methodological approaches and areas of research in the field of economic history.

== Personal life and death ==
Cochran was married three times. He died on May 2, 1999, at the Quadrangle Retirement Center in Haverford, Pennsylvania.

== Works ==
- The Pabst Brewing Company: The History of an American Business (1948)
- Railroad Leaders: The Business Mind in Action (1953)
- The American Business System: A Historical Perspective, 1900–1955 (1957)
- A Basic History of American Business (1959)
- The Age of Enterprise (1961)
- Railroad Leaders 1845–1890: The Business Mind in Action (1965)
- Business in American Life (1972)
- The New American State Papers (1973)
- Frontiers of Change: Early Industrialism in America (1981)
- Challenges to American Values: Society, Business and Religion (1985)
