= George Sellery =

George Clarke Sellery
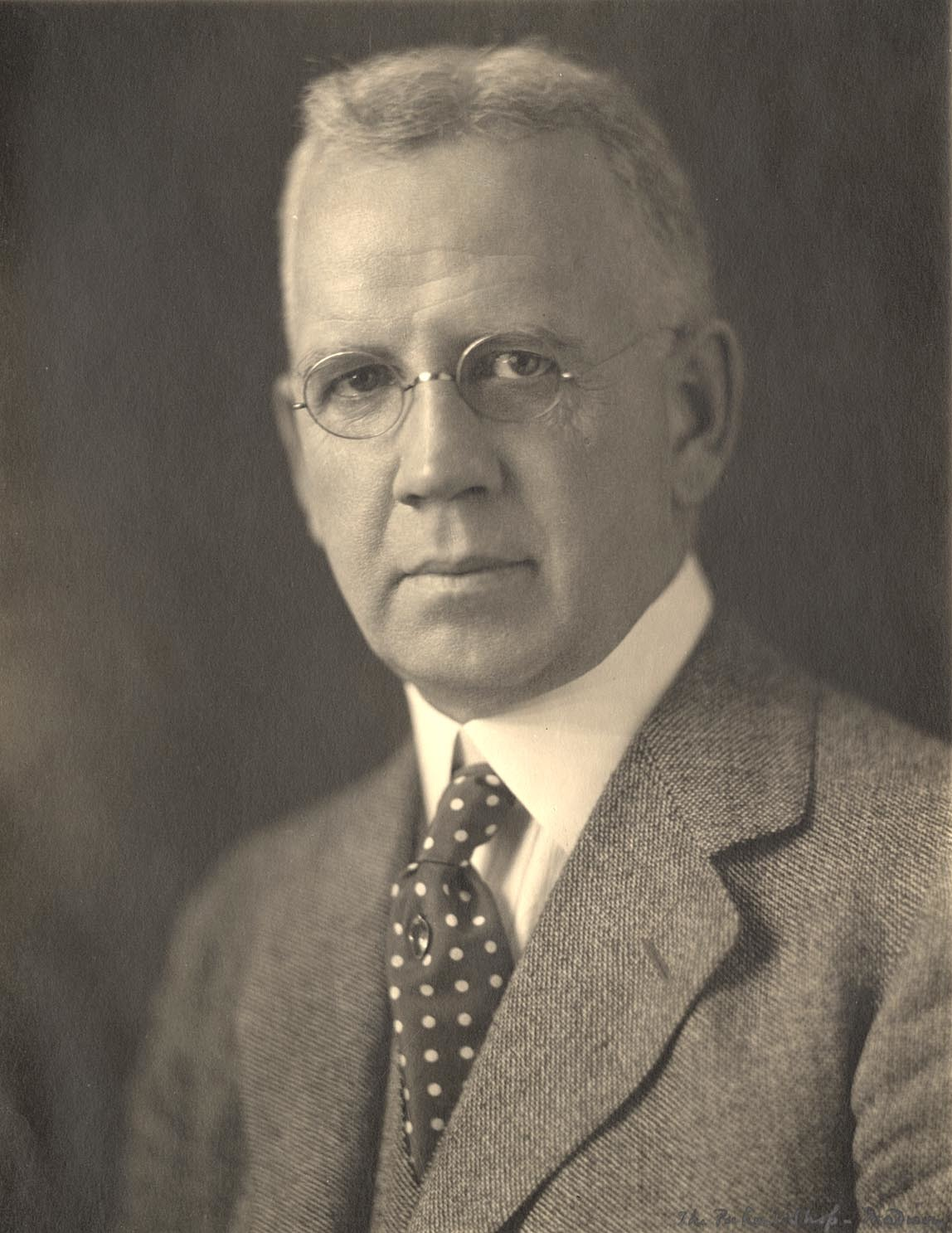
- Sellery, as dean

President of the University of Wisconsin–Madison (Acting)
- In office 1937–1937
- Preceded by: Glenn Frank
- Succeeded by: Clarence Addison Dykstra

Personal details
- Born: January 21, 1872 Kincardine, Ontario, Canada
- Died: January 21, 1962 (aged 90) Madison, Wisconsin, United States
- Education: University of Toronto; University of Chicago
- Occupation: History professor

George Clarke Sellery (January 21, 1872 – January 21, 1962) was dean of the University of Wisconsin–Madison College of Letters and Science and acting president of the university for six months after Glenn Frank's ouster. Prior to these posts, he was a history professor educated at the University of Toronto and the University of Chicago. In his role as dean, he was known as a sharp critic of the University of Wisconsin Experimental College program.

== Early life and career ==
George Clarke Sellery was born January 21, 1872, in Kincardine, Ontario. He graduated from the University of Toronto in 1897, and earned a Ph.D. in history from the University of Chicago in 1901.

== Madison ==
Sellery became a history instructor at the University of Wisconsin in 1901, and was later named a professor in 1909. Sellery directed the UW summer session from 1906 to 1911, and as dean of the University of Wisconsin–Madison College of Letters and Science from 1919 to 1942, when he retired. His salary as dean was $7,500. Even as dean, he continued to give his history courses, which were popular. He was known as a "team player", for his dedication, and he strongly defended faculty interests. Sellery publicly denounced Alexander Meiklejohn and UW President Glenn Frank's Experimental College, which he saw as demeaning the faculty and their institution. This created a rift between Sellery and Meiklejohn–Frank.

Animosity between Sellery and Frank was longstanding. Sellery was rumored to be in line for the UW presidency before Frank's arrival. Near the beginning of his term, Frank had a private investigator make files on Wisconsin key political and educational figures including Sellery. Frank showed these files to Sellery, who noted that his own file wasn't "complimentary". Frank attempted to fire Sellery in the first quarter of 1929, which backfired due to faculty alliance with the dean. When the Board of Regents removed Glenn Frank in January 1937, Sellery served as acting university president for six months.

Sellery died on his ninetieth birthday: January 21, 1962.

Academic offices
Preceded by Glenn Frank	President of the University of Wisconsin–Madison; 1937; Acting	Succeeded by Clarence Addison Dykstra
