= Simon Rosenthal =

American lawyer (1935-2021)

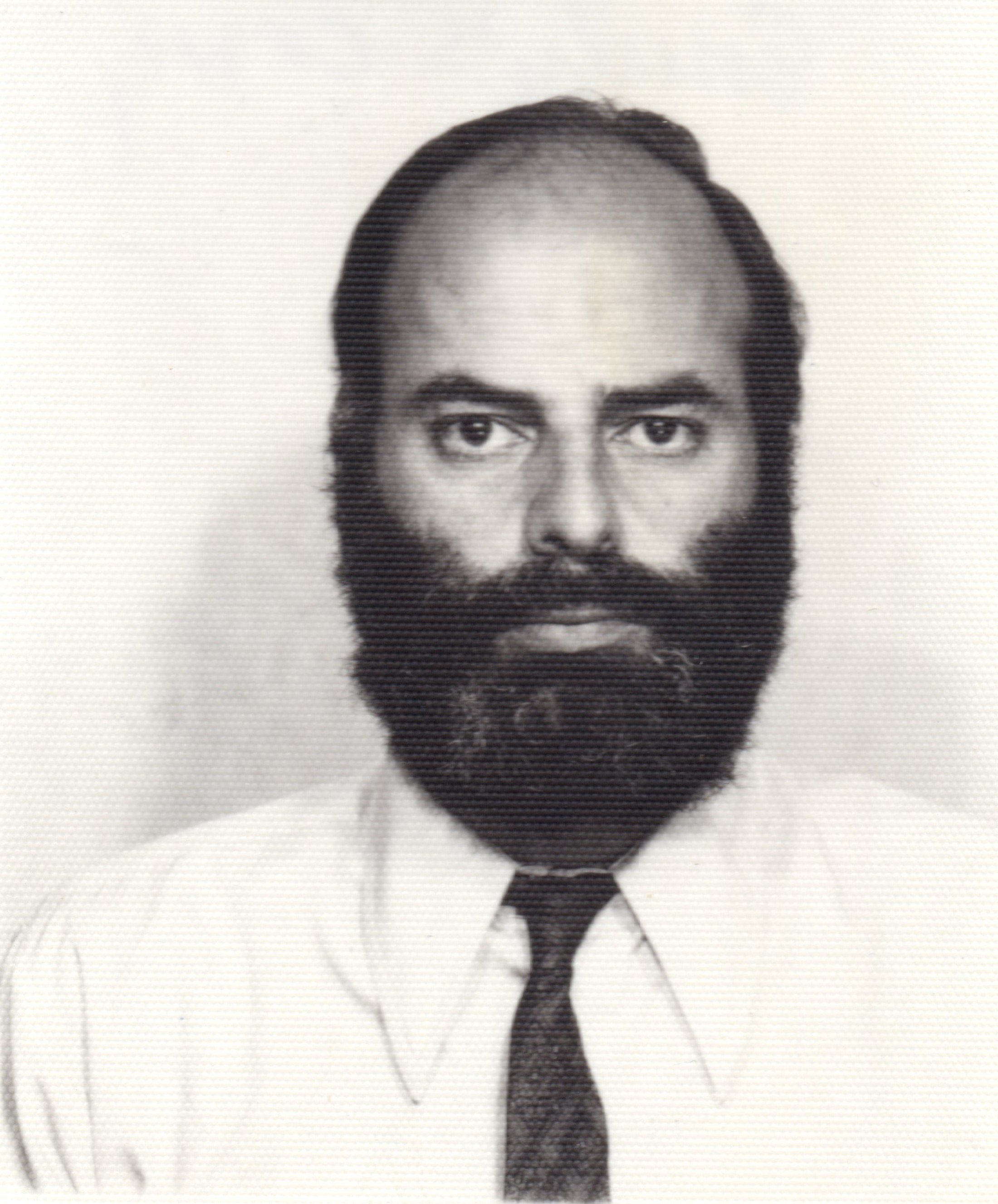
Passport photograph of public-interest lawyer Simon M Rosenthal (1975)

Simon ("Si") Milyus Rosenthal (March 11, 1935 – December 27, 2021) was a public-interest lawyer who worked for regional and national Legal Aid and Legal Services programs and as dean of New College School of Law. A pacifist, when asked by a San Francisco Chronicle reporter for an "example of obscene wealth" in 1983, Rosenthal responded: "The MX missile. The military is wasting our society's resources in the most obscene way. The money could be used for human services, cancer cure research, jobs and lower interest rates so people could afford housing."

Rosenthal, "a pioneer in the Legal Services poverty program", believed the public interest is advanced by fighting for individuals’ rights under the law and by trying cases that set precedents and help bring institutional change for the advancement of all people's interests.

== Childhood and education ==
Born on March 11, 1935, in New York City, he was the only child of Louis M. Rosenthal and Rebecca ("Ruth") Wittes Rosenthal. In the late 1930s, the Rosenthals moved from Manhattan to Teaneck, N.J. He joined the NAACP and the American Civil Liberties Union in 1955. Rosenthal earned his bachelor’s degree in business from the University of Southern California in 1957 and his law degree from UCLA in 1960.

== Career ==
=== Public defender ===
During law school, he clerked for the Alameda County public defender's office. After being admitted to the California Bar in January 1961, Rosenthal began working as a public defender in Alameda County; he and Julia Ann Karrer, a nurse from Dublin, Ohio, married in April. He joined the National Lawyers Guild and the National Legal Aid & Defender Association (NLADA), speaking at conferences and publishing op-ed pieces. After 18 months with the public defender’s office, Rosenthal and his wife took a camping trip across Europe, including a guided tour of the U.S.S.R.

=== Legal Aid ===
At the end of 1962 they returned to California. As an attorney with the Legal Aid Society of Alameda County at its Oakland office, Rosenthal was a pioneer in the War on Poverty (announced by President Lyndon B. Johnson in his 1964 State of the Union address and enacted on Aug. 20, 1964). In addition to helping with day-to-day legal problems, Rosenthal wanted to bring test cases to the appellate courts in order to change precedents, running "a significant law reform oriented program" by filing suits against entities such as collection agencies that at the time preyed on migrant workers and the poor.

At a time when the new national Legal Services program was battling resistance from local and state Bar associations, Rosenthal and many members of the Lawyers Guild were championing federally funded neighborhood legal aid offices. In 1966 Rosenthal was named the first full-time director of the Legal Aid Society of San Mateo County, based in Redwood City, Calif., where he opened four regional offices.

=== Office of Economic Opportunity ===
From 1968 through 1970, Rosenthal worked in Washington, D.C., as national deputy director and chief of the evaluation division of the Office of Legal Services, part of the former U.S. Office of Economic Opportunity (OEO) at the time. The OEO’s Legal Services Division employed 3,000 attorneys in funded programs around the country.

When Richard Nixon took office as President Jan. 20, 1969, he began to defund and dismantle the OEO, appointing Donald Rumsfeld as its director in May 1970. The appointment of Rumsfeld signaled doom to Rosenthal and his boss, Terry F. Lenzner. In a letter to Rosenthal’s wife, Lenzner wrote, “I just want to tell you how much I appreciate your … letting us keep your husband for several more months. Si has been a tremendous help to me in these last few months as Director of Legal Services, and I felt that he would be of invaluable assistance for the future in the fight to save Legal Services.” Lenzner was quoted later in The New York Times: “Mr. Lenzner said that Donald Rumsfeld, then director of the poverty agency, had ordered Mr. Lenzner to discharge Mr. Rosenthal because of information in the file that Mr. Rosenthal had subscribed to radical magazines and had belonged to the Lawyer’s (sic) Guild, a left-leaning legal organization.”

Rosenthal resigned from the Office of Legal Services and moved back to California, rejoining the Legal Aid Society of San Mateo County, where he served as director from 1971 until 1975. He also chaired the National Project Advisory Group of Legal Services Programs in 1972 and 1973; served in local and national bar associations, and was on the NLADA’s board of directors and executive committee from 1973 to 1975, and again in 1978. By 1974, his marriage was ending and Rosenthal moved to La Honda, Calif.

=== New College of California School of Law ===
In 1976 Rosenthal was named dean of the New College of California School of Law in San Francisco, a position he held until 1978. At New College, Si developed its accreditation application and secured a real estate grant from the U.S. government that contributed to the college’s financial stability. After stepping down as dean, Rosenthal continued to serve on the New College board of trustees. He moved from La Honda to San Francisco, and in 1981 he joined the NLADA’s civil division technical assistance committee.

=== Legal Services and pacifist activism ===
From 1974 and throughout 1980s, Rosenthal worked as a consultant for Legal Services Corporation and traveled around the country for the national office, evaluating programs and giving management training and coaching. He was an adjunct professor at Stanford University, Cañada College, and Catholic University Legal Aid Directors Management Training. "Mr. Rosenthal is a gentleman of particularly enlightened views," wrote James Leavitt, Administration of Justice Program, Cañada College, "a unique combination of administrative abilities, professional expertise and practical political experience." Along with Ying Lee-Kelley, the Hon. Thelton Henderson, and Linus Pauling, Rosenthal was elected to the Meiklejohn Civil Liberties Institute’s board of directors in 1985. "Maybe I'm over-personalizing my anger at the madness of the militarism in this country. It's a threat to me, a threat to my family,” Rosenthal wrote. “Our children. It's a threat to all children."

== Personal life ==
Among Rosenthal’s political mentors was Ann Fagan Ginger, founder and executive director emerita of the Meiklejohn Civil Liberties Institute in Berkeley. One of his friends was Oscar Zeta Acosta (the “Brown Buffalo”), and Rosenthal persuaded Acosta to join Legal Aid as an attorney. Acosta became a leader of the Chicano Movement, and he dedicated his first novel, The Autobiography of a Brown Buffalo, to Rosenthal.

Rosenthal and Julia Karrer had two children; their marriage ended in 1974. He met his second wife in 1996, and they lived in New York City during the last 10 years of his life. After moving to the west coast in 2021, Rosenthal died at home on Dec. 27, 2021, aged 86. His archives are in the National Equal Justice Library, Georgetown University Law Center, Washington, D.C.
