= Education and Democracy =

Biography of Alexander Meiklejohn by Adam R. Nelson

- Author: Adam R. Nelson
- Language: English
- Subject: History of education, biography
- Published: 2001 (University of Wisconsin Press)
- Publication place: United States
- Pages: 440
- ISBN: 978-0-299-17140-7
- Dewey Decimal: 370
- LC Class: LB875.M332N45

Education and Democracy: The Meaning of Alexander Meiklejohn, 1872–1964 is the first full biography of Alexander Meiklejohn written by Adam R. Nelson and published by the University of Wisconsin Press in 2001. The title is not a complete biography but draws from five archives to show Meiklejohn through his own words. A popular figure in the early 20th century who has since faded, Meiklejohn was a philosopher and university president who championed unified knowledge, idealism, and Great Books curricula. The book is split into five sections based on the locations in which Meiklejohn lived: his undergrad, faculty, and administrative years at Brown University, his presidency of Amherst College, his time with the University of Wisconsin Experimental College, and his experience with adult education and free speech advocacy at Berkeley. Nelson portrays Meiklejohn as "contradictory, paradoxical, and quixotic" as he grapples with how to encourage students to pursue freedom and how a teacher can teach this while respecting student freedom.

== Publication ==
Education and Democracy: The Meaning of Alexander Meiklejohn, 1872–1964 is a biography of Alexander Meiklejohn written by Adam R. Nelson and published by the University of Wisconsin Press in 2001. In lieu of writing a definitive account of Meiklejohn's life, Nelson portrayed Meiklejohn through the subject's own language to let him "speak for himself". Nelson draws on five archives detailed in copious quotations and a 65-page notes and annotated bibliography appendix. While Meiklejohn was popular in the early 20th century and best known for his stance on academic freedom, he had become a marginal figure by the time this book was published. The book was the first full biography written on Meiklejohn, preceded only by dissertations and a 1981 "short 'biographical study'" that introduced Meiklejohn's written work. (Note: The "short 'biographical study'" is Cynthia Stokes Brown's 1981 Alexander Meiklejohn: Teacher of Freedom (University of California Press).) Nelson's title is a response to John Dewey's Democracy and Education. It intends to show the contrast of Meiklejohn's idealism opposite Dewey's pragmatism.

== Summary ==
=== Work ===
The work is split into five parts based on the places in which Meiklejohn lived: his undergraduate education at Brown University, his later administrative work there, his presidency of Amherst College, his University of Wisconsin Experimental College, and his work with adult education and other actions in Berkeley. At the core of Meiklejohn's effort to create systems that promote democratic citizenship, Nelson argues, is "the paradox of Socratic teaching": how a teacher can make a student want freedom and how a teacher can teach this while respecting the student's freedom in practice.

=== Education and its effect in his belief system ===
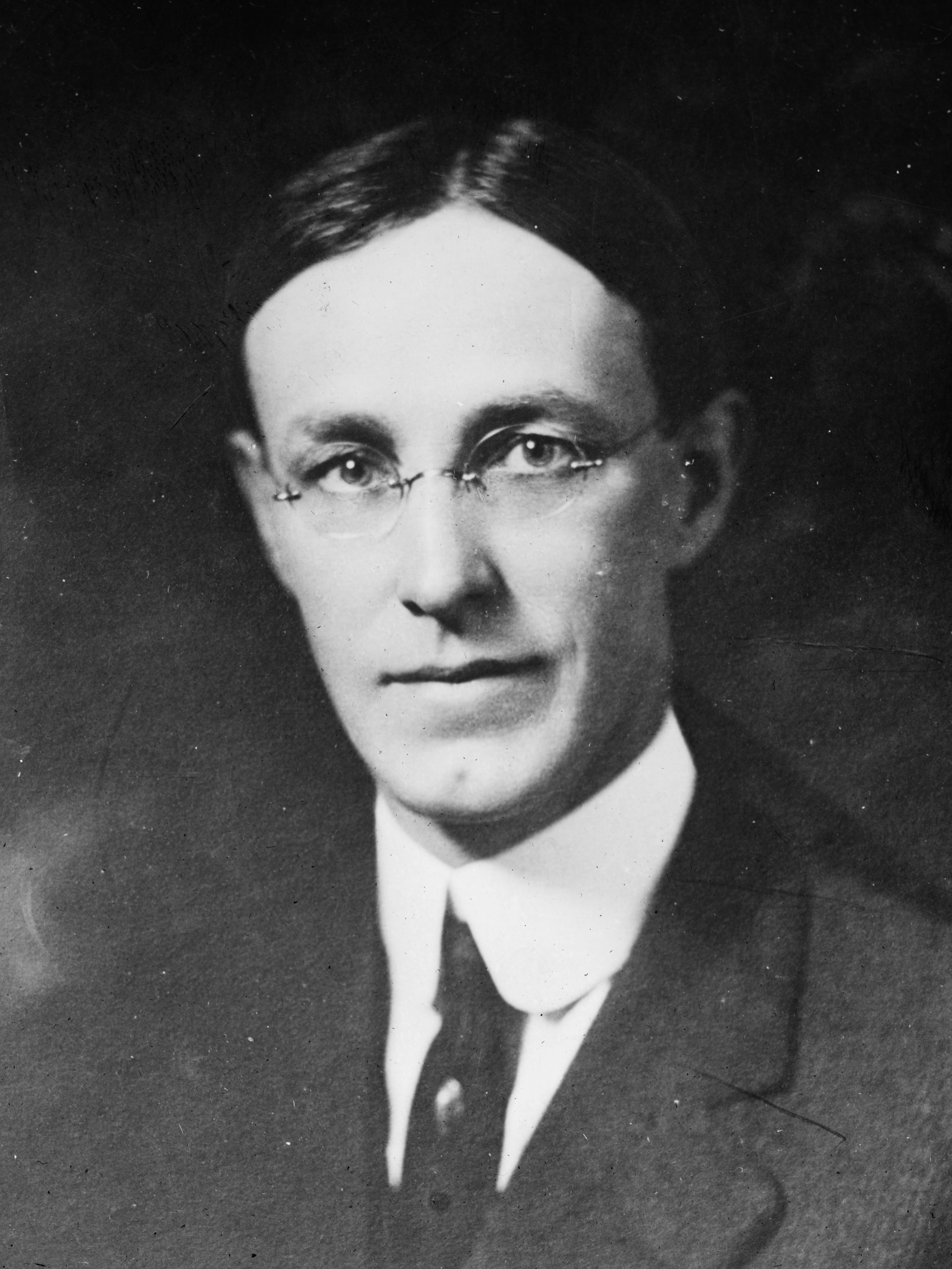
Alexander Meiklejohn

Meiklejohn was born in Great Britain and raised in Rhode Island. He attended Brown and Cornell University, and later returned to the former as a popular ethics professor and its consequent dean of admissions. In place of the popular elective system and science curriculum, he championed a Kantian style of education with unified knowledge, moral development, and pursuit of ideals, and a style of democratic governance where students would lead and reason through their own education. Meiklejohn saw democracy as something imparted and reconsidered by passing generations, and that it was borne in "strong discussions around agreed terms". His suggested curriculum for a unified knowledge included one or two years of ancient Greek classics and added years of enlightenment or modern American classics.

Meiklejohn became Amherst College's president in 1912. Meiklejohn developed a legacy of autocratic treatment of faculty, drastic overspending, and that of a college hermetically detached from demands of the outside world. He was ousted after lying about faculty appointments, whereupon he opened the Experimental College at the University of Wisconsin, a two-year Great Books program with readings from ancient Greece and modern America. There, too, he treated the program as unaccountable to outside influence, and did not produce reports of their work or build rapport with the outside Wisconsin community. The program quickly closed for reasons attributed to Meiklejohn's obstinance and not programmatic design. Meiklejohn then opened a Great Books adult education program in San Francisco where students similarly self-governed and led their own education. As funding dissipated at the outset of World War II, the students chose to shutter the school before "compromising" their ideals. Meiklejohn became an advocate of free speech as an absolute right differentiated from physical action. His stances on this and democracy influenced the United States Supreme Court and the aims of UNESCO.

Nelson portrays Meiklejohn as "contradictory, paradoxical, and quixotic". Despite believing in free thought and the primacy of student choice in determining their own education, he held incontrovertible stances. Nelson compares Meiklejohn to fellow educator Woodrow Wilson: "idealists who occasionally allowed the enthusiasm of their vision to impede the integrity of their leadership". Meiklejohn's students often defied his wishes, overturning a ban of professional baseball student players at Brown, enlisting in the army at Amherst, and choosing anarchy over student government at Wisconsin. Meiklejohn was an idealist who shunned the pragmatism of figures like John Dewey. Meiklejohn's idealism required charismatic and "demanding" tutors for any student who agreed to the minimum of open-minded participation in seminar.

== Reception ==
The biography is considered the first on Meiklejohn. Reviewers noted the clarity of Nelson's intellectual contextualization of Meiklejohn's work, but wanted additional information about what Meiklejohn thought about comparable programs, educational precedents, and luminaries in the field. Other reviewers marked the book's balance, completeness, and importance in resurfacing Meiklejohn as a major figure in the history of American education.

Dominique Marshall (Labour/Le Travail) compared Nelson's clear presentation of Meiklejohn's philosophy to Meiklejohn's own accessible practice of philosophy. Marshall described Nelson's intellectual and political contextualization surrounding the eras of Meiklejohn's life as having "surprising variety". Mary Ann Dzuback (The Journal of American History) thought that the book was not riveting, as par for the genre, but that the work was "thoughtful and compelling". She affirmed Meiklejohn's importance for his experiments and attempts to make educational programs capable of producing a democratic society. Dzuback praised Nelson's use of student quotes and his analysis of Meiklejohn's written work, but wanted for more context, such as how Meiklejohn compared with other educational figures in higher education, how other contemporary Great Books programs impacted his thought, and where he stood in the overall history of American education. Marshall too remained curious about Meiklejohn's views on the family's role in civic education. Jinting Wu (Education Review) complained of too much intellectual context in areas and of unresolved contradictions in Meiklejohn's metaphysical claims.

Scot Guenter (American Studies) considered the biography "particularly timely" for the post-September 11 relevance of Meiklejohn's democratic experiments in the face of the privatization of higher education, and of Meiklejohn's courage towards free speech. He wrote that Meiklejohn's views on curriculum would arouse "needed" reflection in college instructors, and that the book's audience should include university administration and those interested in civil liberties as well as historians and philosophers of education. Guenter appreciated how Nelson presented the shortcomings of Meiklejohn's ego and spendthrift lifestyle. Robert Sherman, writing for the History of Education Quarterly and reflecting on the depth of the appendices, struggled to consider "how such a work could be more complete". He wrote through Louis Menand that Meiklejohn's "certitude [led] to violence" and that by letting him speak for himself, Nelson made the French philosopher Charles Renouvier's point that only individuals are certain and that there is no greater certainty. Guenter added that the biography read best in the parts where Nelson was clearly inspired by Meiklejohn's zeal and idealism, particularly the "What Does the First Amendment Mean?" chapter, which Guenter considered essential reading.
