= University of Wisconsin Experimental College =

Two-year college designed and led by Alexander Meiklejohn

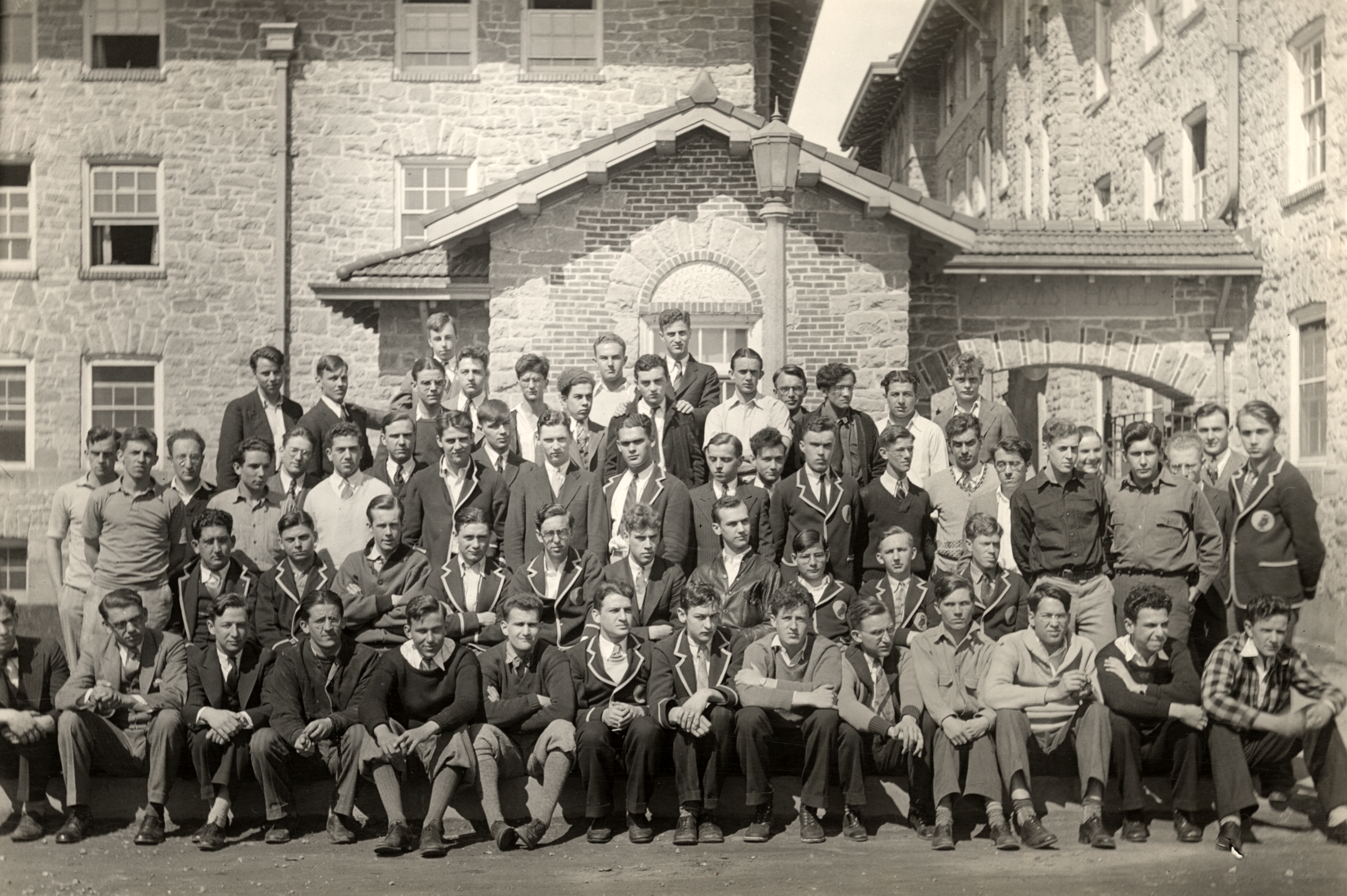
- Students outside Adams Hall, 1930
- Active: 1927–1932
- Affiliations: University of Wisconsin
- Director: Alexander Meiklejohn
- Location: Madison, Wisconsin, United States

The University of Wisconsin Experimental College was a two-year college designed and led by Alexander Meiklejohn inside the University of Wisconsin–Madison with a great books, liberal arts curriculum. It was established in 1927 and closed in 1932. Meiklejohn proposed the idea for an alternative college in a 1925 Century magazine article. The magazine's editor-in-chief, Glenn Frank, became the University of Wisconsin's president and invited Meiklejohn to begin the college within the university. Despite pushback from the faculty, the college opened in the fall of 1927 with a self-governing community of 119 students and less than a dozen faculty. Students followed a uniform curriculum: Periclean Athens for freshmen and modern America for sophomores. The program sought to teach democracy and to foster an intrinsic love of learning within its students.

The college's students became known as free spirited outsiders within the university for their different dress, apathetic demeanor, and greater interest in reading books. The college's demographics were unlike the rest of the university, with students largely not from Wisconsin and disproportionately of Jewish and East Coast families. The college developed a reputation for radicalism and wanton anarchy, especially within Wisconsin. The students lived and worked with their teachers, called advisers, in Adams Hall, away from the heart of the university. They had no fixed schedule, no compulsory lessons, and no semesterly grades, though they read from a common syllabus. The advisers taught primarily through tutorial instead of lectures. Extracurricular groups, including philosophy, law, and theater clubs, were entirely student led.

The Great Depression and lack of outreach to Wisconsinites and UW faculty led to the college's slow decline. Enrollment decreased every year, exacerbated by its statewide reputation. After his son was expelled in 1931 by dean and Experimental College critic George Sellery, Meiklejohn recommended the college's dissolution. Public criticism of the college included student radicalism, lack of discipline, administrative issues, and financial issues. Meiklejohn wrote a retrospective of the college, which philosopher John Dewey reviewed favorably and noted for its contribution to educational philosophy. University of Wisconsin faculty and regents voted to dissolve the college in May 1932. Some advisers stayed to teach in the university, and Meiklejohn remained briefly before moving to Berkeley, California. The Experimental College influenced programs internal to the university, and was the precursor to its Integrated Liberal Studies undergraduate program.

== Background ==
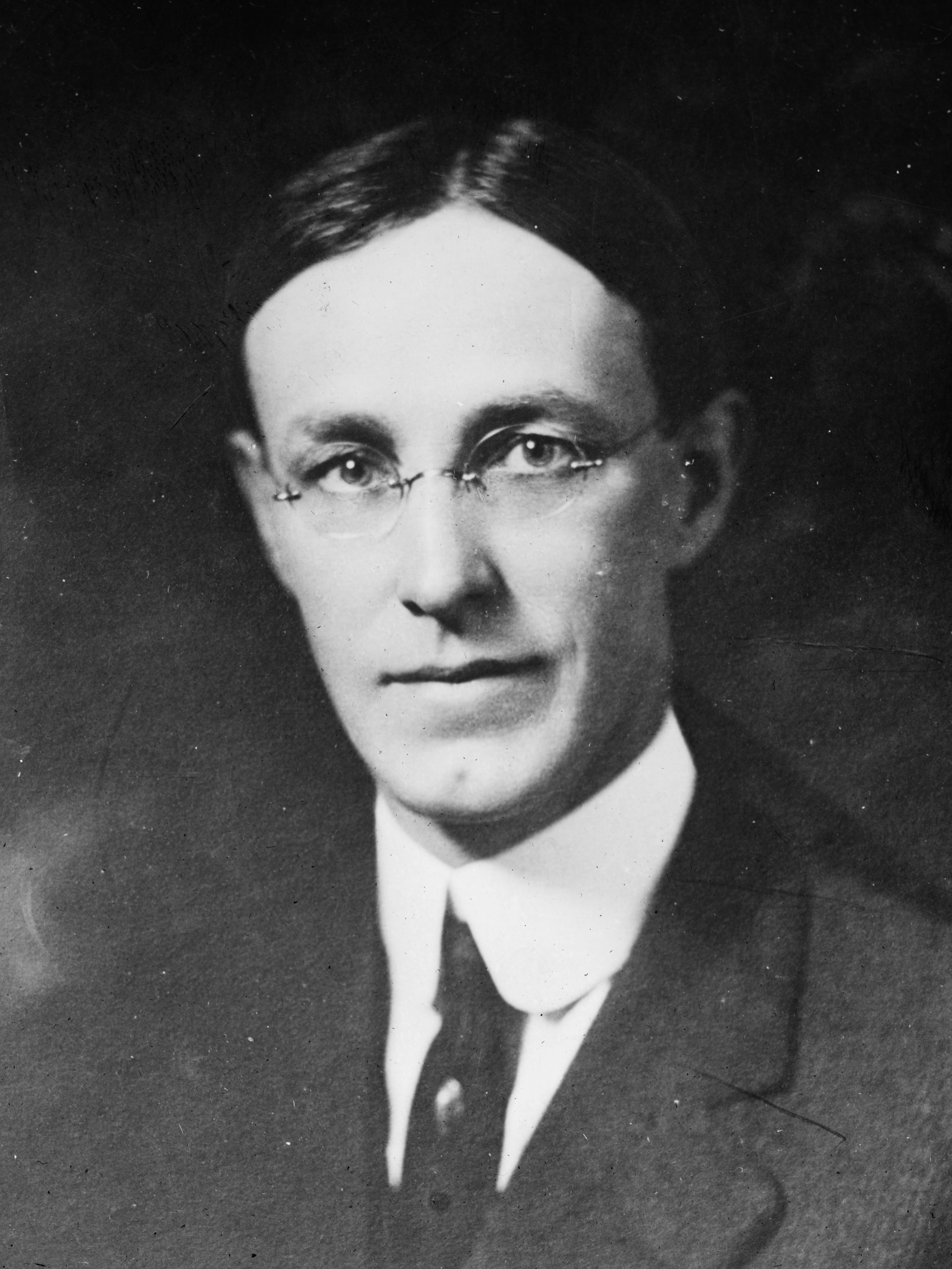
Alexander Meiklejohn

In June 1923, Alexander Meiklejohn had been asked to step down as president of Amherst College. He was recruited specifically to revitalize the college a decade earlier with the views on education for which he was known. Meiklejohn announced curriculum reform with a singular focus on "understanding human life as to be ready and equipped for the practice of it", and subsequently made the humanities coursework more interdisciplinary, added social sciences courses, and attracted new faculty members interested in the Socratic method. Meiklejohn had student support, but clashed with senior faculty and alumni, and was ultimately removed due to his administrative mismanagement and not his educational reforms.

Meiklejohn resolved to open a new, experimental liberal arts college in late 1924, but struggled to find funding. Seeking $3 million for the venture, he was rejected by Bernard Baruch and Abraham Flexner but through support from The New Republic's Herbert Croly was offered planning funds from the magazine's main benefactor. The planning team included journalist Mark Sullivan, New School professor Alvin Johnson, and The Century Magazine editor-in-chief Glenn Frank. Frank had previously published Meiklejohn's work (Note: Frank published two books about Meiklejohn: one on his Amherst public addresses on college education, and one on Meiklejohn's ouster from the college, which was sympathetic in tone.) and was sympathetic to his cause.

In January 1925, Century published Meiklejohn's plan for a new and "experimental" college, "A New College: Notes on a Next Step in Higher Education". The proposed college would have a "unified" two-year curriculum and closer ties between faculty and students, who were to be "coequal partners". Meiklejohn called for a small school with a maximum of 35 professors and 300 students, with tutorial as the chief means of instruction. The planned program eschewed division by academic discipline and preferred holistic study of human civilization, particularly ancient Athens and the contemporary United States. The school sought to foster students who understood themselves in the context of their surrounding society as a "total human undertaking". Meiklejohn wanted students who would independently volunteer to live in self-governance. Meiklejohn biographer Adam Nelson wrote that for the 1920s, this idea of voluntary interest in study "seemed almost laughable". The augmented liberal arts program was a departure from vocational education trends of the time, as was its emphasis on smaller classes in a time of large lectures for burgeoning college populations.

Frank stepped down from the magazine in May 1925 to become the incoming president of the University of Wisconsin (UW). He invited Meiklejohn to open his school there and offered him a distinguished professorship. Meiklejohn planned the experimental college in secret and moved to Madison in January 1926 to teach in the philosophy department. Meiklejohn finished his experimental college proposal by April 1926. It was similar in style to his Century article and became codified as the Experimental College based on its colloquial reference in correspondence between Meiklejohn and Frank. Meiklejohn presented his proposal to the All-University Study Commission convened by Frank "to investigate the first two years of liberal college work". The university faculty received the proposal apprehensively, and criticized its vagueness, lack of control group, costliness, and effect on their livelihoods. It was eventually approved on the condition that the faculty could review its details and regular progress. The Wisconsin legislature approved two years of funding, and the Experimental College was scheduled to open in fall 1927.

Meiklejohn prioritized compatibility in his staff selection, and so hired ten of his friends who could work in "intimate fellowship". The college received hundreds of faculty applications in the summer of 1926, and the final makeup included six from Amherst, two from Brown, and one from Scotland, mostly in idealist philosophy and labor economics disciplines. The team met through the winter and into the 1927 spring to plan the program. They received 119 applications even though the program was unadvertised. Half of the applicant pool was interested in working with Meiklejohn specifically, and he was excited to work with "an entirely self-selected and therefore truly democratic community of learning."

== Program ==
Meiklejohn's Experimental College proposal called for two years of compulsory and interdisciplinary study of civilizations: ancient Athens for freshmen, and contemporary America for sophomores. The plan had students and teachers living and working together in the same residence hall with no fixed schedule, no compulsory lessons, and no semester grades, but a common syllabus. Their only grade was to be the single final exam. The college aimed "to inspire students to want to learn" and to teach democracy through "the intrinsic value of learning" over bribery, coercion, and physical violence.

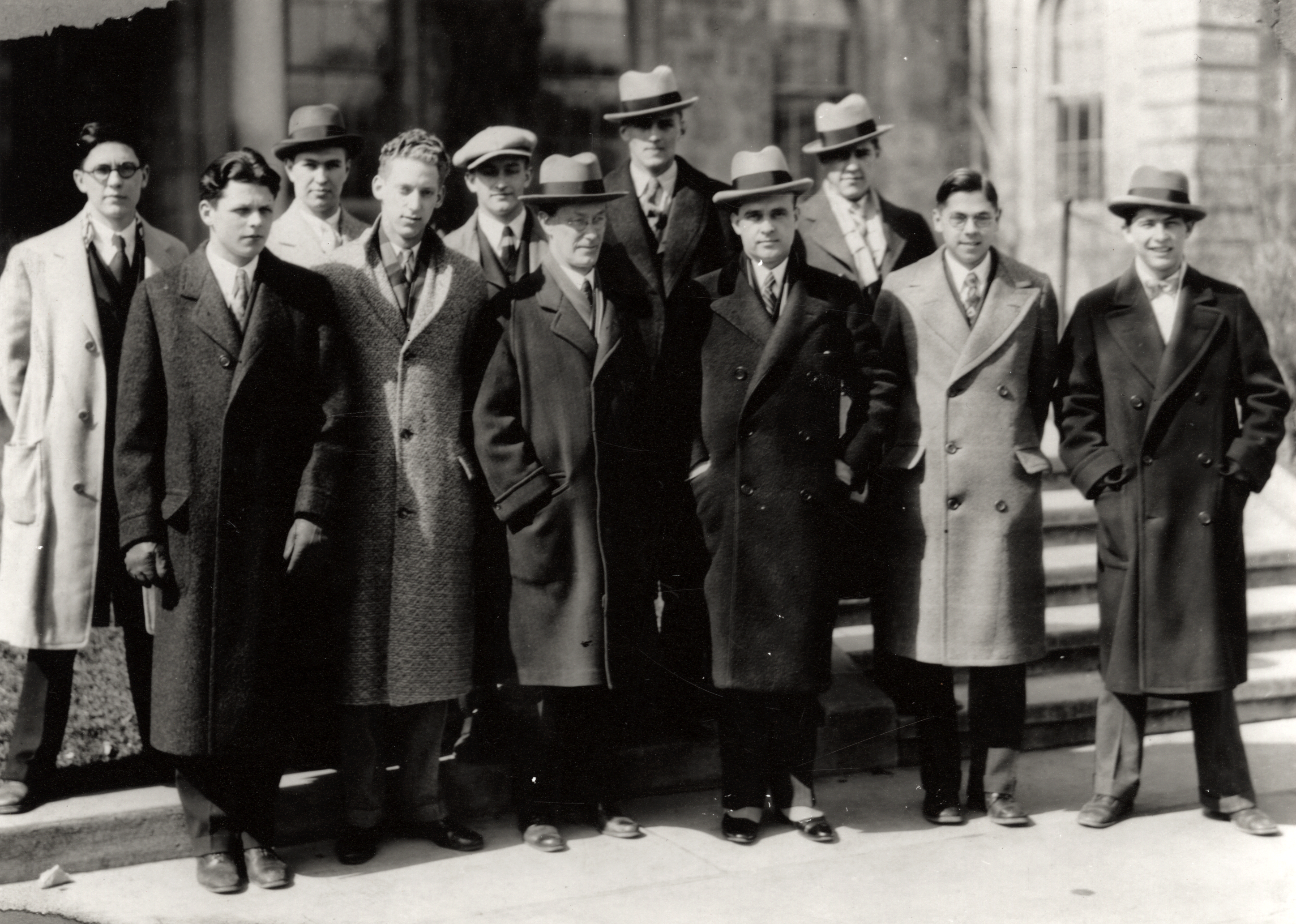
Meiklejohn and Frank (center) among the Experimental College advisers, March 15, 1928

The teachers, called advisers, would instruct via small, weekly tutorials and occasional schoolwide lectures on their personal research. Adviser appointments were split with two-thirds in the Experimental College and one-third in the rest of the university, a compromise between Meiklejohn and the College of Letters and Sciences. The program's budget and appointments were negotiated directly with President Frank, bypassing the UW College of Letters and Science and its dean, George Sellery.

Meiklejohn saw books as the main instrument of a liberal education, and chose a great books curriculum so as to model the human intellect he wished to impart and to connect the timeless philosophical questions that occupy all such works. He wanted his college to read the same books and to debate the same questions simultaneously. Meiklejohn did not prefer one "great book" over another and saw them as interchangeable and in pursuit of the same essential questions about goodness, justice, and truth. Freshmen studied ancient Athens in the age of Pericles, reading authors such as Aeschylus, Herodotus, Homer, Plato, Thucydides, and Xenophon. Meiklejohn's curriculum accentuated the author's thoughts behind the work as related to general questions about society, and forwent emphasis on the texts themselves.

Plato's The Republic was the freshman year capstone, as "the apex of literary and philosophical achievement in ancient Athenian thought" and the book that best embodied their civilization. Meiklejohn asked the students to synthesize how the contents of their first year were "interrelated in the experience of the individuals and of the community as a whole". Over the summers, Meiklejohn assigned Middletown studies where students drew conclusions about American society based a view of their hometowns as typical of society. The returning sophomores were expected to exhibit self-regulation as the primary regulator of their understanding, to educate themselves self-sufficiently, and to wean themselves of the college institution. This freedom was taught so as to empower students towards independence while the advisers continued to hold pedagogical power. Henry Adams's The Education of Henry Adams was the sophomore year capstone, chosen for its complexity, self-criticism, and study of modern America's development. Meiklejohn biographer Adam Nelson compared the Ex College curriculum and Adams's autobiography as both lamenting "the tragedy of lost spiritual and intellectual unity" and enabling students to relate "their literary and lived experiences".

=== Extracurriculars ===
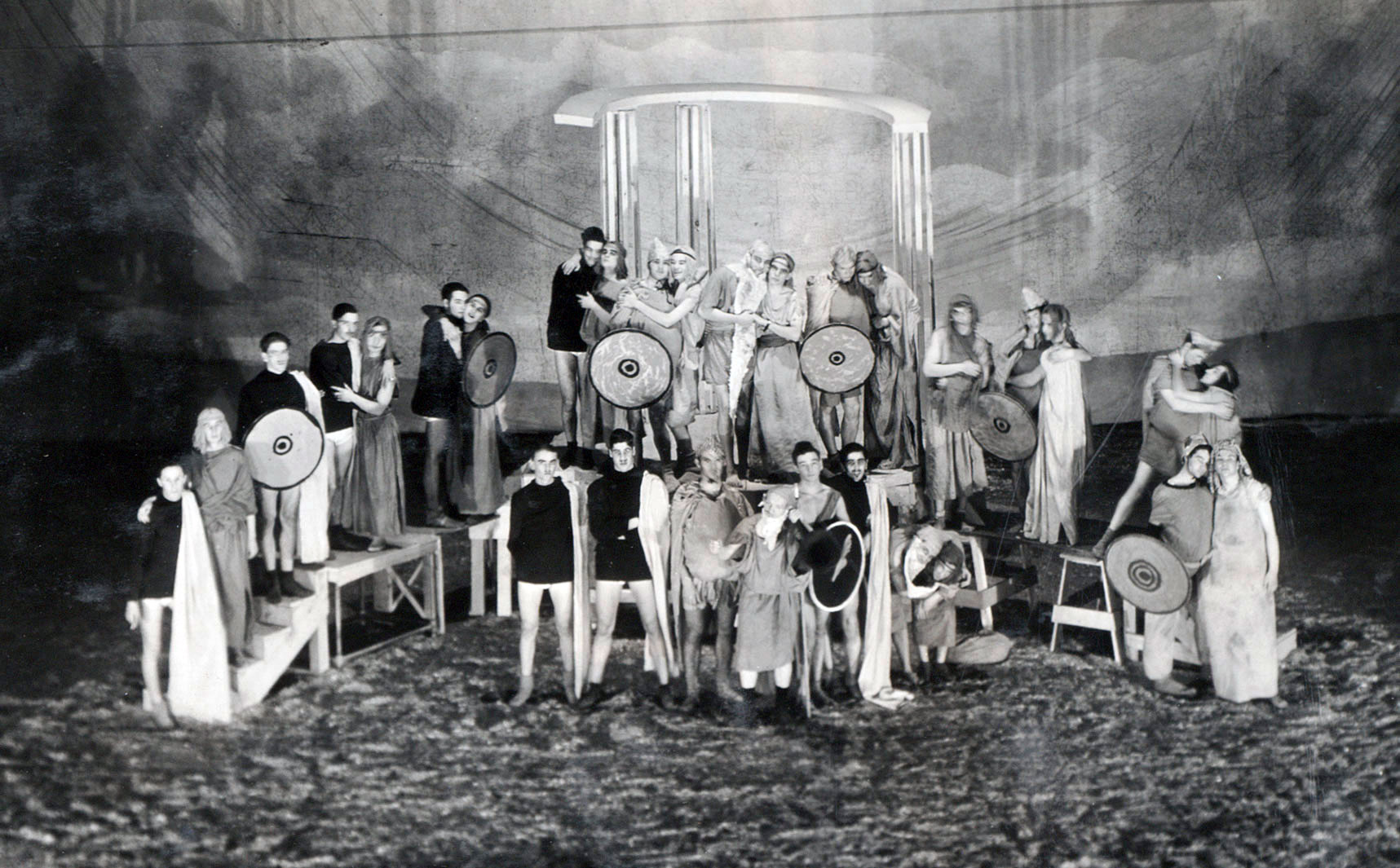
Cast of the Experimental College's fall 1928 production of Lysistrata

All extracurricular groups were student-led. Clubs included the Philosophy Club (held weekly at Meiklejohn's house), the Law Group, the Forum, and the Experimental College Players (a theater troupe). The Philosophy Club discussed topics such as the self and the relation between philosophy and science, for which Meiklejohn invited Clarence Ayres from Amherst to speak. The Law Group discussed liberty, state action, and laissez-faire, while the Forum discussed current events like war, behaviorism, and imperialism. The Players performed classical plays including Antigone, The Clouds, Euripides's Electra, and Lysistrata, which caused a particular stir for its cross-gender acting in erotic scenes. The English department chair and dean of women both castigated President Frank for letting the play run. Meiklejohn also invited several prominent speakers, including Bertrand Russell, Clarence Darrow, Frank Lloyd Wright, and Lewis Mumford.

=== Facilities ===
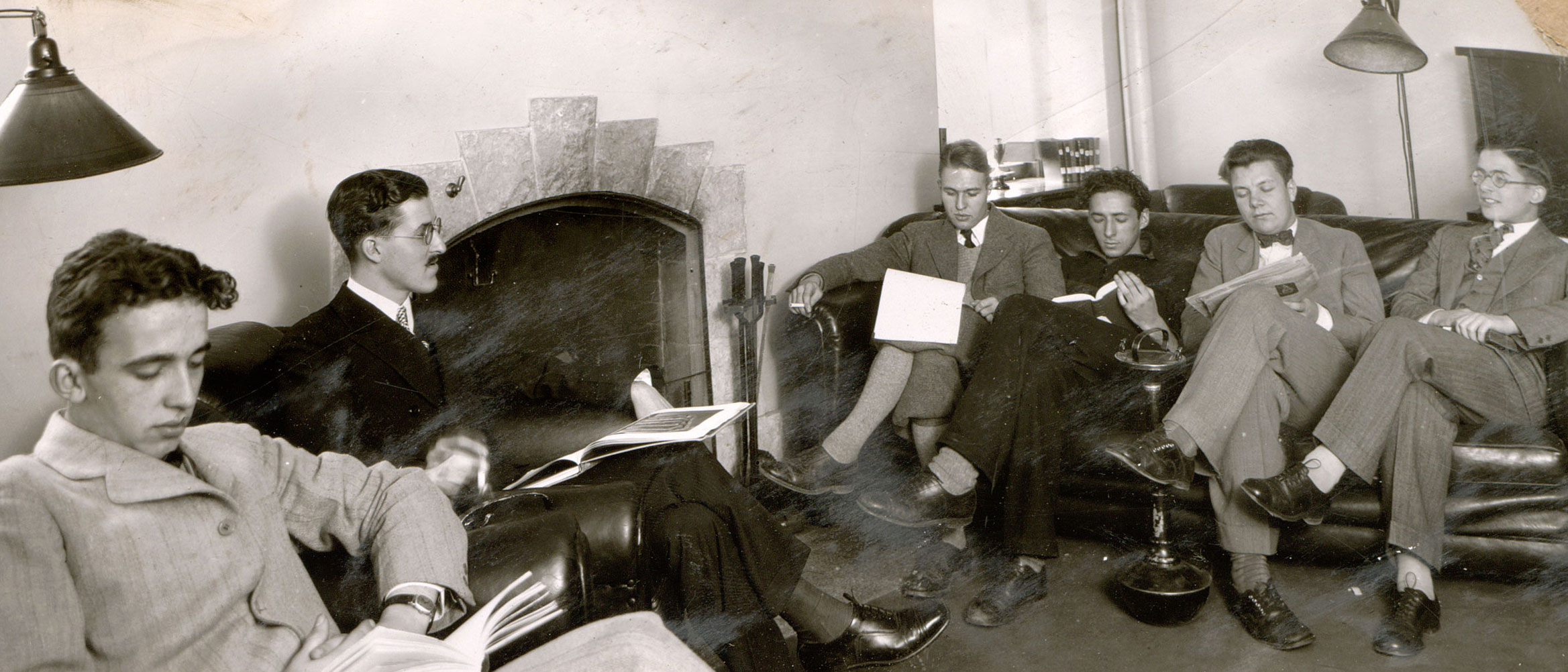
College men in the Adams Hall den, December 15, 1927

The college was based in Adams Hall, where students and their advisers lived and worked by the shore of Lake Mendota (except for Meiklejohn, who lived in a large house several blocks away). Adams Hall was constructed in 1926, with a Renaissance-style quad and eight identical divisions, each with its own common room, den, and facilities for 30 students, two advisers, and a fellow. The surrounding facilities afforded abundant sporting opportunities, and the site offered distance from the city and university. The students shared part of Adams Hall with non-Experimental College students, and the nearby common dining hall with the UW students in Tripp Hall. The other students were said to be bothered by the Experimental College's disregard for property, rambunctiousness, noise, and dining hall biscuit fights.

== Rise ==
The first class arrived in fall 1927. The incoming Experimental College class was more diverse than the larger university's population. One third of students hailed from Wisconsin (as opposed to 90 percent in the university), most were from urban areas (the East Coast had particularly strong representation), one third were second-generation immigrants, and Meiklejohn estimated their Jewish population at 40 percent. The college was all-male, due in part to space availability and the regents' refusal of mixed-sex living arrangements, in keeping with American college conventions. The students were largely well-versed in current affairs, with higher scores on entrance exams and lower high school grades than their UW counterparts. Meiklejohn appreciated the challenges of reconciling this diversity and related this task to those facing the country's democratic governance.

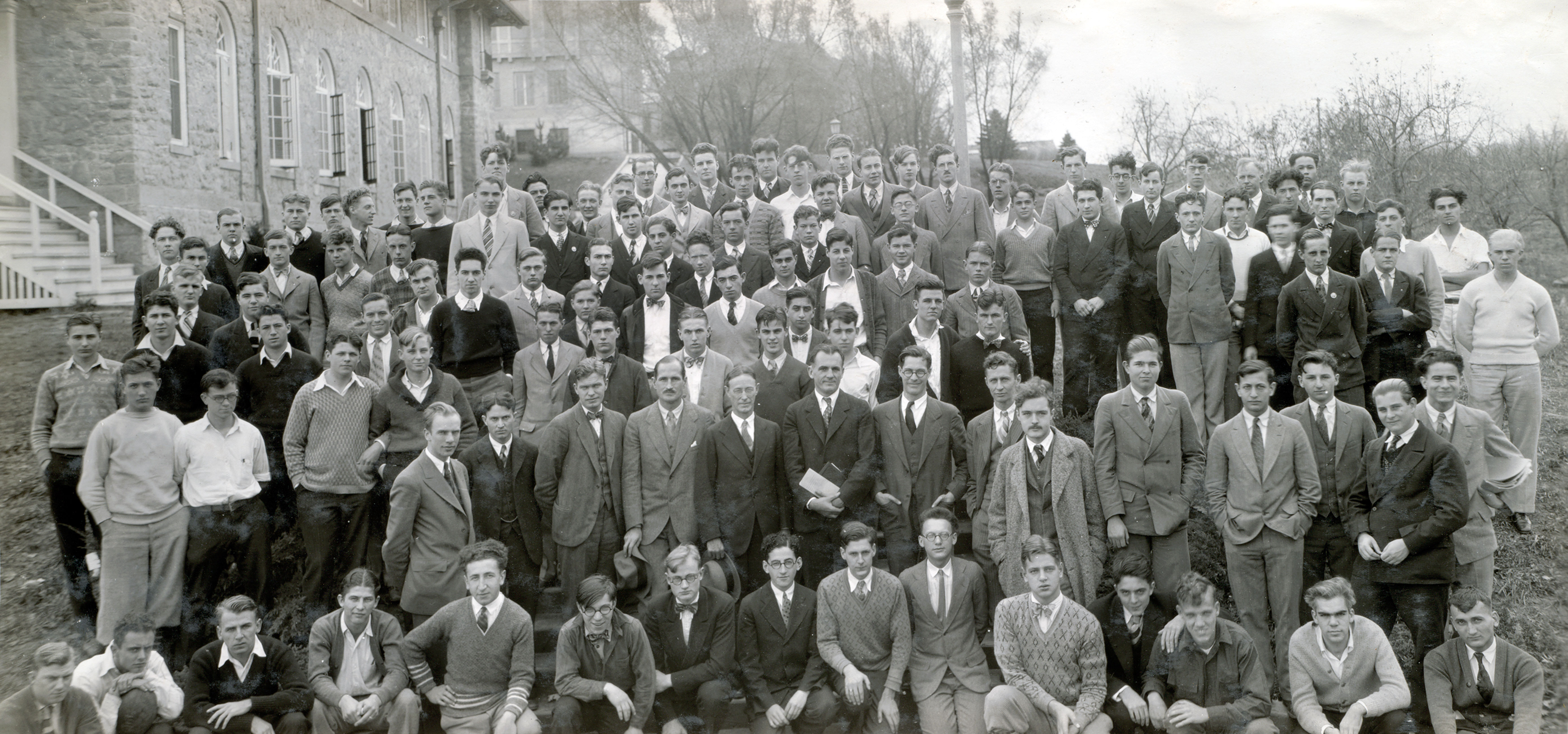
The first Experimental College class, 1927

Meiklejohn recommended student government to the fall 1927 class, but they couldn't decide on its form and ultimately voted against government. Put another way, they democratically voted against democratic governance in favor of anarchy. This disappointed Meiklejohn, but he thought they would eventually change their minds.

As freshmen struggled with the Athenian curriculum, he reverted to classification by academic discipline and offered companion texts in the field of the current work studied. In their dorms, the college students were known for their lack of respect for property, with three times the breakage in dorm assets than the rest of the university. Meiklejohn saw this as desirable and indicative of abetting nonconformity, and did not attempt to curb it. Meiklejohn had full reign over the college, so the university and its disciplinary proceedings could not intervene. Upon their exit two years later, students transferred to a number of Ivy League and prominent state universities. By this time, the college was known throughout the nation and Europe.

The college was reputed to be a radical institution. A judge presiding over a case involving three students in a socialist march declared the school "a hotbed of radical activity". Meiklejohn bemoaned this characterization of his school and blamed the college's media prominence for disproportionate coverage of an avant-garde minority. Two such cases included a former student who announced his Communist Party gubernatorial bid from jail, and another who organized a labor march with the college's students that ended in a face-off described as "bearded 'Experimenters'" against varsity athletes "bent on 'smashing the heads of the Reds'". The Experimental College students acted differently from those of the rest of the university. They grew beards, wore their hair long, carried an air of conspicuous apathy, and did not tend as meticulously to their outward presentation. They developed a tradition of wearing dark blue blazers with pearl gray trim, emblazoned with the owl of Athena, worn in the "spirit of fellowship" and to set the college apart from the university. Many of the advisers (including Meiklejohn) were indeed progressive-minded activists.

Despite their stereotypical "queerness", The Daily Cardinal reported in 1930 that a majority of Experimental College students participated in sport, and that a number joined intramural teams, pledged for Greek life, and joined campus clubs. However, the students abnormally read an average of 16 non-assigned books each semester and had an average of "only two dates a month", which the paper considered abnormal amid hints of homosexuality. As these claims became widespread, Meiklejohn imported psychiatrist Frankwood Williams from New York to study the students' sexual habits. He found the students to be "warped and twisted" as "normal for ... their age", praised the program for aiding their psychosexual growth where others inhibit, and concluded that the advisers made the students subservient to their demands even as they spoke in praise of student autonomy.

== Decline ==
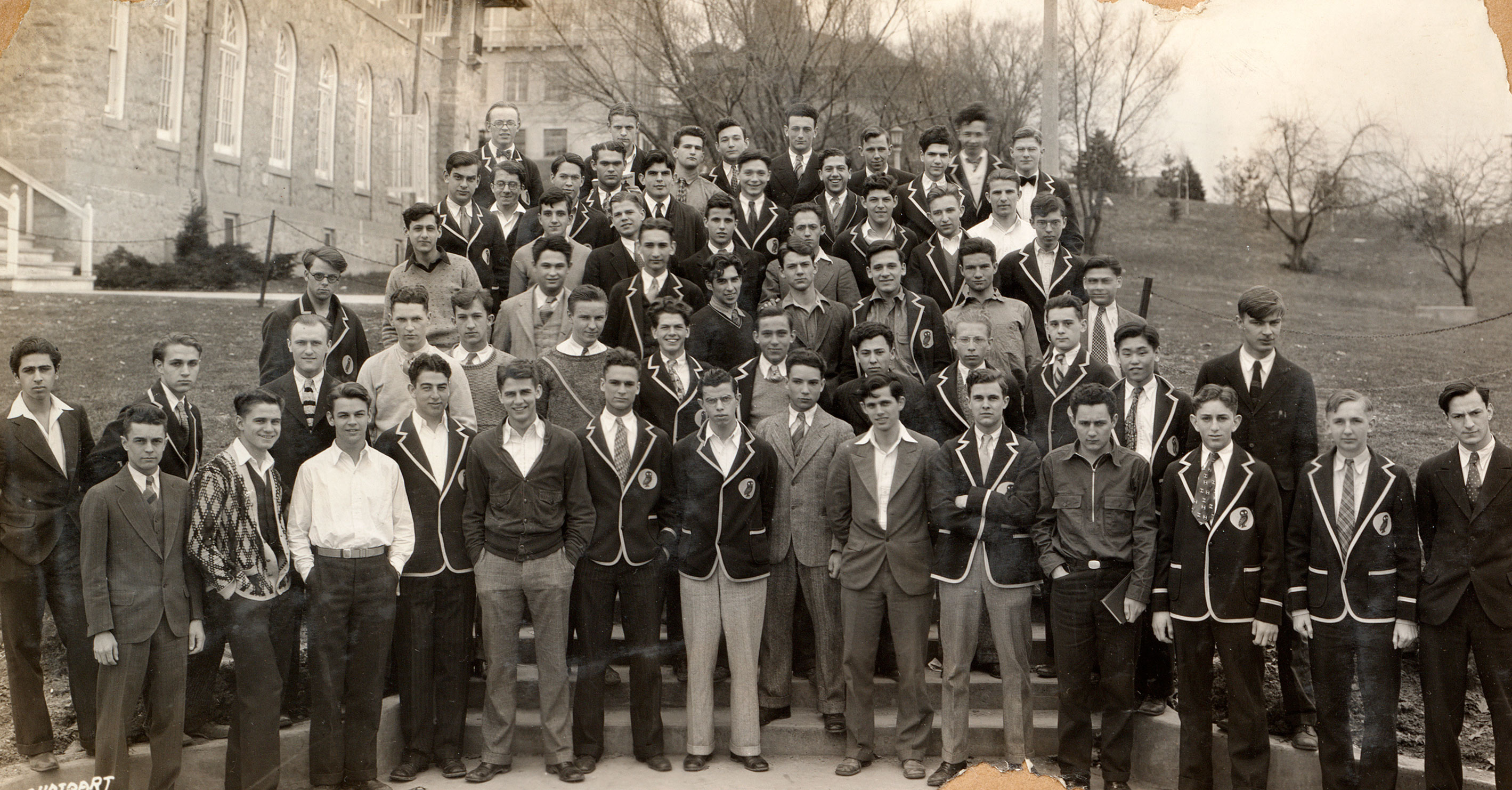
Freshman class, March 21, 1929

With the onset of the Great Depression in 1929, the Experimental College began a slow decline. Many students couldn't afford tuition, fewer had additional savings, and several dropped out. Along with books and campus salaries, the Experimental College became a budgetary luxury during a time of economic need for both students and the state, and its funding was in jeopardy. Meiklejohn started an Experimental College interest-fee loan fund for unfunded students, and asked advisers and monied students to donate. During this period, some sophomores absconded the college for two weeks to live like the vagrant hobos who traveled the Midwest by rail looking for work. They returned to write papers about their experiences, which Meiklejohn is said to have appreciated for its syncretism of experience and the great questions grounded in their readings.

A 1930 faculty review of the curriculum questioned the program's focus and choice of civilizations. The advisers entertained the Enlightenment, Middle Ages, and Renaissance as alternatives to their ancient Athens curriculum, but ultimately did not change course. By early 1930, Meiklejohn began to show a loss of faith in the experiment and in education reform, chiefly in the ability to teach "rational self-criticism". Around the same time, Meiklejohn received letters from the Baraboo, Wisconsin, schools superintendent and a Baraboo judge noting the Experimental College's sordid reputation in the state and its habit of repelling "ordinary" students whose parents were uninterested in the ramifications of such an education. Within the community, a January 1930 student committee reported a widespread lack of individual responsibility in their living arrangements. Parents began to complain about the college's public esteem, the qualities forming in their sons, and the curriculum. The experiment was in ill repute.

Enrollment dropped every year since the program's inception such that, when compounded by dropouts, the program was below half-capacity three years later. UW President Glenn Frank had warned of decreased enrollment in August 1928 and of its consequences for the college. UW College of Letters and Science Dean George Sellery offered support conditional on codified discipline and uniform final exams, which Meiklejohn refused. Sellery later refused to allow transfer students into the college. Meiklejohn wrote letters to Wisconsin high schools in April 1929 that acknowledged the college's stereotypes and welcomed demographic change, but the campaign backfired. He sent an adviser to tour the state and solve what he saw as a communication issue. The adviser found high school seniors largely interested in vocational training, and that the prospect of traditional college excited students to the point where they did not consider improvements upon that model. The adviser found students uninterested in the Experimental College's prospects.

The locals saw Meiklejohn as an outsider. He was foreign to Madison in his politics, social life, and personality. Dean Sellery and President Frank's professional relationship was untrusting and contemptuous, which extended to Meiklejohn due to his close association with Frank. Sellery had the support of the faculty, who were envious of the Experimental College advisers' arrangements for higher salaries. In objection to the college's reputation for radicalism, the son of the man who endowed Meiklejohn's professorship revoked his funding. Frank needed the donor's support, and so the incident marked Frank's waning support for the college. Sellery spoke out against the Experimental College in the first quarter of 1929, and Frank attempted to fire him in response. In 1931, Sellery received letters from spies who found Meiklejohn's son Donald, a philosophy doctoral student at the university and a part-time Experimental College adviser, engaged in sex acts against university policy. Sellery pursued expulsion and denied Meiklejohn and his son's separate requests for a lesser punishment. A week later, Meiklejohn asked the advisers to close the college.

Common public explanations for the college's closure include student radicalism, lack of discipline, administrative issues, and financial issues. The Nation's Eliseo Vivas blamed its lack of grades as detrimental to student incentive, and judged the effort to create self-motivated students through freedom to be a failure. In School and Society, Professor Grant Showerman also credited the college's freedoms and lack of compulsions with its demise. Proponents of the Experimental College painted it as the foil of a conservative, standard college, and blamed educational stagnation on the existing order. Meiklejohn believed in a liberal education's power to change society through imagining alternatives to the status quo. He aimed to produce students who could counterbalance society with independence of thought, but admitted that he did not know how to facilitate this.

The University of Wisconsin faculty and regents voted to end the Experimental College in May 1932. There was a farewell banquet for 250 guests in June 1932. Meiklejohn did not judge the college's success by its permanence, which he did not expect—he said he attempted the college as a test. Meiklejohn asked Sellery to give his graduate student advisers university assistantships, but was denied. Meiklejohn began to work on adult education in the University of Wisconsin Extension Division in July 1932, where some of the Experimental College's ideas took hold. He later moved to Berkeley. Advisers who stayed after the program's end—such as classicist Walter Agard, philosopher Carl Bögholt, and political scientist John Gaus—were known as popular and innovative, and Agard became the Classics department chair.

== Legacy ==
Meiklejohn wrote a retrospective of the Experimental College during the first half of 1932. John Dewey reviewed the published book and declared it "a contribution to the philosophy of American education". He saw the college to be a true expression of liberal education as it fostered rational faculties and self-criticism, and noted the college's place in fighting norms on a much larger timescale. For its ability to produce free-thinkers in an age without similar values, Dewey found the college "a tragic success".

Meiklejohn's Experimental College 30th anniversary address, St. John's College, Annapolis, Maryland, May 10, 1957

Experimental College alumni celebrated reunions in 1942 at the University of Chicago, in 1957 at St. John's College in Annapolis, Maryland, and in 1962 back in Madison. At St. John's, Meiklejohn addressed the audience and read his favorite poets. Over a hundred alumni announced a fund for the Alexander Meiklejohn Award for Academic Freedom through the American Association of University Professors. At the Madison reunion, alumni announced the Alexander Meiklejohn Lectureship on the Meaning and Methods of Education for Freedom. Their reunions featured notably intellectual speakers, and would take on the air of their college discussions. Over the next two decades, Meiklejohn would return to speak in Madison at the behest of the Memorial Union Forum Committee and philosophy department.

In The University of Wisconsin: A Pictorial History, Arthur Hove states that the Experimental College "had little discernible influence beyond the university", though it served as a prototype for the university's Integrated Liberal Studies (ILS) program, spawned interest in learning, and showed the university's role in making individuals as well as workers. Cronon and Jenkins' The University of Wisconsin: A History, 1925–1945 notes the college's recognition as the "best known example of [Wisconsin] curricular innovation" at the time, and blamed the college's closure on the depression but more so "the hubris of its architects" for not evangelizing its value to Wisconsinites and UW faculty. Cronon and Jenkins also saw the college's influence in Charles Russell Bardeen's fourth-year medical school preceptor program, the academic recommendations from the 1930 Fish and 1940 Daniels Committees, and the inception of Integrated Liberal Studies. Similar to the Experimental College, the Integrated Liberal Studies started in the late 1940s was a great books, liberal arts, tutorial curriculum. It was developed in part by Agard, the Classics professor and former Experimental College adviser. An English professor described ILS's ambience as that of a "small college" within a large university. Meiklejohn received an honorary Doctor of Letters degree from Madison in June 1964, where he was escorted by the first ILS director, Robert Pooley.

A 1939 announcement described him as "one of the university's greatest teachers". Notable alumni include Victor Wolfson, a Broadway playwright and founder of the college's theater group.

== References and notes ==
Notes

Sources

- Cronon, E. David; Jenkins, John W. (1994). The University of Wisconsin: A History, 1925–1945. Vol. 3. Madison: University of Wisconsin Press. ISBN 978-0-299-14430-2.
- Hove, Arthur (1991). The University of Wisconsin: A Pictorial History. Madison: University of Wisconsin Press. ISBN 978-0-299-13000-8.
- Nelson, Adam R. (2001). Education and Democracy: The Meaning of Alexander Meiklejohn, 1872–1964. Madison: University of Wisconsin Press. ISBN 978-0-299-17140-7.
