= Ray Ginger =

American historian (1924–1975)

- Born: Raymond Sydney Ginger; October 16, 1924; Memphis, Tennessee, U.S.
- Died: January 3, 1975 (aged 50); Boston, Massachusetts, U.S.
- Occupations: Author; historian; biographer; professor; journalist
- Spouse(s): Ann Fagan (m. 1944, divorced) Evelyn Geiger (m. 1956, divorced) Victoria Granley
- Children: 2

Academic background
- Education: University of Michigan (BA, MA); Western Reserve University (PhD)

Academic work
- Discipline: History
- Sub-discipline: Labor history, economic history
- Institutions: Harvard Business School; Brandeis University; University of Calgary; Wayne State University
- Notable works: The Bending Cross (1949)

Raymond Sydney Ginger (October 16, 1924 – January 3, 1975) was an American historian, author, and biographer of wide-ranging scholarship whose special focus was on labor history, economic history, and the epoch often called the Gilded Age. His biography of the American labor leader and socialist Eugene Victor Debs is widely considered definitive, and his account of the Scopes trial has also received high praise. Both titles are still in print, and both, along with many of his other works, have been widely used in college courses across the United States.

== Early life ==
Ginger was born in Memphis, Tennessee on October 16, 1924, the fourth son and next-to-last child of an affluent Southern family that moved to Indiana (Debs' home state) while he was very young. The family soon plunged into abject poverty with the Great Depression. After four years "squatting" in a series of unoccupied houses in Greencastle while their eldest son attended DePauw college, the Ginger family settled in Indianapolis, still in extremely difficult circumstances. These experiences deeply influenced Ray Ginger's political convictions and much of his historical work: in later life he frequently recounted his childhood humiliation when sent to collect the bag of flour that was the only form of public welfare available, and also the intense personal rage that dominated his youth.

== Education ==
Despite his troubled childhood, and the resulting troubled personality, he was accepted to both Harvard College and the University of Chicago before his 17th birthday. He later joked that he chose Chicago in the belief that it would be easier to augment his scholarship with part-time employment "in a big city like Chicago than in a small town like Cambridge." He didn't think to look at a map, and wouldn't have dreamed of asking for advice. At Chicago he soon took a step towards fulfilling his supreme ambition at that time—to become a sportswriter—by landing a post as a copyboy at the Chicago Tribune—"the only time my father was ever really proud of me." As the United States entered World War II, most of the reporters became foreign correspondents, and Ginger was promoted to a writing job in the city room.

His journalistic career was ended by the military draft, but the interruption to his academic education proved only temporary. Soon after basic training, Military Intelligence sent him to the University of Michigan for Japanese language training, where he met his first wife, later civil-liberties lawyer Ann Fagan Ginger. Married in 1944, they had two sons. Ginger was next a code-breaker near Washington—work for which an education in statistical analysis would have been more appropriate than linguistic studies. There, in the closing days of the war, he joined the Communist Party, thinking the revolution was just around the corner.

His interest in Eugene Debs had already begun to crystallize into a determination to write a definitive biography, drawing on both archival sources and interviews with some of the many individuals then living who had known Debs well. Fortunately the recently enacted GI Bill provided an easy means of support for this enterprise. Ann Arbor, which was close to his wife's family home and where he had already accumulated academic credits while studying Japanese, seemed the obvious place to begin; he completed his bachelor's degree there, and then (the book not being finished) stayed for a master's degree in economics. Still drawing on GI benefits in the cause of literature, he then entered a Ph.D. program in American Studies at Western Reserve University in Cleveland, Ohio (now Case Western Reserve University), where he completed The Bending Cross (Rutgers University Press, 1949). This classic biography met great critical acclaim, including an assessment by the eminent American historian Henry Steele Commager as "the best biography of Debs." It has almost never been out of print in the intervening years; Haymarket Books issued the most recent edition in 2006.

== Academic career and blacklisting ==
After earning a Western Reserve Ph.D. in 1951 after having his published biography accepted as his dissertation, Ginger took up a post at Harvard Business School as editor of the Business History Review, with a little teaching on the side. Besides his editorial duties there, he wrote numerous scholarly articles in economics, labor history, and business history, researched a projected biography of Clarence Darrow, and enjoyed every prospect for a distinguished academic career.

The McCarthy Era ended his time at Harvard. When it seemed probable that both Ginger and his wife might be subpoenaed by the Massachusetts equivalent of the U.S. House Committee on Unamerican Activities, on June 16, 1954, Harvard University officials threatened him with immediate dismissal despite his three-year contract if he did not sign an oath declaring that he was not a member of the Communist Party. They required a similar oath from his wife, who had no connection to the university. When Ginger instead chose to resign, Harvard insisted that he leave the state immediately as a condition of receiving the two weeks salary remaining on his existing contract.

Ginger, his pregnant wife, and their small son went to New York on two days notice to stay with relatives they had never met. Ann Ginger gave birth as a charity patient, and the marriage came to a rancorous halt not long thereafter. Ginger worked in New York for the next six years, first in advertising and then as an editor at the book publishers Alfred A. Knopf and Henry Holt. He remarried in 1956 and published two works of history, Altgeld's America and Six Days or Forever?. He remained bitter for being ejected from the academic world and then apparently blacklisted.

== Later career ==
In 1960, Brandeis University offered him an assistant professorship in the history department. He stayed there for six years, becoming a tenured full professor, chairing the Committee on American Civilization, writing several more books, coaching the tennis team, and developing his pedagogy. Upon his death, a former student (William Friedman, Brandeis '65), raised $2.5 million to endow the Ray Ginger Professorship of History at the university.

After leaving Brandeis in 1966, Ginger taught briefly at Stanford University and moved on to tenured positions at Wayne State University in Detroit and the University of Calgary, in Alberta, Canada. He died in Boston in 1975 of liver failure as a result of cirrhosis from acute alcoholism. At the time of his death, he was married to his third wife, Victoria Granley. Most of his papers were presented to the Labor History Archives at Wayne State University, where they are available for scholarly consultation.

== Continuing controversy ==
The details of Ginger's dismissal from Harvard remain unclear.

In September 2000, Ann Fagan Ginger wrote a letter to the Harvard Board of Overseers demanding an apology for Harvard's actions. She also made public FBI files that document Ginger's account of being required to sign an oath. It was the first documented instance in which Harvard had made such a demand. Harvard had publicly announced it would remove members of the Communist Party but not those who refused to answer questions about party affiliation. Harvard replied a few months later, admitting that Ginger had been forced out but not apologizing. Board of Overseers President Sharon Gagnon wrote: "I would not presume to ... second-guess the motives or judgments of individuals in that difficult time. It seems clear, however, that Harvard took an action in the case of Mr. Ginger that many thoughtful people today, looking back, would not find appropriate." Ann Ginger found the response insufficient and said Harvard needed a truth and reconciliation commission to make it face what it had done.

Francis Boyle, law professor at the University of Illinois, and a 1976 graduate of Harvard Law School, has led a national campaign to lobby Harvard to conduct a public inquiry, issue a meaningful apology, and endow a chair in the Gingers' name for the study of peace, justice, and human rights.

== Selected publications ==
- The Bending Cross: A Biography of Eugene Victor Debs (1949)

(Also published as Eugene V. Debs: The Making of an American Radical)

- Altgeld's America; The Lincoln Ideal Versus Changing Realities (1958)
- Six Days or Forever? Tennessee v. John Thomas Scopes (1958)
- Spectrum; The World of Science (1959)
- American Social Thought (1961)
- Age of Excess; The United States From 1877 To 1914 (1965), (2nd ed., 1975)
- The Nationalizing of American Life, 1877–1900 (1965)
- William Jennings Bryan; Selections (1967)
- Modern American Cities (1969)
- Ray Ginger's Jokebook on American History (1974)
- People on the Move: A United States History (1975)
