= Meiklejohnian absolutism =

Interpretation of the First Amendment to the United States Constitution

Meiklejohnian absolutism is the belief espoused by Alexander Meiklejohn, that the purpose of the First Amendment to the United States Constitution is to keep the electorate informed, thereby creating self-governance.

Therefore, all speech, even criticizing the established government, is healthy to the life of democracy. In essence, this means that free speech must be protected not for those speaking, but for those who should hear what they are saying.

This term argues that the burden of proof is on the side of those opposing a liberal interpretation of the 1st Amendment, such as in the "clear and present danger" argument.
