= Queen City, Missouri =

- City
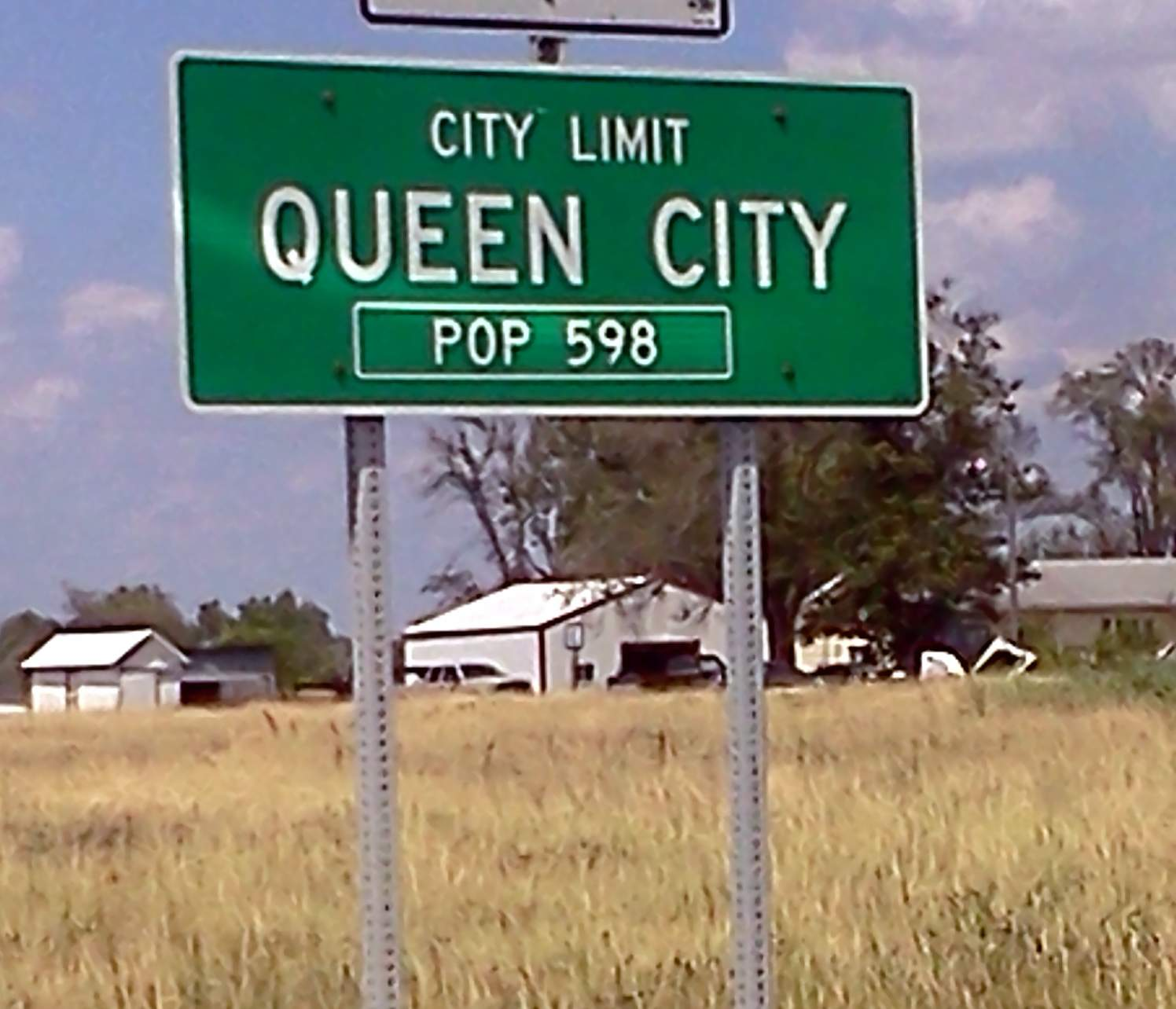
- City limits sign, Queen City, Missouri.

- Location of Queen City, Missouri
- Coordinates: 40°24′45″N 92°33′59″W
- Country: United States
- State: Missouri
- County: Schuyler

Area
  - Total: 1.03 sq mi (2.67 km^{2})
  - Land: 1.03 sq mi (2.67 km^{2})
  - Water: 0 sq mi (0.00 km^{2})
- Elevation: 997 ft (304 m)

Population (2020)
  - Total: 562
  - Density: 546.1/sq mi (210.86/km^{2})
- Time zone: UTC-6 (Central (CST))
  - Summer (DST): UTC-5 (CDT)
- ZIP code: 63561
- Area code: 660
- FIPS code: 29-60356
- GNIS feature ID: 2396298

Queen City is a city in Schuyler County, Missouri, United States. As of the 2020 census, its population was 562. It is part of the Kirksville Micropolitan Statistical Area.

== History ==
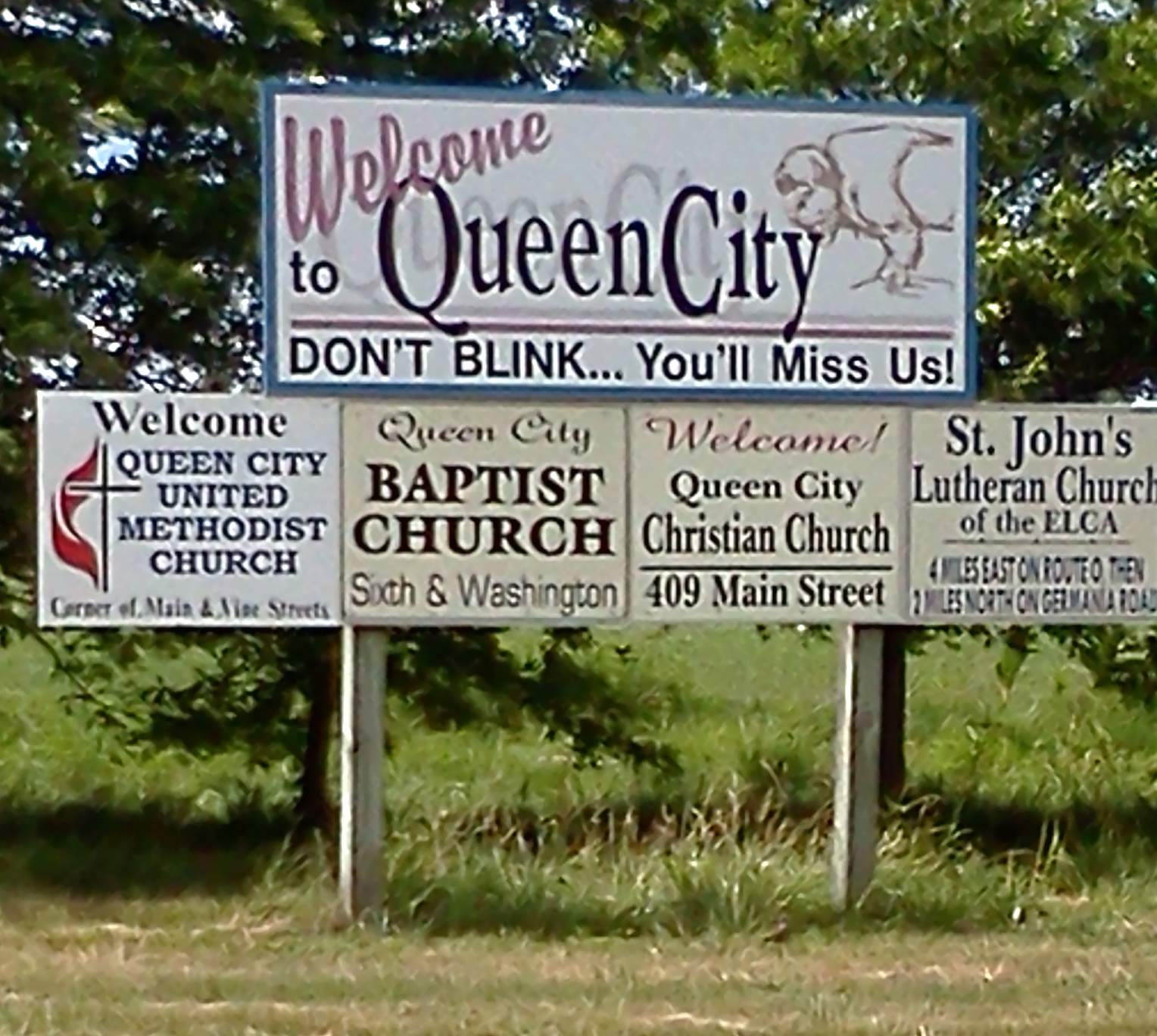
Welcome sign, using humor to point out the town's small size.

Queen City was laid out in May, 1867 by Doctor George W. Wilson and consisted of a town square surrounded by fifteen other blocks. He chose the name in the hope the town would become "the Queen of the prairies." Dr. Wilson also constructed the first home in the new town, while Henry Bartlett is responsible for building the towns's first hotel. By 1888 Queen City offered a considerable business district—five general stores, two grocers, two hardware stores, two hotels, jewelry store, lumber yard, photography gallery, music store, and barber shop were just some of the businesses serving the community and surrounding farms. Being located along the railroad, it provided a fine shipping point for large numbers of railroad ties and other lumber products harvested from heavily wooded areas along the Chariton River several miles to the west. Grain, livestock and some quantities of wool were also shipped by rail from the town. Queen City's first newspaper The Transcript was established in November, 1887 by D.G. Swan.

== Geography ==
According to the United States Census Bureau, the city has a total area of 1.03 square miles (2.67 km^{2}), all land.

== Demographics ==
Historical population
Census	Pop.	Note	%±
1880	357		—
1890	377		5.6%
1900	770		104.2%
1910	701		−9.0%
1920	697		−0.6%
1930	619		−11.2%
1940	646		4.4%
1950	554		−14.2%
1960	599		8.1%
1970	588		−1.8%
1980	783		33.2%
1990	704		−10.1%
2000	638		−9.4%
2010	598		−6.3%
2020	562		−6.0%
U.S. Decennial Census

=== 2010 census ===
As of the census of 2010, there were 598 people, 256 households, and 143 families residing in the city. The population density was 580.6 inhabitants per square mile (224.2/km^{2}). There were 311 housing units at an average density of 301.9 per square mile (116.6/km^{2}). The racial makeup of the city was 99.0% White, 0.5% Native American, and 0.5% from two or more races. Hispanic or Latino of any race were 1.3% of the population.

There were 256 households, of which 26.6% had children under the age of 18 living with them, 43.4% were married couples living together, 8.2% had a female householder with no husband present, 4.3% had a male householder with no wife present, and 44.1% were non-families. 37.9% of all households were made up of individuals, and 18.4% had someone living alone who was 65 years of age or older. The average household size was 2.15 and the average family size was 2.86.

The median age in the city was 45.7 years. 20.9% of residents were under the age of 18; 7.6% were between the ages of 18 and 24; 20.7% were from 25 to 44; 23.9% were from 45 to 64; and 27.1% were 65 years of age or older. The gender makeup of the city was 45.8% male and 54.2% female.

=== 2000 census ===
As of the census of 2000, there were 638 people, 273 households, and 173 families residing in the city. The population density was 621.8 inhabitants per square mile (240.1/km^{2}). There were 321 housing units at an average density of 312.8 per square mile (120.8/km^{2}). The racial makeup of the city was 98.12% White, 0.78% Native American, and 1.10% from two or more races. Hispanic or Latino of any race were 1.41% of the population.

There were 273 households, out of which 26.7% had children under the age of 18 living with them, 47.6% were married couples living together, 12.5% had a female householder with no husband present, and 36.3% were non-families. 33.3% of all households were made up of individuals, and 18.7% had someone living alone who was 65 years of age or older. The average household size was 2.14 and the average family size was 2.66.

In the city the population was spread out, with 20.7% under the age of 18, 6.3% from 18 to 24, 21.3% from 25 to 44, 23.7% from 45 to 64, and 28.1% who were 65 years of age or older. The median age was 46 years. For every 100 females, there were 85.5 males. For every 100 females age 18 and over, there were 78.2 males.

The median income for a household in the city was $20,875, and the median income for a family was $30,703. Males had a median income of $26,250 versus $18,875 for females. The per capita income for the city was $11,928. About 11.3% of families and 16.4% of the population were below the poverty line, including 17.4% of those under age 18 and 25.2% of those age 65 or over.

== Education ==
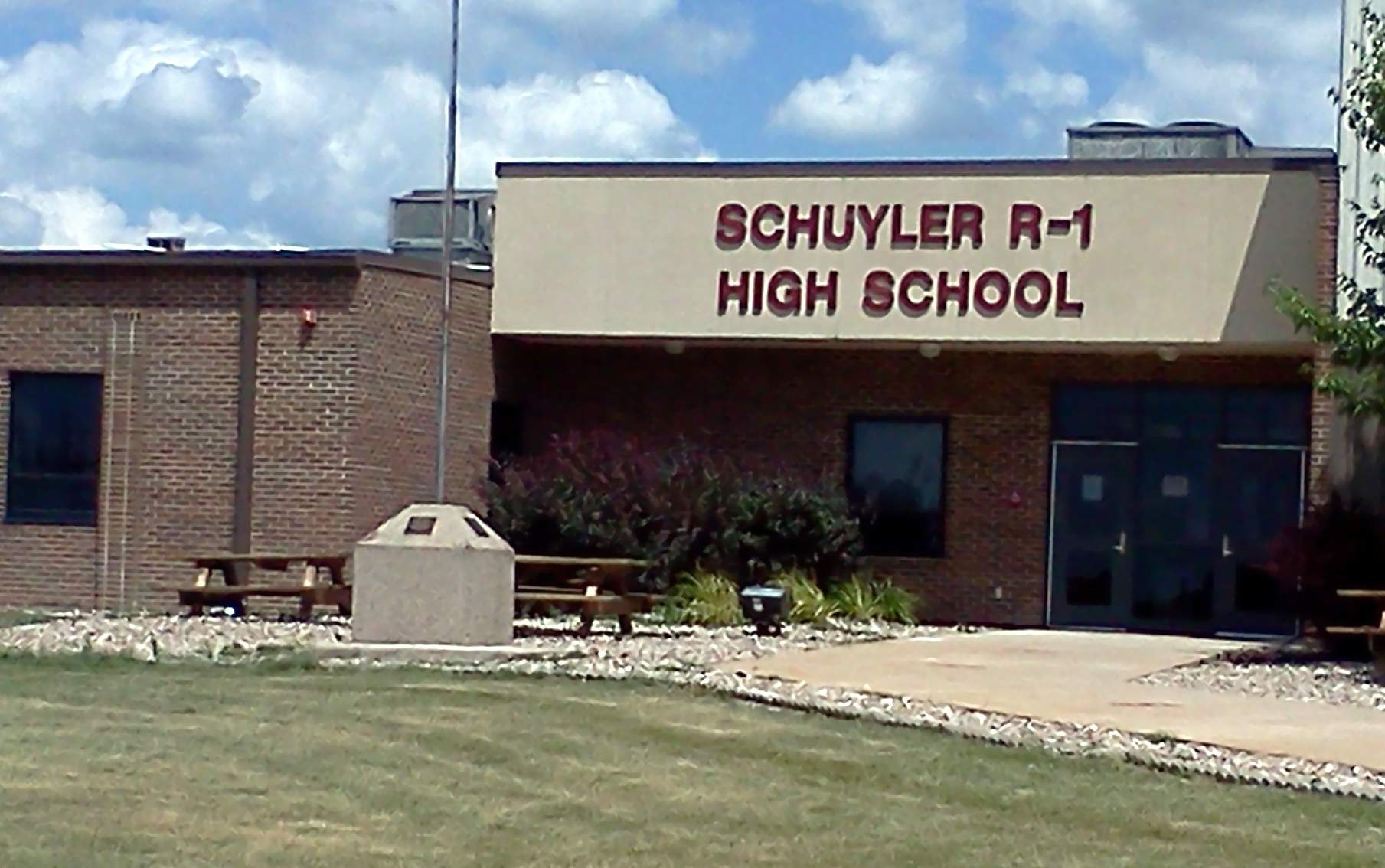
Schuyler County R-1 High School, located in Queen City

It is in the Schuyler County R-I School District.

== Notable people ==
- Farrell Dobbs (1907–1983), Trotskyist, trade unionist and Socialist Workers Party candidate for U.S. President
- Glenn Frank (1887-1940), educator

== Photo gallery ==
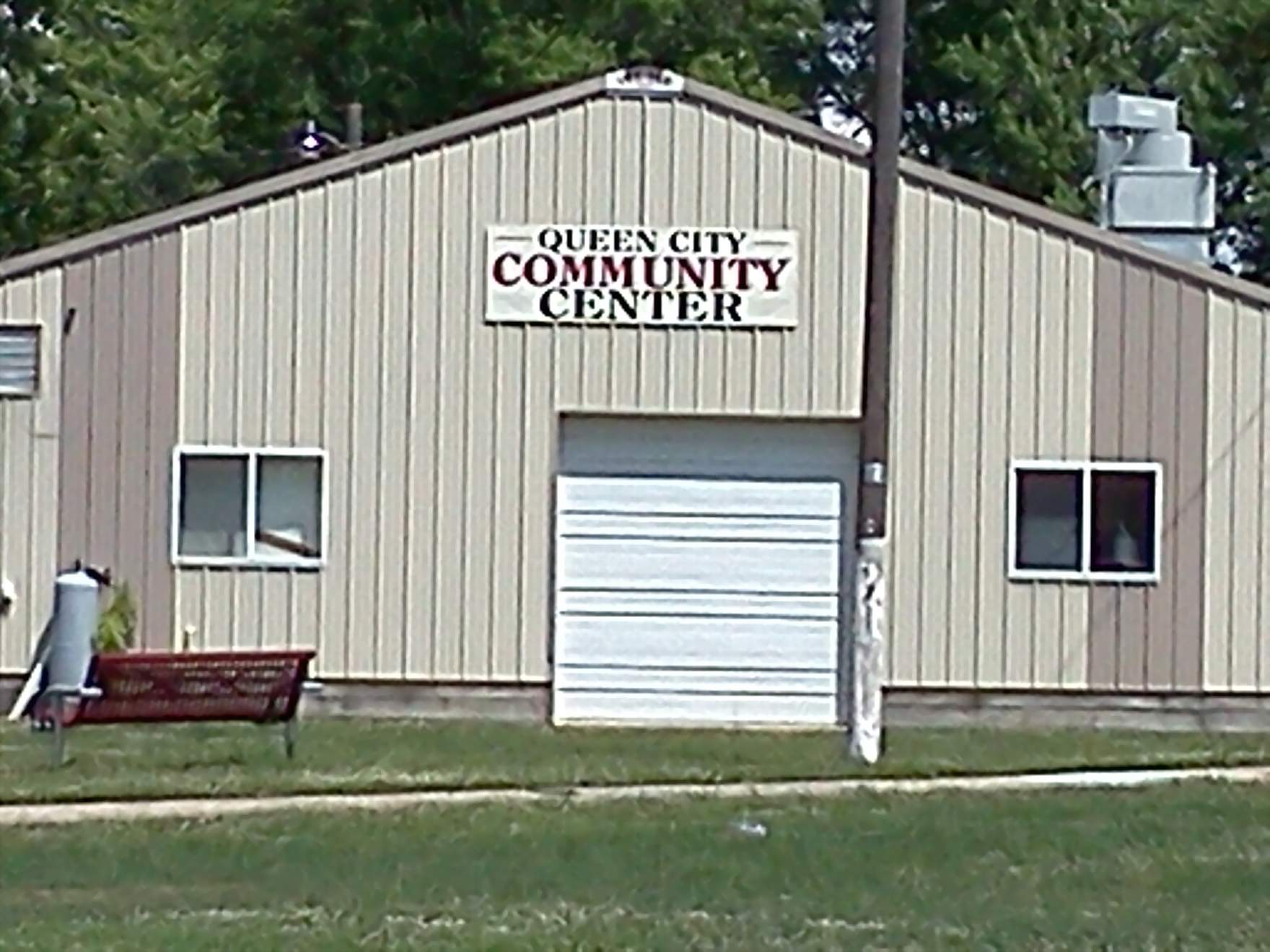
Queen City community building. It especially sees use during the towns annual Pioneer Days celebration.

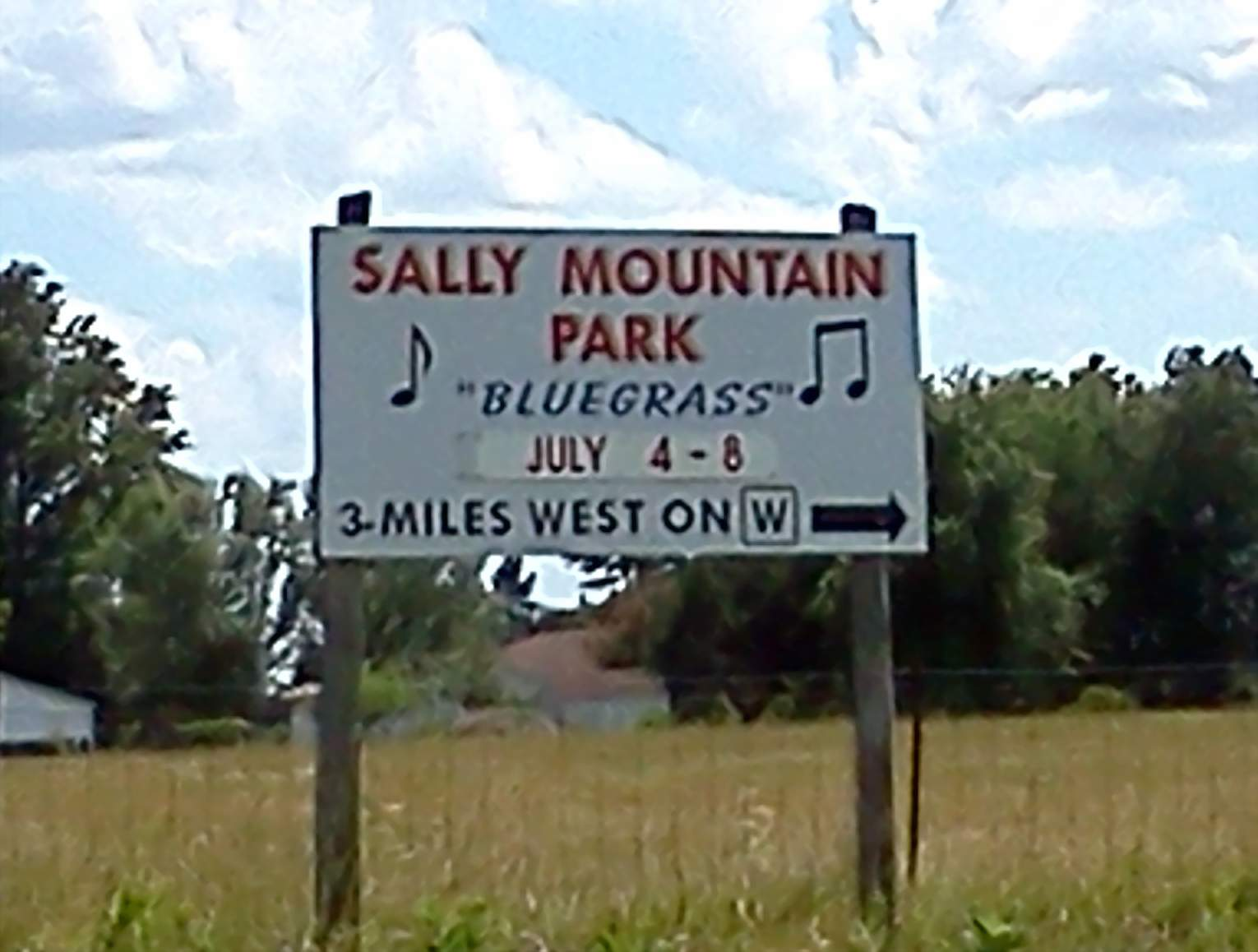
Sign directing attendees to Sally Mountain Park, site of a large Bluegrass music festival hosted annually by Rhonda Vincent and her family.
