= Six Days or Forever? =

1958 book by Ray Ginger on the Scopes Trial

Six Days or Forever? Tennessee v. John Thomas Scopes
- First edition
- Author: Ray Ginger
- Language: English
- Subject: History
- Publisher: Beacon Press
- Publication date: 1958
- Publication place: United States
- Media type: Print (Hardback)
- Pages: 258 pp
- ISBN: 0-19-519784-4

Six Days or Forever? Tennessee v. John Thomas Scopes is a 1958 book about the Scopes Trial by Ray Ginger, first published in hardcover by Beacon Press and later reprinted in paperback by Oxford University Press. Ginger, a New York trade book editor at the time and later, a professor of history at Brandeis, Wayne State University, and the University of Calgary, had written about Eugene Debs and the city of Chicago in the time of John Peter Altgeld before he tackled the Scopes trial. In the conclusion of Six Days or Forever? Ginger wrote that his book had two purposes: First, to get "the facts straight" in order to correct "many mistakes in previous accounts of the episodes," believing that his book "comes much closer than do those accounts to telling what actually occurred." Second, Ginger "tried to view the Scopes trial in the broadest possible context" (242).

Ginger's primary reference sources were the published stenographic transcript and Leslie H. Allen's edited 1925 version, Bryan and Darrow at Dayton: The Record and Documents of the 'Bible Evolution Trial', along with the scrapbook files on the case of the ACLU and Kirtley F. Mather, one of the scientists who went to Dayton to testify on behalf of the Scopes defense. Ginger made use of the available biographies of various participants as well as full-length studies of Fundamentalism and anti-evolution, histories of Tennessee, official records of the Scopes appeal, and books on various scientific and religious topics. Ginger also pointed out that "in the interest of factual accuracy," John T. Scopes had read portions of the manuscript (242–48). Reviews of the book praised Ginger's account of the trial as well as his assessment of the shortcomings of both Clarence Darrow and William Jennings Bryan.
