= Ann Fagan Ginger =

American legal scholar and human rights activist (1925–2025)

- Born: Ann Fagan; July 11, 1925; East Lansing, Michigan, U.S.
- Died: August 20, 2025 (aged 100); Berkeley, California, U.S.
- Education: University of Michigan (BA, LLB); University of California, Berkeley (LLM)
- Known for: Expertise in human rights and peace law
- Spouse(s): Ray Ginger (m. 1944, divorced) James Fenton Wood (divorced)

Ann Fagan Ginger (July 11, 1925 – August 20, 2025) was an American lawyer, teacher, writer and political activist. She founded and served as executive director of the Meiklejohn Civil Liberties Institute in Berkeley, California.

== Background and career ==
Ginger was born in 1925 in East Lansing, Michigan, to radical parents. Her father was from a rural family of English Quaker descent; her mother was urban and of Lithuanian Jewish heritage. Ginger graduated from the University of Michigan Law School in 1947, one of only eight women in her class. She met her first husband, historian Ray Ginger, at Michigan. Ann Ginger practiced labor law in Ohio for a few years, and then moved with her husband to Boston in 1951 when he was hired by the Harvard Business School as a journal editor. Forced to leave Harvard for their refusal to sign non-Communist oaths, the couple moved to New York City. Ann Ginger began working half-time as an administrator for the National Lawyers Guild while raising two children; between 1954 and 1959 she rose to the position of editor of the NLG's professional journal, The Guild Practitioner.

In 1955, Ginger began compiling and publishing the Civil Liberties Docket, a summary and archive of contemporary civil rights and civil liberties litigation materials and decisions, much of which was "not otherwise available." Ginger argued and won a case before the U.S. Supreme Court in 1959, upholding the due process rights of a target of Ohio's state-level Un-American Activities Commission. In 1962, she was the only woman lawyer to attend the first joint meeting of black and white attorneys in the South, co-sponsored in Atlanta by the Guild and the Southern Christian Leadership Conference. There she spoke in favor of the Civil Rights Movement also supporting women's rights.

In 1963, having divorced and moved to Berkeley, California, Ginger hired Boalt Hall law students Michael Tigar and Dennis Roberts to help the Docket keep up with the explosion in school desegregation and other civil rights litigation. In October 1964, while working for the law school's Continuing Legal Education office and studying for an LL.M. degree, Ginger was photographed standing atop a police car in Sproul Plaza on the U.C. Berkeley campus surrounded by student protesters of the Free Speech Movement, giving advice on First Amendment rights. In 1965, she founded the independent nonprofit Meiklejohn Civil Liberties Institute in Berkeley, named for scholar Alexander Meiklejohn. Ginger chaired the City of Berkeley Commission on Peace and Justice from 1986 to 1989 and was vice-chair from 1989 to 1999.

The author of 22 books and many articles, Ginger lectured widely. She served as a visiting professor of law at Hastings University, the University of Santa Clara, and San Francisco State. Ginger's biography of the pioneering left-wing immigration lawyer, Carol Weiss King, was published in 1993. She was an expert in human rights and peace law under the statutes and treaties of the United States and the United Nations. In his own autobiography, Tigar described Ginger as "a superb editor and writer."

In the 1960s, Ginger was married to James Fenton Wood. In the 21st century her life partner was J.R. "Richard" Challacombe. One son predeceased her.

Ginger died in Berkeley on August 20, 2025, at the age of 100.

== Marriage and Harvard controversy ==
From the 1944 until the mid-1950s, Ann Fagan Ginger was married to historian and author Ray Ginger (1924 – 1975). In September 2000, she wrote to the Harvard Board of Overseers demanding an apology for Harvard's 1954 action in forcing her then-husband to resign his position at the Business School for refusing to swear he was not a Communist. Harvard had demanded the same of Ann Ginger, although she was not a university employee. Harvard further demanded that the couple leave Massachusetts as a condition of receiving Ray Ginger's final two weeks' pay. Ann Ginger was then pregnant with their second son. At the time of her 2000 letter, she also made public FBI files that confirmed the Gingers' account of being required to sign a non-Communist oath. This was the first documented proof of Harvard having made such a demand, which Harvard had previously publicly denied.

Harvard replied a few months later, admitting that Ray Ginger had been forced out of the faculty but not apologizing. Board of Overseers President Sharon Gagnon wrote: "I would not presume to ... second-guess the motives or judgments of individuals in that difficult time. It seems clear, however, that Harvard took an action in the case of Mr. Ginger that many thoughtful people today, looking back, would not find appropriate." Ann Ginger found the response insufficient and said Harvard needed a truth and reconciliation commission to make it face what it had done.

Francis Boyle, law professor at the University of Illinois, and a 1976 graduate of Harvard Law School, initiated an unsuccessful campaign to lobby Harvard to conduct a public inquiry, issue a meaningful apology, and endow a chair in the Gingers' name for the study of peace, justice, and human rights.

== Selected works ==
- Bill of Rights Citator 1955-1966 [1967]
- Holdings of Meiklejohn Civil Liberties Institute and ACLU 1920-1966 [1967]
- California Criminal Law Practice [vol. I, 1969]
- The Relevant Lawyers;: Conversations out of court on their clients, their practice, their politics, their life style [1972]
- Human Rights Case Finder, 1953—1969
- The Law, the Supreme Court, and the People's Rights [1977]
- Jury Selection in Civil and Criminal Trials [1984]
- The Cold War Against Labor [1987]
- The National Lawyers Guild: From Roosevelt through Reagan (ed.) [Temple Univ. Press 1988]
- Carol Weiss King: Human Rights Lawyer (1895–1952) [1993] (about mentor Carol Weiss King)
- Nuclear Weapons Are Illegal: The Historic Opinion of the World Court and How It Will Be Enforced [1998] (Summary)
- Human Rights and Peace Law in the U.S. [2003]
- Challenging U.S. Human Rights Violations since 9/11 [2005] (Table of Contents)
- Landmark Cases Left Out Of Your Textbooks (ed.) [2006] (introduction and table of contents)
- The Living Constitution (ed.) [2007]
- Undoing The Bush-Cheney Legacy: A Tool Kit for Congress and Activists (ed.) [2008]
- The U.N. Declaration of Human Rights Is the Law: A Guide to U.D.H.R. Articles in Treaties Ratified by the U.S. (ed.) [2009]
