= Meiklejohn Civil Liberties Institute =

Non-profit organization in California, US

- Type: non-profit organization
- Industry: Peace law
- Founded: 1965, Berkeley, California, U.S.
- Headquarters: Berkeley, California
- Key people: Ann Fagan Ginger, Founder
- Website: www.mclihumanrights.org

The Meiklejohn Civil Liberties Institute (MCLI) is a Berkeley, California-based non-profit think-tank, activism incubator, library and archive. Named for Alexander Meiklejohn, a philosopher, university administrator, and free-speech advocate, MCLI was founded in 1965.

The Meiklejohn Civil Liberties Institute carried on a wide range of activities, including research, publication, advocacy, and education. Its quarterly newsletter was entitled Human Rights Now! The Institute's collection was later made available to the public through the Bancroft Library of the University of California at Berkeley, the University of Michigan's Labadie Collection, and San Francisco State University's Labor Archive.

The founding executive director of MCLI was attorney-scholar-educator-activist Ann Fagan Ginger, who died in 2025 at age 100. In 2018, Steven DeCaprio became Interim Executive Director, serving for about a year.
