= Glenn Frank =

Journalist and president of University of Wisconsin–Madison

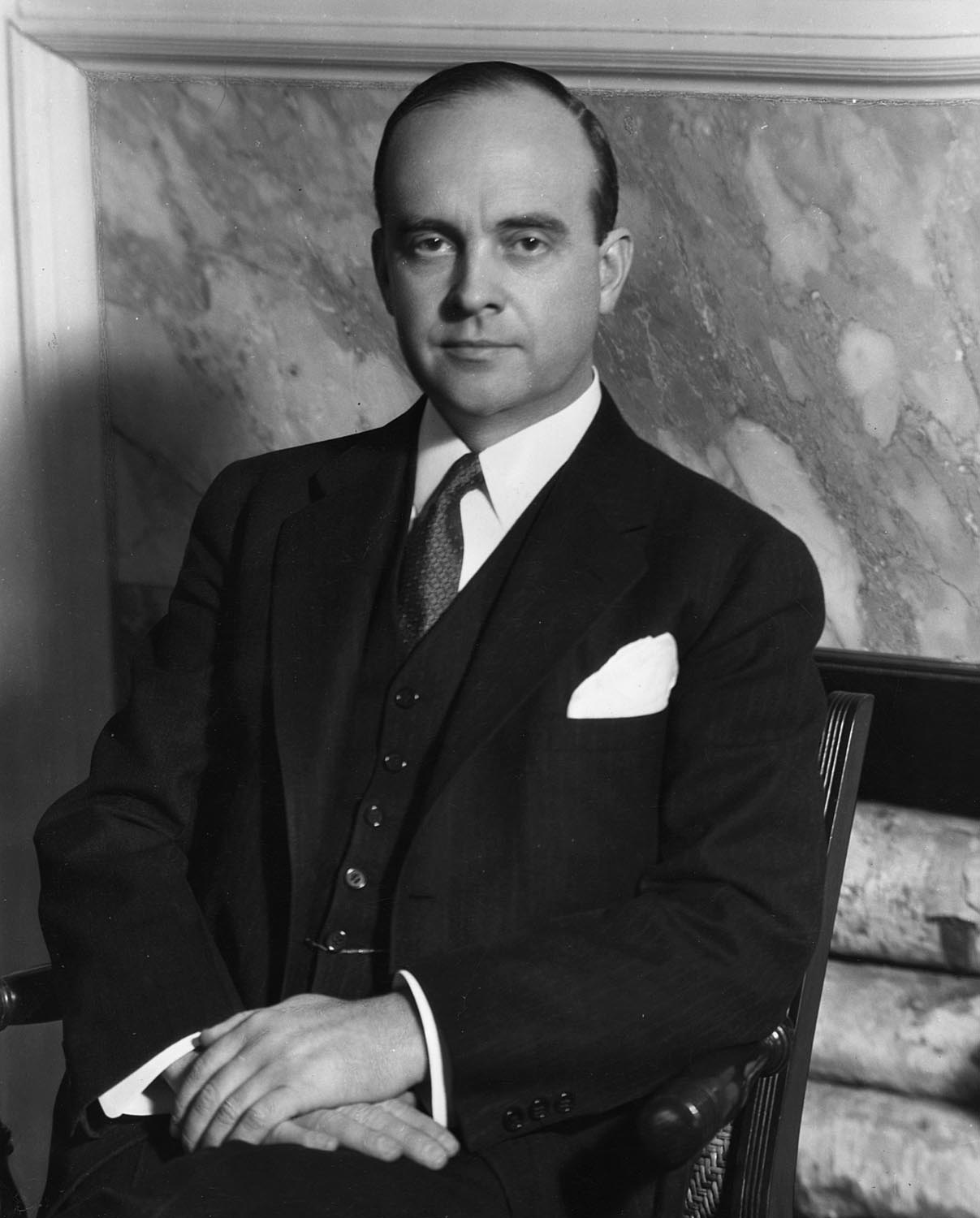
- Frank as president, 1935

President of the University of Wisconsin–Madison
- In office 1925–1937
- Preceded by: Edward Asahel Birge
- Succeeded by: George Sellery (Acting)

Personal details
- Born: October 1, 1887 Queen City, Missouri, United States
- Died: September 15, 1940 (aged 52) Greenleaf, Wisconsin, United States
- Education: Northwestern University

Glenn Frank (October 1, 1887 – September 15, 1940) was a president of the University of Wisconsin–Madison and The Century Magazine's editor-in-chief. He graduated from Northwestern University in 1912 and became Edward Filene's personal assistant, where he wrote two books on the side. He joined The Century Magazine as an associate editor and became its editor-in-chief in three years, which gave his views on education a wide audience. He was tapped to the University of Wisconsin's presidency in 1925, where he introduced the Experimental College before being ousted in 1937. Frank became involved in Wisconsin politics and ran for the state's United States Senate seat, but died with his son in a car accident two days before the Republican Party primary.

== Early life and career ==
Glenn Frank was born on October 1, 1887 in Queen City, Missouri. He joined the Methodist Church when he was 10, and became an evangelical when 12. Passionate for oratory and religion, Frank became a circuit rider and traveled with Billy Sunday for one summer in Iowa as a teenager. He talked his way into classes at Northwestern University in 1909 despite a lack of formal education, though he previously attended Kirksville State Teachers College in Kirksville, Missouri. In college, Frank joined the yearbook and literary magazine (later becoming the latter's editor), acted and debated, and won two oratory contests. He gave speeches in the Evanston area to fund his education, and toured as a Chautauqua teacher in the summers. Walter Dill Scott called him the most brilliant undergraduate mind he had met. Frank earned his bachelor's at Northwestern in 1912 and won senior superlatives for contribution to school community and good looks.

Northwestern President Abram W. Harris offered Frank a new alumni secretary position, which he accepted. He continued to give speeches while on the road for the next three years recruiting at high schools, organizing alumni, and building an endowment. He earned enough money to build a house for his parents in Missouri. He later became Edward Filene's personal assistant. During these years, Frank wrote The Stakes of War (1916) and The Politics of Industry (1917) on the side.

He became an associate editor at The Century Magazine in 1918 and became its editor-in-chief in 1921. He wrote a monthly column on social issues that brought national renown to his thoughts on education reform. In 1925, he became the president of the University of Wisconsin–Madison. One of Frank's columns, "Christianity and Racialism" (1924), strongly criticized both the Ku Klux Klan and the advocacy of "Nordic Race" supremacy popular at the time.

== Madison ==
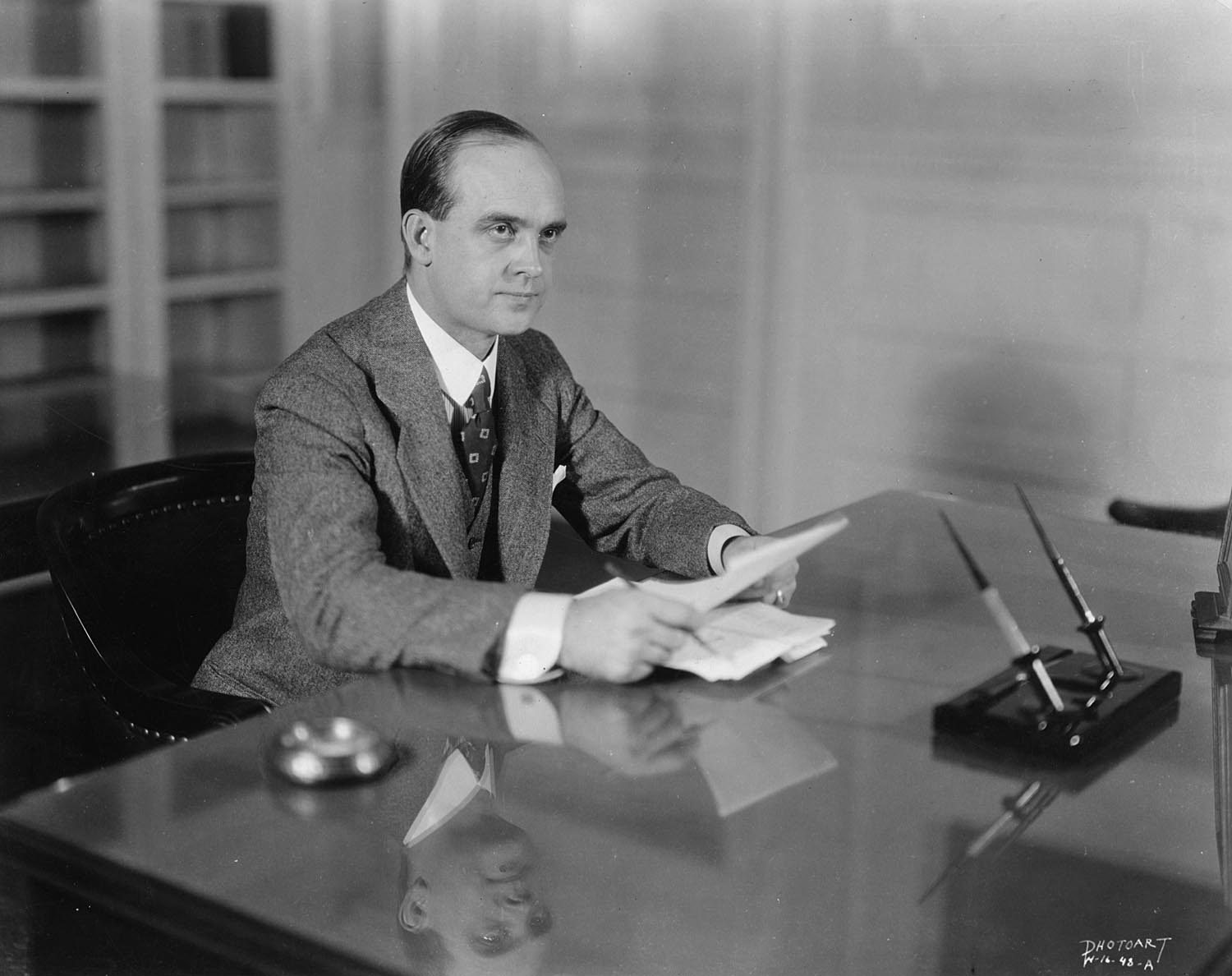
Frank at his desk, c. 1925

Zona Gale, a Regent, was familiar with Frank through her fiction published in Century and asked him in April 1925 about filling the University of Wisconsin–Madison's presidency. Although opposed by the La Follette family, his nomination moved swiftly and on May 20, 1925, he accepted the position to begin in September. He was the youngest president of the university at the time, and unique for not holding an advanced degree.

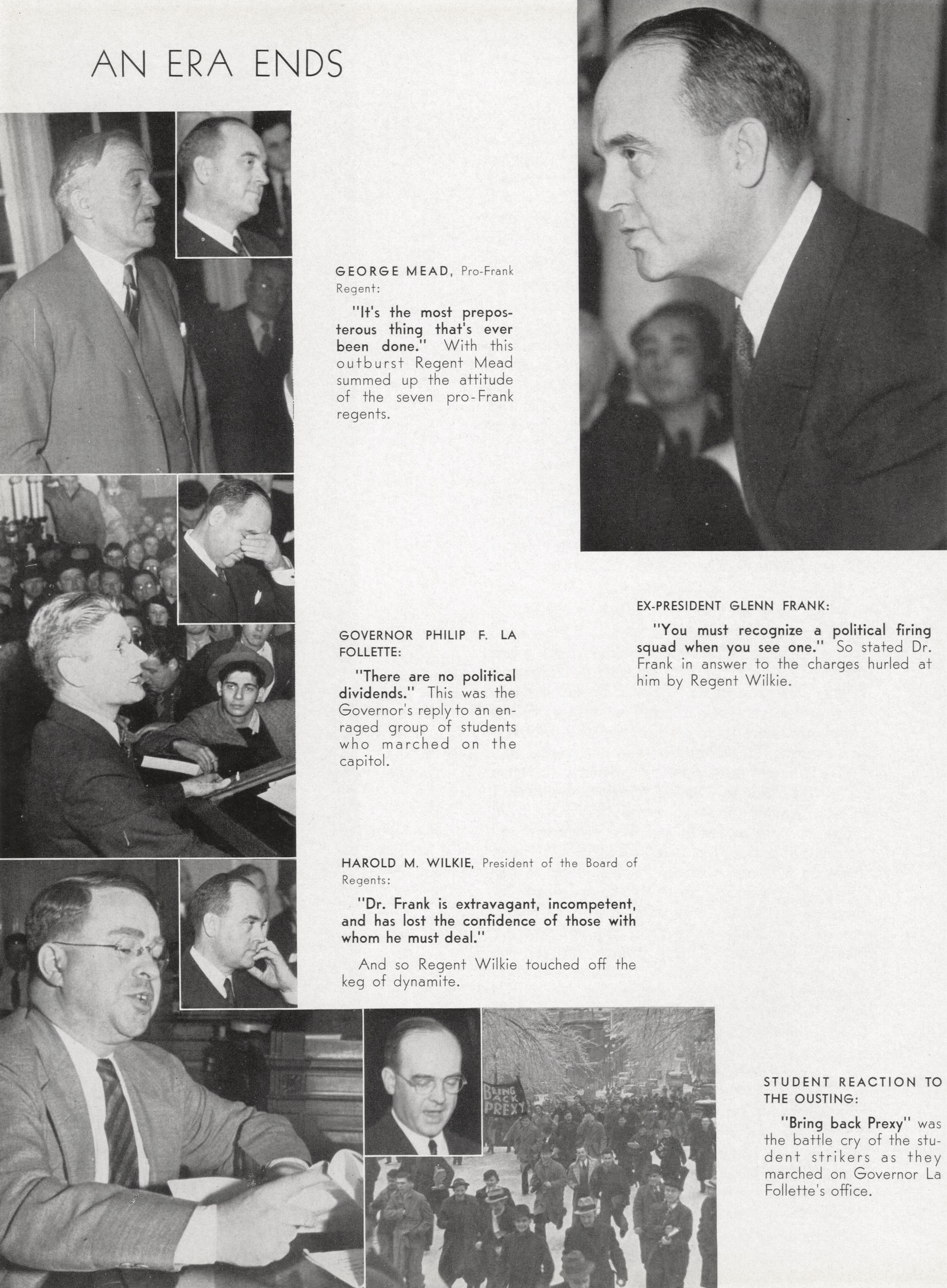
Frank in the University of Wisconsin–Madison, 1937

Frank started the brief Experimental College and expanded the agriculture program. During his time as president, Frank also helped to found the Citizens National Committee for Sacco and Vanzetti, a pressure group that campaigned for a stay of execution for Sacco and Vanzetti. Frank did not enjoy faculty support despite his support of academic freedom and tenure, and his public criticism of Franklin D. Roosevelt put him at odds with the La Follettes in public office. The Board of Regents, mostly appointed by La Follette, requested Frank's resignation in March 1936. Frank declined to resign and the Board held public hearings on his presidential competency before narrowly voting to remove him from office on January 7, 1937.

Upon leaving UW–Madison, Frank joined Wisconsin political causes and began a bid for the Republican nomination for Robert M. La Follette, Jr.'s United States Senate seat.

Frank and his son died in a car accident on September 15, 1940, outside Greenleaf, Wisconsin two days before his Senate primary.

== Legacy ==
Arthur Hove's The University of Wisconsin: A Pictorial History noted of Frank's presidency: the Experimental College's influence despite its short life, the quality of his dean appointments, the staff's productivity, the Farm Short Course's revitalization, and his vindication of free speech.

== See also ==
- List of presidents and chancellors of the University of Wisconsin–Madison

Academic offices
| Preceded by Edward Asahel Birge | President of the University of Wisconsin–Madison; 1925–1937 | Succeeded by George Sellery; Acting |
