= Alexander Meiklejohn =

American philosopher and educator

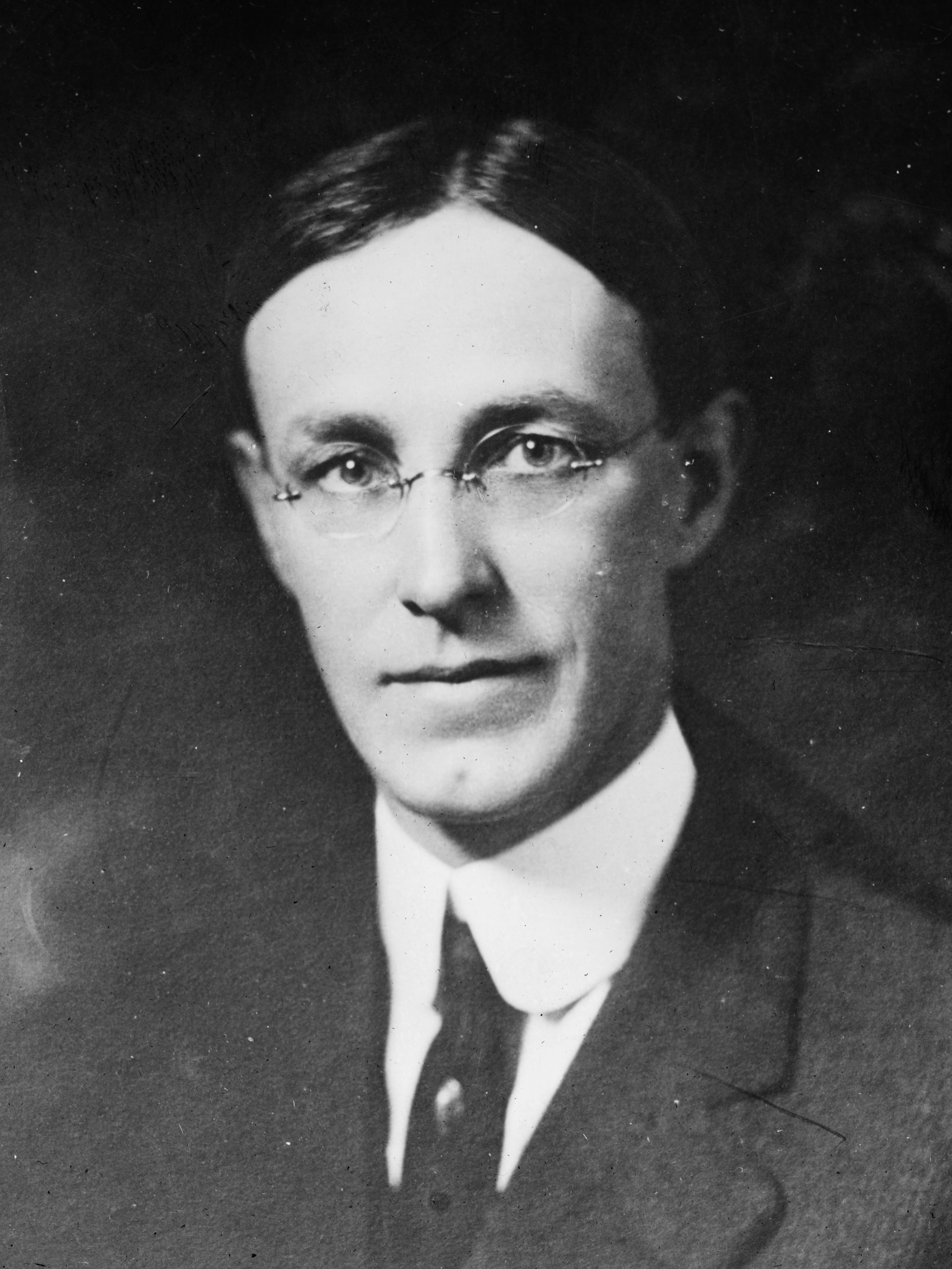
- Meiklejohn sometime before 1912
- Born: 3 February 1872; Rochdale, Lancashire, England
- Died: 17 December 1964 (aged 92); Berkeley, California, U.S.
- Education: Brown University (BA, MA); Cornell University (PhD)

Alexander Meiklejohn (/ˈmiːkəlˌdʒɒn/; 3 February 1872 – 17 December 1964) was an English-born American philosopher, university administrator, educational reformer, and free-speech advocate, best known as president of Amherst College.

== Background ==
Alexander Meiklejohn was born on 3 February 1872, in Newbold Street, Rochdale, Lancashire, England. He was of Scottish descent, and the youngest of eight sons. When he was eight, the family moved to the United States, settling in Rhode Island. Family members pooled their money to send him to school. He earned bachelor's and master's degrees at Brown University, graduating Phi Beta Kappa, and completed his doctorate in philosophy at Cornell in 1897. At Brown, he was a member of Theta Delta Chi.

== Career ==
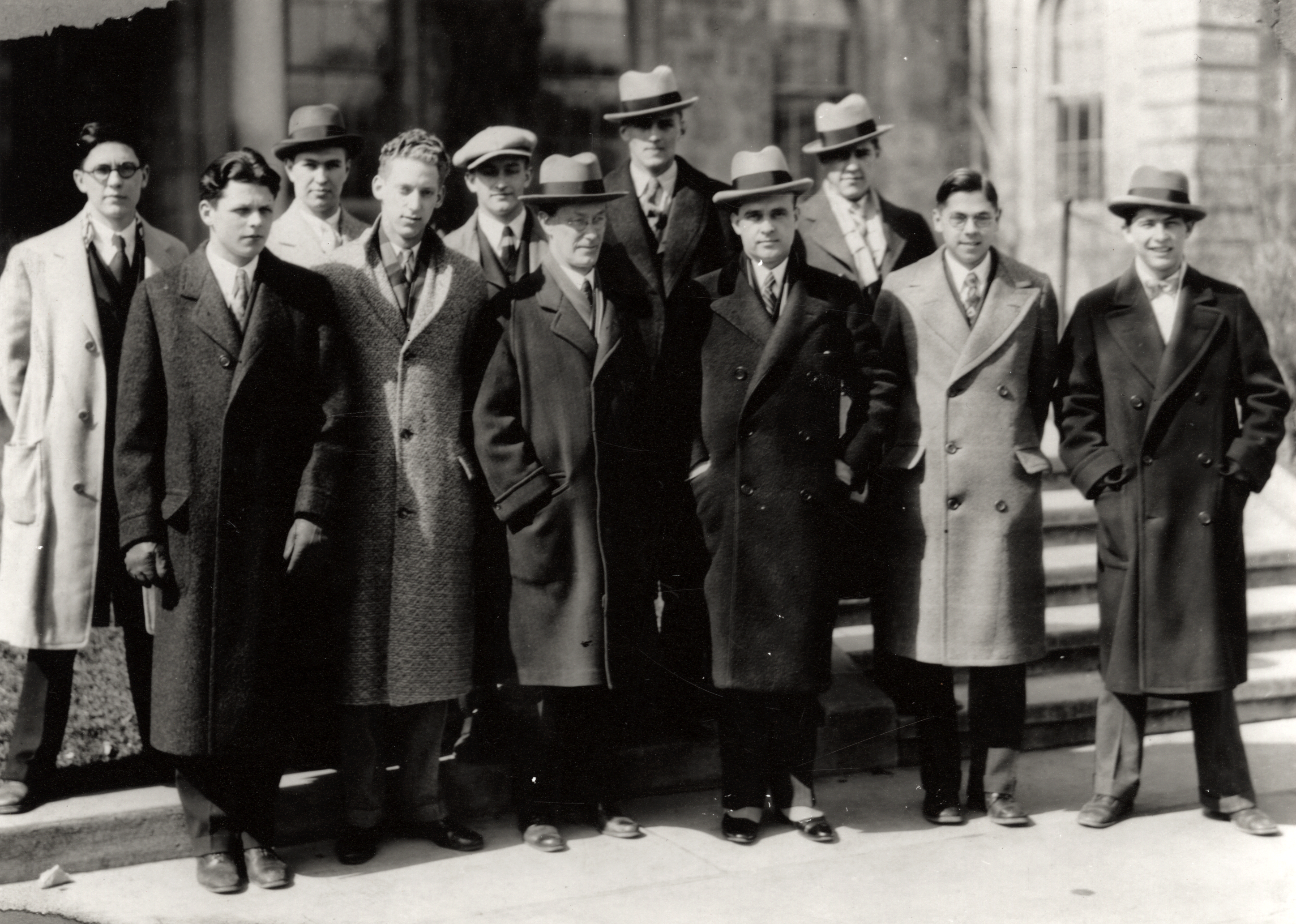
Photo "Experimental College group with Frank and Meiklejohn, 15 March 1928" from Nelson's Education and Democracy as Experimental College advisers (left to right): "Walter Agard, Malcolm Sharp, (unknown), Paul Raushenbush, William Phillips, Alexander Meiklejohn, Carl Bögholt, Glenn Frank, (unknown), Laurence Saunders, Samuel Rogers

In 1897, Meiklejohn began teaching at Brown. In 1901, he became second dean of the university, a position he held for twelve years. The first-year advising program at Brown bears his name. From 1912 to 1923, Meiklejohn served as president of Amherst College. His presidency ended with his forced resignation for trying to apply his reforms, and thirteen students refused their diplomas that year in protest.

Although he was offered the presidency of other colleges, Meiklejohn proposed to open a new, experimental liberal arts college. He was unable to develop adequate funding for creating an entirely new school, but he was invited by Glenn Frank, new president of the University of Wisconsin, to create the University of Wisconsin Experimental College there, which ran from 1927 to 1932. He retired from the University of Wisconsin in 1938, having already moved to Berkeley, California. He was a cofounder of the School of Social Studies in San Francisco, an adult education program focusing on "great books" and American democracy. In 1965, Ann Fagan Ginger, an American attorney and activist, founded an institute to advance human rights and peace law through legal research, education, and advocacy, and named it Meiklejohn Civil Liberties Institute (MCLI), with Meiklejohn's permission. In 1945, Meiklejohn was a U.S. delegate to the founding meeting of UNESCO in London.

== Death ==
Meiklejohn died at age 92 on 17 December 1964, in Berkeley, California.

== Activism ==
Meiklejohn was known as an advocate of First Amendment freedoms and was a member of the National Committee of the American Civil Liberties Union (ACLU). He was a notable proponent of the link between freedom of speech and democracy. He argued that the concept of democracy is that of self-government by the people. For such a system to work an informed electorate is necessary. To be appropriately knowledgeable, there must be no constraints on the free flow of information and ideas. According to Meiklejohn, democracy will not be true to its essential ideal if those in power are able to manipulate the electorate by withholding information and stifling criticism. Meiklejohn acknowledges that the desire to manipulate opinion can stem from the motive of seeking to benefit society. However, he argues, choosing manipulation negates, in its means, the democratic ideal. Eric Barendt has called the defense of free speech on the grounds of democracy "probably the most attractive and certainly the most fashionable free speech theory in modern Western democracies".

Meiklejohn's 1948 article, "Free Speech and Its Relation to Self-Government," was cited by Justice Breyer in a concurring opinion for Nixon v. Shrink Missouri Government PAC, 528 US 377 (2000).

Meiklejohn was a supporter of the Fair Play for Cuba Committee.

== Awards ==
The American Association of University Professors (AAUP) established the Alexander Meiklejohn Freedom Award to honor his work. He received the Rosenberger Medal in 1959. Meiklejohn was selected by John F. Kennedy to receive the Presidential Medal of Freedom, which was presented by Lyndon B. Johnson shortly after Kennedy's death.

== Legacy ==
Meiklejohn has been honored with a number of programs or institution named after him, including the Meiklejohn Civil Liberties Institute (MCLI) in Berkeley. The Meiklejohn Advising Program is Brown University's advising program for incoming first-year students. Meiklejohn Advisors (known as Meiklejohns or Micks for short) are student advisors who are paired with each first-year, along with a faculty advisor, to provide academic advice and help the transition to college. The University of Wisconsin–Madison's Meiklejohn House (home to the Integrated Liberal Studies program) continues to espouse the ideals of Meiklejohn's experimental college by engaging students in interdisciplinary liberal education.

Meiklejohn Hall at the California State University, East Bay, houses many of the school's liberal arts programs. The Evergreen State College in Olympia, Washington, was deeply influenced by Meiklejohn's pedagogical philosophy during its founding and maintains many of his central principles today. Meiklejohn Fellows Program at Amherst College is a unique program reserved for first-generation and/or low-income students. The program provides dedicated advising, programming, peer-to-peer support, and summer internship funding.

== Books ==
Meiklejohn wrote books from 1920 to 1960:

- The Liberal College, 1920
- Freedom and the College, 1923
- The Experimental College, 1932
- What Does America Mean?, 1935
- Education Between Two Worlds, 1942
- Free Speech and Its Relation to Self-Government, 1948
- Political Freedom: the Constitutional Powers of the People, 1960

== See also ==
- Meiklejohnian absolutism
- John William Ward

== Notes ==
Academic offices
Preceded by George Harris	President of Amherst College; 1912–1924	Succeeded by George Daniel Olds
