= College of Letters and Science (University of Wisconsin–Madison) =

Coordinates: 43°04′29.2″N 89°24′11.2″W

The College of Letters and Science is the college of arts and sciences at the University of Wisconsin–Madison. It is located at Madison, Wisconsin.

== About the college ==
The College of Letters and Science enrolls more than half of all students of the university. It provides the foundation courses in science, math, languages, and literature for all undergraduate programs across campus. The college has more than 21,000 students and more than 3,000 faculty and staff.

Letters & Science is the focal point of research in fields such as humanities, social sciences, and natural sciences. The college ranks third among UW–Madison colleges for research grant awards and contributes a significant portion of the grants administered through the Graduate School of UW–Madison. It is also a liberal arts college.

== Departments and academic programs ==
The college is made up of 39 departments and five professional schools that instruct students and carry out research in a wide variety of fields, such as biology, chemistry, economics, history, journalism and mass communication, linguistics, and sociology. The professional schools comprise:

- School of Journalism & Mass Communications
- La Follette School of Public Affairs
- Mead Witter School of Music
- Sandra Rosenbaum School of Social Work

In addition, many centers, programs, and institutes offer courses for academic credit. Within the college, these units are organized under Humanities, Natural Sciences, and Social Sciences Divisions.

Because most freshmen and sophomores take courses in the College of Letters and Science, it is the only college of the UW–Madison that touches every undergraduate student.

== Letters & Science Honors Program ==
The Letters & Science Honors Program serves more than 1,700 students in the college with an enriched undergraduate curriculum. The program also offers professional advising services, grants, scholarships, and awards, and numerous academic, social, and service opportunities through the Honors Student Organization. The Honors Program also supports several student organizations, such as the University of Wisconsin–Madison Forensics Team. The Honors Program was begun in response to a petition by a group of students in 1958 seeking more challenging work for outstanding students.

== Notable alumni and faculty ==
Many distinguished people have studied at the College of Letters and Science. Nobel prize-winning physicist John Hasbrouck Van Vleck completed his A.B. from the college in 1920. Winners of the Nobel Prize, the Pulitzer Prize, and fellows of the National Academy of Sciences have been associated with the college.
