= Orient (disambiguation) =

The Orient is usually a historic term for the Eastern world (as contrasted with the Occident).

Orient or Oriental may also refer to:

== History ==
- Ancient Orient, designation for the Ancient Near East
- Hellenistic Orient, designation for the Hellenistic Near East
- Roman Orient (disambiguation), designation for eastern regions of the Roman Empire, in particular:
  - Diocese of the Orient, an administrative diocese in eastern parts of the Roman Empire
  - Prefecture of the Orient, a praetorian prefecture in eastern parts of the Roman Empire
- Persian Orient, designation for territorial scope of several successive Persian Empires
- Ottoman Orient, designation for regions of the Ottoman Empire in the Near East

== Places ==
- Orient, Queensland, Australia
- L'Orient, Brittany, France
- L'Orient, Switzerland
- Oriental, Puebla, Mexico
- Oriental, Morocco
- Oriente, a former province of Cuba
- Negros Oriental, a province of the Philippines
- Oriental Republic of Uruguay

=== United States ===
- Orient, Illinois
- Orient, Iowa
- Orient, Maine
- Orient, New York
  - Orient Beach State Park
  - Orient Point, New York
- Oriental, North Carolina
- Orient, Ohio
- Orient, Oregon
- Orient, South Dakota
- Orient, Texas
- Orient, Washington
- Orient Heights, a section of East Boston, Massachusetts
  - Orient Heights (MBTA station), a transit station
- Orient Township, Michigan

=== Buildings ===
- The Orient Building, a historic building in Hollywood, California
- Orient Hospital, a former Lebanese hospital
- Orient House, headquarters of the PLO in East Jerusalem in the 1980s and '90s

== Arts and entertainment ==
- Orient (1924 film) (German title: Orient - Die Tochter der Wüste), a German silent film
- Orient (1928 film) (German title: Frauenraub in Marokko), a German silent film
- Orient (novel), a 2015 novel by Christopher Bollen
- Orientalism (book), a 1978 book by Edward W. Said
- Orient (manga), by Shinobu Ohtaka
- Orient: A Hero's Heritage, a computer role-playing game
- Henry Orient, a fictional character in the novel and film The World of Henry Orient
- Oriental (Albéniz), a composition by Isaac Albéniz
- Oriental music (disambiguation)
- Orient (festival), a music festival held in the Baltic countries

== Business ==
=== Airlines ===
- Air Orient, a former French airline
- Filipinas Orient Airways, a former Philippines airline
- Orient Airways (1946–1955), a former airline based in India
- Orient Eagle Airways, a former Kazakh airline
- Orient Thai Airlines, a former Thai airline

=== Banking ===
- China Orient Asset Management
- M Oriental Bank, formerly Oriental Commercial Bank Limited, a commercial bank in Kenya
- OFG Bancorp, or Oriental Bank, a financial holding company in San Juan, Puerto Rico
- Oriental Bank which merged with Consolidated National Bank of New York in 1909 to form National Reserve Bank
- Oriental Bank Corporation, a British imperial bank founded in India in 1842
- Oriental Bank of Commerce, a former Indian public sector bank
- Oriental Bank PLC, or Oriental Bank, a commercial bank founded in Phnom Penh, Cambodia in 2021

=== Shipping ===
- Orient Lines, a cruise line in operation 1993–2008
- Orient Overseas Container Line, a Hong Kong-based container shipping company
- Orient Steam Navigation Company (the "Orient Line"), a former British shipping company

=== Other businesses ===
- Orient Bikes, a Greek bicycle manufacturer
- Orient Insurance, a major insurance company in Dubai, U.A.E. owned by Al-Futtaim Group
- Orient Paper Mills, located in India
- Orient Watch, a Japanese watch company
- Kansas City, Mexico and Orient Railway, a railroad line in West Texas

== Masonic organizations ==
- Grand Orient de France
- Grand Orient of Switzerland
- Grande Oriente do Brasil
- Grand Orient du Congo
- Grand Orient of Belgium
- Grand Orient of Italy
- Grand Orient of Luxembourg
- Grand Orient of the Netherlands

== Ships ==
- Oriental, a sailing ship chartered by the New Zealand Company in 1839
- Oriental (steamship), wrecked on the Outer Banks in 1862
- French ship Orient, several ships
- MV Orient Queen, the name of multiple ships
- Orient (sternwheeler), a steamboat in Oregon in the late 1800s
- Orient, which traded between England and Adelaide from 1857 to 1877

== Sports ==
- Leyton Orient F.C., an English football club, often known just as "Orient"
- FC Lorient, a French football club, known as Lorient

== Schools and universities ==
- School of Oriental and African Studies, aka SOAS University of London, in London, UK
- Oriental College, in Lahore, Punjab, Pakistan
- Oriental University, in Indore, Madhya Pradesh, India

== Newspapers and magazines ==
- L'Orient–Le Jour, a Lebanese newspaper
- The Bowdoin Orient, a student newspaper at Bowdoin College in Brunswick, Maine

== Other uses ==
- Orient (automobile), an early American automobile
- El Oriental (born 1972), Mexican freestyle wrestler
- Oriental (cat) or Oriental Shorthair, a breed of domestic cat
- Oriental tobacco
- Oriental Warehouse in San Francisco, California, US
- Mongoloid or "Oriental", obsolete racial classification

== See also ==
- Orient Express (disambiguation)
- Oriental dragon (disambiguation)
- Oriental Hotel (disambiguation)
- Oriental Institute (disambiguation)
- Oriental Pearl (disambiguation)
- Oriental Theatre (disambiguation)
- The Oriental (disambiguation)
- Oriente (disambiguation)
