= The Oriental =

The Oriental may refer to:

- "The Oriental", a song by Status Quo from their 2002 album Heavy Traffic
- Oriental Hotel (disambiguation)
- Oriental Theatre (disambiguation)

== See also ==
- Orient (disambiguation) which includes entities named "Oriental" without the definite article ("the")
- The Oriental Nightfish, 1978 short film
- Oriental Warehouse in San Francisco, California, US
