= National Register of Historic Places listings in Pamlico County, North Carolina =

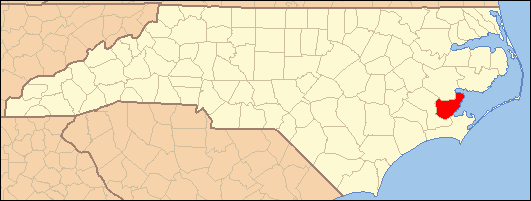

This list includes properties and districts listed on the National Register of Historic Places in Pamlico County, North Carolina. Click the "Map of all coordinates" link to the right to view an online map of all properties and districts with latitude and longitude coordinates in the table below.

This National Park Service list is complete through NPS recent listings posted March 14, 2025.

	Name on the Register	Image	Date listed	Location	City or town	Description
1	China Grove	China Grove	February 6, 1973 (#73001364)	3 miles SW of Oriental on SR 1302; 34°59′46″N 76°44′29″W	Oriental	China Grove is a historic plantation house located near Oriental, North Carolina, built sometime in the late-18th century to early-19th century. It was named for a row of chinaberry trees that once led to its entrance.
2	Holt's Chapel School		August 8, 2023 (#100009232)	136 Janiero Rd. 35°02′12″N 76°45′09″W	Oriental vicinity	

== See also ==
- National Register of Historic Places listings in North Carolina
- List of National Historic Landmarks in North Carolina
