= Orientale =

Orientale may refer to:

- Orientale Province, a former province of the Democratic Republic of the Congo
- Mare Orientale, a major surface feature of the Earth's Moon
- Purosangue Orientale, a breed of horse

== See also ==
- Oriental
- Orient (disambiguation)
