= Orientalist =

Orientalist may refer to:

- A scholar of Oriental studies
- A person or thing relating to the Western intellectual or artistic paradigm known as Orientalism
- The Orientalist, a biography of author Lev Nussimbaum by Tom Reiss
- The Orientalist or The Seeker of Orient, a documentary about Henry Corbin

== See also ==
- Orient (disambiguation)
- Orientalis (disambiguation)
- Occidentalist (disambiguation)
