= Orientalis =

Orientalis, oriental in Latin, may refer to:

- a Yersinia pestis biovar thought to correspond to the third plague pandemic

and also:

- Francia Orientalis, the realm allotted to Louis the German by the 843 Treaty of Verdun
- Marcha Orientalis, the Latin name for the (Bavarian) Eastern March, that became the Margraviate of Austria
- Marcha Orientalis, the Latin name for the Saxon Eastern March
- Opera Orientalis, a military intelligence operation carried out during the Yugoslav Wars in August 1991
- Patrologia Orientalis, an attempt to create a comprehensive collection of the writings by eastern Church Fathers in Syriac, Armenian and Arabic, Coptic, Ge'ez, Georgian, and Slavonic
- Terra orientalis (Osterland), a historical region in Germany situated between the Elbe and Saale rivers to the north of Pleissnerland

== See also ==
- Orient (disambiguation)
- Orientalist (disambiguation)
- List of Roman cognomina
