= SS El Occidente =

Cargo ship for the Morgan Line (launched 1910)

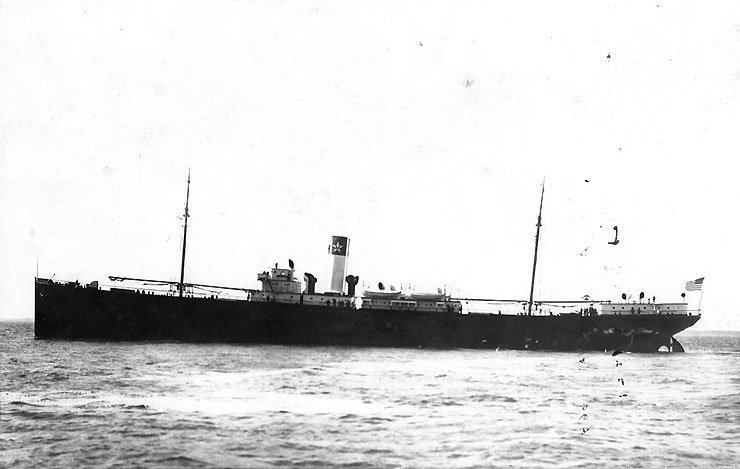
- A port-side view of SS El Occidente as she appeared before World War I

History
- Name: El Occidente
- Owner: Morgan Line
- Builder: Newport News Shipbuilding and Dry Dock Co.; Newport News, Virginia
- Yard number: 133
- Launched: 24 September 1910
- Sponsored by: Mrs. C. W. Jungen
- Completed: 2 December 1910
- Fate: Expropriated for U.S. Army service, 30 May 1917

United States
- Name: USAT El Occidente
- Acquired: 30 May 1917
- Fate: Transferred to U.S. Navy, 27 August 1918

United States
- Name: USS El Occidente
- Acquired: 27 August 1918
- Commissioned: 27 August 1918
- Decommissioned: 18 March 1919
- Identification: Hull number: ID-3307
- Fate: Returned to Morgan Line

History
- Name: El Occidente
- Owner: 1919–1941: Morgan Line; 1941–1942: United States Maritime Commission
- Operator: 1919–1941: Morgan Line; 1941–1942: United States Lines
- Port of registry: 1919–1941: United States; 1941–1942: Panama
- Route: 1919–1941: New York – Galveston
- Fate: Sunk, 13 April 1942

General characteristics
- Type: Cargo ship
- Tonnage: 6,008 GRT
- Length: 430 ft 2 in (131.11 m)
- Beam: 53 ft 1 in (16.18 m)
- Draft: 26 ft (7.9 m)
- Speed: 16 knots (30 km/h)
- Capacity: 800 horses and mules (World War I)
- Complement: 112 (World War I)
- Crew: 41 (World War II)
- Armament: 4 × 4 in (102 mm) guns (World War I)
- Notes: Sister ship of El Sol, El Mundo, El Oriente

SS El Occidente was a cargo ship for the Morgan Line, a subsidiary of the Southern Pacific Company. During World War I, she was known as USAT El Occidente in service with the United States Army and as USS El Occidente (ID-3307) in service with the United States Navy. At the end of war, she reverted to her original name of SS El Occidente.

Built in 1910, El Occidente was one of four sister ships that carried cargo and a limited number of passengers for the Morgan Line. She was acquired by the U.S. Army after the United States entered World War I in April 1917, and converted to carry horses and mules to France. In February 1918, she fought a 20-minute gun battle with two German submarines, destroying the periscope of one. In August 1918, the ship was transferred to the U.S. Navy and continued transporting animals through the end of the war.

El Occidente returned to the Morgan Line in 1919 and sailed with them until June 1941, when the entire Morgan Line fleet was purchased by the United States Maritime Commission. While serving as a civilian-crewed cargo ship during World War II, El Occidente was torpedoed and sunk by the German submarine U-435 on 13 April 1942.

== Early career ==
El Occidente was a cargo and passenger steamship launched on 24 September 1910 by the Newport News Shipbuilding and Dry Dock Co. of Newport News, Virginia (yard no. 133), and delivered to the Atlantic division of the Morgan Line on 2 December 1910. She was the newest of four sister ships; the older three being El Sol, El Mundo, and El Oriente. El Occidente was 6,008 gross register tons (GRT), was 430 feet 2 inches (131.11 m) long by 53 feet 1 inch (16.18 m) abeam, and made 15.5 knots (28.7 km/h). The vessel sailed for the Morgan Line, the brand name of the Southern Pacific Steamship Company (a subsidiary of the Southern Pacific Railroad), which employed her to carry cargo and a limited number of passengers between New York and New Orleans, the eastern terminus of the Southern Pacific line.

In April 1913, The New York Times reported that El Occidente, loaded only with cargo, had rammed a schooner in fog off the New Jersey coast. Responding to a wireless message, the Savannah steamer City of Montgomery came alongside El Occidente to offer assistance, but was refused. The name and fate of the schooner were not reported.

== World War I ==
After the United States declared war on Germany in April 1917, the United States Army, needing transports to get its men and materiel to France, had a select committee of shipping executives pore over registries of American shipping. The committee selected El Occidente and thirteen other American-flagged ships that were sufficiently fast, could carry enough fuel in their bunkers for transatlantic crossings, and, most importantly, were in port or not far at sea. After El Occidente discharged her last load of passengers and cargo, she was officially handed over to the Army on 30 May.

Before any troop transportation could be undertaken, all of the ships had to be hastily refitted. Of the fourteen ships, four, including El Occidente, were designated to carry animals and cargo; the other ten were designated to carry human passengers. The four ships designated to carry animals had to have ramps and stalls built. All the ships had to have gun platforms installed, before each ship docked at the Brooklyn Navy Yard to have the guns themselves installed. (Note: The only exception was for SS Finland, an American Line steamer in transatlantic service to Liverpool. Finland had already been outfitted for guns in early 1917.) All the ships were manned by merchant officers and crews but carried two U.S. Navy officers, Navy gun crews, quartermasters, signalmen, and wireless operators. The senior Navy officer on board would take control if a ship came under attack.

The American convoy carrying the first units of the American Expeditionary Force was broken into four groups; (Note: The individual groups of the first convoy were typically counted as separate convoys in post-war sources. See, for example, Crowell and Wilson, Appendix G, p. 603.) El Occidente was in the fourth group with Montanan, Dakotan, and Edward Luckenbach, and escorts consisting of cruiser St. Louis, U.S. Navy transport Hancock, and destroyers Shaw, Ammen, and Flusser. El Occidente departed with her group on the morning of 17 June for Brest, France, steaming at an 11-knot (20 km/h) pace. A thwarted submarine attack on the first convoy group, and reports of heavy submarine activity off of Brest resulted in a change in the convoy's destination to Saint-Nazaire.

El Occidente departed Saint-Nazaire on 14 July in the company of her convoy mates Dakotan, Montanan, and Edward Luckenbach. Joining the return trip were Army transport Momus, Navy armed collier Cyclops, Navy oiler Kanawha, and cruiser Seattle, the flagship of Rear Admiral Albert Gleaves, the head of the Navy's Cruiser and Transport Force.

Sources do not reveal El Occidente's movements over the next eight months. But in April 1918, the Chicago Daily Tribune reported on an encounter El Occidente had with two German submarines that had occurred on 2 February. In a 20-minute running gun battle, Naval Armed Guardsmen aboard El Occidente exchanged fire with two U-boats, one on the port and one on the starboard. The news item reported that El Occidente's gunners had demolished the periscope of one of her attackers.

El Occidente's next recorded convoy trip took place on 23 March, when she sailed with Navy transports Martha Washington and Powhatan, Army transport ship Finland, and cruiser Pueblo, arriving in France on 4 April. El Occidente next sailed on 18 May with President Grant, Calamares, stores ship Bridge, and Italian steamer Duca degli Abruzzi. Rendezvousing with a contingent of transports from Newport News— Madawaska, Pocahontas, Zeelandia, and Italian steamer Re d'Italia—the convoy was escorted by American cruiser Huntington, and destroyers Little and Kimberly. The convoy arrived in France on 30 May. On 10 July, El Occidente departed Newport News with Navy transports Aeolus, Powhatan, Martha Washington, Matsonia, but had to return to port with a leaky gas injector.

On 27 August 1918, El Occidente was transferred to the Navy and commissioned the same day with Lt. Commander E. S. Campbell, USNRF. El Occidente loaded cargo and 585 horses and mules, and sailed for France on 17 September. Five animals died or were destroyed during the voyage. Offloading her cargo at Saint-Nazaire and Verdun, El Occidente returned to the U.S. on 1 November.

In port when the Armistice with Germany was signed on 11 November, El Occidente loaded 1,467 short tons (1,331 t) of cargo and 800 animals for a second Navy voyage. Departing on 17 November for Verdun, the ship arrived there on 19 December. Returning to Baltimore for repairs and alterations which included the removal of her armament and the stalls for animal cargo, El Occidente sailed again on 15 January 1919 for Bordeaux where she unloaded cargo for the Army of Occupation and embarked 90 passengers for return to the United States. She was decommissioned at New York on 18 March 1919, and delivered to the United States Shipping Board the same day.

== Interwar civilian service ==
Returned by the USSB in March 1919, El Occidente resumed cargo service with the Morgan Line, where she had almost 15 years of routine operation. However, in the 1930s, sailing on a New York – Galveston route, El Occidente was involved in several notable events.

In July 1933, El Occidente had a fire in her No. 1 cargo hold while she was southbound 15 nautical miles (28 km) out from Norfolk, Virginia. El Occidente's initial radio message reported that her crew had the blaze under control, but when that proved not to be the case, she headed in, docked at the Norfolk grain elevator, and requested assistance from local firefighters.

In September 1935, El Occidente came to the aid of the Morgan passenger liner Dixie, which had been driven onto French Reef by the Labor Day Hurricane. Dixie had been headed from New Orleans to New York when she grounded on the reef, located about 60 nautical miles (110 km) south of Miami, Florida and 4.5 nautical miles (8.3 km) off shore. El Occidente, one of 15 ships that responded to Dixie's distress calls, carried two loads of passengers and baggage from Dixie to Miami. There was no loss of life during the grounding or the rescue of Dixie's passengers.

In January 1937, El Occidente issued a distress call while she was in the Gulf of Mexico. After she reported a fire while some 200 nautical miles (370,000 m) south of the mouth of the Mississippi River, U.S. Coast Guard cutters Kimball and Triton and German freighter Leubeck all responded to the call. Before any reached the burning vessel, El Occidente reported that she had gotten the fire under control and needed no further assistance. El Occidente headed to Galveston. The following month, El Occidente issued another distress call, this time for a broken rudder while 80 nautical miles (150 km) off the Virginia Capes. Coast Guard cutter Sebago responded and towed El Occidente to Norfolk, delivering her there on 7 February.

== World War II ==
In June 1941, the United States Maritime Commission (USMC) announced that it had requisitioned the entire Morgan Line fleet of ten ships, including El Occidente and her remaining sister ships, El Oriente and El Mundo. (Note: The fourth sister, El Sol, had been involved in a collision in 1927 and had been scrapped afterwards. See: Colton, Newport News Shipbuilding.) The ships were to finish previously scheduled cargo runs and be handed over to the USMC over the following six weeks. The USMC had been charged with assembling a 2,000,000 GRT U.S. fleet to "aid the democracies" fighting Germany in World War II, and paid $4.7 million for all ten ships and a further $2.6 million for repairs and refits.

El Occidente was handed over to the War Shipping Administration at Galveston on 7 July and assigned to United States Lines, Inc., for operation. The cargo ship was placed under Panamanian registry by U.S. Lines. Little is known of El Occidente's movements over the six months, but on 30 January 1942, she left Boston for Halifax, Nova Scotia loaded with a general cargo. Arriving at Halifax on 1 February, she joined Convoy HX 174 and headed for Liverpool on 7 February, arriving at her destination on 21 February.

Two days later, El Occidente sailed for Reykjavík, where she arrived on 1 March, just in time to depart with Convoy PQ 12 for Murmansk. (Note: Also in Convoy PQ 12 was El Coston, another former Morgan Line ship.) After the convoy arrived at Murmansk on 12 March, El Occidente unloaded her cargo and took on a partial ballast load of chromium ore. She departed in Convoy QP 10 on 10 April. At 01:29 on 13 April, while at position 73°28′N 28°30′E, German submarine U-435 under the command of Siegfried Strelow fired one or two torpedoes which struck El Occidente in the engine room, nearly breaking the vessel in half. El Occidente went down stern first within two minutes, with no time to launch lifeboats. Within 30 minutes of her sinking, HMS Speedwell, one of the convoy's escorts, rescued 21 of the ship's 41-man crew; the remaining 20 crewmen died.

== Bibliography ==
- Crowell, Benedict; Robert Forrest Wilson (1921). The Road to France: The Transportation of Troops and Military Supplies, 1917–1918. How America Went to War: An Account From Official Sources of the Nation's War Activities, 1917–1920. New Haven: Yale University Press. OCLC 18696066.
- Gleaves, Albert (1921). A History of the Transport Service: Adventures and Experiences of United States Transports and Cruisers in the World War. New York: George H. Doran Company. OCLC 976757.
- Helgason, Guðmundur. "Allied Ships hit by U-boats: El Occidente". The U-Boat War 1939–1945. uboat.net.
- Naval Historical Center. "El Occidente". Dictionary of American Naval Fighting Ships. Navy Department, Naval History and Heritage Command.
- Sharpe, Henry Granville (1921). The Quartermaster Corps in the Year 1917 in the World War. New York: Century Co. OCLC 7980339.
