= Asia Cruises =

Cruise line

Asia Cruises (formerly Asia Cruiser Club) is a cruise line operating from Hong Kong. It launched the Captain Omar in 1997, and later acquired various cruise liners including Omar II, Omar III and Asia Star. The company is controlled by entrepreneur Stanley Ho.

== History ==
It was founded in 1997. Beginning in 2003, Asia Cruises obtained embarkation and berthing rights from the Chinese government at eight ports in Tianjin, Shanghai, Xiamen, Dalian, Dandong, Ningbo, Shantou and Haikou. The Asia Star (formerly the Radisson Diamond) was added to the fleet in 2005 at a cost of HK$390 million. As of 2012 no ships were sailing for Asia Cruises, after the sale of the Asia Star.

== Fleet ==
=== Previous Ships ===
- Captain Omar
- Omar II
- Omar III (formerly Sun Viking, Hyundai Pongnae, sold in 2007)
- Asia Star - Sold to a new upcoming cruise line
