= Orient Hotel =

There are multiple notable hotels known as the Orient Hotel. These include:

- Orient Hotel, Brisbane, in Queensland, Australia
- Orient Hotel (Fremantle), in Fremantle, Western Australia
- Orient Hotel, The Rocks, in The Rocks, Sydney, New South Wales, Australia

== See also ==
- Oriental Hotel (disambiguation)
