= Roman Orient =

The term Roman Orient may refer to:

- Diocese of the Orient, an administrative diocese in eastern regions of the Roman Empire
- Prefecture of the Orient, a praetorian prefecture in eastern regions of the Roman Empire
- in general, eastern regions of the Roman Empire

== See also ==
- Orient (disambiguation)
- Roman Africa (disambiguation)
- Roman Europe (disambiguation)
