= Oriente =

Oriente, meaning "east" in the Italian and Spanish languages, may refer to:

- Oriente, São Paulo, a city in the state of São Paulo, Brazil
- Oriente, San Juan, Puerto Rico, a barrio
- Oriente Province, a region of Cuba before 1976
- Oriente (comarca), Asturias, Spain
- Oriente (Ecuador), a region of eastern Ecuador
- Oriente (Lisbon Metro), Portugal, a train station
- Oriente, a defunct baseball team of the Cuban National Series
- Oriente (Venezuela), a former administrative division
- Universidad de Oriente, a Venezuelan university
- SS El Oriente, a cargo ship built in 1910 for the Morgan Line
- El Oriente, an expansion pack for Uncharted Waters Online

== See also ==
- Gare do Oriente, a subway station or train from Lisbon, Portugal
