= Roman Europe =

The term Roman Europe may refer to:

- in general, European regions of the Roman Empire
- in particular, Roman province of Europe, created by emperor Diocletian

== See also ==
- Europe (disambiguation)
- Roman Africa (disambiguation)
- Roman Orient (disambiguation)
