= Occidentalist =

Occidentalist may refer to:

- Supporter of the international auxiliary language Occidental, also called Interlingue
- Someone or something related to Occidentalism

== See also ==
- Orientalist (disambiguation)
