= Pearl of the Orient =

Pearl of the Orient may refer to:

== Places ==
- Pearl of the Orient Seas, the historical sobriquet for the Philippines.
  - Manila, the capital of the Philippines, historically called the "Perla del Oriente" since 1751.
- Shanghai, the most populous city of China.
- Hong Kong, a special administrative region of China.
- Penang, one of the federal states of Malaysia.
- Saigon, the capital of former South Vietnam and also the most populous city of Vietnam.
- Sri Lanka, in South Asia
- Goa, a small coastal state in India.
- Phnom Penh, the capital of Cambodia.

== Other uses ==
- The Pearl of the Orient, 1921 silent film
- Oriental Pearl Tower, a radio and TV tower in Shanghai, China
- Pearl of the Orient Tower, a residential skyscraper located in Manila, Philippines
- "Pearl of the Orient" (song), 1991 song written by Lo Ta-yu
- Glittering Days, or Pearl of the Orient in Chinese, 2006 Hong Kong TV programme
- Pearl of the Orient (Christopher Nicole), series of books by Christopher Nicole
- Pearl of the Orient, a 1970 documentary film produced by Filem Negara Malaysia

== See also ==
- Oriental Pearl (disambiguation)
