= SS El Sol =

American cargo ship built in 1910

Coordinates: 40.683111°N 74.044075°W

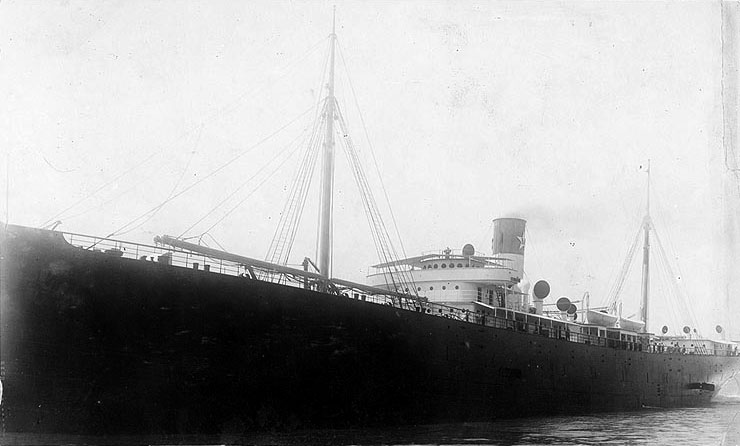
- SS El Sol before 1917

History
- Name: SS El Sol
- Owner: Morgan Line
- Builder: Newport News Shipbuilding and Dry Dock Co.; Newport News, Virginia
- Yard number: 130
- Launched: 11 May 1910
- Sponsored by: Miss Helen Torney
- Completed: 20 August 1910
- Identification: U.S. official number: 207751
- Fate: Expropriated for U.S. Army service

History

United States
- Name: USAT El Sol
- Fate: Transferred to U.S. Navy, 3 August 1918

United States
- Name: USS El Sol (ID-4505)
- Acquired: 3 August 1918
- Commissioned: 3 August 1918
- Decommissioned: 18 September 1919
- Fate: Returned to Morgan Line
- Name: SS El Sol
- Owner: Morgan Line
- Fate: Sunk in collision, 11 March 1927

General characteristics
- Type: Cargo ship
- Tonnage: 6,008 GRT; 6,850 DWT
- Length: 430 ft 1 in (131.09 m)
- Beam: 53 ft 1 in (16.18 m)
- Draft: 26 ft (7.9 m)
- Speed: 16 knots (30 km/h)
- Capacity: 800 horses and mules
- Troops: 1,823
- Complement: 112 (World War I)
- Crew: 45
- Armament: 1 × 4-inch (100 mm) guns (World War I)
- Notes: Sister ship of El Mundo, El Oriente, El Occidente

SS El Sol was a cargo ship built in 1910 for the Morgan Line, a subsidiary of the Southern Pacific Company. During World War I, she was known as USAT El Sol in service with the United States Army and as USS El Sol (ID-4505) in service with the United States Navy. At the war's end, she reverted to her original name of SS El Sol.

SS El Sol was one of four sister ships that carried cargo and limited passengers for the Morgan Line. The U.S. Army acquired her after the United States entered World War I in April 1917, converting her to carry horses and mules to France. In August 1918, the ship was transferred to the U.S. Navy and continued transporting animals through the war's end.

El Sol returned to the Morgan Line in 1919 and sailed with them until March 1927, when she sank in New York Harbor after colliding with Sac City of the American Diamond Lines. A portion of the ship's cargo was salvaged, but the ship was scrapped later in the year.

== Early career ==
SS El Sol was a cargo and passenger steamship launched on 11 May 1910 by the Newport News Shipbuilding and Dry Dock Co. of Newport News, Virginia (yard no. 130), and delivered to the Atlantic division of the Morgan Line on 20 August 1910. She was the first of four sister ships; the other three being El Mundo, El Oriente, and El Occidente. El Sol was 6,008 gross register tons (GRT), was 430 feet 1 inch (131.09 m) long by 53 feet 1 inch (16.18 m) abeam, and made 16 knots (30 km/h). The vessel sailed for the Morgan Line, the brand name of the Southern Pacific Steamship Company (a subsidiary of the Southern Pacific Railroad), which employed her to carry cargo and a limited number of passengers between New York; New Orleans, the eastern terminus of the Southern Pacific line; and Galveston, Texas.

== World War I ==
After the United States declared war on Germany in April 1917, El Sol was requisitioned by the United States Shipping Board (USSB) on behalf of the United States Army, who designated her as an animal transport ship. Although there is no information about the specific conversion of El Sol, for other ships, this typically meant that any second- or third-class passenger accommodations had to be ripped out and replaced with ramps and stalls for the horses and mules carried.

Sources do not reveal all of El Sol's movements, but it is known that she departed on her second trip to France from Newport News on 10 February 1918. Carrying 650 animals, El Sol headed to New York to join in a convoy with fellow Army transport Pastores, and U.S. Navy troop transports Covington, DeKalb, Manchuria, George Washington, President Grant, and Susquehanna. The convoy was escorted by Huntington when it departed from New York on 18 February, and arrived at Saint-Nazaire on 4 March. Ten animals on board El Sol died or were destroyed during the crossing.

The next recorded activity of El Sol was on 3 August, when she was transferred from the Army to the U.S. Navy and commissioned the same day. El Sol was assigned to the Naval Overseas Transportation Service (NOTS) and continued to carry animals and supplies for the U.S. Army.

By August, each animal transport ship had a transport veterinarian and a permanent veterinary detachment to care for the animals on the ship. El Sol had also been joined by two of her sister ships, El Oriente and El Occidente in animal transport duty. She next departed Newport News on 23 August 1918 with 520 horses and mules on board. Upon arrival at Saint-Nazaire on 19 September, El Sol delivered her complete load of animals; none had died during the passage. After returning to the U.S., El Sol departed again on 30 October with another 620 animals on board. Docking in Bordeaux on 13 November—two days after the Armistice—she again delivered her full load of animals.

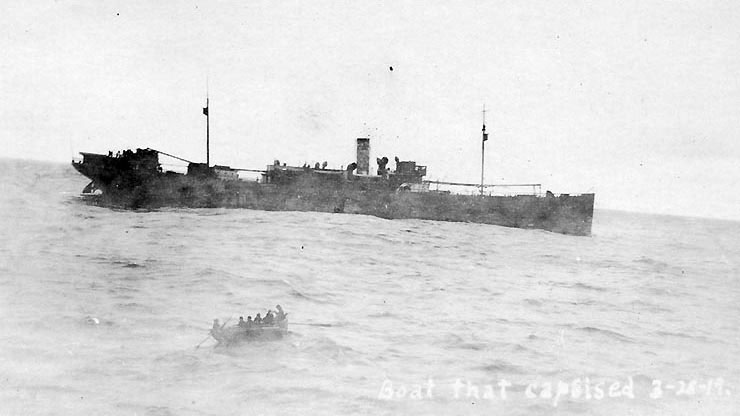
USS El Sol waits for a towline from a launch from USS Scranton. Three men in the launch died when it capsized after this photograph was taken.

El Sol made two more roundtrips for the NOTS over the next five months. While returning to the United States from her last NOTS sailing in late March 1919, El Sol responded to distress calls from Scranton, a Navy troop transport which had a damaged rudder and was disabled. El Sol came to the aid of the stricken ship 900 nautical miles (1,700 km) east of New York to attempt to take her under tow. During the day on 28 March, Scranton attempted to run a towline to El Sol by sending a launch in the rolling seas, but it capsized, killing three men. Ultimately, El Sol stood by Scranton for over 40 hours until minesweeper Penguin arrived and took Scranton under tow.

After her last NOTS voyage on 3 April, El Sol was converted to a troop transport and assigned to the Navy's Cruiser and Transport Force on 15 April. El Sol returned 2,714 healthy and wounded American servicemen from France in two voyages. Decommissioned on 18 September, El Sol was returned to the Morgan Line soon after. (Note: Gleaves (p. 255) reports that El Sol was given to the Ward Line in August 1919, which contradicts the entry in the Dictionary of American Naval Fighting Ships. The ownership information contradicts that recorded in the Miramar Ship Index, a database of historical ship information (See: "El Sol". Miramar Ship Index. R.B.Haworth..))

== Postwar civilian service ==
El Sol resumed cargo service with the Morgan Line, where she had eight years of uneventful operation. On 11 March 1927, however, El Sol was inbound to New York with a $1,000,000 cargo of pig iron, copper, and bales of cotton. When a heavy fog settled over New York Harbor, Captain Charles H. Knowles ordered his ship to anchor until the fog cleared. As El Sol was being maneuvered into position at about 07:45, the American Diamond Line ship Sac City hit a glancing blow to El Sol, bounced off, and then struck El Sol a second time, ripping through El Sol's plating. Sac City's bow had some slight damage, but El Sol sank quickly in about 60 feet (18 m) of water about a half-mile (800 m) south of the Statue of Liberty. Out of El Sol's crew of 45 men, 44 were rescued; the ship's carpenter, who could not swim, was last seen clutching the ship's rail as it went below the surface.

El Sol settled on the bottom at a 45° angle with only the tops of her masts protruding above the surface; the Morgan Line house flag—a blue house flag with a red M inside a white star—still fluttered in the breeze. Even though the sunken vessel was not considered a hazard to navigation, in another fog two days later, a Staten Island Ferryboat nearly hit El Sol's wreck.

In hearings before the United States Steamboat Inspection Service, Captain Knowles of El Sol and the captain of Sac City were cleared of wrongdoing in the collision. The blame was laid on the heavy fog. On 31 July, The New York Times reported on the cargo salvage operations still underway on the wreck of El Sol. In three months of continuous operations, the salvage company reported that about 35% of the sunken ship's cargo had been recovered. The hulk of El Sol was scrapped later in 1927.

== Bibliography ==
- Crowell, Benedict; Robert Forrest Wilson (1921). The Road to France: The Transportation of Troops and Military Supplies, 1917–1918. How America Went to War: An Account From Official Sources of the Nation's War Activities, 1917–1920. New Haven: Yale University Press. OCLC 18696066.
- Gleaves, Albert (1921). A History of the Transport Service: Adventures and Experiences of United States Transports and Cruisers in the World War. New York: George H. Doran Company. OCLC 976757.
- Krenzelok, Greg. "Newport News Animal Transport ship List overseas to France during WW1".
- Naval Historical Center. "El Sol". Dictionary of American Naval Fighting Ships. Navy Department, Naval History and Heritage Command.
