= MV China Star =

Finnish ship

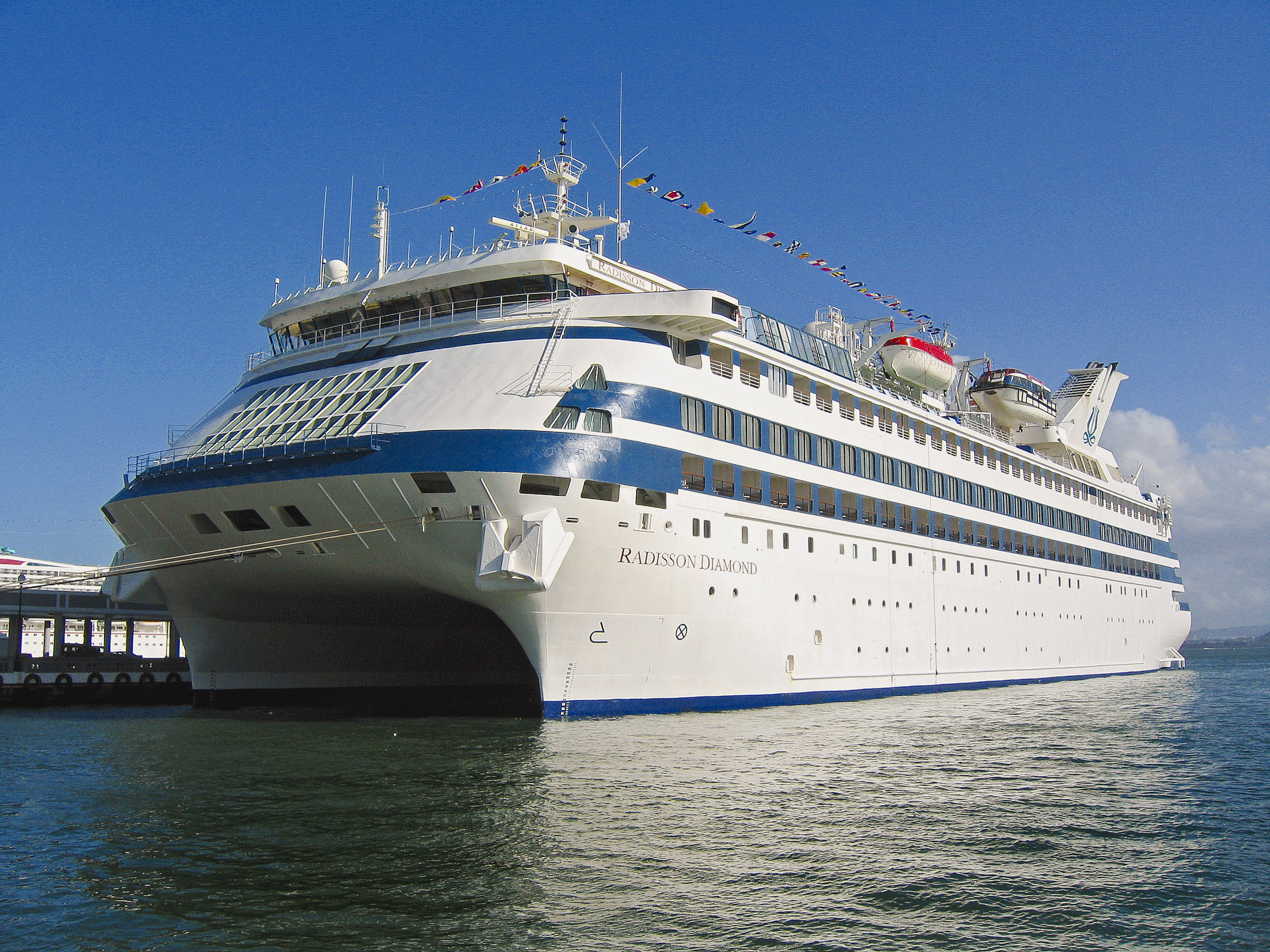
- Radisson Diamond in 2004

History
- Name: Radisson Diamond (1992–2005); Omar Star (2005-2012); China Star (2012–2017); Saipan Star (2017)
- Owner: China Cruises; Conning Shipping (manager)
- Port of registry: 1992-1997: Helsinki, Finland; 1997-2012: Nassau, Bahamas
- Builder: Finnyards (Rauma, Finland)
- Launched: 20 June 1991
- Maiden voyage: 5 July 1992
- Identification: Call sign: C6OP6; IMO number: 9008407; MMSI number: 309788000
- Status: Wrecked on Sandbar near Shandong.

General characteristics
- Type: SWATH cruise ship
- Tonnage: 20,295 GT
- Length: 131.2 metres (430 ft)
- Beam: 31.96 metres (104.9 ft)
- Draught: 7.6 metres (25 ft)
- Decks: 12
- Installed power: Wärtsilä engines
- Speed: 14.15 knots (26.21 km/h; 16.28 mph) or 12.5 knots (23.2 km/h; 14.4 mph)
- Capacity: 354 passengers in 177 cabins or 172 cabins
- Crew: 150 / 200

MV China Star (中华之星) is the world's largest ship with a SWATH design, and the only twin-hull cruise ship ever built.

== History ==
Built as the Radisson Diamond, the ship was built for Diamond Cruise, a conglomerate of several Finnish banks and the UKL-based Carlson Companies (the parent company of Radisson Cruises and Hotels). The ship was built by Finnyards in Rauma, Finland. This 350-passenger all balcony luxury cruise ship was the largest SWATH ship in the world when she was built, measuring more than 20,000 gross tons.

The ship sailed for Radisson Seven Seas Cruises from 1992 to 2005, before being sold to become a gambling ship operator in 2005.

She was sold and has operated in Hong Kong as the gambling ship Asia Star for Asia Cruises beginning in 2005, and the ship was later renamed China Star and was operated by several operators. The ship was laid up in Shenzhen, China on March 5th, 2012

In June 2011, the ship was purchased for $45M by China Cruises Company Limited, the deal being led by Chinese millionaire entrepreneur Huang Weijian, CEO of CCCL. Another $20M was spent refurbishing her. Operation started on March 9, 2012, as the first ship of the new CCCL luxury cruise line.

On September 21, 2022, the Saipan Star was blown aground by severe winds near Shandong. The ship remains abandoned and wrecked on sandbar as of last reported in 2023. N36.845406678937316, E122.20073869376371

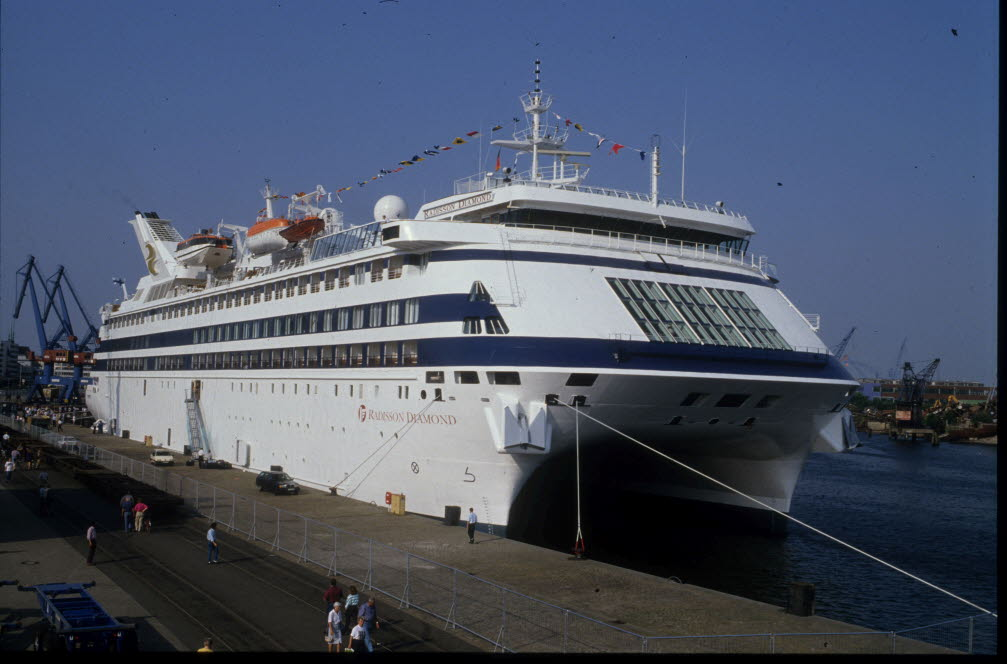
Radisson Diamond in May 1992

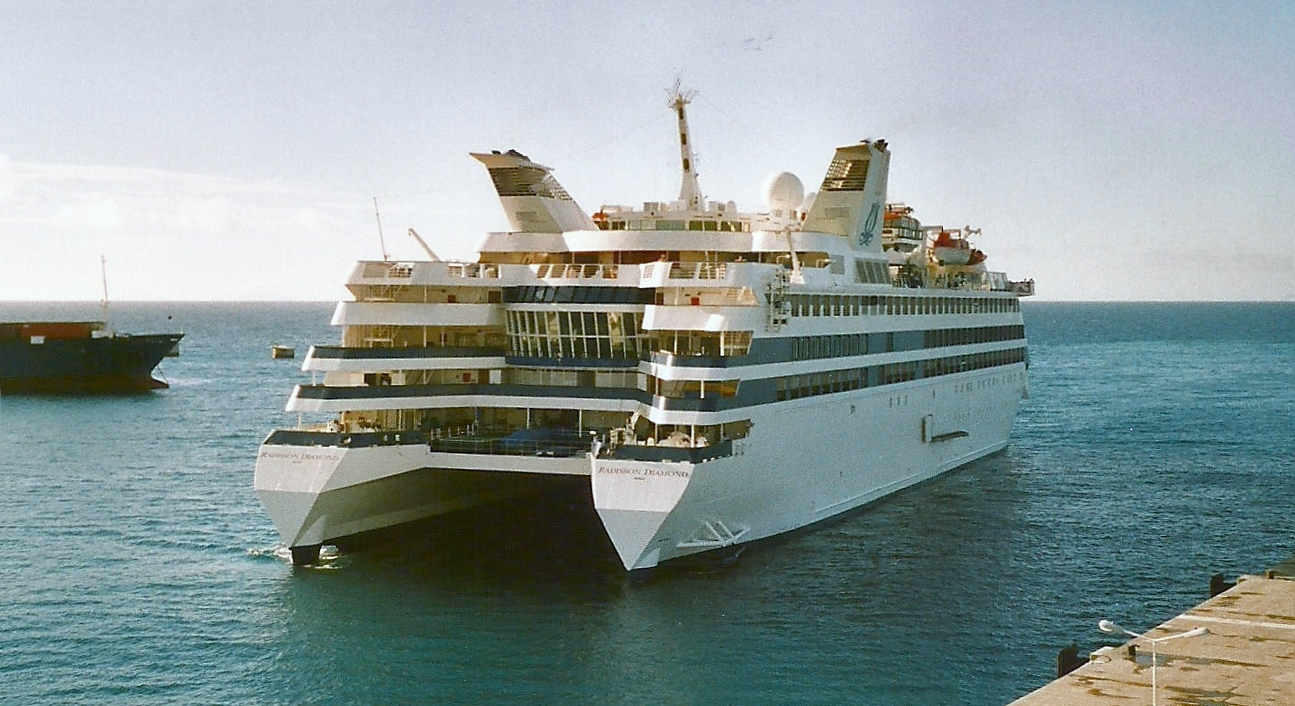
Radisson Diamond in Philipsburg St.Maarten

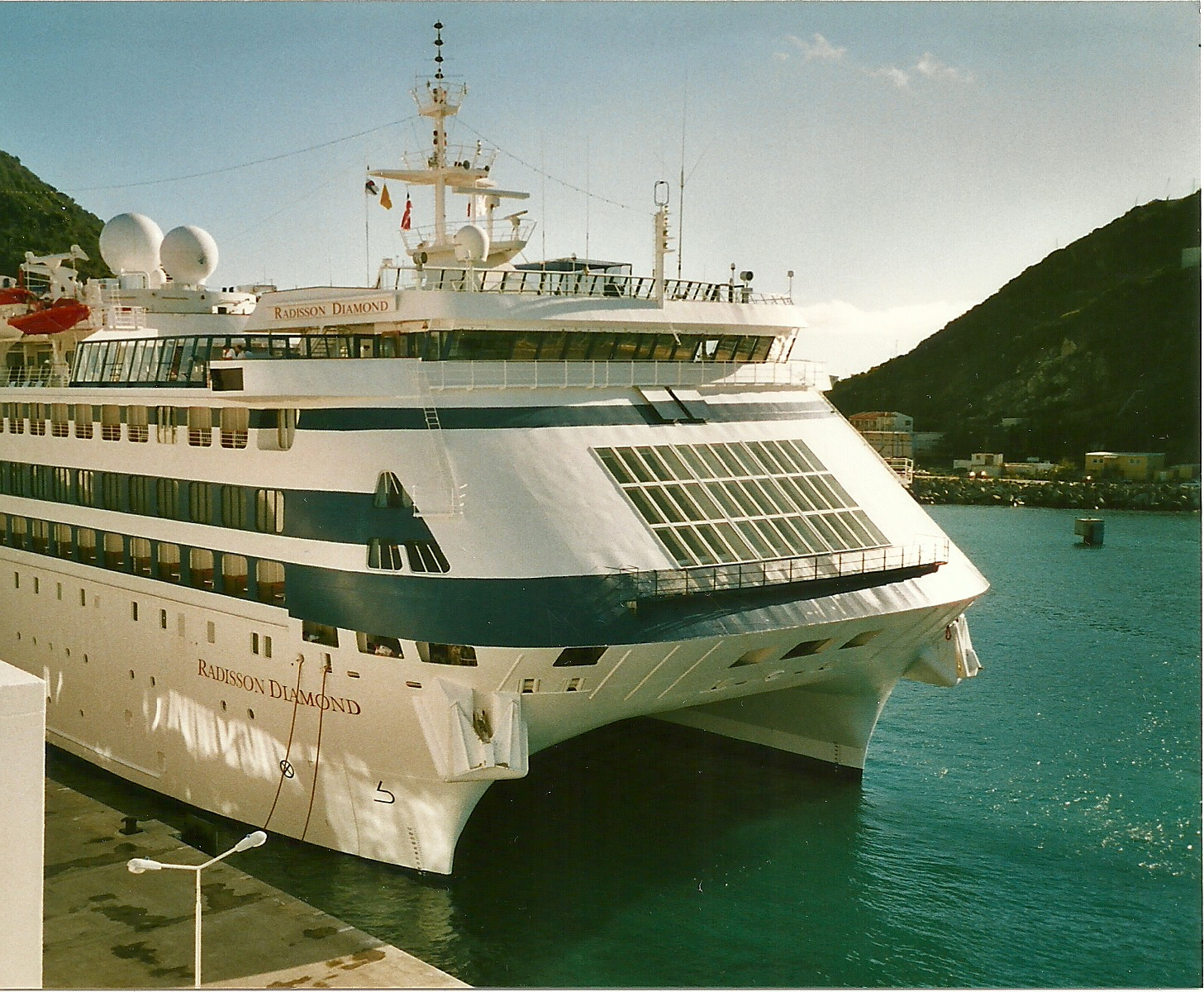
Exterior view of the three deck glass windowed forward observation lounge

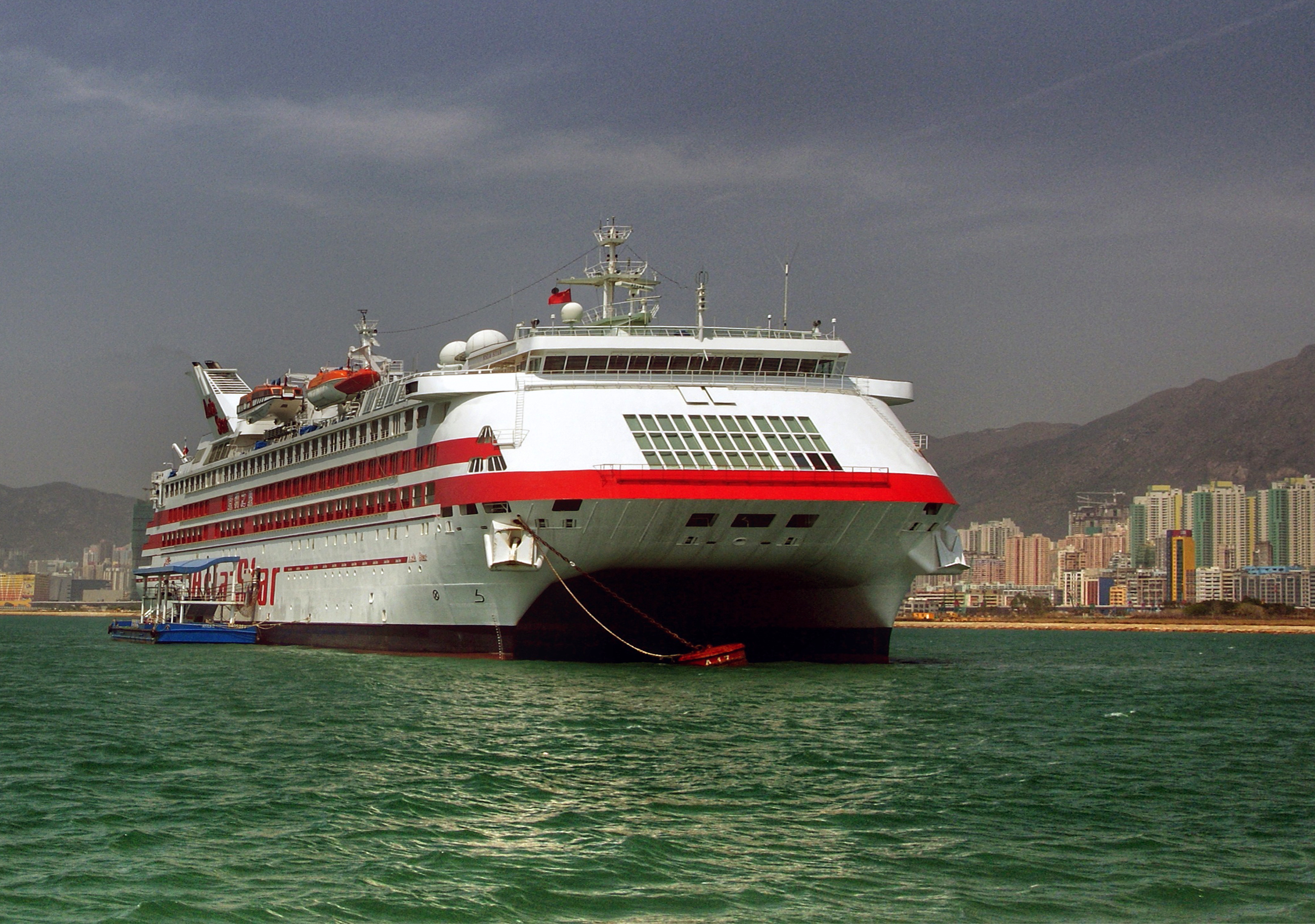
Radisson Diamond renamed China Star in Hong Kong
