= Oriental Dragon =

Oriental dragon may refer to:

- Chinese dragon, a legendary creature in Chinese mythology and folklore
- MV Oriental Dragon, a cruise ship originally ordered by Royal Caribbean Cruise Lines
- Oriental Dragon FC, a football club in Portugal, funded by Chinese investors
