= Orient Queen =

Orient Queen may refer to the following ships:

- MV Orient Queen (so named 2006–2013), launched in 1968 as MS Starward, renamed Aegean Queen, broken up in 2017
- Orient Queen (1989) (so named 2012–2020), launched in 1989 as Vistamar, capsized in 2020
