= MV Sun Viking =

Cruise ship

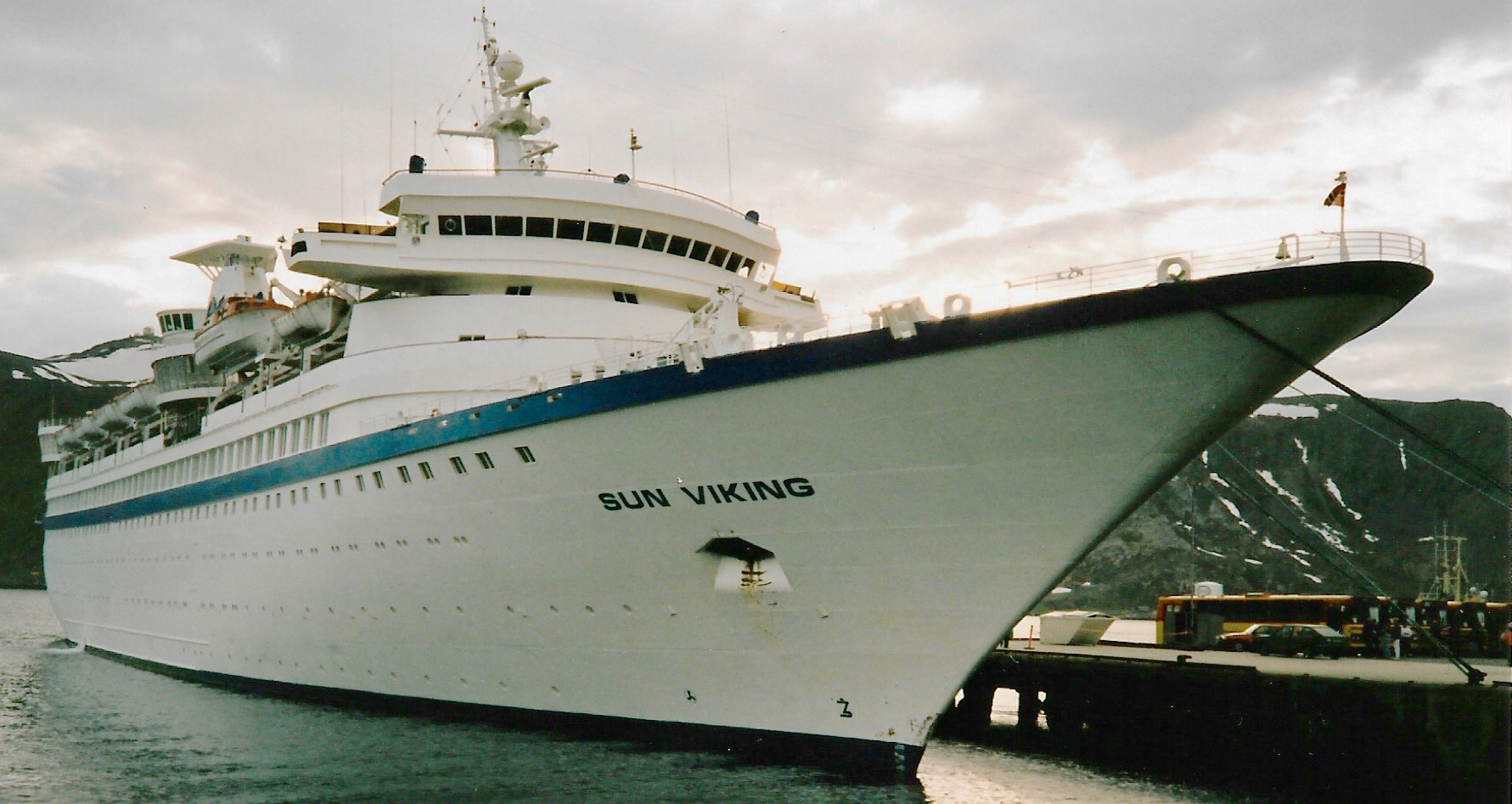
- Sun Viking at Honningsvåg, Norway in 1993.

History
- Name: Sun Viking (1972–1998); Superstar Sagittarius (1998–1998); Hyundai Pongnae (1998–2001); Pongnae (2001–2003); Omar III (2003–2007); Long Jie (2007–2011); Oriental Dragon (2011–2022); Dragon (2022–2022)
- Owner: Capital Dragon Global Holding
- Operator: Island Ship Management, Ltd.
- Port of registry: 1972–1998: Oslo, Norway; 1998–2013: Panama City, Panama
- Builder: Oy Wärtsilä Ab Helsinki Shipyard, Finland
- Yard number: 394
- Laid down: 18 May 1971
- Launched: 27 November 1971
- Completed: 10 November 1972
- Maiden voyage: 1972
- In service: 1972
- Out of service: 2021
- Identification: Call sign: 3FDZ8; IMO number: 7125861; MMSI number: 353669000
- Fate: Scrapped at Gadani, Pakistan in 2022

General characteristics
- Tonnage: 18,455 GT; 3,202 DWT
- Length: 171.69 m (563 ft 3 in)
- Beam: 24 m (78 ft 9 in)
- Speed: 21 knots (39 km/h; 24 mph)
- Capacity: 882 (lower berths)
- Crew: 350

MV Sun Viking, was one of the three original cruise ships ordered by Royal Caribbean Cruise Lines as part of its early fleet. The ship was first put into service in 1972. She was scrapped at Gadani Ship Breaking Yard, Pakistan in February 2022.

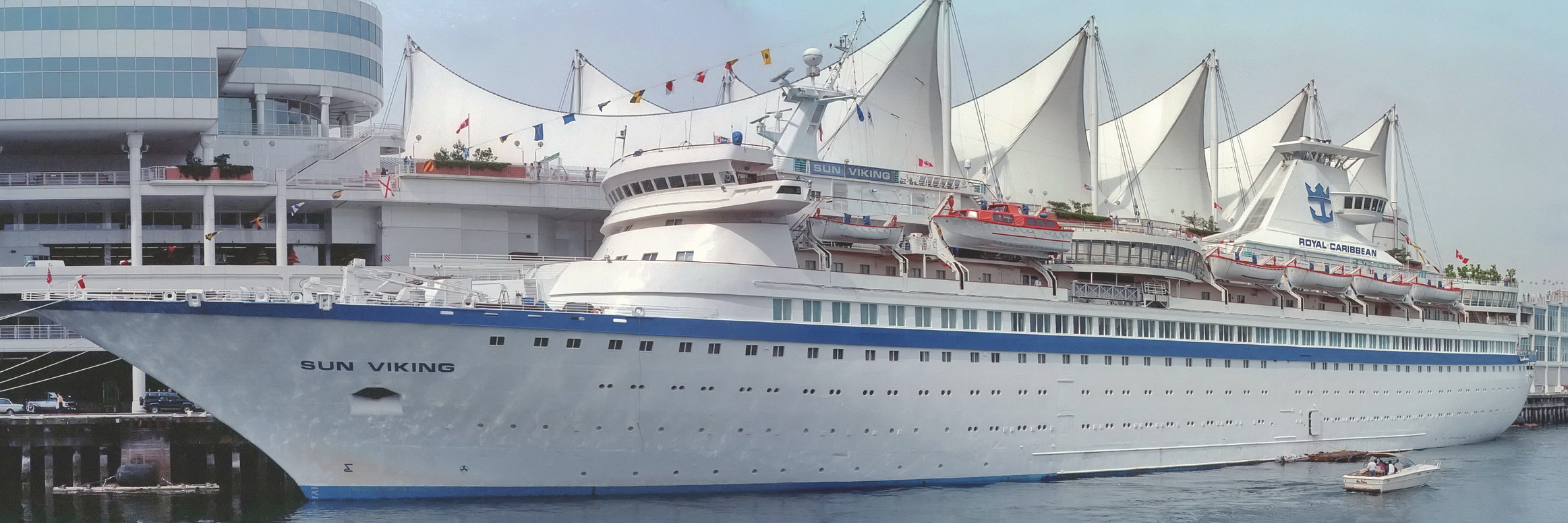
Sun Viking at Vancouver in 1990

Along with her sister ships, Song of Norway and Nordic Prince, the class comprised the first purpose-built ships intended for Caribbean-based cruise travel. Sun Viking cruised the Mexican Riviera on a 7-day itinerary out of Los Angeles and the Caribbean out of San Juan, Puerto Rico in the early 1990s. The ship was retired in the late 1990s by Royal Caribbean, but continued in service with other cruise lines.

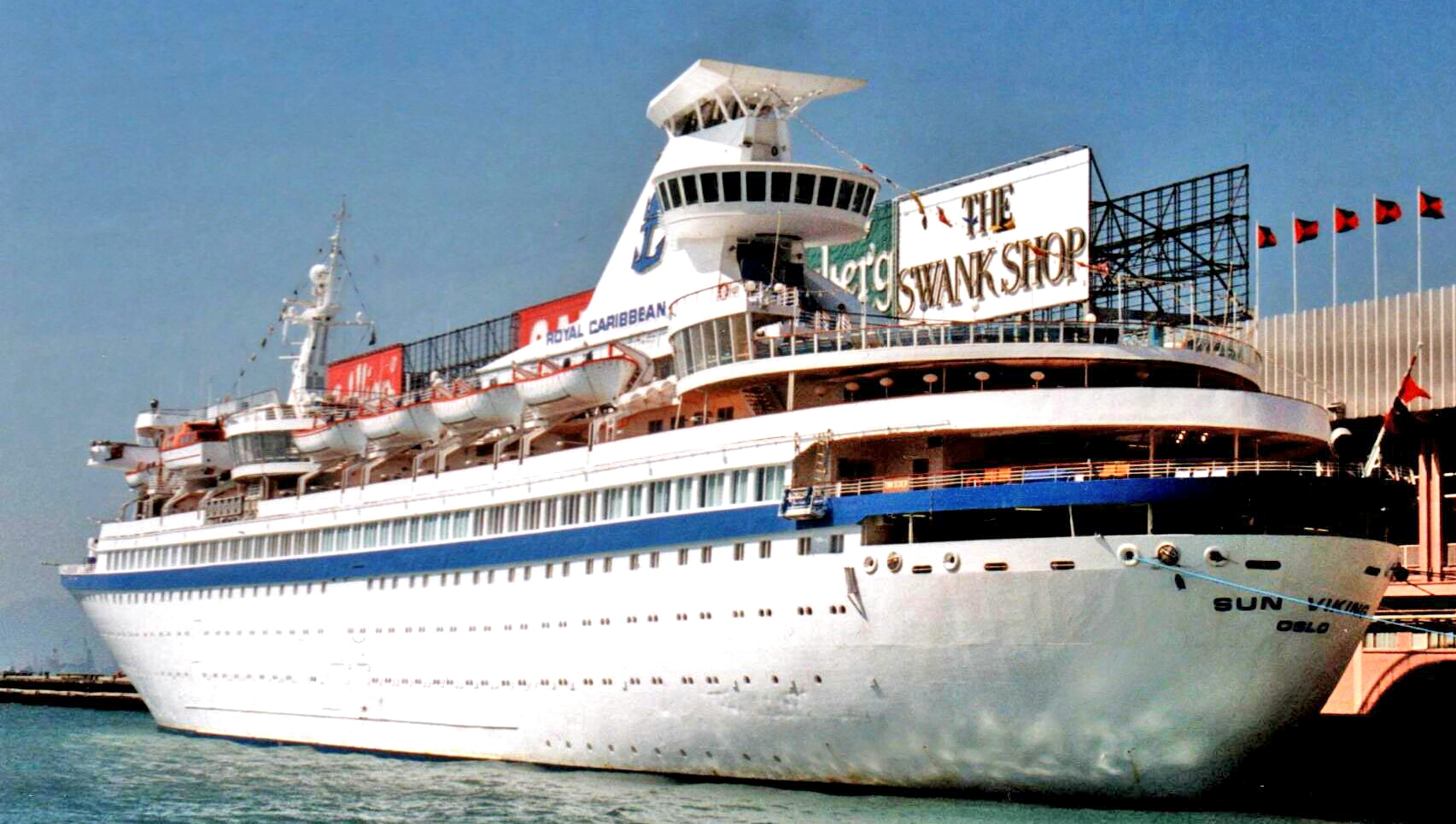
Sun Viking at Hong Kong

In 1998 Sun Viking was sold to Star Cruises and renamed SuperStar Sagittarius. She was later renamed Hyundai Pongnae in 2003, sailing for Hyundai Merchant Marine, before becoming Omar III with Asia Cruises.

The ship was renamed Long Jie in 2007. She was put up for sale on 10 June 2010. After being dry docked in Singapore, Long Jie was transformed into Oriental Dragon, leaving Singapore on 24 March 2011 bound for Guangzhou, China.

After several years of service as a gambling ship in Hong Kong, she moved to Penang, Malaysia in late 2019 to continue her career. In 2021, the ship was finally retired, and scrapped at Gadani Ship Breaking Yard, Pakistan in February 2022 as Dragon.

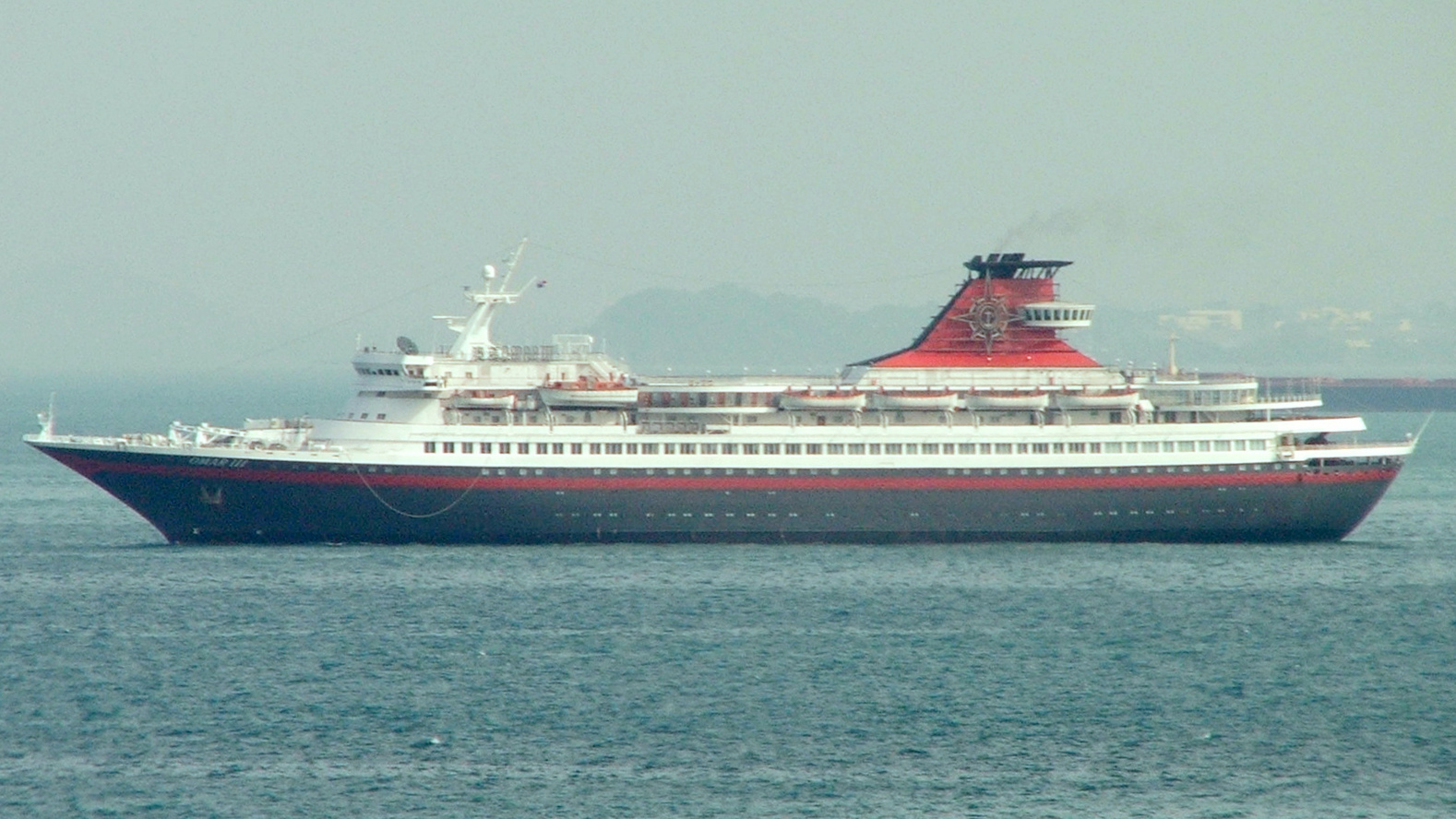
Omar III

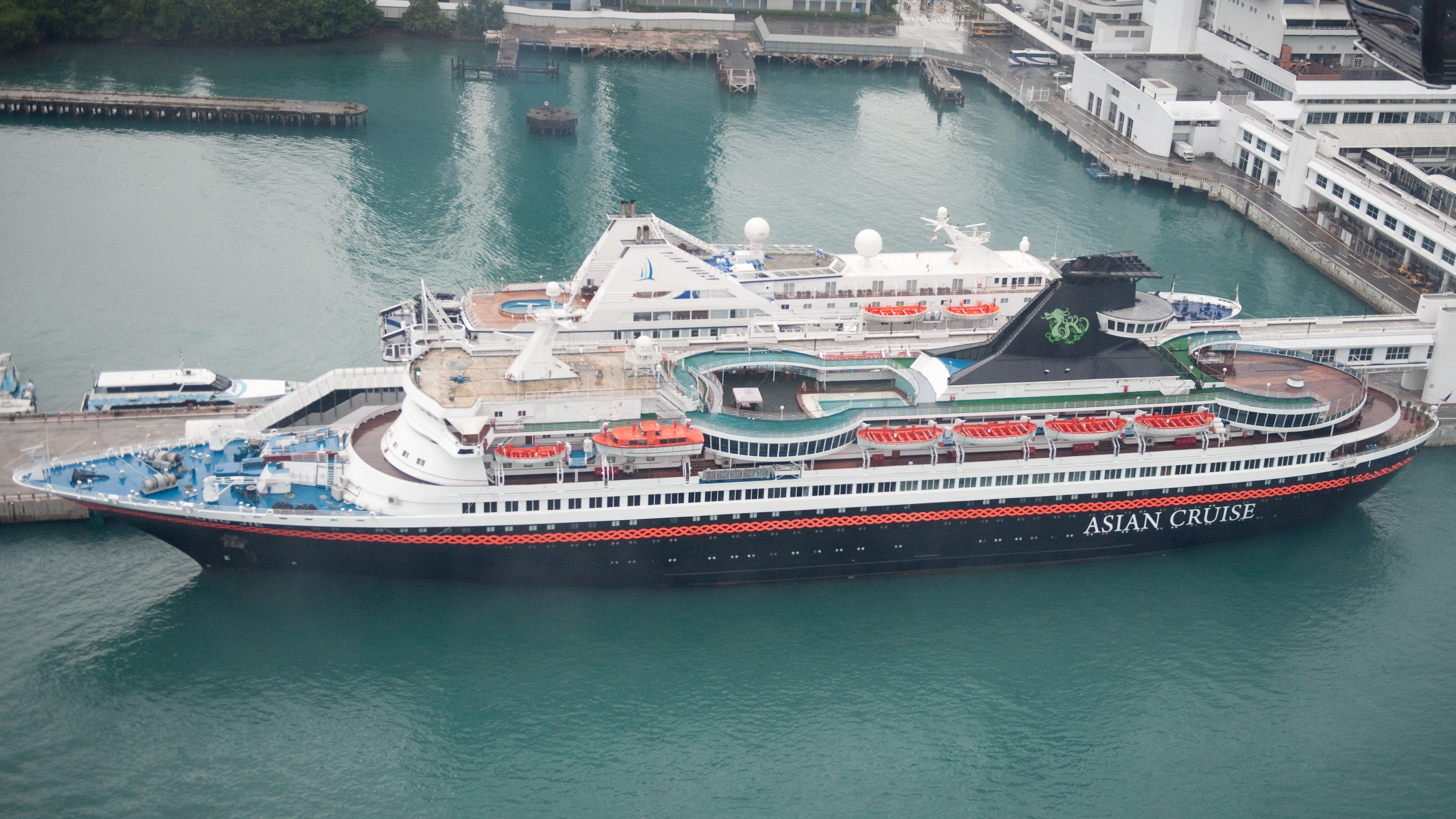
Long Jie

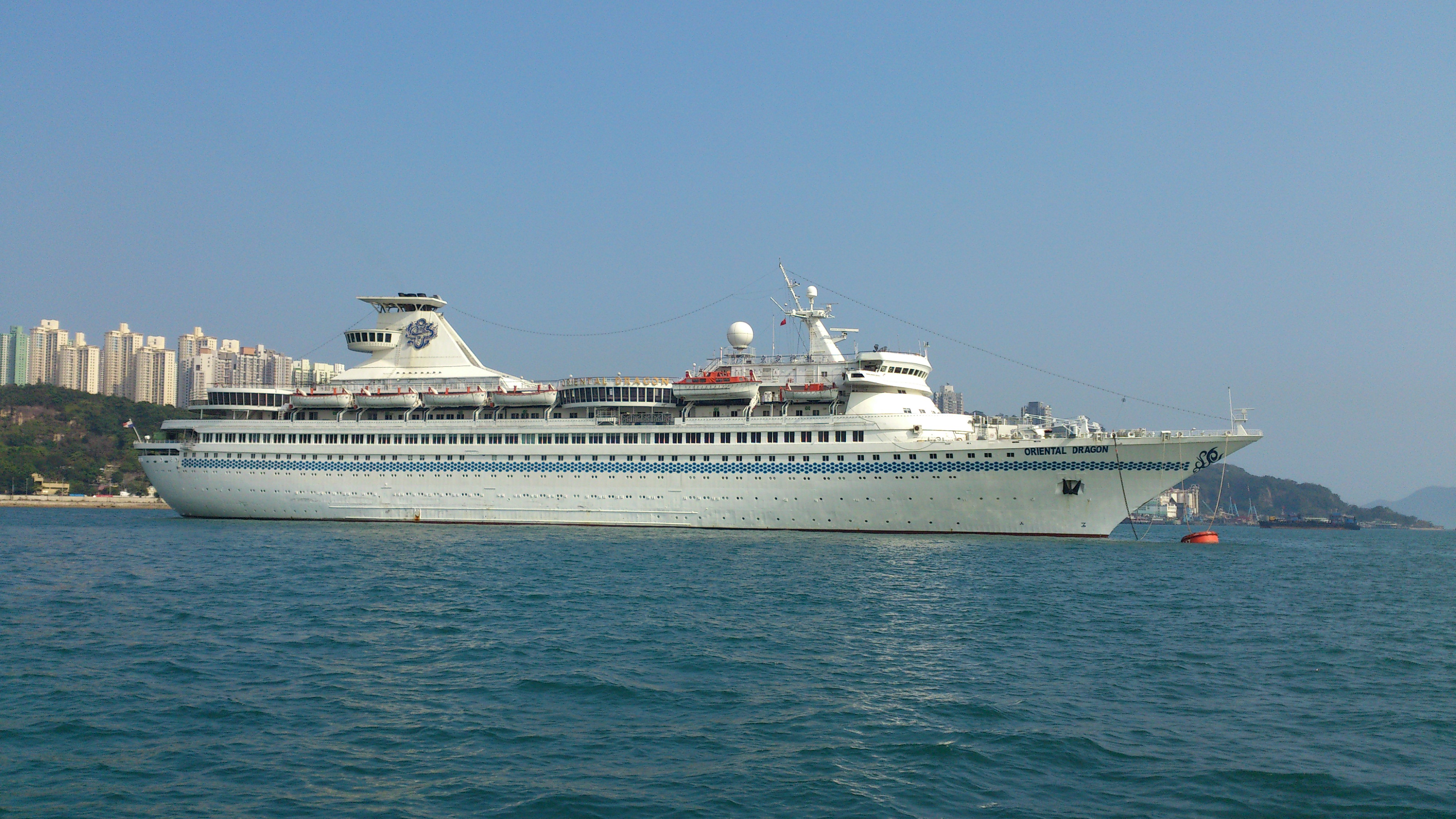
Oriental Dragon leaving Hong Kong

== Media ==
In 1985, Sun Viking appeared in the opening sequences of episode 6 of The Day the Universe Changed

In 2018, Oriental Dragon featured in the movie L Storm.
