= China Grove (Oriental, North Carolina) =

Historic house in North Carolina, United States

- U.S. National Register of Historic Places
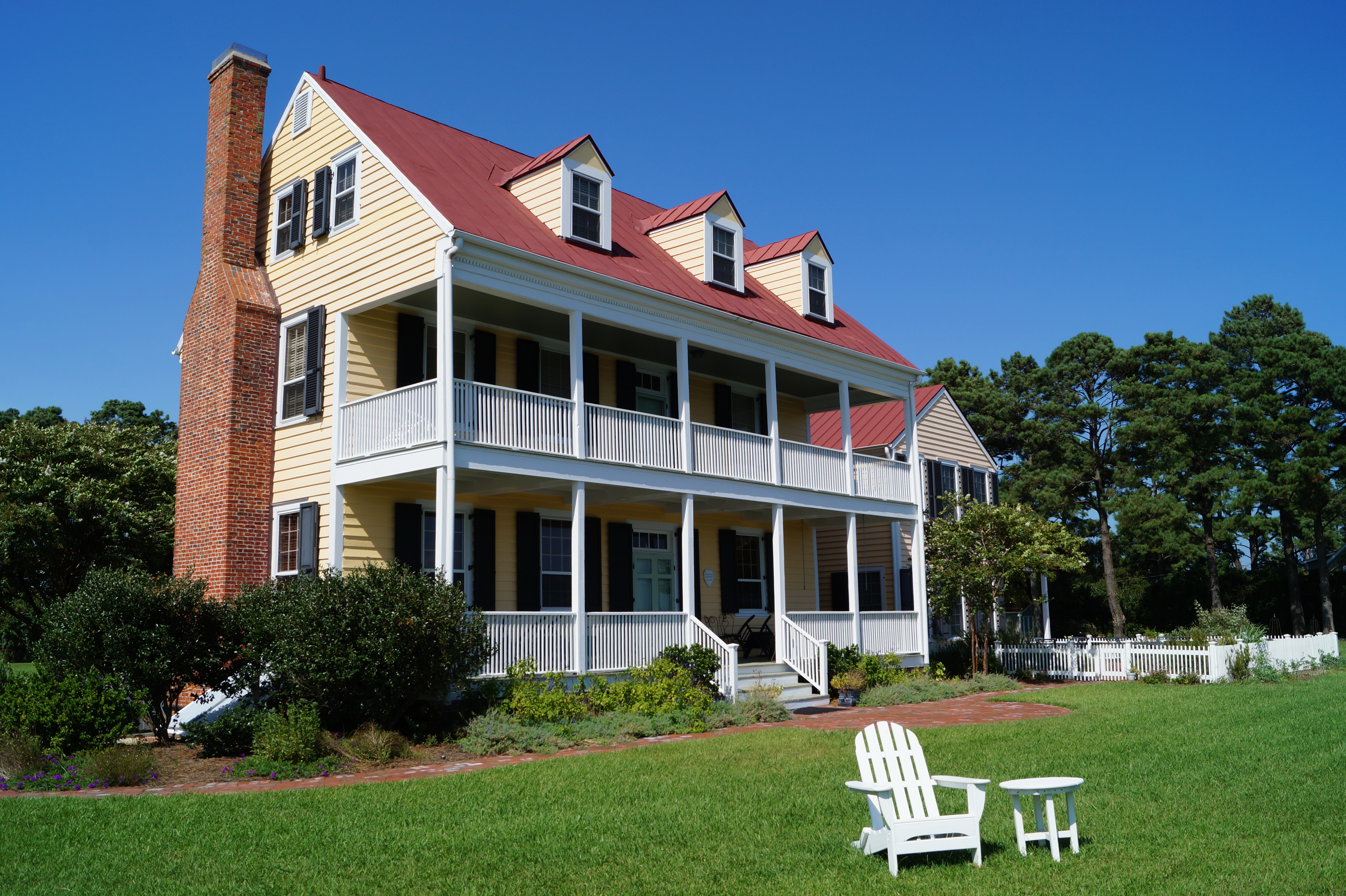

- Location within North Carolina Location within the United States
- Nearest city: Oriental, North Carolina
- Coordinates: 34°59′45.5″N 76°44′29.4″W
- Area: 5 acres (2.0 ha)
- Built: 1790-1813
- Architectural style: Federal
- NRHP reference No.: 73001364
- Added to NRHP: February 6, 1973

China Grove is a historic plantation house located near Oriental, North Carolina. Built sometime in the late-18th century to early-19th century, the Federal style home was named for a row of chinaberry trees that once led to its entrance. China Grove is one of North Carolina's most dramatically sited plantation homes, overlooking the Neuse River at one of its widest points, near the mouth of Dawson's Creek. The house was added to the National Register of Historic Places (NRHP) in 1973.

== History ==
China Grove is thought to be the second oldest house in Pamlico County. While the home's builder and date of construction are uncertain, estimates vary from 1790 to 1813. On November 12, 1803, Edward Carraway was granted a land patent for a 250-acre (100 ha) plantation, with the price being 50 shillings per 100 acres (40 ha). In November of the following year he sold the land to Williams S. Sparrow for $1,300. The change in the property value of the plantation by 1804 suggests that the house was built before then by owner Carraway, although a descendant of Sparrow claims that Sparrow built the house in 1812 or 1813.

Sparrow was involved in the turpentine trade and also the owner of a lumber and grist mill on nearby Beards Creek. When he died in 1827, Sparrow left his family 31 slaves and a considerably larger plantation than what he had originally purchased. According to the 1850 United States census, his widow, Henrietta Sparrow, owned 250 developed acres and 2,500 acres (1,000 ha) of unimproved land, valued at $3,000. The next census showed she owned 28 slaves living in five cabins on her property. China Grove was auctioned off in 1869 for only $50 (~$1,209 in 2025). The winning bidder, Amos Wade, was the first of fifteen successive owners of the property until 1934. That year, owner Gurney P. Hood, the North Carolina Commissioner of Banks, sold China Grove to J. W. Cowell. When Cowell sold the property in 1963 to L. A. Stith, China Grove was in a state of serious disrepair. Stith extensively renovated the house while leaving the major architectural elements unscathed. China Grove was added to the National Register of Historic Places on February 6, 1973.

== Architecture ==
China Grove, one of five similar houses that survived into the twentieth century, is the largest of the group. It is the only house of the group with dormers, which contribute greatly to the airiness of the garret. Its finish is slightly finer, with more elaborate chimneypieces. The China Grove stair is the only one of the five that is decorated with wave brackets under the step-ends. The three-story Federal style building features brick chimneys constructed in a Flemish bond at each end of the house. The home's most notable feature is a two-story front porch under the gable roof that offers views of the Neuse River. The front of the house features four bays while the side of the home is only two bays deep since the front porch acts as a third bay. A modern small one-story porch is located on the rear side of the house. Three dormers are on the front of the house and two are on the rear portion. The original beaded siding has been replaced with simple weatherboards.

The original design of the house included an off-center hallway with a large room on one end and a smaller room on the other end. The smaller room was later divided with the rear portion being converted into a kitchen. Plastered walls and molded chair rails run along the entire lengths of the first and second floors. The Federal style stairway features a transverse landing, a square newel, and a rounded handrail on top of rectangular pickets. The step-ends are decorated with a wavy bracket. The Adamesque style mantels in the larger rooms have fluted pilasters while the smaller rooms have simple paneled pilasters. The attic has three rooms; the stair rises into a center passage. The east room is the same size as the rooms immediately below. The space above the first and second floor west rooms is divided longitudinally into two rooms. These garret rooms have batten doors.

== See also ==
- National Register of Historic Places listings in North Carolina
