= Oriental (steamship) =

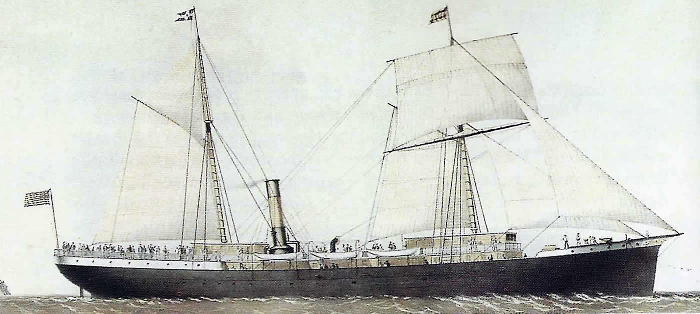

Oriental was an American steamship that ran aground on the Outer Banks of North Carolina on the night of May 16, 1862, and was abandoned.

The 1,202-ton ship had been built by the Neafie and Levy Ship and Engine Building Company at the Penn Works Shipyard in Philadelphia, for the Nuevitas and Cuba Steamship Company, and intended for the Cuba trade. The ship was new, having been completed in 1861. But as the American Civil War was then raging, the American federal government requsitioned the Oriental for war service. At the time of the grounding the ship was carrying supplies to Port Royal in South Carolina which was Union-occupied (and was the location of the Port Royal Experiment).

All crewmen and passengers were saved. An attempt was made to refloat the ship, but this was unsuccessful.

The cause of the grounding is not known. One crewmember said that captain Benjamin J. Tuzoell had fallen asleep, and this story has continued to circulate. Other sources have said that the captain had not trusted the recently recalibrated ship's compass which may have affected his navigation.

Over time the ship deteriorated and became a sunken wreck. The ship's boiler stack remains above water and can be easily seen from shore (as of 2025), and consequently the wreck is sometimes called "The Boiler". It's a scuba diving spot.

There is a small Oriental museum in Oriental, North Carolina (the town was named for the ship).
