= SS El Oriente =

Cargo ship built in 1910 for the Morgan Line

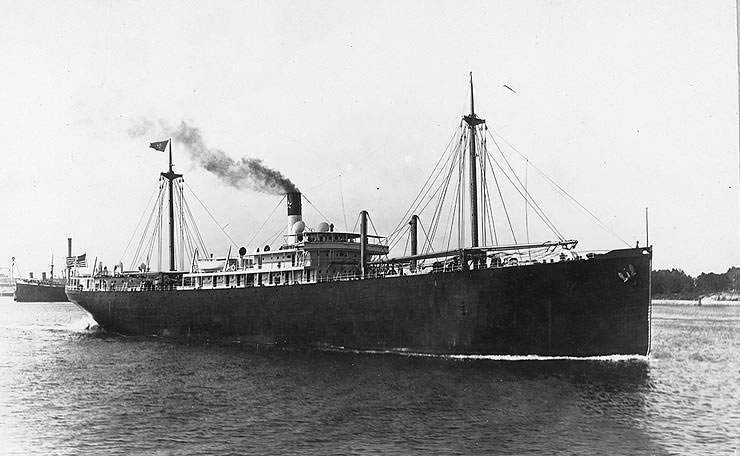
- SS El Oriente before 1917

History
- Name: SS El Oriente
- Owner: Morgan Line
- Builder: Newport News Shipbuilding and Dry Dock Co.; Newport News, Virginia
- Yard number: 130
- Launched: 6 August 1910
- Sponsored by: Miss Margaret H. Patton
- Completed: 20 August 1910
- Identification: U.S. official number: 208080
- Fate: Expropriated for U.S. Navy service

History

United States
- Name: USS El Oriente (ID-4504)
- Acquired: 29 July 1918
- Commissioned: 29 July 1918
- Decommissioned: 15 September 1919
- Fate: Returned to Morgan Line
- Name: 1919–1944: SS El Occidente; 1944–1945: SS Henri Dunant; 1945: SS El Occidente
- Owner: 1919–1941: Morgan Line; 1941–1947: United States Maritime Commission
- Operator: 1919–1941: Morgan Line; 1941–1944: United States Lines; 1944–1945: International Committee of the Red Cross
- Port of registry: 1919–1941: (United States) New York; 1941–1944: Panama; 1944–1945: (Switzerland) Basel
- Route: 1919–1941: New York – Galveston
- Fate: Sold for scrapping 3 July 1946

General characteristics
- Type: Cargo ship
- Tonnage: 6,008 GRT; 6,850 DWT
- Length: 430 ft 2 in (131.11 m)
- Beam: 53 ft 1 in (16.18 m)
- Draft: 26 ft (7.9 m)
- Speed: 17 knots (31 km/h)
- Capacity: 600 horses and mules
- Troops: 2,025
- Complement: 112 (World War I)
- Crew: 45
- Armament: 1 × 4-inch (100 mm) guns (World War I)
- Notes: Sister ship of El Mundo, El Sol, El Occidente

SS El Oriente was a cargo ship built in 1910 for the Morgan Line, a subsidiary of the Southern Pacific Company. During World War I, she was known as USS El Oriente (ID-4504) in service with the United States Navy. At the end of war, she reverted to her original name of SS El Oriente. During World War II she was chartered by the International Committee of the Red Cross (ICRC) as SS Henri Dunant (sometimes also spelled Henry Dunant), but reverted to her original name of SS El Oriente at the end of the charter.

SS El Oriente was one of four sister ships that carried cargo and a limited number of passengers for the Morgan Line. She was acquired by the U.S. Navy in July 1918, and converted to carry horses and mules to France, and after the Armistice, was converted again to carry American troops home from Europe.

El Oriente returned to the Morgan Line in 1919 and sailed with them until June 1941, when the entire Morgan Line fleet was purchased by the United States Maritime Commission. El Oriente served as a civilian-crewed cargo ship during World War II, sailing primarily between the United States and the United Kingdom. In September 1944, she was chartered by the ICRC and sailed under the Swiss flag carrying food parcels to American prisoners of war held in German camps. Henri Dunant continued to sail under Swiss charter until October 1945, when she was returned to the United States and reverted to her former name. El Oriente was placed in the James River Reserve Fleet in November 1945, and was sold for scrapping in July 1946.

== Early career ==
SS El Oriente was a cargo and passenger steamship launched on 11 May 1910 by the Newport News Shipbuilding and Dry Dock Co. of Newport News, Virginia (yard no. 132), and delivered to the Atlantic division of the Morgan Line on 24 October 1910. She was the third of four sister ships; the other three being El Sol, El Mundo, and El Occidente. El Oriente was 6,008 gross register tons (GRT), was 430 feet 2 inches (131.11 m) long by 53 feet 1 inch (16.18 m) abeam, and made 16 knots (30 km/h). The vessel sailed for the Morgan Line, the brand name of the Southern Pacific Steamship Company (a subsidiary of the Southern Pacific Railroad), which employed her to carry cargo and a limited number of passengers between New York; New Orleans, the eastern terminus of the Southern Pacific line; and Galveston, Texas.

== World War I ==
After the United States declared war on Germany in April 1917, it's unclear what role, if any, El Oriente played early on in the war. Her sister ships El Occidente and El Sol were both requisitioned by the United States Shipping Board (USSB) on behalf of the United States Army, and both were designated as animal transport ships. If El Oriente were used by the Army as an animal transport ship, she would have needed a refit which typically meant that any second- or third-class passenger accommodations had to be ripped out and replaced with ramps and stalls for the horses and mules carried. It is known that El Oriente sailed in an American convoy to France on 16 April 1918 with U.S. Navy transports Maui, Calamares, Pocahontas, and Madawaska, British transports Czar and Czaritza, and U.S. cruiser Seattle, and reached France on 28 April. (Note: The convoy was joined by Mount Vernon, which had sailed from Hoboken, New Jersey, on 19 April. See: Crowell and Wilson, p. 607.)

The next recorded activity of El Oriente was on 29 July, when she was acquired by the U.S. Navy and commissioned the same day. El Oriente was assigned to the Naval Overseas Transportation Service (NOTS) and carried animals and supplies for the U.S. Army, joining her two sister ships, El Sol and El Occidente in that duty.

El Oriente's first Navy voyage to France began when she sailed from Newport News with 500 animals on 11 August. Unlike earlier animal transport crossings for the Army, where there was as much as a 4% mortality rate, the voyages in August 1918 and after carried a transport veterinarian and a permanent veterinary detachment to care for the animals while on board the ship. As part of this new program, El Oriente delivered her full load of horses and mules— suffering no losses—at Bordeaux on 2 September. El Oriente made an additional roundtrip with 500 more animals in October, losing only three of her equine cargo during the voyage. El Oriente continued sailing for the NOTS through April 1919, sometimes carrying a small number of troops on return voyages to the United States. At that time El Oriente was converted to carry troops, and assigned to the Cruiser and Transport Force to help return larger numbers American servicemen from Europe.

She sailed on 11 June for Bordeaux and returned with officers and men of the 6th Cavalry Regiment on 4 July. She made additional voyages in July and August, returning 978 members of the 3rd Infantry Division to Philadelphia on the latter voyage. In all, El Oriente returned 2,986 healthy and wounded American servicemen from France in three voyages. On 15 September at Philadelphia, El Orente was decommissioned, and returned to the Morgan Line soon after. (Note: Gleaves (p. 255) reports that El Oriente was given to the Ward Line in August 1919, which contradicts the entry in the Dictionary of American Naval Fighting Ships, and the information in the Miramar Ship Index, a database of historical ship information (See: "El Oriente". Miramar Ship Index. R.B.Haworth..))

== Interwar civilian service ==
El Oriente resumed cargo service with the Morgan Line, and enjoyed a quiet career, typically sailing between New York and Galveston. One event of note occurred in February 1922 when El Oriente came upon the wreck of the schooner, Caldwell H. Colt, which had run aground on a reef near the Tortugas Light during a gale. When El Oriente came upon the hulk, only her captain remained alive, surviving without food or water for several days before his rescue. El Oriente continued on to Galveston and landed the man there.

== World War II ==
In June 1941, the United States Maritime Commission (USMC) announced that it had requisitioned the entire Morgan Line fleet of ten ships, including El Oriente and her remaining sister ships, El Occidente and El Mundo. (Note: The fourth sister, El Sol, had been involved in a collision in 1927 and had been scrapped afterwards. See: Colton, Newport News Shipbuilding.) The ships were to finish previously scheduled cargo runs and be handed over to the USMC over the following six weeks. The USMC had been charged with assembling a 2,000,000 GRT U.S. fleet to "aid the democracies" fighting Germany in World War II, and paid $4.7 million for the ships and a further $2.6 million for repairs and refits.

El Oriente was handed over to the USMC and assigned to United States Lines, Inc., for operation. The cargo ship was placed under Panamanian registry by U.S. Lines. Little is known of El Oriente's movements over the next eight months, but on 17 February El Oriente sailed from Houston, Texas, to Philadelphia and on to Reykjavík. From Reykjavík, she sailed to the Clyde, arriving there at the end of July. Over the next 5 months, El Oriente sailed around the British Isles, calling at Kirkwall, Belfast Lough, Barrow-in-Furness, and Liverpool, and back to Clyde in late December. From there, she sailed on one trip to Murmansk where she arrived on 27 January 1943.

Murmansk had limited port facilities and slow unloading of cargo (often performed by Soviet women and political prisoners), which, coupled with inclement weather and long waits for convoy escorts, often required lengthy stays by Allied cargo ships. El Oriente was no exception, staying in Murmansk for nearly five weeks. To compound the lengthy wait (and, often, accompanying boredom) faced by cargo ships waiting to unload, the nearest German airfield was 35 miles (56 km) away—about 7 to 10 minutes flying time—which gave almost no advance warning of air raids. German dive bombers would silently glide in below Soviet anti-aircraft fire, drop their payloads, and fly away. El Oriente was caught in one such attack on 27 February, with four of the ship's Naval Armed Guards men killed in the attack.

El Oriente departed Kola Inlet on 1 March and returned to Liverpool, from which she sailed in a convoy for New York on 6 April, (Note: El Oriente's sister ship El Mundo sailed in the same convoy, Convoy ON 177. See: "Convoy ON.177". Arnold Hague Convoy Database. ConvoyWeb. The two sailed together in three more convoys—HX 251, HX 286/WN 573, and EN 381/ON 236—throughout the rest of the war. See: "Port Arrivals/Departures: El Oriente". Arnold Hague's Ports Database. Convoy Web.) and returned to Belfast Lough in late June. After calling at Barry and Milford Haven, El Oriente began two roundtrips to New York at the end of June. In October the ship visited Loch Ewe, Methil, and Immingham before returning to New York again in November. After another transatlantic crossing and circuit amongst British ports, El Oriente returned to New York in May 1944.

In June, the cargo vessel sailed to Cuba, calling at Havana and Puerto Tarafa before returning to New York. She next sailed to La Guaira, Venezuela; Maracaibo, Venezuela; and Júcaro, Cuba, before returning to New York in mid August. El Oriente sailed to Philadelphia in mid September in preparation for a charter.

== Red Cross ship ==
On 28 September 1944, El Oriente was chartered by the International Committee of the Red Cross, reflagged as a Swiss ship, and renamed SS Henry Dunant (sometimes erroneously spelled as Henri Dunant), after Red Cross movement founder Henry Dunant. She was last of 14 ships chartered by Swiss interests to sail under the Swiss flag during World War II. On 5 October, Henry Dunant departed Philadelphia with a cargo of mail and 900,000 food parcels intended for Allied prisoners of war interned in German camps.

Henry Dunant continued sailing for the ICRC through 24 October 1945. The ship returned to Norfolk, resumed her former name of El Oriente, and entered the James River Reserve Fleet on 7 November 1945. On 3 July 1946, El Oriente was sold for scrapping to the Patapsco Scrap Co., of Baltimore, Maryland, for $12,175.

== Bibliography ==
- Crowell, Benedict; Robert Forrest Wilson (1921). The Road to France: The Transportation of Troops and Military Supplies, 1917–1918. How America Went to War: An Account From Official Sources of the Nation's War Activities, 1917–1920. New Haven: Yale University Press. OCLC 18696066.
- Gleaves, Albert (1921). A History of the Transport Service: Adventures and Experiences of United States Transports and Cruisers in the World War. New York: George H. Doran Company. OCLC 976757.
- Krenzelok, Greg. "Newport News Animal Transport ship List overseas to France during WW1".
- Morison, Samuel Eliot (June 1975) [November 1947]. History of United States Naval Operations in World War II, Volume One: The Battle of the Atlantic, September 1939 – May 1943. Boston, Massachusetts: Little Brown. OCLC 7395406.
- Naval Historical Center. "El Occidente". Dictionary of American Naval Fighting Ships. Navy Department, Naval History and Heritage Command.
- Naval Historical Center. "El Oriente". Dictionary of American Naval Fighting Ships. Navy Department, Naval History & Heritage Command.
- Naval Historical Center. "El Sol". Dictionary of American Naval Fighting Ships. Navy Department, Naval History & Heritage Command.
