= Oriental Pearl =

Oriental Pearl may refer to:

- MS Oriental Pearl, a cruise ship
- Oriental Pearl Tower, a building in Shanghai, China
- Shanghai Oriental Pearl Media, Chinese company

== See also ==
- Pearl of the Orient (disambiguation)
