= USCGC Sebago =

USCGC Sebago has been the name of two cutters of the United States Coast Guard:

- USCGC Sebago (1930) a Lake-class cutter belonging to the United States Coast Guard from 1930 until 1941. Transferred to Royal Navy as HMS Walney
- USCGC Sebago (WHEC-42) an Owasco-class high endurance cutter which served with the United States Coast Guard from 1945 to 1972.
