= Oriental Hotel =

Oriental Hotel may refer to:

- Mandarin Oriental Hotel, Bangkok, originally opened as The Oriental in 1876
- Oriental Hotel (Kobe, Japan) - opened in 1870
- Oriental Hotel, Manhattan Beach, New York, opened in 1880
- Oriental Hotel, Norwood, former name of The Republic, a pub in Norwood, Adelaide, South Australia

== See also ==
- Eastern & Oriental Hotel, in Georgetown, Malaysia, opened in 1885
- Grand Oriental Hotel, Colombo, Sri Lanka, opened in 1875
- Mandarin Oriental Group, founded 1963, several hotels
- Orient Hotel (disambiguation)
