= Oriental Warehouse =

Historic building in San Francisco, California, US

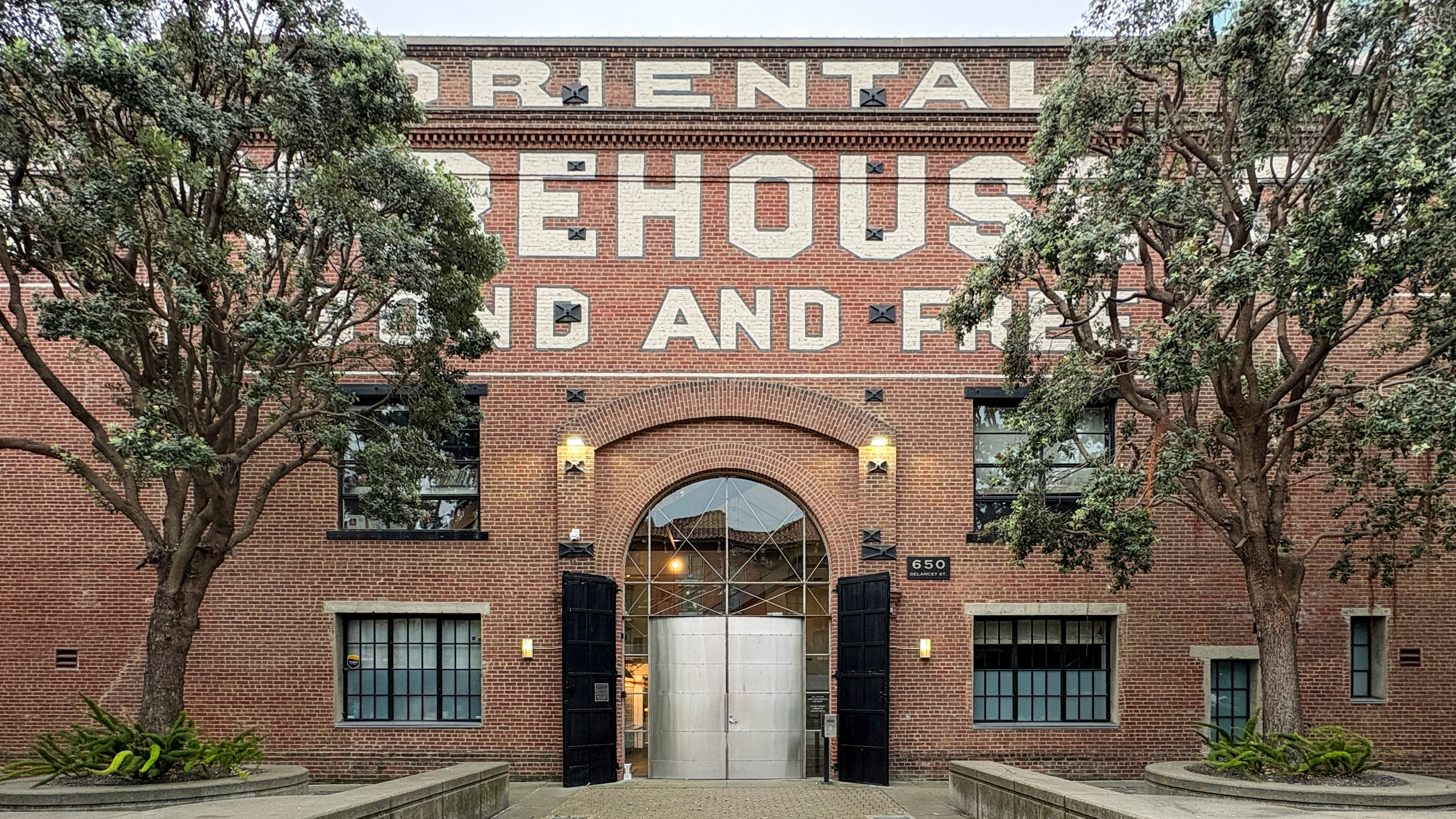
- Interactive map of Oriental Warehouse
- 37.783085°N 122.389539°W
- Location: 650 Delancey Street, South Beach, San Francisco, California, U.S.

History
- Built: 1867; 159 years ago
- Built for: Pacific Mail Steamship Company

Site notes
- Restored: 1996
- Restored by: Fisher–Friedman Associates

San Francisco Designated Landmark
- Designated: October 8, 1977
- Reference no.: 101

Oriental Warehouse, also known as the San Francisco Pacific Mail Steamship Co., at 650 Delancey Street in the South Beach neighborhood of San Francisco, California, is a historic warehouse building turned apartment complex. It is listed as a San Francisco Designated Landmark (No. 101) since October 8, 1977.

== History ==
The Oriental Warehouse was built in 1867 for the San Francisco Pacific Mail Steamship Co., who had establish regular mail, passenger and trade service between the U.S. and Asia. The 650 Delancey Street building was used for imports storage and distribution, primarily consisting of coffee, tea, rice and silk.

The building was also used as an immigration facility to process Chinese and Japanese immigrants, as well other Asian immigrants. It continued for immigration purposes until 1910, when the Oriental Warehouse was replaced by the Angel Island Immigration Station.

Between 1984 and 1992, the San Francisco Landmarks Preservation Advisory Board and Chinatown historians fought for building preservation. After the 1989 Loma Prieta earthquake the brick walls were deemed unsafe. The old roof caught fire in 1995.

The warehouse was converted into 66 apartment lofts for live/work use by Fisher–Friedman Associates in 1996. It was part of a larger neighborhood redevelopment project by the San Francisco Redevelopment Agency.

== See also ==
- List of San Francisco Designated Landmarks
- Chinese Americans in San Francisco
