= Oriental Theatre =

Oriental Theatre or Oriental Theater may refer to:

- Oriental Theatre (Arevelian Tatron)
- Oriental Theatre (Chicago)
- Oriental Theater (Denver, Colorado), listed on the NRHP in Denver, Colorado
- Oriental Theatre (Milwaukee)
- Oriental Theatre (Portland, Oregon)
