= Oriental, North Carolina =

- Town
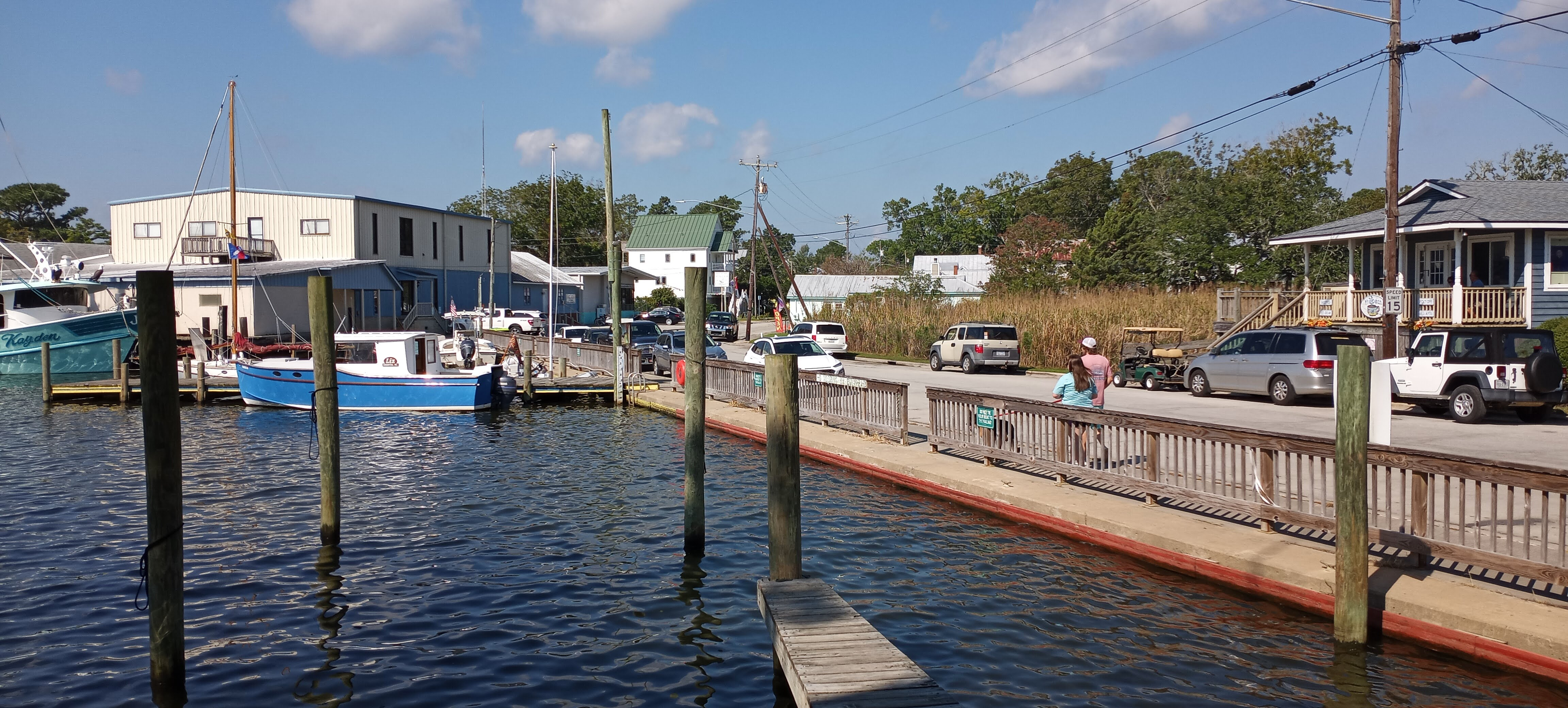
- Town dock

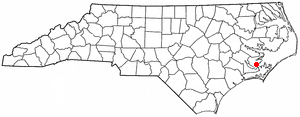
- Location of Oriental, North Carolina
- Coordinates: 35°02′08″N 76°40′55″W
- Country: United States
- State: North Carolina
- County: Pamlico

Area
  - Total: 1.64 sq mi (4.26 km^{2})
  - Land: 1.43 sq mi (3.70 km^{2})
  - Water: 0.22 sq mi (0.56 km^{2})
- Elevation: 0 ft (0 m)

Population (2020)
  - Total: 880
  - Density: 615.4/sq mi (237.59/km^{2})
- Time zone: UTC-5 (Eastern (EST))
  - Summer (DST): UTC-4 (EDT)
- ZIP code: 28571
- Area code: 252
- FIPS code: 37-49380
- GNIS feature ID: 2407053
- Website: www.townoforiental.com
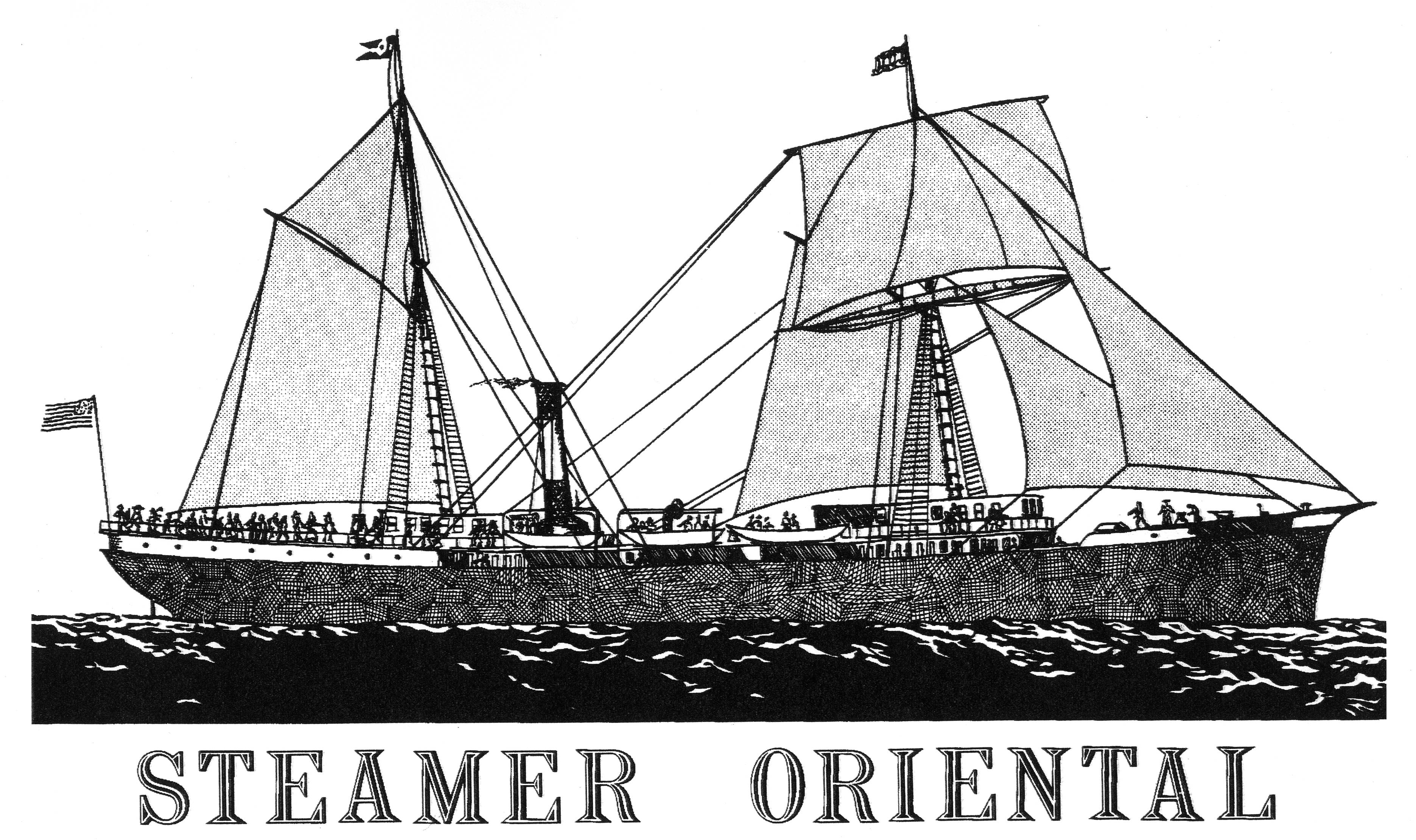

Oriental is one of nine incorporated municipalities in Pamlico County, North Carolina, United States. Oriental is also known as "The Sailing Capital of North Carolina"

The population was 880, according to the 2020 census. It is part of the New Bern Metropolitan Statistical Area.

== History ==
The area was settled by Native Americans, who fished and farmed in the creeks and river long before Europeans arrived. Land records date grants from the King of England to colonial farmers, although the King didn't actually own the land, and several current residents of the area can trace their family's genealogy to these times. The area was the haunt of pirates in the early days of European dominance. The famous pirate Edward Teach, or Blackbeard made his home in Bath, to the north of Oriental. The Midgettes (also Midyettes) and other old families who still have descendants in the town came much later, in the late 19th century.

The town of Oriental was named after the steamship Oriental. Built in Philadelphia in 1861, the ship was used as a Federal transport ship in the American Civil War. She met her fate a year after being launched, run aground in May 1862, when she was wrecked off Bodie Island, 33 miles north of Cape Hatteras. Her passengers and crew were saved.

The United States Post Office Department established a post office in 1886 in what had been called Smith's Creek. Lou Midyette was named postmaster. Postmaster Midyette's wife, Rebecca, thought the village needed a better name. One story says that she had found the nameplate from the wrecked sailing steamer "Oriental" on the beaches of the Outer Banks and thought that name was more suitable. Another version of the story says she just saw the nameplate in a Manteo home. Either way the name "Oriental" made an impression on her. The village became known as Oriental a few years after the post office was established and was incorporated in 1899.

From the early 20th century, Oriental's economy was supported by lumber, fishing and farming. Train service stopped in the 1950s. The last sawmill closed in the early 1960s. Fishing, agriculture, some tourism and marine related businesses now lead the local economy. Fishing trawlers still grace the small harbor, bringing in a catch of shrimp, crab or perhaps flounder depending on the season.

The town was left without a grocery store in 2016 due to Walmart shutting down its express store there after having previously driven other local grocery stores out of business. Oriental re-gained a grocery store six months later when a Piggly Wiggly was opened.

== Local destinations ==
The nameplate of the city's namesake Sailing Steamer Oriental has been lost, but a porthole from the ship is in the Oriental History Museum. The Oriental History Museum offers enlightening displays of Oriental's early years. The Museum and the Oriental Tourism Board have combined to develop a 1.2-mile historical walking tour covering thirty-seven sites.

Two local festivals attract visitors. The Spirit of Christmas, always held in early December, consists of local businesses holding open houses with hot cider and treats, while the local churches hold Nativity plays and host Christmas music concerts. There is sometimes a boat parade in the harbor, where locals decorate their yachts with Christmas lights. The second large town festival, The Croaker Festival, is an arts and vendor event which benefits the county's nonprofits. It culminates in a fireworks display held during the first weekend each July. In addition, the Oriental Rotary Club sponsors an annual catch-and-release tarpon fishing tournament the last weekend in July (2008 was the 16th year) and, on New Year's Eve, the Oriental dragon makes a run through town twice (at 8 p.m. and at midnight). The Oriental Cup Regatta is held the third Saturday of September, and there are boat races most Saturdays from May through September, and very informal ones most Wednesdays, too. Oriental hosts a Celebration of the Arts festival in mid-September, and has other art festivals throughout the year. The Town sponsors free evening concerts once each summer month which have been well attending by county residents and visitors from neighboring Craven and Carteret counties. The Oriental Tourism Board actively promotes weddings in Oriental and has published a Website that lists venues and service providers.

== Geography ==
According to the United States Census Bureau, the town has a total area of 1.4 square miles (3.6 km^{2}), of which 1.1 square miles (2.8 km^{2}) is land and 0.2 square miles (0.52 km^{2}) (16.79%) is water.

== Demographics ==
Historical population
Census	Pop.	Note	%±
1900	300		—
1910	645		115.0%
1920	607		−5.9%
1930	601		−1.0%
1940	535		−11.0%
1950	590		10.3%
1960	522		−11.5%
1970	445		−14.8%
1980	536		20.4%
1990	786		46.6%
2000	875		11.3%
2010	900		2.9%
2020	880		−2.2%
U.S. Decennial Census

=== 2020 census ===
Oriental racial composition
Race	Number	Percentage
White (non-Hispanic)	793	90.11%
Black or African American (non-Hispanic)	42	4.77%
Native American	3	0.34%
Asian	2	0.23%
Other/Mixed	21	2.39%
Hispanic or Latino	19	2.16%

As of the 2020 United States census, there were 880 people, 522 households, and 284 families residing in the town.

=== 2010 census ===
As of the census of 2010, there were 900 people in Oriental and 13,074 in Pamlico County. Oriental had 477 households in the last census.

== Notable person ==
- Kevin Williamson – creator of Scream and Dawson's Creek

== See also ==
- China Grove, a historic plantation home near Oriental
