= USS Virginia (BB-13) =

Pre-dreadnought battleship of the United States Navy

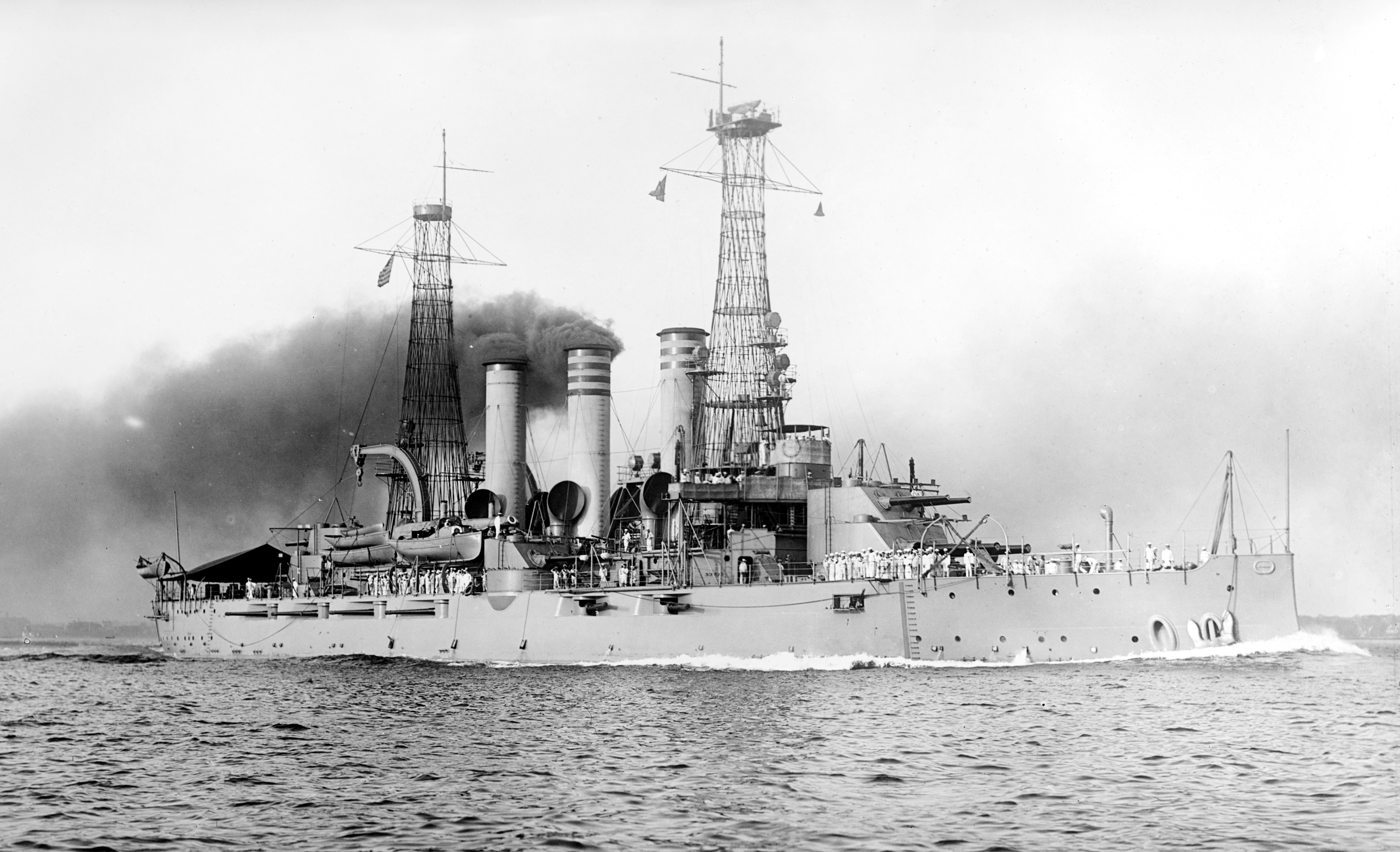
- USS Virginia (BB-13)

History

United States
- Name: Virginia
- Namesake: Virginia
- Builder: Newport News Shipbuilding
- Laid down: 21 May 1902
- Launched: 6 April 1904
- Commissioned: 7 May 1906
- Decommissioned: 13 August 1920
- Fate: Sunk as target, 5 September 1923

General characteristics
- Class & type: Virginia-class battleship
- Displacement: Normal: 14,948 long tons (15,188 t); Full load: 16,094 long tons (16,352 t)
- Length: 441 ft 3 in (134 m)
- Beam: 76 ft 3 in (23 m)
- Draft: 23 ft 9 in (7 m)
- Installed power: 24 × Niclausse boilers; 19,000 ihp (14,000 kW)
- Propulsion: 2 × triple-expansion steam engines; 2 × screw propellers
- Speed: 19 kn (35 km/h; 22 mph)
- Complement: 812
- Armament: 4 × 12 in (305 mm)/40 caliber Mark 4 guns; 8 × 8 in (203 mm)/45 cal guns; 12 × 6 in (152 mm)/50 cal Mark 6 guns; 12 × 3 in (76 mm)/50 cal guns; 12 × 3-pounder guns; 4 × 21 inch (533 mm) torpedo tubes
- Armor: Belt: 6–11 in (152–279 mm); Barbettes: 10 in (254 mm); Turrets: 12 in (305 mm); Conning tower: 9 in (229 mm)

USS Virginia (hull number BB-13) was a United States Navy pre-dreadnought battleship, the lead ship of her class. She was the fifth ship to carry her name. Virginia was laid down in May 1902 at the Newport News Shipbuilding and Dry Dock Company in Newport News, Virginia, was launched in April 1904, and was commissioned into the fleet in May 1906. The ship was armed with an offensive battery of four 12-inch (305 mm) guns and eight 8-inch (203 mm) guns, and she was capable of a top speed of 19 knots (35 km/h; 22 mph).

For the duration of her career, Virginia served in the Atlantic Fleet, much of it spent conducting peacetime training exercises to maintain fleet readiness. In 1907–1909, she took part in the cruise of the Great White Fleet around the world. She was involved in the American intervention in the Mexican Revolution in 1913–1914, including the occupation of Veracruz. After the United States entered World War I in April 1917, she was used first to train gunners for the expanding wartime fleet, and later to escort convoys to Europe. During this period, she served briefly as the flagship of the 1st and 3rd Divisions, Battleship Force. After the war ended in November 1918, she was assigned to the operation to transport American soldiers back from France. Virginia was decommissioned in 1920 and eventually expended as a target ship in 1923 under the terms of the Washington Naval Treaty.

== Design ==
Design work on the Virginia class began in 1899, after the United States' victory in the Spanish–American War, which had demonstrated the need for sea-going battleships suitable for operations abroad, finally resolving the debate between proponents of that type and those who favored low-freeboard types useful for coastal defense. The designers included a superposed arrangement of the main and some of the secondary guns, which proved to be a significant disappointment in service, as firing either set of guns interfered with the others, slowing the rate of fire.

Plan and profile of the Virginia class

Virginia was 441 feet 3 inches (134.49 m) long overall and had a beam of 76 ft 3 in (23.24 m) and a draft of 23 ft 9 in (7.24 m). She displaced 14,948 long tons (15,188 t) as designed and up to 16,094 long tons (16,352 t) at full load. The ship was powered by two-shaft triple-expansion steam engines rated at 19,000 indicated horsepower (14,000 kW), with steam provided by twenty-four coal-fired Niclausse boilers. The propulsion system generated a top speed of 19 knots (35 km/h; 22 mph). As built, she was fitted with heavy military masts, but these were quickly replaced by cage masts in 1909. She had a crew of 812 officers and enlisted men.

The ship was armed with a main battery of four 12 in (305 mm) /40 caliber Mark 4 (Note: /40 refers to the length of the gun in terms of calibers. A /40 gun is 40 times long as it is in bore diameter.) guns in two twin gun turrets on the centerline, one forward and aft. The secondary battery consisted of eight 8 in (203 mm) /45 caliber guns and twelve 6 in (152 mm) /50 caliber guns. The 8-inch guns were mounted in four twin turrets; two of these were superposed atop the main battery turrets, with the other two turrets abreast the forward funnel. The 6-inch guns were placed in casemates in the hull. For close-range defense against torpedo boats, she carried twelve 3-inch (76 mm)/50 caliber guns mounted in casemates along the side of the hull and twelve 3-pounder guns. As was standard for capital ships of the period, Virginia carried four 21 inch (533 mm) torpedo tubes, submerged in her hull on the broadside.

Virginia's main armored belt was 11 in (279 mm) thick over the magazines and the machinery spaces and 6 in (152 mm) elsewhere. The faces of the main battery gun turrets (and the secondary turrets on top of them) were 12-inch (305 mm) thick. Each turret rested on a supporting barbettes that had 10 in (254 mm) of armor plating. The conning tower had 9 in (229 mm) thick sides.

== Service history ==
=== Construction and the Great White Fleet ===
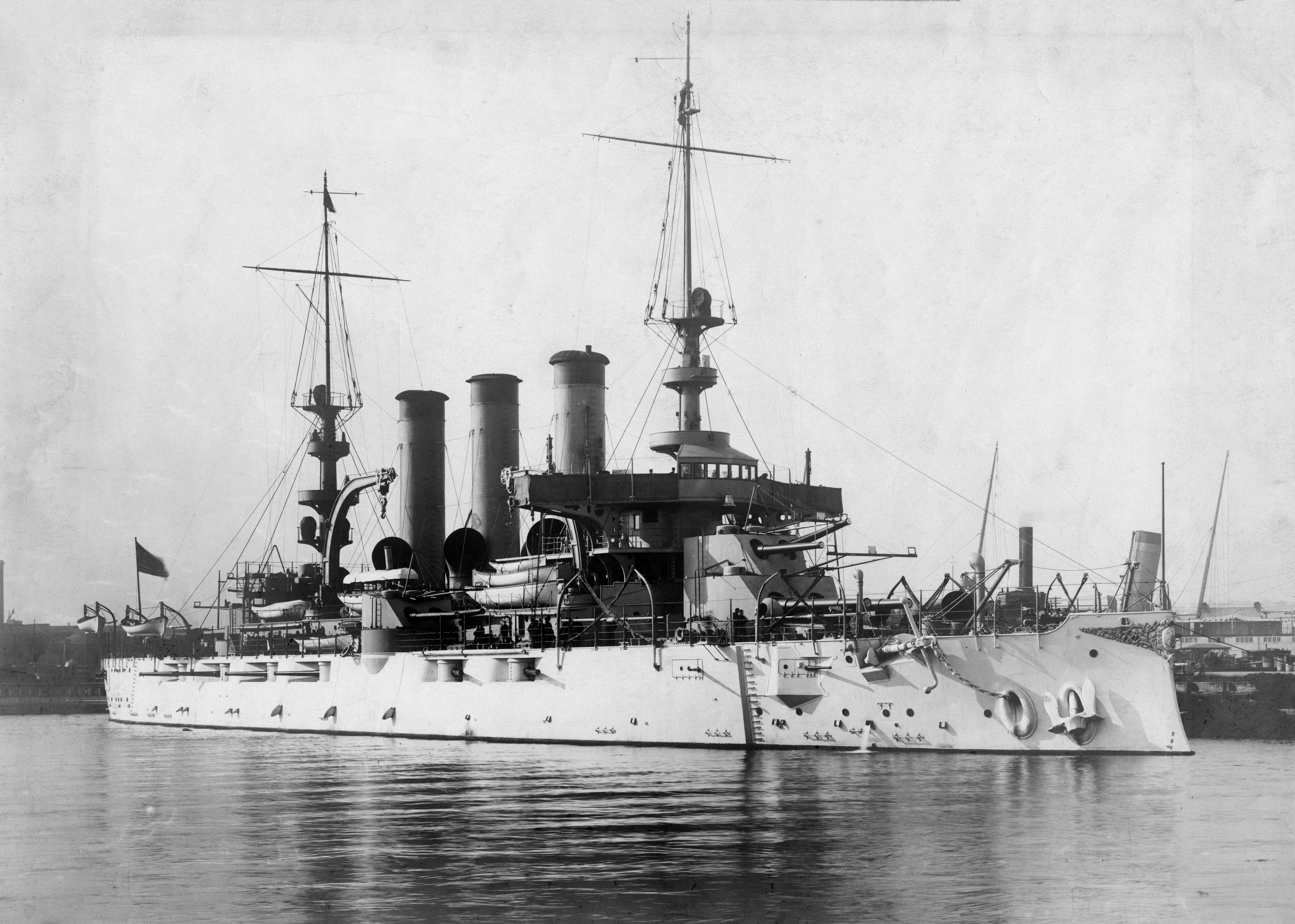
Virginia in port c. 1906–1907

Virginia was laid down at the Newport News Shipbuilding on 21 May 1902 and was launched on 5 April 1904. She was commissioned for active service on 7 May 1906. Captain Seaton Schroeder was the ship's first commander. Virginia began a shakedown cruise in Chesapeake Bay, Virginia, to Newport, Rhode Island, then to Long Island, New York, before arriving in Bradford, Rhode Island on 9 August. Sea trials followed off Rockland, Maine, in which the ship recorded an official speed of 19.734 knots (36.547 km/h; 22.709 mph)., before proceeding to Oyster Bay, Long Island, where she was reviewed by President Theodore Roosevelt from 2 to 4 September. The ship returned to her shakedown cruise. In the meantime, a revolution had begun in Cuba against President T. Estrada Palma, who requested United States intervention to protect his government. Virginia was sent on 15 September to protect Havana from attack; she remained there from 21 September to 13 October, when she returned to Sewell's Point, Virginia.

Virginia then proceeded to Norfolk, where she coaled before continuing on to Tompkinsville, Staten Island. She then steamed to the New York Navy Yard and went into the drydock to have the bottom of her hull painted. The ship returned to the Norfolk Navy Yard for repairs that lasted from 3 November 1906 to 18 February 1907, following a collision with the steamship Monroe in the Norfolk-Cape Henry Channel. The accident caused significant damage to both vessels and it was alleged that Virginia's steering systems had malfunctioned, contributing to the accident. A fire control device was installed between 19 February and 23 March. Virginia then returned to Cuba, arriving in Guantánamo Bay on 28 March. She conducted gunnery training off Cuba until 10 April, when she departed for Hampton Roads, Virginia, where she remained from 15 April to 15 May. During this period, she participated in the Jamestown Exposition to commemorate the 300th anniversary of the Jamestown colony. An international fleet that included British, French, German, Japanese, and Austro-Hungarian warships joined the US Navy at the event. In mid-May, when she went into the Norfolk Navy Yard for repairs, which lasted into early June. From 7 to 13 June, she took part in a naval review for Roosevelt in Hampton Roads. Target practice followed off Cape Cod Bay from mid-June to mid-July. Virginia and the rest of her division then cruised the east coast, stopping in Newport, New York City, and Provincetown, followed by night battle training in Cape Cod Bay.

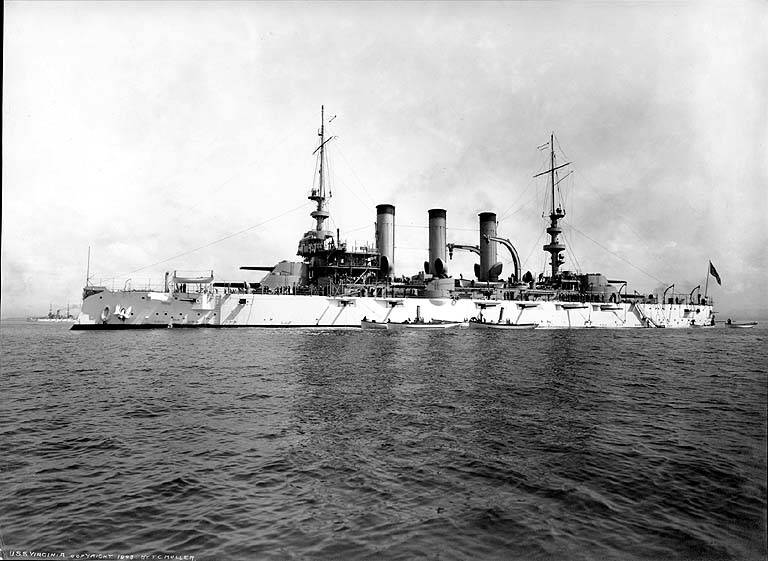
Virginia in 1908

In September 1907, Virginia returned to the Norfolk Navy Yard for maintenance, which lasted from 24 September to 24 November. It was here that she was equipped with some of the first ship-borne short-range radio equipment, intended for use during the upcoming circumnavigation of the globe., She thereafter moved to the New York Navy Yard for additional repair work before returning to Hampton Roads on 6 December. Over the following ten days, the ship's crew made preparations for a circumnavigation of the globe by the Great White Fleet. The cruise of the Great White Fleet was conceived as a way to demonstrate American military power, particularly to Japan. Tensions had begun to rise between the United States and Japan after the latter's victory in the Russo-Japanese War in 1905, particularly over racist opposition to Japanese immigration to the United States. The press in both countries began to call for war, and Roosevelt hoped to use the demonstration of naval might to deter Japanese aggression.

On 17 December, the fleet steamed out of Hampton Roads, and cruised south to the Caribbean and then to South America, making stops in Port of Spain, Rio de Janeiro, Punta Arenas, and Valparaíso, among other cities. After arriving in Mexico in March 1908, the fleet spent three weeks conducting gunnery practice. The fleet then resumed its voyage up the Pacific coast of the Americas, stopping in San Francisco and Seattle before crossing the Pacific to Australia, stopping in Hawaii on the way. Stops in the South Pacific included Melbourne, Sydney, and Auckland.

After leaving Australia, the fleet turned north for the Philippines, stopping in Manila, before continuing on to Japan where a welcoming ceremony was held in Yokohama. Three weeks of exercises followed in Subic Bay in the Philippines in November. The ships passed Singapore on 6 December and entered the Indian Ocean; they coaled in Colombo before proceeding to the Suez Canal and coaling again at Port Said, Egypt. The fleet called in several Mediterranean ports before stopping in Gibraltar, where an international fleet of British, Russian, French, and Dutch warships greeted the Americans. The ships then crossed the Atlantic to return to Hampton Roads on 22 February 1909, having traveled 46,729 nautical miles (86,542 km; 53,775 mi). There, they conducted a naval review for Roosevelt.

=== 1909–1916 ===
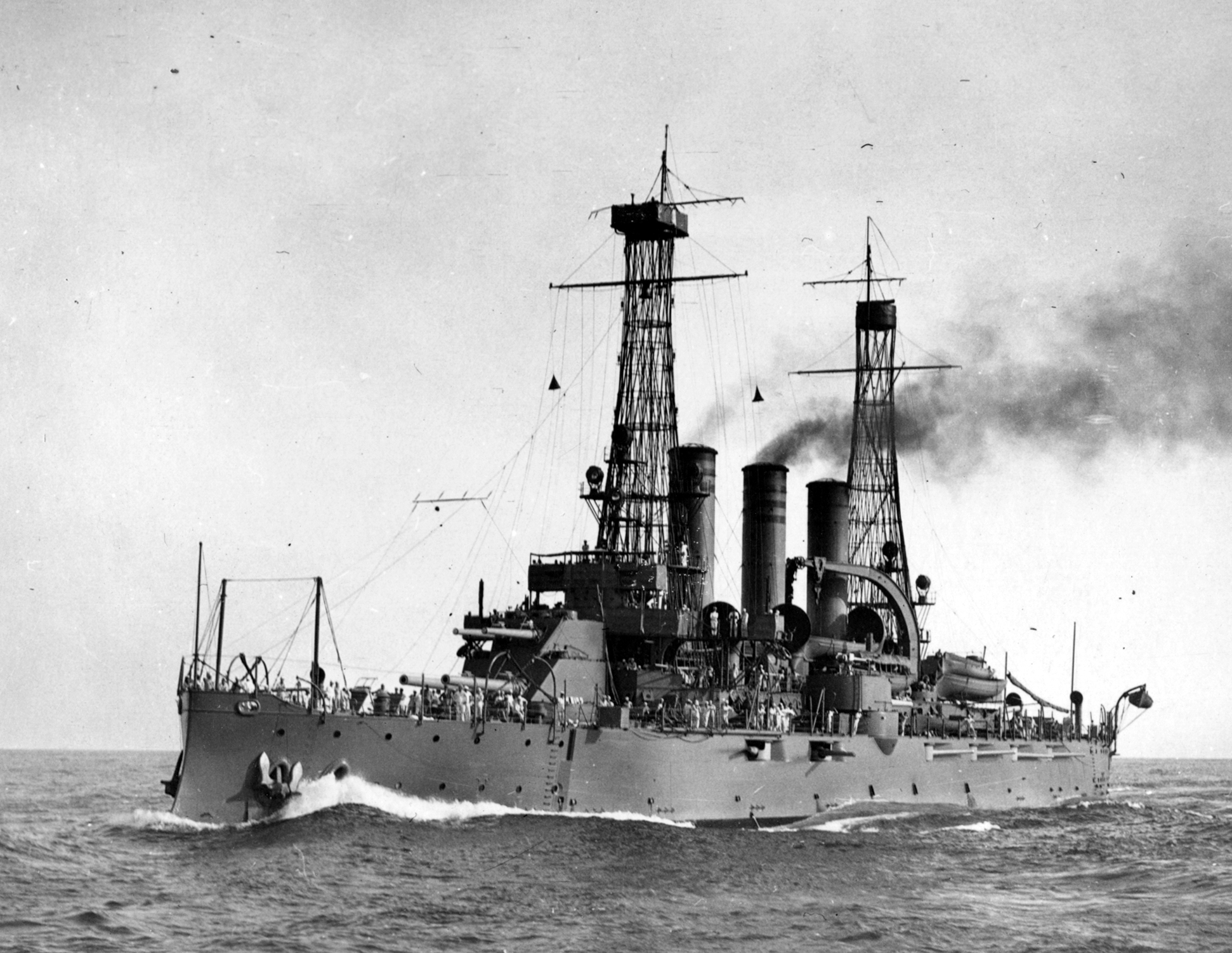
Virginia, circa 1910–1913

Starting on 26 February, Virginia went into drydock at the Norfolk Navy Yard for repairs after the two-year voyage. The ship required extensive maintenance, which lasted until 26 June. The following fifteen months were spent conducting the normal peacetime training routine, with various maneuvers off the Virginia Capes and Newport. In late 1909, Virginia and other ships from the Atlantic Fleet crossed the Atlantic to visit Brest, France, and Gravesend, England; the visits lasted from 15 November to 7 December in Brest and 8 to 29 December in Gravesend. The fleet returned to Guantánamo Bay for maneuvers, which lasted from 13 January to 13 March 1910. Virginia then returned to the Virginia Capes for more exercises. She and her sister ship Georgia left on 11 April, bound for the Boston Navy Yard, arriving on the 13th for another round of periodic maintenance. Repairs to Virginia lasted until 24 May, when the ship steamed to Provincetown. There, she experimented with equipment to coal while underway with the collier Vestal and conducted torpedo training. She was back in Boston by 18 June.

For the next three years, Virginia adhered to the peacetime training routine with few interruptions. By 1913, conditions in Mexico during the Mexican Revolution began to worsen, and the US Navy began to deploy warships to the country to protect American nationals in the country. Virginia operated there out of Tampico and Veracruz from 15 February 1913 to 15 March before returning to the east coast of the United States for more training. In May, she participated in a ceremony to dedicate the USS Maine National Monument. Virginia was back in Mexican waters by 4 November, when she arrived in Veracruz; she cruised Mexican waters until January 1914, when she departed for Cuba. There, she conducted fleet maneuvers until mid-March, followed by additional training exercises off the Virginia Capes and gunnery training in Chesapeake Bay. The latter included firing on the wreck of San Marcos (formerly the battleship Texas). Most of April was spent at the Boston Navy Yard for repairs.

In the meantime, the United States had occupied Veracruz in the aftermath of the Tampico incident. Virginia was sent there to support operations against Mexico after emerging from the shipyard, arriving on 1 May. She remained there into early October, interrupted only by gunnery practice from 18 September to 3 October in Guantánamo Bay. After departing Veracruz in October, she returned to the east coast of the United States, where she remained through early 1916. On 20 March, she was placed in reserve at the Boston Navy Yard for a major overhaul; she was still undergoing repairs in April 1917 when the United States declared war on Germany, entering World War I.

=== World War I ===
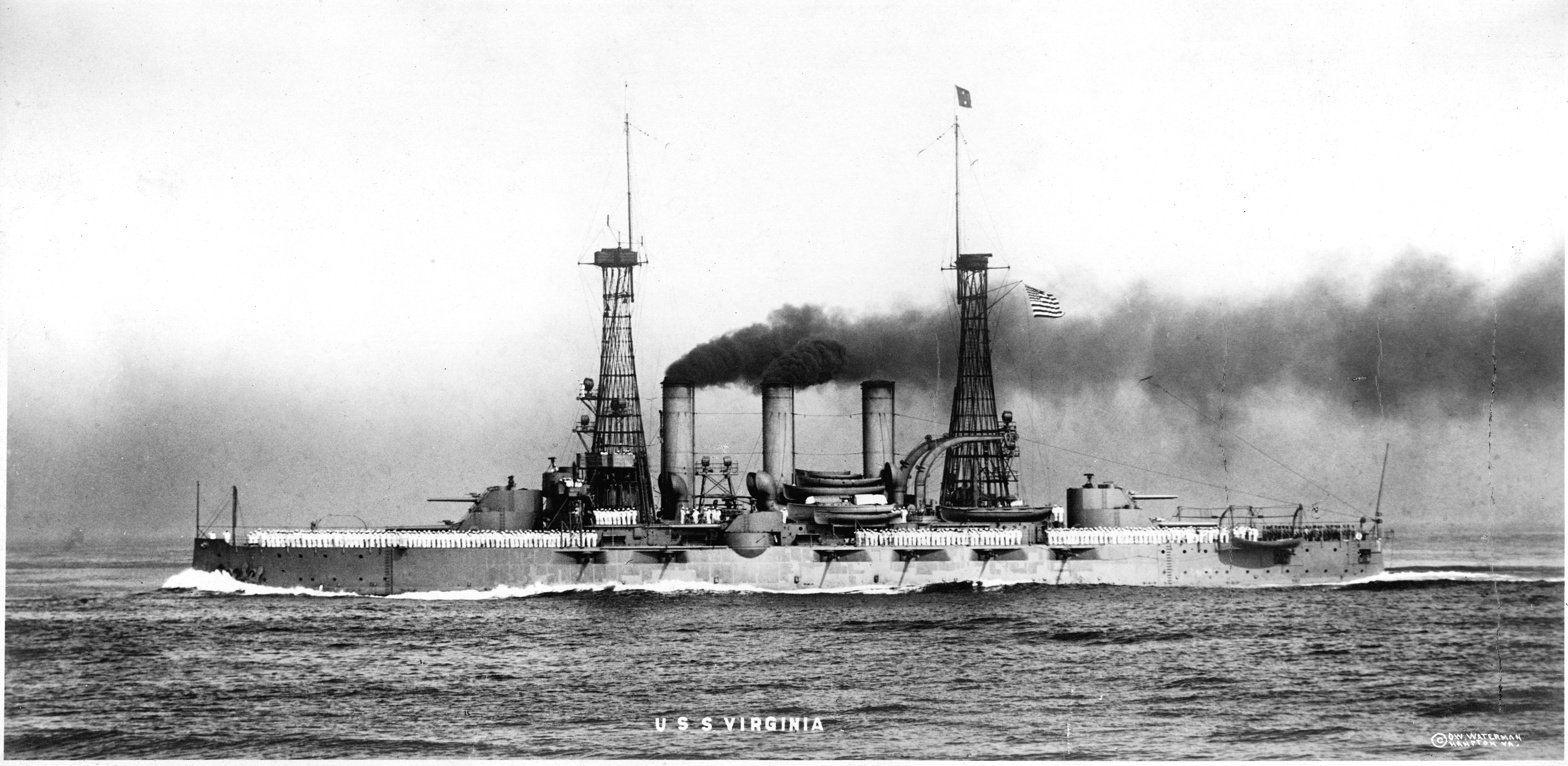
Virginia underway c. 1914–1916

Upon the United States' entry into the war, the US Navy seized all German merchant ships that had been interned earlier in the conflict. Virginia's crew went aboard several German vessels in Boston, including Amerika, Cincinnati, Wittekind, Köln, and Ockenfels. Repair work to Virginia was finally completed by 27 August, allowing the ship to steam to Port Jefferson, New York, where she joined the 3rd Division, Battleship Force of the Atlantic Fleet. She served as a gunnery training ship for the next year. Admiral Albert W. Grant, the commander of the Battleship Force, complained that the men under his command were very poorly trained. He reported that 87 percent of the enlisted men from Virginia had never served aboard a warship, and most of the officers were themselves insufficiently trained. During this period, she had two brief stints as a flagship, the first in December as the 1st Division flagship under Rear Admiral John A. Hoogewerff, and the second for the 3rd Division commander, Rear Admiral Thomas Snowden.

In late 1918, Virginia was overhauled at the Boston Navy Yard, after which she was tasked with escorting convoys halfway across the Atlantic, to rendezvous points where other escorts would take them to France. Her first convoy—a troopship convoy with 12,176 soldiers aboard—left New York on 14 October. She escorted another convoy on 12 November, though Germany signed the Armistice that ended the fighting in Europe the day before. With the war over, Virginia was equipped to transport American soldiers back from France; the modifications included extra bunks and mess facilities. On 17 December, she steamed out of Norfolk on her first of five trips to Brest, France. This trip was made in company with her sister ship Rhode Island, and the two ships arrived in Brest on 30 December. They took on 2,043 soldiers before departing three days later. The ship's captain, Henry Joseph Ziegemeier, refused to ferry Black units (such as the 369th Infantry Regiment) home to the United States "on the grounds that no blacks had ever traveled on an American battleship." Her last voyage ended on 4 July 1919 in Boston, and in the course of the five trips, she carried 6,037 soldiers back to the United States.

=== Fate ===
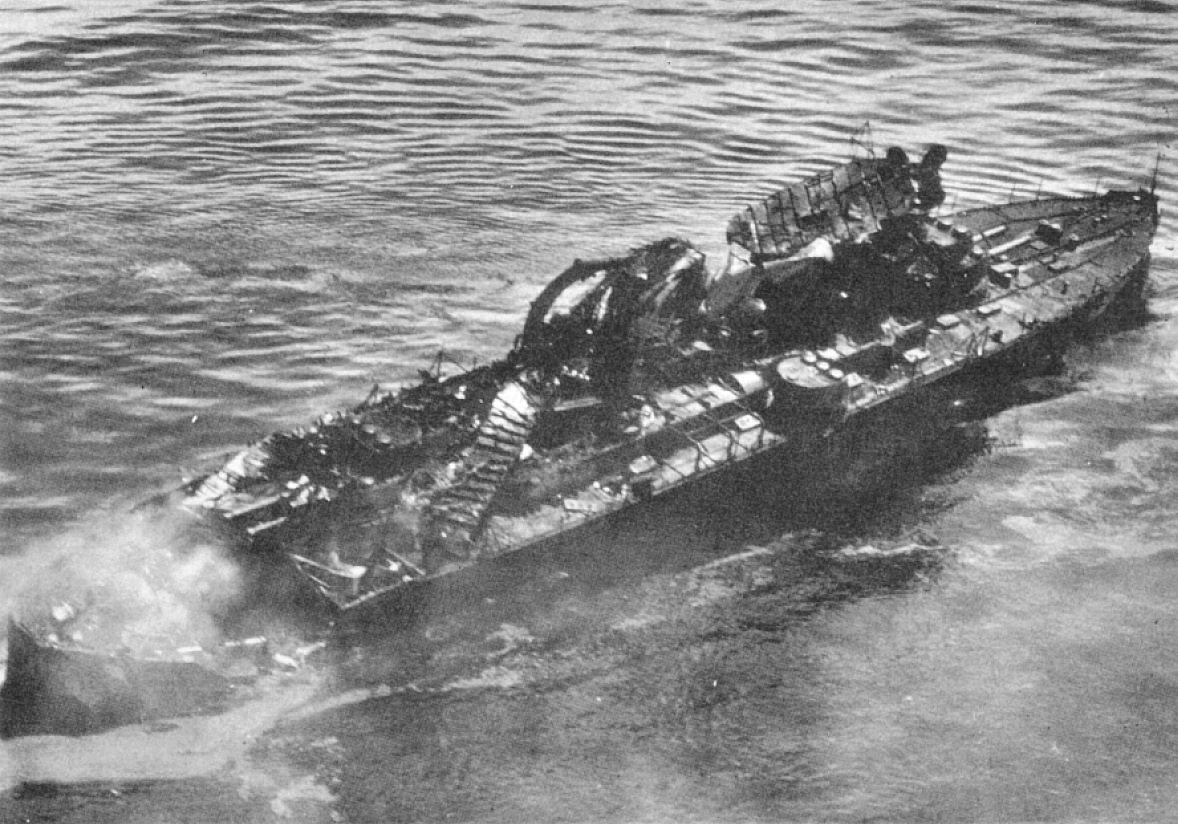
Virginia after the aerial bombing test, shortly before sinking

Virginia christened the Commonwealth dry dock at Boston in January 1920 by gliding through a string of flowers draped across its entrance and "cutting the ribbon" for the important new facility, and then remained there for a year, being reclassified as BB-13 on 17 July 1920 and decommissioned on 13 August. According to the terms of the 1922 Washington Naval Treaty, which mandated significant cuts in naval strength, Virginia was to be discarded; she was initially put up for sale on 12 July 1922, but the Navy instead transferred the ship to the War Department on 6 August 1923. Virginia was instead to be expended as a target ship for bombing tests, along with her sister New Jersey and the battleship Alabama. These tests would be held in cooperation with the US Army Air Service, under the supervision of General Billy Mitchell.

On 5 September, Virginia and New Jersey were anchored off the Diamond Shoals lightship, off Cape Hatteras, North Carolina for the tests, which were conducted by the Martin NBS-1 bombers of the 2nd Bombardment Group. Observers were aboard the Army transport ship St. Mihiel. The bombing runs began just before 9:00, and on the third attack seven NBS-1s dropped a pair of 1,100-pound (500 kg) bombs each, scoring two hits that caused extensive damage. The blast destroyed the bridge and knocked down both masts and all three funnels. The rest of the bombs landed close to the ship, causing major underwater damage. Within twenty minutes, Virginia capsized, and ten minutes later, she slipped beneath the waves sinking to 50 fathoms (300 feet), joining New Jersey, which had been sunk earlier that day.
