= Edmund Billings =

Edmund Billings (January 14, 1868 – February 7, 1929) was a Canadian-born American financier, banker, sociologist, philanthropist, and government official who served on a number of relief committees and was Collector of Customs for the Port of Boston during World War I.

== Early life ==
Billings was born in St. George, New Brunswick on January 14, 1868, to Edmund and Elizabeth (Sutherland) Billings. At the age of five his family moved to Boston. He was educated at the Brimmer School and Evening High School and took night classes at Harvard University. Billings worked as a messenger boy for Western Union and a clerk in an art store before beginning a career in charity work. On October 1, 1896, he married Elizabeth Child of Stamford, Connecticut. They had two children, Edmund Jr. and Katherine.

== Charity work ==
At the age of twenty-one, Billings was appointed superintendent of the Wells Memorial Institute. He later served as its treasurer. Upon the death of its founder, Robert Treat Paine in 1910, Billings became president of the institute. He held this position until he left the Institute in 1922. He also served as the superintendent of the People's Institute.

Billings was a member of relief committees that aided the victims of the 1906 San Francisco earthquake, Great Chelsea Fire of 1908, Great Salem Fire of 1914, the 1908 Messina earthquake, and the Halifax Explosion. During World War I, Billings served as a member of the emergency committee of the American Red Cross' Boston chapter. For his work after the Messina earthquake he received an audience with King Victor Emmanuel III, was awarded a medal by the Italian Government, and had the first street built in Messina after the earthquake named in his honor. Upon his return he was awarded a medal by Italian Americans in Boston.

In 1911 Billings helped found the Boston City Club, a social club that focused on "the city of Boston and the problems of its growth." He was an inaugural member of the club's executive committee. Billings was a founder of the Good Government Association of Boston and the Public School Association. He was also a director of the Children's Aid Society, a trustee of the Women's Educational and Industrial Union, and a member of the Boston Athletic Association, National Exchange Club, National Municipal League, and the American Academy of Political and Social Science.

== Business career ==
Billings worked for Lee, Higginson & Co., a Boston investment bank. In 1911 he was named President of the Paul Revere Trust Co. He also served as a director of the State Street Trust Company, Home Savings Bank, Workingmen's Building Association, and president and director the Workingmen's Loans Association.

== Government service and political involvement ==
During the Spanish–American War, Billings served as a second lieutenant in the 5th Provisional Massachusetts Regiment.

Billings was involved in a number of municipal political campaigns in Boston. In 1910, he served as manager of James J. Storrow's unsuccessful campaign for Mayor of Boston.

=== Collector of Customs ===
On October 8, 1913, Billings was appointed Collector of Customs for the Port of Boston by President Woodrow Wilson.

On January 23, 1915, Billings and other Customs officials moved into the new Custom House Tower, which had been completed after four-and-a-half years of work and at a cost of about $1.8 million. In September 1915, after a man committed suicide by jumping off of the observation deck of the Custom House Tower, Billings ordered that the deck be to the public until the balcony was screened in. At noon on April 6, 1916, Billings started the clock on the Custom House Tower.

Prior to the United States' involvement in World War I, Billings worked to maintain the country's neutrality. In March 1915 he established a code signal for foreign ships leaving the port of Boston for Europe. On February 5, 1917, upon orders from Washington, Billings deployed guards to prevent the crews of the one Austrian and five German vessels in the port from leaving their ships. The following day he had a conference with the captains of the ships during which it was agreed that the captains and first officers of five of the six vessels would be allowed to move freely, but report to their vessels regularly. The crew members would be allowed to leave if they received a permit from the immigration officer. An 11 pm curfew was also established for crew members. On April 6, 1917, in anticipation that Congress would declare war on Germany, Billings ordered that five German ships (the Amerika, Cincinnati, Wittekind, Köln, and Ockenfels) be seized.

In 1918 Billings raised the salaries of the port's lowest-paid employees. That same year he was reappointed by Wilson. In 1921 he stepped down as Collector to go into the insurance business.

=== Committee work ===
Prior to the Boston Police Strike in 1919, Billings was appointed by Mayor Andrew James Peters to serve on a Citizens' Committee to see that the public was protected in the event of a strike. In 1921, Peters named him chairman of the Boston Transit Commission. In 1927, Billings and his wife were appointed by Boston Mayor Malcolm Nichols to serve on a committee to assist him in the celebration of Lindbergh Day. That same year he was appointed by State Democratic Chair Charles H. McGlue to serve on a committee that worked on the unsuccessful effort to bring the 1928 Democratic National Convention to Boston.

== Later life and death ==
From 1921 to 1928, Billings served as vice-president and treasurer of John Paulding Meade Company, an insurance firm. He then joined Field & Cowels, another insurance firm.

In 1923, Billings' apartment was broken into and $200 worth of jewelry was stolen.

In 1929, Billings help found and was elected president of the Charles River Basin Association, an organization created to oppose the construction of a road along the Boston side of the Charles River Basin and champion the improvement of recreational facilities on the basin.

On February 4, 1929, Billings fell ill at his office. He later suffered a heart attack and developed pneumonia. He died three days later at his residence on The Fenway in Boston's Back Bay.

Government offices
| Preceded by Edwin Upton Curtis | Collector of Customs for the Port of Boston; 1913–1921 | Succeeded by Willfred W. Lufkin |
