= SS Willehad =

German-built passenger and cargo ship

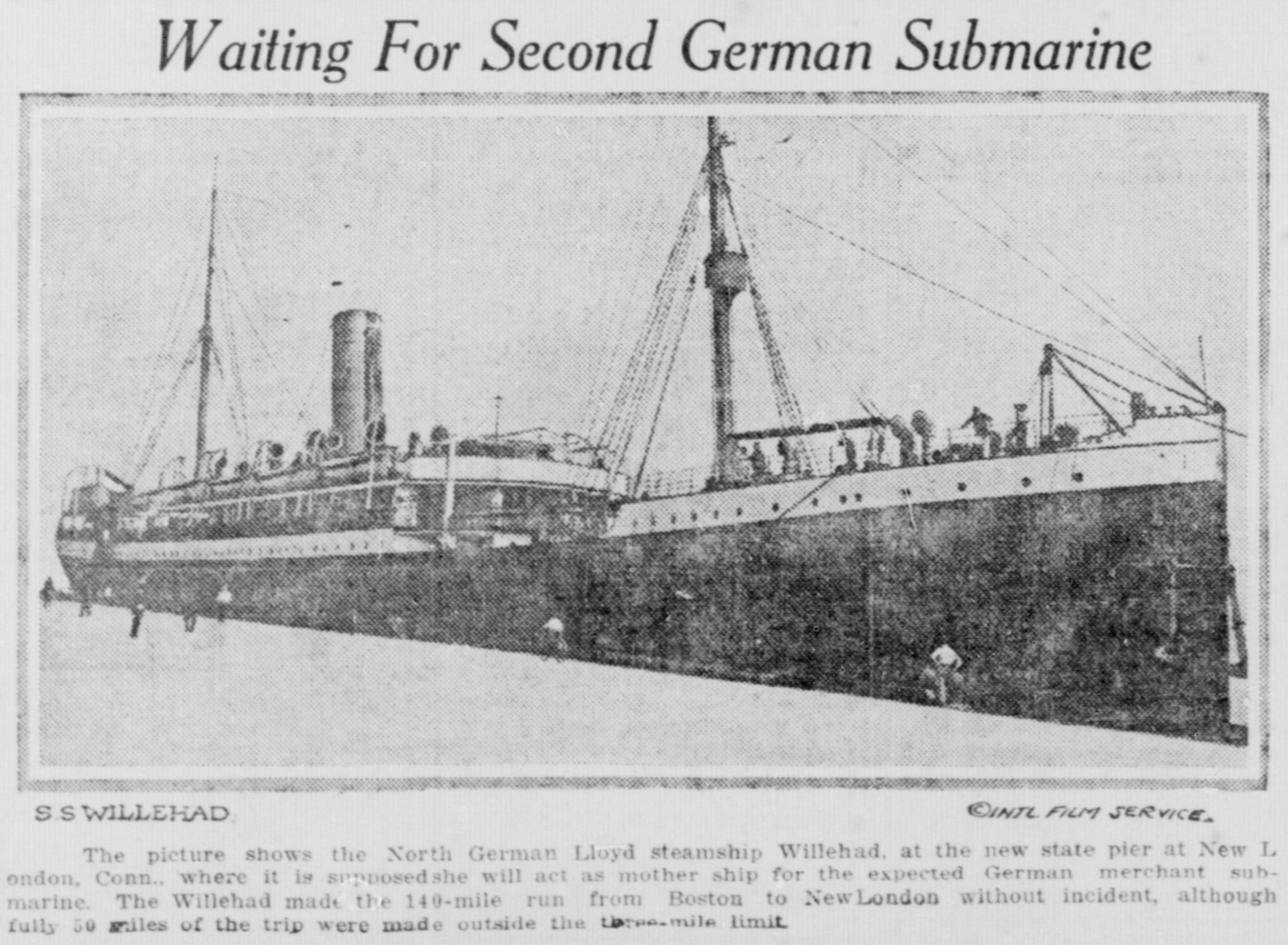
- Willehad in a 1916 newspaper report

History
- Name: 1894: Willehad; 1918: Wyandotte
- Namesake: 1894: Willehad; 1918: Wyandotte Nation
- Owner: 1894: Norddeutscher Lloyd; 1917: US Shipping Board
- Port of registry: 1894: (German Empire) Bremen; 1917: (United States) New York
- Route: 1894: Bremen – Hoboken; 1895: Bremen – Baltimore; 1900: Bremen – Sydney; 1901: Bremen – South America; 1904: Stettin – New York; 1905: Yokohama – Sydney; 1912: Hamburg – Montreal
- Builder: Blohm+Voss, Hamburg
- Launched: 1894
- Completed: May 1894
- Maiden voyage: May – June 1894
- Refit: 1900; 1917
- Identification: 1894: code letters QFVL; by 1914: call sign DWH; 1917: US official number 215297; 1917: code letters LHMD
- Fate: scrapped 1924

General characteristics
- Type: passenger ship
- Tonnage: 4,761 GRT, 3,012 NRT
- Length: 383.4 ft (116.9 m)
- Beam: 46.0 ft (14.0 m)
- Depth: 27.2 ft (8.3 m)
- Decks: 2
- Installed power: 514 NHP or 1,100 ihp
- Propulsion: 2 × triple-expansion engines; 2 × screws
- Speed: 12 knots (22 km/h)
- Capacity: passengers: 1894: 105 × 2nd class; 1,009 × 3rd class; 1900: 150 × 1st class; 40 × 2nd class; 40 × 3rd class
- Crew: 70
- Sensors & processing systems: by 1910: submarine signalling
- Notes: sister ship: Wittekind

SS Willehad was a passenger and cargo steamship that was built in Germany in 1894 for Norddeutscher Lloyd (NDL). For her first few years she took emigrants from Bremen to the United States. In 1900 she made one round trip between Bremen and Australia via the Suez Canal. Between 1901 and 1903 her route was between Bremen and South America. For a few months in 1904 she sailed between Stettin in Germany (now Szczecin in Poland) and New York. From the end of 1904 to the beginning of 1907 she was a mail ship between Japan and Australia. From 1911 until 1914 she ran transatlantic services between Hamburg and the United States, and also between Hamburg and Canada.

When the First World War began in 1914, she sheltered in Boston. In 1916 she became the first foreign ship to use the recently built Cape Cod Canal, as she moved to New London, Connecticut to be a submarine tender to the cargo submarines Deutschland and Bremen. The US government seized her in 1917 and gave her to the United States Shipping Board (USSB), who in 1918 renamed her Wyandotte. After the end of the First World War she made at last two round trip voyages between the US and France, and repatriated a few dozen US troops. In 1920 she tramped as a purely cargo ship. She was scrapped in the US in 1924.

== Building and identification ==
In 1894 Blohm+Voss in Hamburg built a pair of twin-screw steamships for NDL. Wittekind was launched on 3 February and completed in April. Willehad was completed in May.

Willehad's registered length was 383.4 ft (116.9 m), her beam was 46.0 ft (14.0 m), and her depth was 27.2 ft (8.3 m). Her tonnages were 4,761 GRT and 3,012 NRT. She had berths for 1,114 passengers: 105 in second class, and 1,009 in third class. Her ballast tanks carried 600 tons of fresh water, instead of sea water. This gave her enough of a fresh water supply for her third class passengers to bathe daily. In her third class dining saloon, the tables could be hoisted to the ceiling after dinner, clearing the floor for dancing. Her sick bay had five rooms, each with berths for ten patients. She had steel-hulled lifeboats.

Willehad had a pair of three-cylinder triple-expansion engines. Their combined power was rated at 514 NHP or 1,100 ihp, and gave her a speed of 12 knots (22 km/h). She had a crew of 70. NDL registered Willehad at Bremen. Her code letters were QFVL.

== New York and Baltimore ==
On 24 May 1894 Willehad left Bremen with 432 passengers on her maiden voyage. On 7 June she reached Hoboken after a voyage of 13 days and 13 hours. She remained on this route until October, and then on 10 November left Bremen on a voyage to South America. By March 1895 she was back on the Bremen – Hoboken route, on which she remained until September 1895. In October 1895 NDL transferred her to its route between Bremen and Baltimore. For the rest of the 1890s her usual route was between Bremen and Baltimore, apart from three voyages between Bremen and Hoboken in 1896, and another three in 1899–1900.

In January 1896 Willehad sailed to Hoboken, arriving on 1 February, but by mid-March she had reverted to the Baltimore route. She made two trips to Hoboken in early November and early December 1896. She then reverted to the Baltimore route, and on 1 January 1897 ran aground off Cape Henry when leaving Baltimore for Bremen in dense fog. The steam pilot boat from Norfolk, Virginia helped to refloat her at high tide. In April 1897 she made another trip to Hoboken, but in August and November 1897, and April 1898, her voyages were to Baltimore. By July 1898 NDL was offering weekly sailings between Bremen and Baltimore, with each ship completing a round trip on the route every six weeks.

On one westbound crossing, Willehad was slowed by gale-force winds from 26 December 1898 until 1 January 1899. Her passengers were kept below decks for days. A wave swept the stock of an anchor, weighing 800 to 1,000 pounds (360 to 450 kg), from her fo'c's'le to her main deck. A reel with 100 feet (30 m) of steel cable was also swept to the main deck. One of her steam winches was torn from its mountings, and its steam pipe ripped up. About 20 feet (6 m) of the railing of her fo'c's'le was swept away. One of the doors of her third class accommodation burst open, causing flooding with water 3 feet (1 m) deep. Willehad reached Baltimore on 10 January, six days late.

On 19 March 1899 Willehad left Bremen with 850 passengers. On 24 March, at position 48°N 25°W, her starboard propeller shaft broke, and she lost her starboard propeller. She turned back, and on 28 March reached Falmouth, Cornwall. After repairs she resumed her voyage, and on 11 April she reached Hoboken. She then continued to Galveston, where she arrived shortly after 3 May. She loaded a cargo of cotton, and left for Bremen on 15 May. She then returned to her route between Bremen and Baltimore.

In 1898 an electrician in Willehad's crew, Adolph Pahlmann, had courted a Viennese passenger, Marie Brenner, and the couple had become engaged. Brenner went to stay with her uncle in Kansas, but the next year, on 13 August 1899, the couple were married in Baltimore. They held their wedding reception at a German-owned restaurant there, and spent their wedding night in a room over the restaurant. The couple planned to move to Pahlmann's home city of Hanover, Germany, with the bride sailing as a passenger aboard Willehad. Early the next morning Pahlmann went to rejoin his ship, and his bride went back to bed for a few hours. A few hours later, the restauranteur found her dead from coal gas poisoning. She had turned off a gaslight, but the valve was not fully closed, and she was poisoned in her sleep. Her funeral was held on 16 August, and the next day Pahlmann left Baltimore aboard Willehad. A few hours after sailing, Pahlmann and another crewman were on deck when a great wave hit the ship and threw them against a bulkhead. Pahlmann was knocked unconscious, and his shipmate's leg was broken in two places. The ship's doctor treated the two men, but 20 minutes later Pahlmann was dead. At 17:00 hrs on 18 August, Willehad stopped in mid-ocean and lowered her colors. Pahlmann's funeral was held, and he was buried at sea.

Willehad remained on NDL's Baltimore route until November 1899, and then in December 1899 and January 1900 made two voyages between Bremen and Hoboken.

== Australia via Suez ==
In 1900 Willehad's passenger accommodation was refitted. Instead of a two-class ship with more than 1,000 third class and no first class, she became a three-class ship with berths for only 230 passengers: 150 in first class, 40 in second class, and 40 in third class. She made one round trip on the Reichspostdampfer route between Bremen and Sydney, New South Wales via the Suez Canal, as a temporary substitute for the liner Gera. She left Bremerhaven on 18 July 1900, and called at Antwerp, Southampton, Genoa, Naples, Port Said, Suez, and Colombo.

Her reception in Australia was mixed. On 30 August she reached Western Australia, where she was greeted as "the smallest vessel of the Norddeutscher Lloyd that has visited Fremantle". One Perth newspaper said "From outward appearances the vessel does not give a favorable impression not being up to the standard of the Norddeutscher Lloyd liners in cleanliness or beauty". On 5 September she anchored in Largs Bay, South Australia with 236 passengers, of whom 40 were for Adelaide. On 8 September she reached Melbourne, Victoria, where she was described as "a shapely vessel" that was "bound to establish herself in the public favour". On 12 September she berthed in Woolloomooloo Bay in Sydney.

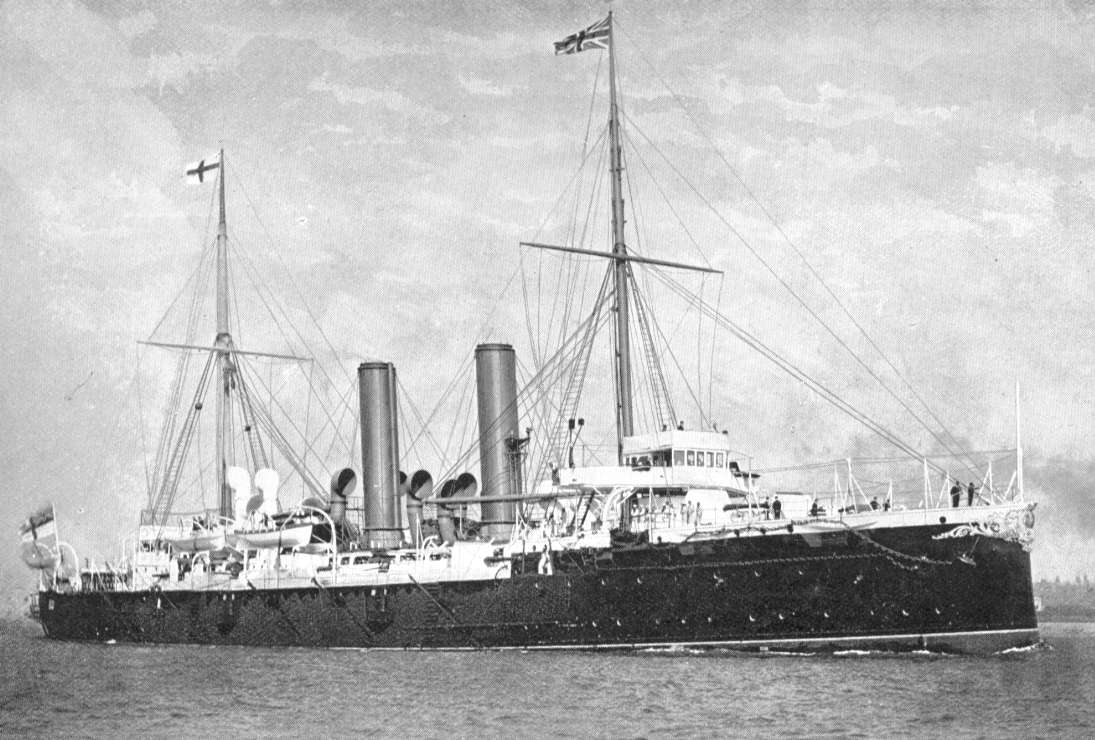
Protected cruiser HMS Royal Arthur

On 22 September she left Sydney on her return voyage to Bremen. She called at the same ports as on her outward voyage. As she left Adelaide on 29 September, she saluted the Australia Station flagship HMS Royal Arthur by lowering her German ensign, and by her band playing God Save the King. She reached Bremen on 15 November.

== Changes of route ==
NDL transferred Willehad to its route between Bremen and South America. She made 12 voyages on this route, the last of which began from Bremen on 23 May 1903.

In March 1904 NDL and Hamburg America Line (HAPAG) announced a joint service between Scandinavian ports and New York. Two ships would serve the route: NDL's Willehad and HAPAG's Adria. The service was to be called "Scandia Line" – not to be confused with the Danish Scandinavian America Line. HAPAG and NDL aimed to undercut Cunard Line, which also served this route. Fares were $18 from Scandinavia to New York, and $16 from New York to Scandinavia. Willehad worked the route from Stettin, from which she made her first Scandia Line sailing on 3 May 1904. She called at Helsingborg and Gothenburg in Sweden, and Kristiansand in Norway. She arrived in New York on 19 May, carrying 218 steerage class passengers. She made three round trips on this route. Her final Scandia Line voyage began from Stettin in August, and she was scheduled to leave New York for the return voyage on 17 September.

== Far East ==
During the Russo-Japanese War, the Russian Empire expelled several hundred Japanese from Vladivostok, Port Arthur (now Dalian in China), and Outer Manchuria. Two railway trains had taken the refugees to Bremen, and from there NDL took them to Japan. Sources differ as to whether Willehad took them all the way from Bremen to Japan, or the NDL liner Großer Kurfürst took them to Fremantle, where on 21 November 1904 they were transferred to Willehad. They also disagree as to whether the number of refugees was 707 or 832.

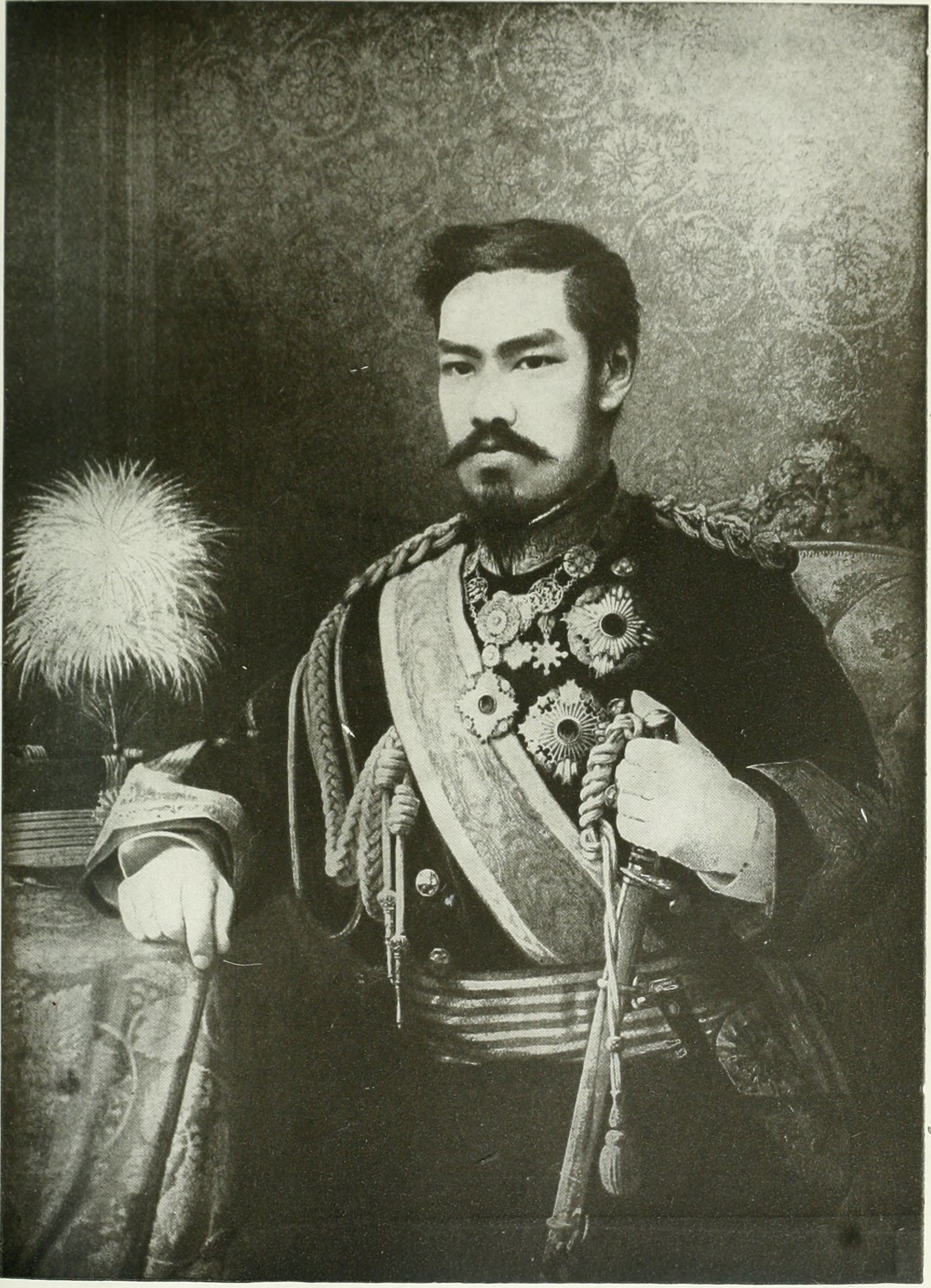
Emperor Meiji of Japan

Either way, Willehad took the Japanese via Singapore, where on 26 November, as she was leaving her wharf, she collided with the Burns, Philp steamship Airlie. Two plates on the starboard bow of Airlie's hull were damaged, and a guard-rail at Airlie's stern was damaged. She reached Nagasaki on 6 December, and continued via Moji and Kobe to Yokohama, where she arrived on 12 December. At each port the Japanese entertained Willehad's officers, and at Yokohama Emperor Meiji received them, and gave Willehad's Master, Captain Zurbonsen, an award.

NDL planned a new mail service between Yokohama and Sydney via Kobe, Hong Kong, German New Guinea, New Britain, and Brisbane. Willehad started on the route from Yokohama on 31 December 1904, and reached Sydney on 1 February 1905. Her running mates on the route were Prinz Waldemar and Prinz Sigismund. By April 1906, Willehad's ports of call also included Manila in the Philippines. On 15 December 1906 she left Melbourne, for a voyage via Sydney, Newcastle, Manila, and Java. She then returned to Bremen, where she arrived on 20 March 1907.

== From Hamburg to Boston ==
By June 1910 Willehad was equipped with submarine signalling, and by June 1911 she was also equipped with wireless telegraphy. In November 1911 she made a voyage from Rotterdam to Baltimore. By May 1912 she was serving a route between Hamburg and Montreal via Rotterdam. In January 1913 she arrived in Philadelphia.

By 1914 Willehad's wireless call sign was DWH. On 10 July 1914 she left Hamburg on her twenty-fourth voyage to Quebec and Montreal. By the end of July 1914 she was in Montreal, loading a cargo that included wheat, barley, flour, and oil cake. In response to the July Crisis, 200 Austro-Hungarian reservists in Canada booked to sail on her to return home. However, on the eve of war the German government ordered her to leave Montreal and seek refuge in neutral Boston, to avoid being seized in Canada. She left Montreal early on the morning of 1 August. War was declared on 3 August, but Willehad evaded the cruiser HMS Essex, and reached Boston on 5 August. Willehad stayed at anchor near Boston's quarantine station until 27 August, when she moved to Charlestown, Boston to discharge her cargo into bonded storage, including 57,671 bushels of wheat and 29,950 bushels of barley to the Boston and Maine Railroad's grain elevator.

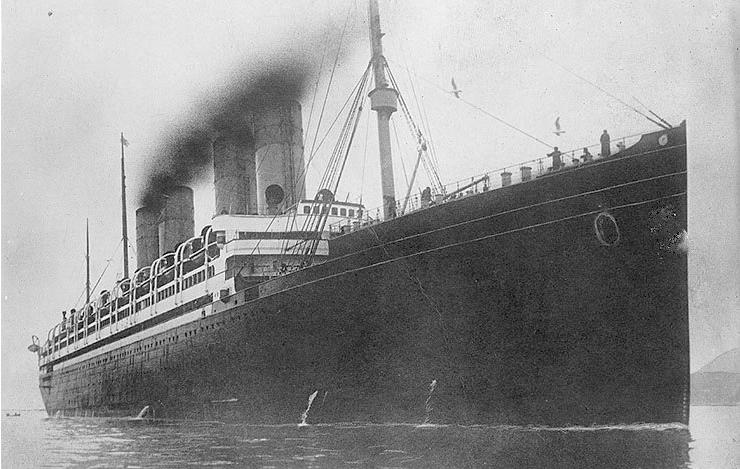
In November 1914 Kronprinzessin Cecilie moved from Bar Harbor, Maine and joined the other German ships in Boston

The DDG Hansa cargo ship Ockenfels also reached Boston on 5 August. In the next few days and weeks they were joined by the HAPAG liners Amerika and Cincinnati; the Austro-Hungarian steamship Erny; and three other NDL ships: the cargo liner Köln; Willehad's sister ship Wittekind; and later the liner Kronprinzessin Cecilie. In order to save on port dues, the ships moved to anchorages after discharging their cargo. They moved back into Boston Harbor for the winter of 1914–15, and then returned to their anchorages near Boston's quarantine station at the end of March 1915. The US Navy positioned the cruiser USS Brooklyn to keep all of the anchored ships under constant surveillance.

In 1915, events such as the Thrasher incident at the end of March and the Sinking of RMS Lusitania early in May increased tension between the US and Germany. At the end of May, US armed forces were ordered to fire upon any German or Austro-Hungarian ship that tried to leave a US port, and to sink her if she did not heave to.

== From Boston to New London ==
In August 1916 the Eastern Forwarding Company (EFC), agents for the cargo submarines Deutschland and Bremen, chartered Willehad. On 23 August she left dry dock, bunkered several hundred tons of coal, ice and stores, and returned to her pier. An application was made for two ships to use the Cape Cod Canal. Permission was granted for Willehad, but the other ship, whose name was not disclosed, was larger, and permission for her was denied. She embarked a full crew, and early on 24 August was piloted out of Boston. A tugboat met her off Plymouth, Massachusetts and accompanied her to the mouth of the Cape Cod Canal. The canal had opened on 29 July 1914, and Willehad became the first foreign ship to use it.

A tug of the T.A. Scott Towing Company, Alert, put out of New London to try to meet Willehad and convoy her into port, but ran into thick fog. Alert carried Captain Hinsch, EFC's Marine Superintendent, who was previously Master of the NDL liner Neckar. At 16:00 hrs on 24 August Willehad passed Hen and Chickens Light in Buzzard's Bay, but ran into afog an hour later, and anchored for the night. The next morning she got underway at 05:00 hrs, and docked in New London just before 10:00 hrs.

Willehad was moored to piling in the Thames River, with her stern against the river bank. About 50 feet (15 m) to one side of her was the State Pier, which had recently been built at a cost of $1 million. The EFC had hurriedly built a corrugated iron shed, 400 by 25 feet (122 by 8 m), on the pier. Between the pier and Willehad's bow, EFC built a floating gate 30 feet (9 m) high. This enclosed a space between the ship and the pier large enough for a cargo submarine to dock, and then be secluded when the floating gate was closed. The piling under the pier, and the piling to which the ship was moored, was electrically wired to an alarm bell in an office attached to the shed.

On 28 August 1916 the submarine Bremen left Bremerhaven on her maiden voyage. She was headed for a port on the East Coast of the United States, but never arrived. On 29 September a life jacket, stained with oil, was found at Maiden Cove on Cape Elizabeth, Maine. Stencilled on it was the word "Bremen", and printed on it were a small crown, with "Schutzmarke" above, and "V-Epping-Hoven, Willhelmshaven" below. The life jacket was smaller than those normally carried on steamships, and was said to be similar to those carried on submarines. Bremen never did reach port, and no other wreckage of her was ever found.

Willehad remained at New London, and her wireless was sealed in accordance with US neutrality regulations. On 25 October the British government claimed to have intercepted two letters from members of her crew to relatives in Germany, claiming that Willehad was to put to sea to operate as a wireless station for U-boats from within US territorial waters.

== Tender to Deutschland ==
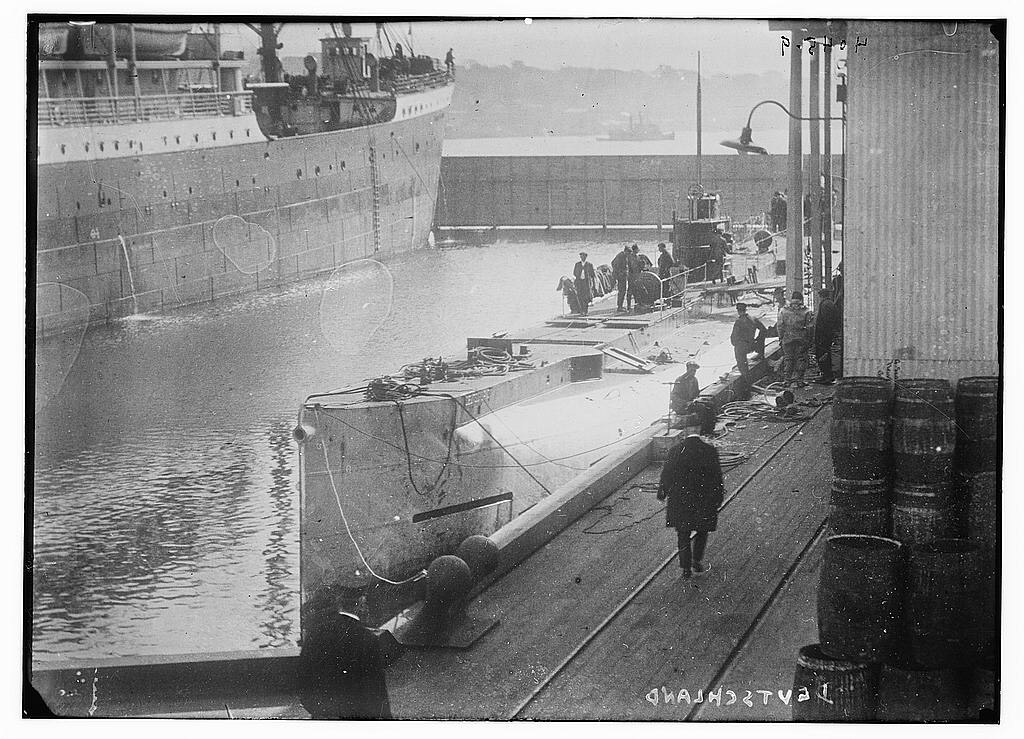
The Eastern Forwarding Company dock at New London. The quay is on the right, with Deutschland alongside it. Willehad's starboard side is on the left. In the background is the floating gate secluding the dock from view from the Thames River.

The submarine Deutschland left Bremen on 10 October, and reached New London early on the morning of 1 November. She docked between Willehad and the pier, and Deutschland's 25 crew moved into the best cabins aboard Willehad. Cargo worth $10 million was discharged from Deutschland to the shed: including synthetic dyes, pharmaceuticals, gems, and financial stocks and bonds. On Sunday 5 November Willehad hosted a Lutheran service for the submariners, led by a minister from Hartford, Connecticut.

On 8 November, 2,000 New London townspeople attended a reception at the Municipal Building for Deutschland's Master, Paul König, and his officers. After the reception, the New London Chamber of Commerce hosted a dinner for König; and for Captain Jachens of Willehad; seven members of their respective crews; and 300 guests. König was presented with a gold watch, engraved with the seal of New London.

EFC employed 60 African American stevedores to load Deutschland. They loaded a cargo estimated to be worth more than $2 million, comprising 360 tons of nickel; 180 tons of crude rubber; and bars of zinc and silver. The nickel was imported from Canada via a company in New Jersey; stored in the warehouse of another company in New York; and transported via a railroad yard in Baltimore.

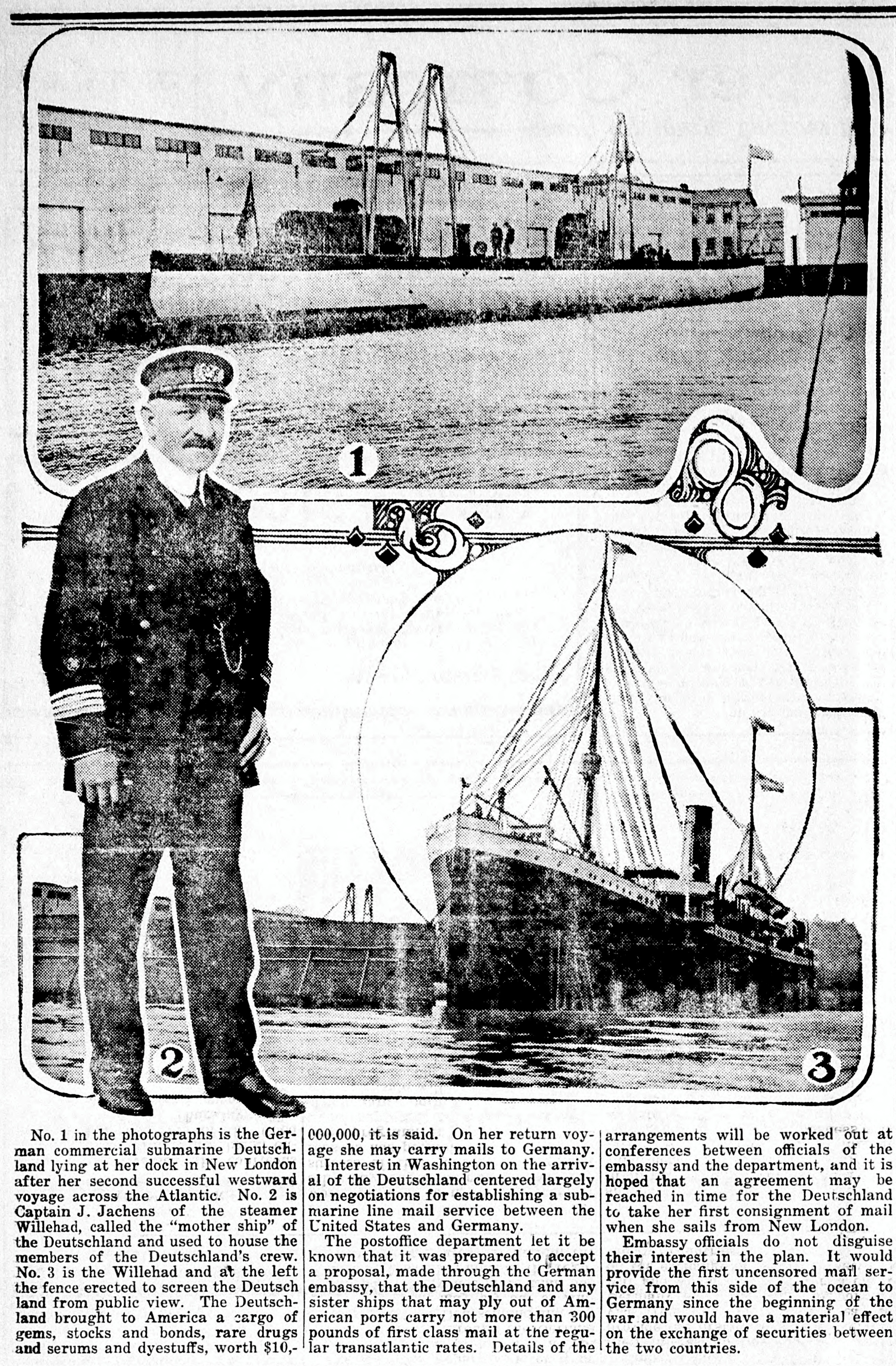
Newspaper photomontage showing (1) Deutschland in the Eastern Forwarding Company dock, (2) Willehad's Master, Captain J Jachens, and (3) Willehad, moored to form one side of the EFC dock

At 22:00 hrs on 16 November the lights on the EFC pier were switched off, and a launch from Willehad went down the harbor. Deutschland left her dock at 01:30 hrs on 17 November, and two tugs towed her down the harbor. A launch full of news reporters followed them. The flotilla passed the cruiser USS Columbia at 01:45 hrs. Columbia and several passenger ships pointed searchlights at Deutschland, and blew their whistles. However, one of the tugs, T. A. Scott, Jr., turned across the submarine's bow. Deutschland unintentionally rammed the tug; sinking her; and killing all five of the tug's crew. The only survivor was EFC's Captain Hinsch, who was a passenger. Deutschland's bow was damaged, so she returned to port for repairs.

The T.A. Scott Towing Company libelled the submarine for $12,000 for the loss of the tug, so Deutschland's crew had to leave the submarine. They were quartered aboard Willehad while the legal dispute was resolved. The families of the five tugboatmen killed also filed lawsuits. On 20 September enough of a legal agreement was reached between the parties for Deutschland to leave port, and her crew returned from Willehad to their submarine. On 21 November Deutschland left New London for Bremen; accompanied by Captain Hinsch aboard the T.A. Scott tug Alert, but this time in daylight.

Deutschland safely reached her home port in the Weser by 11 December. In January 1917 Willehad remained prepared for either Deutschland or another cargo submarine to visit New London. There was speculation about "a submersible, said to be larger than Deutschland", but no such craft existed. Nor did Deutschland return, as U-boat attacks on merchant ships caused relations between the US and Germany to deteriorate. In February 1917 the Imperial German Navy took Deutschland over and had her converted for combat as U-155.

On 3 February 1917 the US broke off diplomatic relations with Germany. On the same day, fire broke out on the State Pier in New London, where cargo was stored for Deutschland's expected return. On 6 February more cargo arrived at the State Pier, mostly copper and crude rubber. Also on 6 February, Bridgeport's Collector of Customs, James McGovern, announced that Willehad's crew would be removed and treated as immigrants. However, no such action was taken.

== Seizure ==
On 2 April 1917 the submarine USS D-1 came from New York to New London, and anchored near Willehaid to guard her and the State Pier. On 3 April, guards "from a United States warship" were deployed on the pier. Willehad's charter expired, and the EFC did not renew it, so control of her reverted to NDL.

On 6 April the US declared war on Germany, and ordered the seizure of all German ships in US-controlled ports. At 03:30 hrs on 6 April a force from the United States Coast Guard Academy in New London boarded Willehad. A captain, four lieutenants, 30 enlisted men, and 14 Coast Guard cadets took over the ship, and Collector McGovern requisitioned her. They caught Willehad's crew asleep, which prevented any of them from trying to scuttle her. Bureau of Immigration officers brought 36 members of Willehad's crew were brought ashore, leaving aboard one man who was too ill with rheumatism to travel. He was later taken off to hospital. The 36 were given breakfast in New London, and later the Immigration officers took them by Shore Line Express train to New York, on their way to Ellis Island. They were interned with the crews of other seized German ships in a camp at Mountain Park, North Carolina.

At first it was reported that Willehad's machinery was found undamaged. Later it was reported that they had sabotaged her, but "the damage inflicted on the machinery by the now interned crew is not as bad as at first imagined".

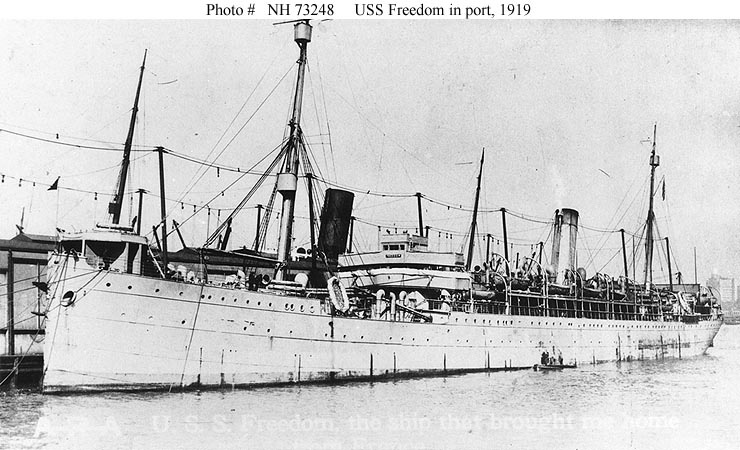
Willehad's sister ship Wittekind

A Californian, Harry S Bates, claimed that in October 1915 NDL had contracted to sell him Wittekind and Willehad for $900,000, but had refused to fulfil the contract. On 3 May 1917 he filed a suit at the United States District Court in Boston for possession of both ships. On 30 June President Woodrow Wilson issued an executive order authorising the USSB to take possession and title of 87 German ships, including Willehad.

On 8 May Willehad left New London, and on 25 May Collector McGovern auctioned perishable merchandise that had been removed from her before she left. Early in June it was reported that work to recondition and fit out Willehad and other seized ships "will go along steadily", and that she would be ready for US war service in July. However, on the evening of 29 August fire was discovered aboard her, when she was moored at "Army Pier 6" in Hoboken, which was part of the former HAPAG liner terminal. Eight Hoboken Fire Department companies turned out to fight the fire, and extinguished it within an hour. An investigation found the fire had started in oneof her cargo holds, where plumbers had been working, and one of them had carelessly used a blowtorch near a box of flammable supplies.

== Wyandotte ==
In 1918 the USSB renamed the ship Wyandotte. She was registered in New York, her US official number was 215297, and her code letters were LHMD. On 24 November that year she left Brest, France, and on 14 December she arrived in New York. On 23 February 1919 she left Bordeaux carrying men of the American Expeditionary Forces. One officer and 33 men were of Detachment C of Casual Company 33. Another officer and three men were a medical detachment. She arrived in New York on 12 March. On 7 August 1919 she arrived in Boston from New York. On 14 August she left Boston for London, England.

On 9 April 1920 Wyandotte was reported to have arrived in Vlissingen, the Netherlands, from New York. On 17 April she left Antwerp in ballast for the Black Diamond Steamship Company, and on 3 May she reached New York. Still under charter to Black Diamond, she left New York on 7 May and reached Philadelphia on 10 May. On 18 May she left Philadelphia, and on 3 June she reached Rotterdam. On 12 June she left Rotterdam for Wilmington, Delaware. On 21 August she left Savannah, Georgia. On 3 November she left Charleston, South Carolina.

Wyandotte was scrapped in Baltimore, starting on 31 March 1924.

== Bibliography ==
- Bonsor, NRP (1975). North Atlantic Seaway. Vol. 2. New York: Arco Publishing. ISBN 978-0668036795 – via TheShipsList.
- Drechsel, Edwin (1994). Norddeutscher Lloyd, Bremen, 1857–1970: History, Fleet, Ship Mails. Vancouver: Cordillera Publishing. ISBN 978-1-895590-08-1.
- Fifty-sixth Annual List of Merchant Vessels of the United States, for the Year ended June 30, 1924 (PDF). Washington, D.C.: Department of Commerce, Bureau of Navigation. 1924. p. 149 – via HyperWar.
- Kludas, Arnold (1983). Deutsche Ozean-Passagierschiffe 1850 bis 1895. Bibliothek der Schiffstypen (in German). Moers: Steiger-Verlag. ISBN 3-921564-64-6.
- Lloyd's Register British and Foreign of Shipping. Vol. I.–Steamers. London: Lloyd's Register of Shipping. 1896 – via Internet Archive.
- Lloyd's Register British and Foreign of Shipping. Vol. I.–Steamers. London: Lloyd's Register of Shipping. 1910 – via Internet Archive.
- Lloyd's Register of Shipping. Vol. II.–Steamers. London: Lloyd's Register of Shipping. 1919 – via Internet Archive.
- The Marconi Press Agency Ltd (1914). The Year Book of Wireless Telegraphy and Telephony. London: The Marconi Press Agency Ltd.
