= USS Pequot (ID-2998) =

German-built cargo steamship that served in the US Navy

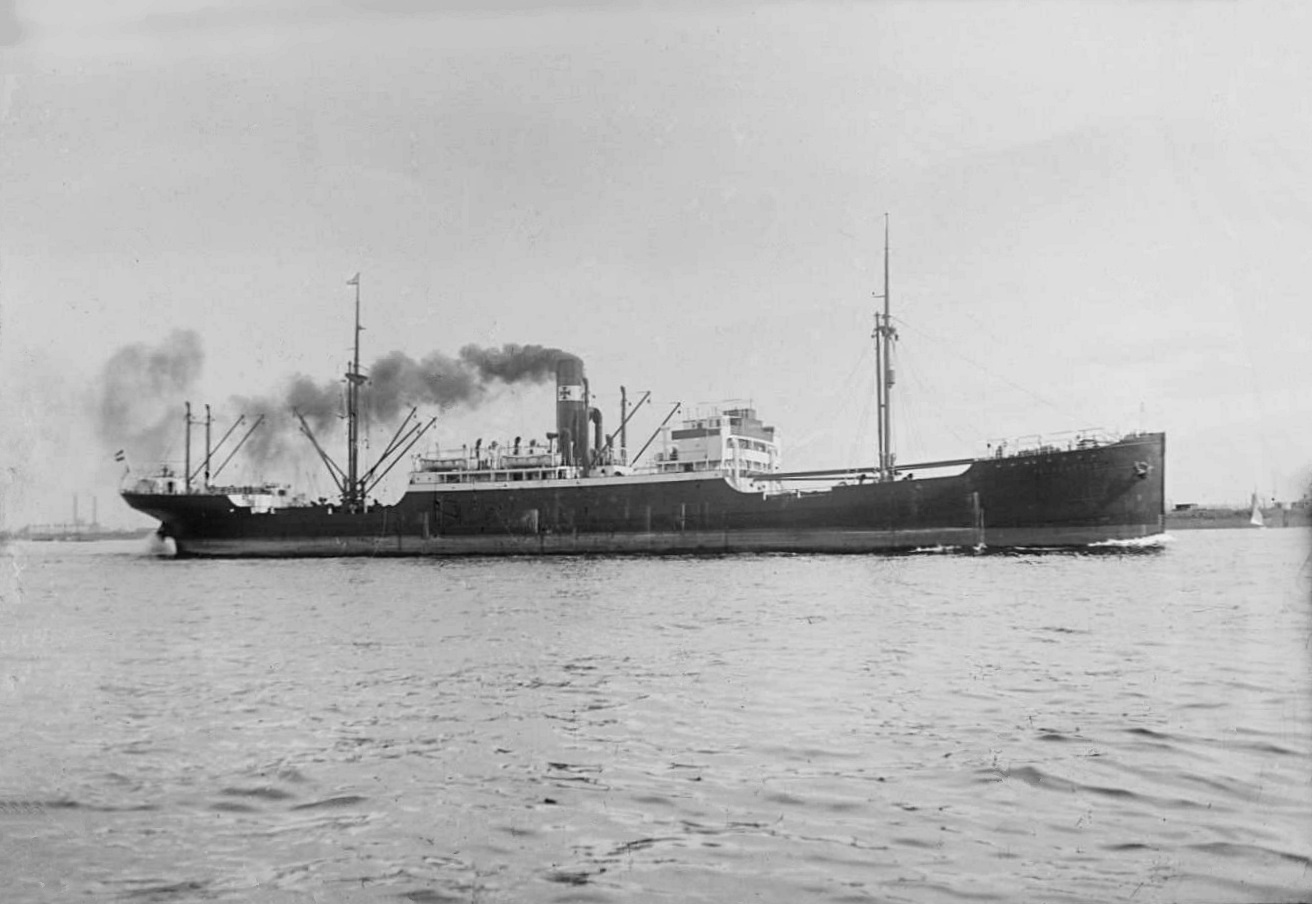
- The ship in DDG „Hansa“ livery

History
- Name: 1910: Ockenfels; 1918: Pequot; 1932: Argenfels
- Namesake: 1910: Ockenfels; 1918: Pequot; 1932: Schloss Arenfels
- Owner: 1910: DDG Hansa; 1917: US Shipping Board; 1923: California SS Co; 1923: DDG Hansa
- Operator: 1918: US Navy; 1920: Atlantic-Adriatic SS Corp
- Port of registry: 1910: (German Empire) Bremen; 1917: (United States) New York; 1923: Panama; 1923: (Weimar Republic) Bremen
- Builder: Joh. C. Tecklenborg, Geestemünde
- Yard number: 235
- Launched: 9 April 1910
- Completed: 28 May 1910
- Commissioned: into US Navy 28 October 1918
- Stricken: from US Navy 11 July 1919
- Identification: 1910: code letters QJTH; 1914: call sign DOC; 1917: US official number 215126; 1917: code letters LHFG; 1918: Naval Registry ID-2998; 1923: code letters QLSW
- Captured: 6 April 1917
- Fate: scrapped 1932

General characteristics
- Type: cargo ship
- Tonnage: 5,621 GRT, 3,542 NRT
- Displacement: 11,000 tons
- Length: 421.0 ft (128.3 m)
- Beam: 55.1 ft (16.8 m)
- Draft: 25 ft 2 in (7.67 m)
- Depth: 28.7 ft (8.7 m)
- Decks: 2
- Installed power: 517 NHP
- Propulsion: 1 × quadruple-expansion engine; 1 × screw
- Speed: 11 knots (20 km/h)
- Complement: 70 (in US Navy)
- Crew: 63 (in merchant service)
- Armament: 1917: 2 × 3-inch/50-caliber guns; 1918: 1 × 5-inch/40-caliber gun; 1 × 3-inch/50-caliber gun

USS Pequot (ID-2998) was a cargo steamship that was built in 1910 for DDG Hansa of Germany as Ockenfels. She was the second of three DDG Hansa ships to be named after Ockenfels in the Rhineland-Palatinate.

The US Government seized her in 1917, and renamed her Pequot in 1918. She served in the United States Navy for nine months from 1918 to 1919. She was the second ship to be named USS Pequot. The first USS Pequot was a gunboat in the American Civil War.

The United States Shipping Board (USSB) tried to sell Pequot in 1920, but the buyer went into receivership. The USSB succeeded in selling her in 1923, to a US company. DDG Hansa, her original owner, almost immediately chartered her, and then bought her back.

By then DDG Hansa already had a new Ockenfels, so it gave Pequot the name Argenfels. She was the second DDG Hansa ship to be named after Schloss Arenfels in the Rhineland-Palatinate. The first Argenfels had been built in 1901, seized by the French government in 1914, and had been renamed. The second Argenfels was scrapped in Germany in 1932.

== Building ==
Ockenfels was one of a class of eight sister ships built for DDG Hansa. The others were Birkenfels and Freienfels, launched in 1910; Kandelfels, Sturmfels and Huberfels, launched in 1912; and Lauterfels and Spitzfels, launched in 1913.

Joh. C. Tecklenborg in Geestemünde, Bremerhaven, built the ship as yard number 235. She was launched on 9 April 1910, and completed on 28 May. She had a four-cylinder quadruple-expansion engine that was rated at 517 NHP and gave her a speed of 11 knots (20 km/h). For handling cargo she had one 25-ton derrick, eight five-ton derricks and three three-ton derricks.

== Ockenfels with DDG Hansa ==
DDG Hansa registered Ockenfels at Bremen. Her code letters were QJTH. By 1914 she was equipped with wireless telegraphy. Her call sign was DOC.

Ockenfels sailed to ports including Hamburg, Newcastle upon Tyne, New York, and Durban in 1910; and Melbourne, Fremantle, Cape Town, and New York in 1912. In August 1913 Ockenfels' cargo included a collection of camels, donkeys, horses, and an elephant, all of which ran wild during a storm. The elephant died, reportedly of exposure. The ship arrived in Boston on 21 August.

In February 1914 Ockenfels brought a cargo of iron ore from Narvik in Norway to Philadelphia. Off the Grand Banks of Newfoundland she encountered snow, ice, and intense cold. Her crew of 58 lascars were reported to have deserted their posts, taken refuge in her engine room, and refused to emerge for four days. The ship's German officers kept her running with the help of the cooks and mess attendants. She reached Philadelphia on 27 February.

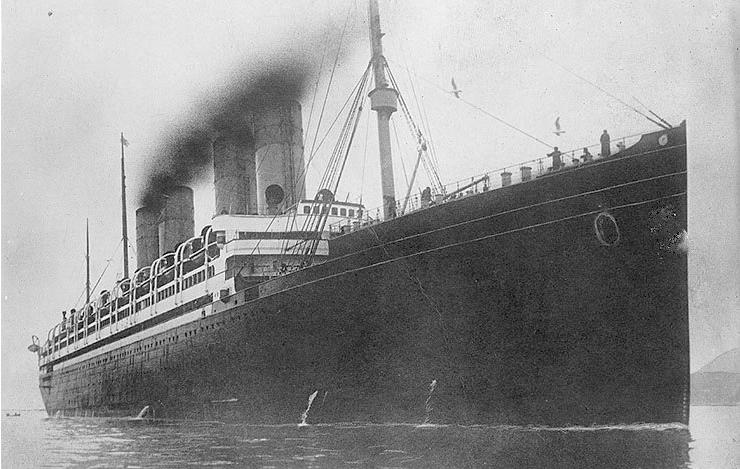
In November 1914 Kronprinzessin Cecilie moved from Bar Harbor, Maine and joined the other German ships in Boston

At the start of August 1914, the German government ordered all of its merchant ships to take refuge in the nearest German or neutral port. On 5 August Ockenfels reached Boston. She was joined by the Hamburg America Liners Amerika and Cincinnati; Norddeutscher Lloyd liner Kronprinzessin Cecilie and cargo liners Köln, Willehad, and Wittekind; and Austro-Hungarian steamship Erny. In order to save on port dues, the Central Powers ships moved to anchorages after discharging their cargo. They moved back into Boston Harbor for the winter of 1914–15, and then returned to their anchorages near Boston's quarantine station at the end of March 1915. The US Navy positioned the cruiser USS Brooklyn to keep all of the anchored ships under constant surveillance.

In 1915, events such as the Thrasher incident at the end of March and the Sinking of RMS Lusitania early in May increased tension between the US and Germany. At the end of May, US armed forces were ordered to fire upon any German or Austro-Hungarian ship that tried to leave a US port, and to sink her if she did not heave to.

== Ockenfels with the USSB ==
On 1 February 1917 Germany resumed unrestricted submarine warfare against the Entente Powers. On 3 February the US Government seized Kronprinzessin Cecilie, and on 4 February the US government ordered that the crews of all other Central Powers ships in US-controlled ports be confined to their ships. On 6 April 1917 the USA declared war on Germany, and seized German ships in US ports. An hour and a half after war was declared, Edmund Billings, Collector of the Port of Boston, used a force of 250 men from Boston Navy Yard, the United States Customs Service, and local police to take over the German ships in his port. Their German crews did not resist, and were removed to the immigration station. Amerika, Cincinnati, Köln, and Wittekind were in East Boston at the time. Ockenfels was on her own at a wharf in North End, Boston, with a skeleton crew of only 12 men, who were removed by a small detachment of US Navy men.

Federal officers found every German ship in Boston to have been sabotaged by its crew. "Aboard the Ockenfels, the gear leading to the propellers [sic], had been ripped up and every bit of machinery put out of commission". The damage included smashing a large hole in one cylinder of her engine. Repairs to Ockenfels' machinery were completed on 20 May, at a cost estimated at $50,000. A sea trial was scheduled for the next day. However, on 24 May fire broke out on the ship, and a timekeeper who was sleeping aboard suffered burns as he tried to fight the fire.

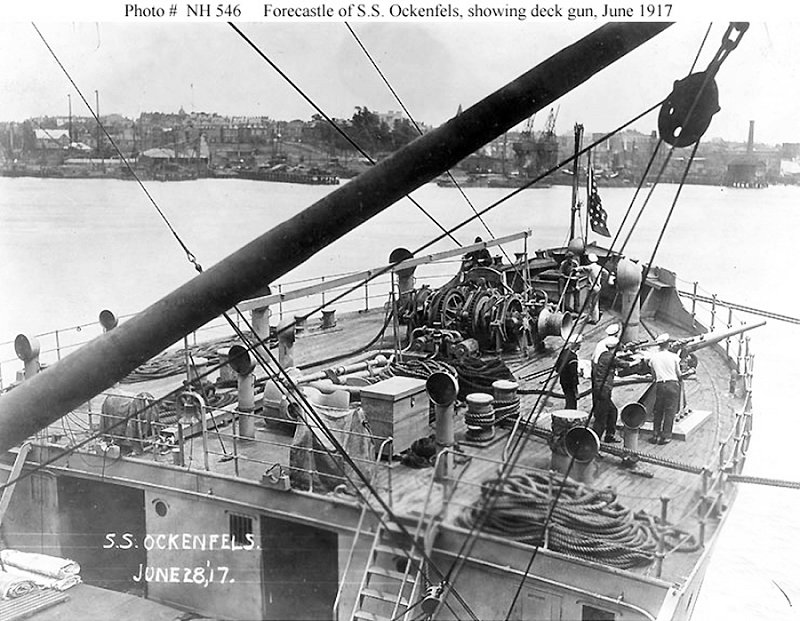
Ockenfels' fo'c's'le in June 1917, with a 3-inch/50-caliber gun mounted on her starboard bow

By 20 June 1917 Ockenfels had been defensively armed. It was reported that two 3-inch guns were fitted: one on her bow, and the other on her poop. She was fitted out at Chelsea, Massachusetts, and then loaded a cargo of iron and wheat to take to Europe. On 30 June President Woodrow Wilson issued an executive order authorising the USSB to take possession and title of 87 German ships, including Ockenfels. She was registered in New York. Her US official number was 215126 and her code letters were LHFG. On 31 July 1917 Ockenfels was reported to have "reached a French port in safety".

== Pequot ==
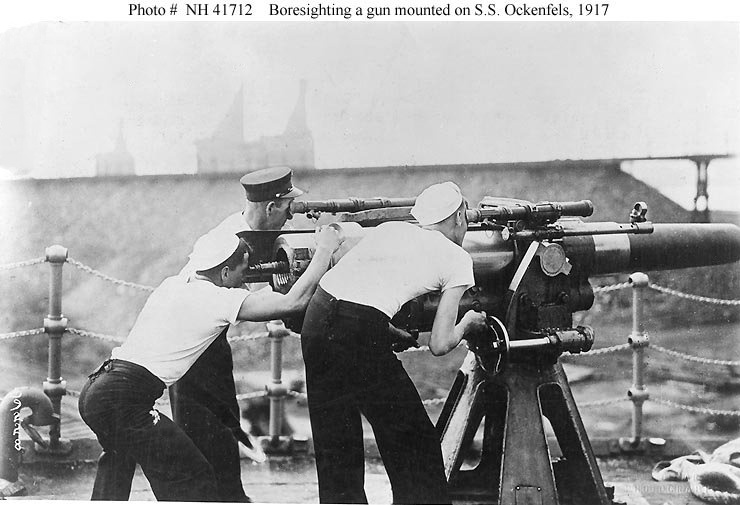
Boresighting the 3-inch/50-caliber gun on Ockenfels' fo'c's'le in 1917

By June 1918 Ockenfels had been renamed Pequot. On 24 June she left New York for France, but early in July she ran aground at Prospect, Nova Scotia, southwest of Halifax. She was refloated and safely brought into port, and returned to New York for repairs.

On 28 October 1918 Pequot was commissioned into the US Navy on a bareboat charter. Her Naval Registry Identification Number was ID-2998. Her commander was Lt Cdr John Decry, USNR. In Navy service her armament was one 5-inch/40-caliber gun and one 3-inch/50-caliber gun. She served in the Naval Overseas Transport Service on both the United States Army and USSB accounts. She was in Rotterdam, the Netherlands, on 23 February 1919, where a group photograph of her crew was taken. On 11 July 1919 she was struck from the Navy List and returned to the USSB.

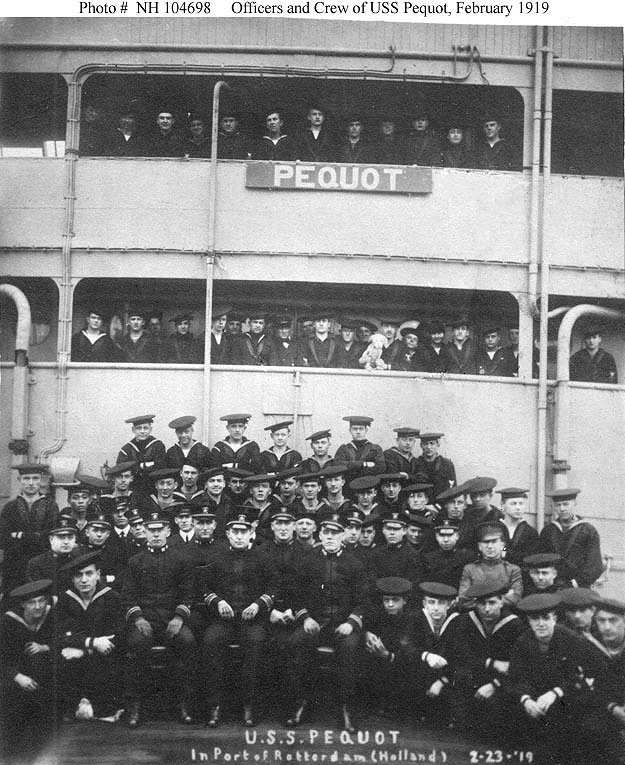
USS Pequot's crew in Rotterdam, 23 February 1919

After the First World War the USSB tried to sell its surplus ships. On 3 February 1920 it announced that it was selling Pequot to "Wymans Steamship Company" for $1,335,000. This may refer to the Atlantic-Adriatic Steamship Corporation, whose president was Benjamin Wyman Morse. Atlantic-Adriatic bought seven other ships from the USSB on what was called the "charter purchase plan". As well as Piquot it bought Andalusia, Arcadia, Englewood, Galesburg, Pawnee, and Pisa. Each ship was owned by a different one-ship company, and Atlantic-Adriatic managed them. Atlantic-Adriatic was to pay the USSB for the ships in instalments of ten percent.

However, there was too little demand for transatlantic freight, and this caused rates to fall from $19 per ton to $16 per ton. Marsh & McLennan sued Atlantic-Adriatic for $27,325 owed on shipping insurance, and on 17 November 1920 Atlantic-Adriatic went into receivership with debts estimated at $1.5 million. BW Morse was one of the sons of fraudster Charles W. Morse. However, the USSB stated that "there is no criticism of B.W. Morse's administration of this company, so far as the facts are now developed".

In 1923 the California Steamship Company bought Pequot, registered her in Panama, and almost immediately chartered her to DDG Hansa.

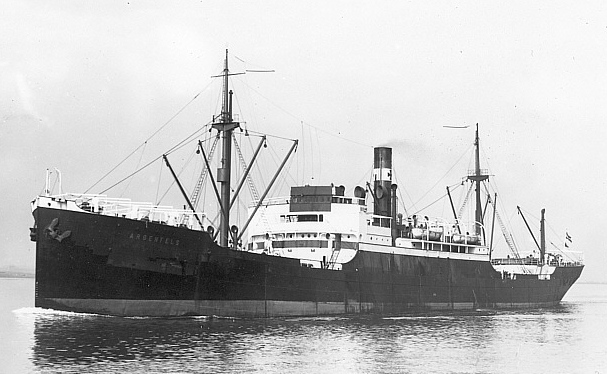
The ship as Argenfels in 1924

== Argenfels ==
On 28 June 1923 Pequot was in Cardiff, Wales when DDG Hansa bought her back. By then DDG Hansa had a new Ockenfels, which had been built in 1921, so Pequot was renamed Argenfels. DDG Hansa registered her in Hamburg. Her code letters were QLSW. Blohm+Voss in Hamburg scrapped her in December 1932.

== Bibliography ==
- Fiftieth Annual List of Merchant Vessels of the United States, for the Year ended June 30, 1918 (PDF). Washington, D.C.: Department of Commerce, Bureau of Navigation. 1919. p. 149 – via HyperWar.
- Gray, Leonard (1967). Deutsche Dampfschifffahrts-Gesellschaft "Hansa"; 85 Years of Shipping Under the Maltese Cross. Kendal: World Ship Society.
- Lloyd's Register of British and Foreign Shipping. Vol. I.–Steamers. London: Lloyd's Register of Shipping. 1911 – via Internet Archive.
- Lloyd's Register of Shipping. Vol. II.–Steamers. London: Lloyd's Register of Shipping. 1917 – via Internet Archive.
- Lloyd's Register of Shipping. Vol. II.–Steamers. London: Lloyd's Register of Shipping. 1919 – via Internet Archive.
- Lloyd's Register of Shipping. Vol. II.–Steamers and Motor Vessels. London: Lloyd's Register of Shipping. 1923 – via Internet Archive.
- Lloyd's Register of Shipping. Vol. II.–Steamers and Motorships. London: Lloyd's Register of Shipping. 1924 – via Internet Archive.
- The Marconi Press Agency Ltd (1914). The Year Book of Wireless Telegraphy and Telephony. London: The Marconi Press Agency Ltd.
