= USS Freedom (ID-3024) =

Cargo and transport ship in the United States Navy in World War I

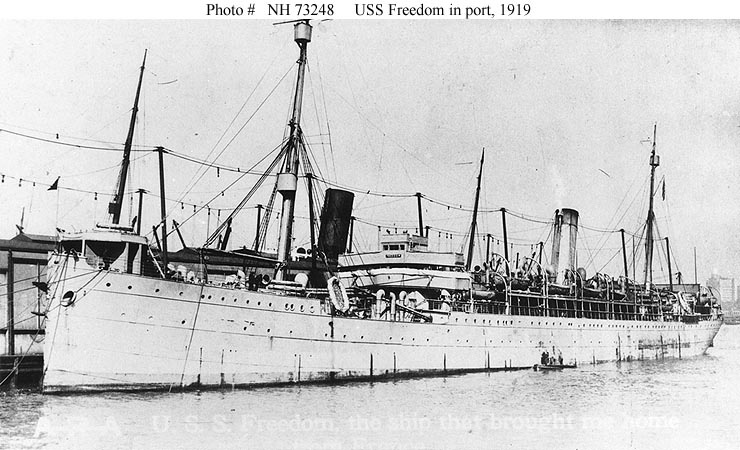
- USS Freedom (ID-3024), c. 1919

History

Germany
- Name: Wittekind
- Namesake: Wittekind (c. 730–808), Duke of Saxony
- Owner: North German Lloyd
- Builder: Blohm & Voss, Hamburg
- Launched: 3 February 1894
- Maiden voyage: Bremen–Hoboken, New Jersey, 14 April 1894
- In service: 1894
- Refit: lengthened in 1900
- Out of service: 8 August 1914
- Fate: Seized by the United States, 6 April 1917

History

United States
- Name: USAT Iroquois
- Acquired: 1917
- In service: 1917
- Renamed: Freedom, 1918
- Out of service: 1919

History

United States
- Name: USS Freedom (ID-3024)
- Acquired: 24 January 1919
- Commissioned: 24 January 1919
- Decommissioned: 23 September 1919

General characteristics
- Tonnage: 4,997 gross register tons (GRT)
- Length: 124.69 m (409 ft 1 in)
- Beam: 14.03 m (46 ft 0 in)
- Propulsion: Triple expansion steam engine; 2,500 hp (1,900 kW); twin screw
- Speed: 12 knots (22 km/h; 14 mph)
- Capacity: Passengers: 105 second class; 1,009 steerage
- Crew: 70

After lengthening (1900):
- Tonnage: 5,640 GRT
- Length: 140.51 m (461 ft 0 in)
- Capacity: Passengers: 177 second class; 1,039 steerage

Differences as USS Freedom:
- Displacement: 9,674 tons
- Length: 383 ft 5 in (116.87 m) (between perpendiculars)
- Beam: 46 ft 4 in (14.12 m)
- Draft: 24 ft 11 in (7.59 m)
- Complement: 60
- Armament: 2 × 4-inch (102 mm) guns

USS Freedom (ID-3024) was a cargo and transport ship in the United States Navy in World War I. Originally Wittekind for the North German Lloyd line, the ship also served as USAT Iroquois and USAT Freedom after being seized by the United States in 1917.

Wittekind was built in Germany for the Bremen – New York service of the Roland Line service of North German Lloyd, and was the sister ship of Willehad. In March 1900 Wittekind was lengthened because her cargo capacity was found lacking. Later that same year, Wittekind was among the first transports to carry German Empire troops as part of the Eight-Nation Alliance intended to put down the Boxer Rebellion in China. In August 1914, at the start of World War I, the ship was interned at Boston in the neutral United States.

When the US entered the war in April 1917, Wittekind was seized and turned over to the United States Shipping Board. Renamed Iroquois, the ship was chartered to the United States Army as a cargo ship after a refit, and, in 1918, was renamed Freedom. In January 1919 the ship was commissioned into the United States Navy, and carried almost 5,000 troops home from Europe before her decommissioning in September. Held in reserve for transport duty, the ship was laid up for five years before being scrapped in 1924.

== Wittekind ==
Wittekind was built by Blohm & Voss of Hamburg for North German Lloyd's Roland Line, which was a fortnightly steerage and freight service between Bremen and New York. Launched on 3 February 1894, Wittekind—named for Wittekind (c. 730–808), the Duke of Saxony — and sister ship Willehad were the first twin-screw steamers expressly built for North German Lloyd. The new liner sailed on her maiden voyage to Hoboken, New Jersey on 14 April.

Wittekind and sister ship Willehad were both quickly found to be deficient in cargo space, and plans were made to lengthen both vessels (though Willehad was never lengthened). Wittekind 's bridge was moved forward and a cargo hatch was installed behind it. After this, the ship was cut into two parts forward of the bridge's new position, and a new 18.29-meter (60.0 ft) section was inserted, which greatly increased the cargo capacity. Sources disagree as to where the procedure was performed with one reporting it was performed at the Seebeck Yard in Germany, while another claims it was done by Tyne Pontoons & Drydock Co., at Newcastle. Wherever the work was performed, it was completed by March 1900.

On 3 July 1900, Wittekind sailed from Bremerhaven with Frankfurt as the initial transport ships to depart with troops of Germany's contribution to the Eight-Nation Alliance intended to put down the Boxer Rebellion in China. Wittekind remained in naval service as a transport and hospital ship through late October 1901. After her naval service ended, Wittekind sailed variously to Baltimore, Maryland; Galveston, Texas; Montreal; and ports in South America through mid-1914.

At sea and headed for Montreal when the United Kingdom declared war on the German Empire, Wittekind instead headed for Boston and safety in the then-neutral United States. The steamer—carrying a cargo of lead and coal tar products reportedly worth $1,000,000—slipped past British cruiser Essex in a dense fog near Sable Island. Wittekind 's wireless operator calculated that the ship passed fewer than 10 nautical miles (19 km) from Essex. The steamer was interned by the US and her Canadian-bound passengers—18 cabin-, and 305 steerage-class who were not allowed to remain in the United States—were greeted by the Canadian Commissioner of Immigration who was stationed at Boston.

Wittekind was joined in Boston by sister ship Willehad; North German Lloyd line-mates Kronprinzessin Cecilie and Köln; the Hamburg America Line steamers Amerika and Cincinnati; and Hansa Line freighter Ockenfels. In March 1916, all except Kronprinzessin Cecilie and Ockenfels were moved from their waterfront piers to an anchorage across the harbor from the Boston Navy Yard. Daily "neutrality duty" by United States Coast Guard harbor tug Winnisimmet kept a watchful eye on the ships. Many crew members of the ships eventually went ashore, were processed through immigration, and found employment, while a contingent of musicians from the vessels toured New England, frequently playing at department stores and restaurants, and drawing the ire of the local musicians' union.

After the US declared war on Germany, Wittekind and the other interned ships were seized on 6 April 1917 and handed over to the United States Shipping Board (USSB).

== United States service in World War I ==
After her seizure and refitting, the former liner was chartered to the United States Army as USAT Iroquois. In 1918, her name was again changed, this time to Freedom. On 24 January 1919, Freedom was acquired by the United States Navy and commissioned the same day.

Freedom was assigned to the Cruiser and Transport Force, and after overhaul at New York, sailed on a voyage to Saint-Nazaire, France, and embarked troops for return to the United States. The cargo ship made two more voyages to France, each to Brest, with a visit to Norfolk, Virginia, between trips. She returned a total of 4,983 troops on her voyages from France.

She arrived at Hoboken on 5 September 1919 and was assigned to duty in the 3rd Naval District. Freedom was decommissioned at New York on 23 September and returned to the USSB the same day. The veteran ship was transferred to the United States Army transport reserve, and was laid up for five years. On 24 February 1924, Freedom arrived at Baltimore for scrapping.
