= USS Covington (ID-1409) =

United States transport ship

Coordinates: 47°24′N 07°44′W

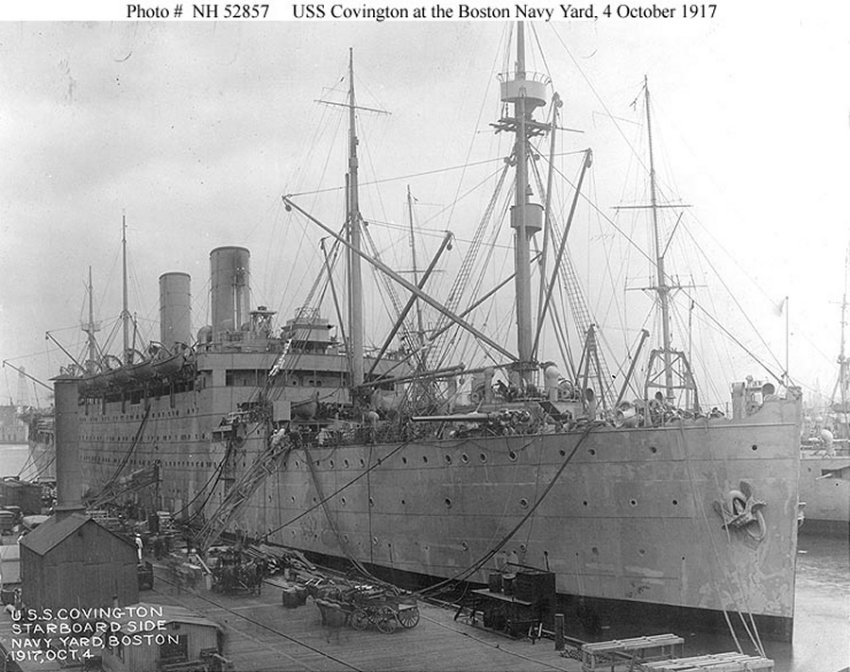
- USS Covington at Boston Navy Yard

History
- Name: 1908: Cincinnati; 1917: Covington
- Namesake: 1908: Cincinnati; 1917: Covington, Kentucky
- Owner: 1908: HAPAG; 1917: US Shipping Board
- Port of registry: 1908: (German Empire) Hamburg; 1917: (United States)
- Route: 1909: Hamburg – Cherbourg – New York; 1910: Genoa – Naples – New York; 1914: Hamburg – Boulogne – Southampton – Boston
- Builder: F. Schichau, Danzig
- Launched: 24 July 1908
- Acquired: 26 July 1917
- Commissioned: 28 July 1917
- Maiden voyage: 27 May 1909
- Identification: 1913: wireless call sign DDC; 1917: ID-1408
- Fate: Torpedoed on 1 July 1918, sank under tow the next day

General characteristics
- Tonnage: 16,339 GRT, 9,733 NRT
- Length: 183.9 m (603 ft 4 in)
- Beam: 19.9 m (65 ft 3 in)
- Propulsion: as built: 2 × screws, 2 × quadruple expansion engines
- Speed: 16 knots (30 km/h; 18 mph)
- Capacity: passengers, 1908: 246 first class; 332 second class; 448 third class; 1,801 steerage
- Crew: as troopship: 776
- Armament: 4 × 6-inch (150 mm) guns
- Notes: sister ship: Cleveland

USS Covington (ID-1409) was a German transatlantic ocean liner that was launched in 1908 for the Hamburg America Line (HAPAG) as Cincinnati. In 1917 the United States seized her, had her converted into a troop ship and renamed her Covington. In 1918 U-86 torpedoed her, killing six of her complement. Three tugboats towed her about one third of the way to Brest, France, but she sank the afternoon of 2 July 1918.

== Building and peacetime career ==
F Schichau built Cincinnati at Danzig, launching her on 24 July 1908. Two months later she was joined by a sister ship, Cleveland, built by Blohm & Voss in Hamburg.

Cincinnati was 183.9 m (603 ft 4 in) long and her beam was 19.9 m (65 ft 3 in). Her tonnages were 16,339 gross register tons (GRT) and 9,733 net register tons (NRT). She had berths for 2,827 passengers: 246 first class, 332 second class, 448 third class and 1,801 steerage.

Cincinnati had twin screws, each driven by a quadruple expansion steam engine. They gave her a speed of 16 knots (30 km/h; 18 mph).

Cincinnati began her maiden voyage from Hamburg via Cherbourg to New York on 27 May 1909. From 4 April 1910 until 2 April 1913 her route was Genoa – Naples – New York.

By 1913 Cincinnati was equipped for wireless telegraphy. Her call sign was DDC.

== First World War ==
On 28 July 1914, the day the First World War began, Cincinnati left Hamburg for Port of Boston via Boulogne and Southampton. At Boston the United States Customs Service interned her along with the HAPAG liner Amerika, Norddeutscher Lloyd liners Kronprinzessin Cecilie, Köln, Wittekind and Willehad and DDG Hansa cargo ship Ockenfels.

In March 1916 Cincinnati, Amerika, Köln, Wittekind and Willehad moved from their waterfront piers to an anchorage across the harbor from Boston Navy Yard. Daily "neutrality duty" by United States Coast Guard harbor tug Winnisimmet kept the ships under observation. Many members of their crews eventually went ashore, were processed through immigration, and found employment, while a contingent of musicians from the vessels toured New England, frequently playing at department stores and restaurants, and drawing the ire of the local musicians' union.

On 6 April 1917 the United States declared war on Germany. The US authorities seized the German ships and vested them in the United States Shipping Board. On 26 July Cincinnati was transferred to the United States Navy, and two days later she was commissioned as USS Covington, named after Covington, Kentucky.

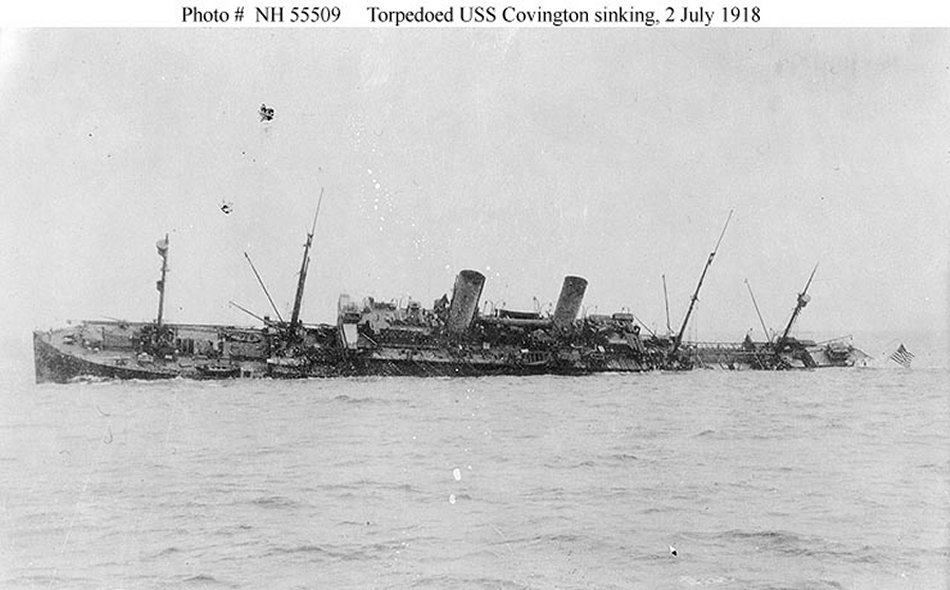
USS Covington sinking off Brest

From 18 October 1917, Covington made six voyages from Hoboken, New Jersey, to Brest, France, taking more than 21,000 troops for service with the American Expeditionary Force. On 1 July 1918 U-86 torpedoed her off Brest. Six of her crew were killed, but her escorts rescued 770. Covington remained afloat, and was towed about 50 miles (80 km) toward Brest, but sank the afternoon of 2 July 1918.

== Bibliography ==
- Drechsel, Edwin (1994). Norddeutscher Lloyd, Bremen, 1857–1970: History, Fleet, Ship Mails. Vancouver, BC: Cordillera Publishing. ISBN 978-1-895590-08-1. OCLC 30357825.
- The Marconi Press Agency Ltd (1913). The Year Book of Wireless Telegraphy and Telephony. London: The St Katherine Press.
