= SS Pisa =

German-built cargo ship

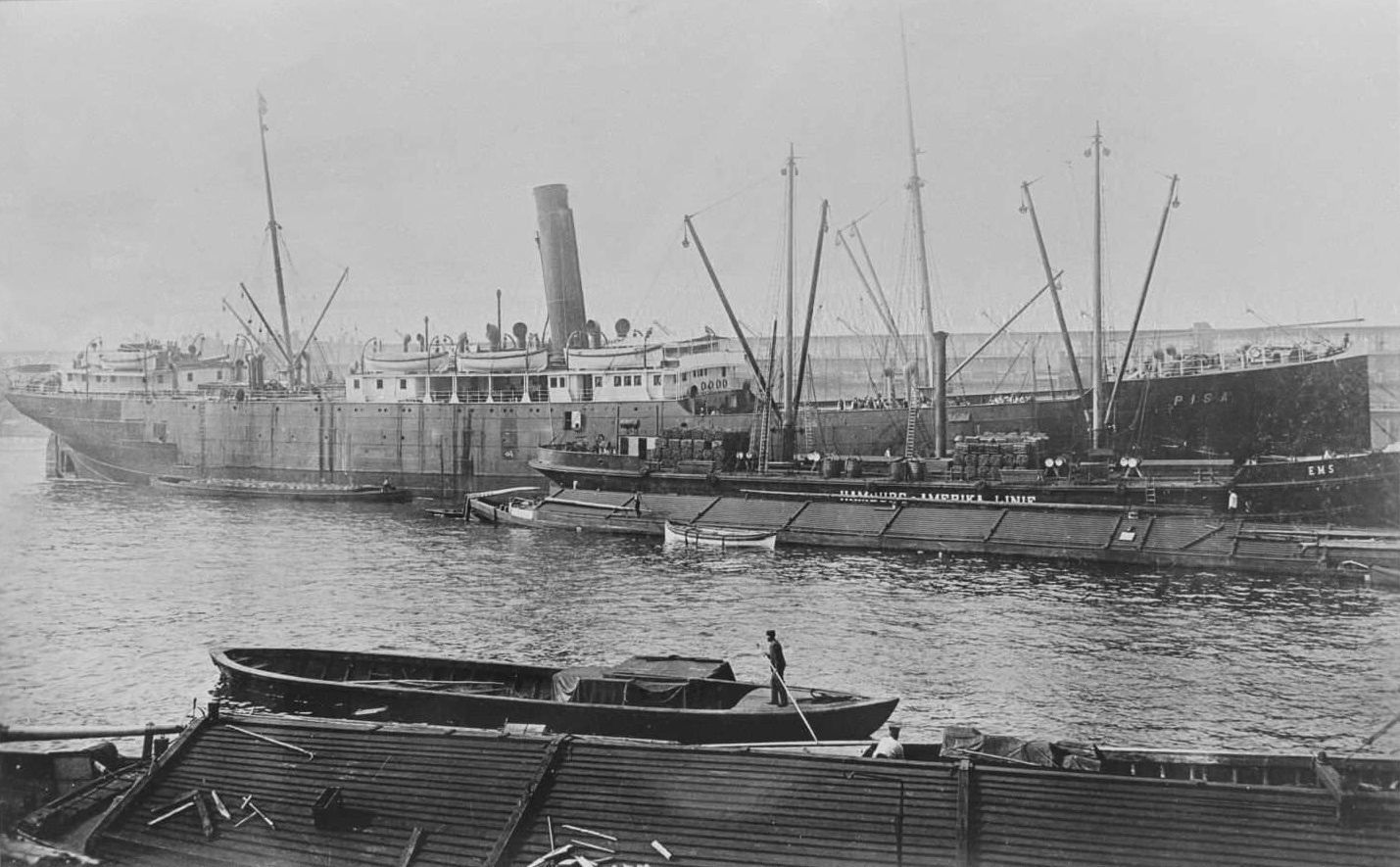
- Pisa between 1901 and 1914

History
- Name: 1896: Pisa; 1917: Ascutney
- Namesake: 1896: Pisa; 1917: Mount Ascutney
- Owner: 1896: Rob. M. Sloman; 1903: Dampfschiffsrhederei "Union"; 1907: Hamburg America Line; 1917: US Shipping Board
- Operator: 1920: Atlantic-Adriatic SS Corp
- Port of registry: 1896: (German Empire) Hamburg; 1917: (United States) New York
- Route: 1896: Hamburg – New York; 1911: Hamburg – Montreal; 1913: Hamburg – New York
- Builder: A Stephen & Sons, Govan
- Yard number: 369
- Launched: 24 November 1896
- Completed: December 1896
- Maiden voyage: 20 May 1897
- Out of service: probably October 1921 onward
- Identification: 1897: code letters RKPV; by 1913: call sign DDF; 1917: US official number 215056; 1917: code letters LHCS
- Fate: scrapped February 1924

General characteristics
- Type: cargo liner
- Tonnage: 1897: 4,446 GRT, 2,895 NRT; 1903: 4,959 GRT, 3,245 NRT
- Length: 390 ft (119 m)
- Beam: 46.2 ft (14.1 m)
- Depth: 27.7 ft (8.4 m)
- Decks: 2
- Installed power: 538 NHP
- Propulsion: 1 × triple-expansion engine; 1 × screw
- Speed: 10 1/2 to 12 knots (19 to 22 km/h)
- Capacity: passengers: 40 × 1st class; 1,200 × 3rd class
- Sensors & processing systems: by 1910: submarine signalling

SS Pisa was a cargo and passenger steamship that was built in Scotland in 1896. She was in German ownership until 1917, when the United States seized her and renamed her Ascutney.

Pisa ran scheduled transatlantic passenger services; first for Rob. M. Sloman; then for Dampfschiffsrhederei "Union"; and finally for Hamburg America Line (HAPAG). From 1897 until 1914 she ran mostly between Hamburg and New York. From 1911 to 1913 she ran between Hamburg and Montreal instead. In 1905 she was briefly a Japanese troopship in the Russo-Japanese War.

The United States Shipping Board (USSB) owned Ascutney from 1917 onward. She was purely a cargo ship. In 1918 she took American Red Cross supplies to northern Russia in the Russian Civil War. From 1920 she was in tramp trade, sailing between ports on the East Coast of the United States, Gulf Coast of the United States, Chile, and Italy. She seems to have been laid up after September 1921. She was scrapped in 1924.

== Building ==
Alexander Stephen and Sons in Govan, Glasgow built the ship as yard number 369. She was launched on 24 November 1896 as Pisa for the Rob. M. Sloman company, and completed that December. Her registered length was 390 ft (119 m), her beam was 46.2 ft (14.1 m), and her depth was 27.7 ft (8.4 m). She had berths for 40 passengers in first class and 1,200 in third class. As built, her tonnages were assessed as 4,446 GRT and 2,895 NRT. She had a single screw, driven by a three-cylinder triple-expansion engine that was rated at 538 NHP and gave her a speed of 10 1/2 to 12 knots (19 to 22 km/h).

== Pisa ==
Sloman registered Pisa at Hamburg. Her code letters were RKPV. On 20 May 1897 she left Hamburg on her maiden voyage, which was to New York.

In March 1903 Pisa reported seeing a steamship sink on 16 February in a heavy sea at position 49°46′N 12°43′W, 100 nautical miles (190 km) southwest of Fastnet. Pisa sighted the ship several miles to port, apparently flying an international flag distress signal. Pisa changed course to assist, and then at a distance of about 2 nautical miles (4 km) saw the steamship with her stern submerged and her bow in the air. At a distance of about 1 nautical mile (1.9 km) Pisa's crew saw the ship sink. Pisa reached where the ship sank, and searched the area, but found neither survivors nor wreckage.

Later in 1903 Pisa's ownership was transferred to Dampfschiffsrhederei "Union" AG, which was associated with Sloman. Her tonnages were reassessed as 4,959 GRT and 3,245 NRT. HAPAG chartered her, keeping her on the same route between Hamburg and New York. She began her first voyage for HAPAG on 4 November 1903. In 1904 Pisa made one round trip between Odesa and New York, via Istanbul, Smyrna (now İzmir), and Piraeus, starting on 5 January. She reverted to her route between Hamburg and New York on 14 February.

In the Russo-Japanese War Japan chartered Pisa as a troopship. She survived the Battle of Tsushima in May 1905, returned to Yokohama, and was returned to her owners a few days later.

On 9 January 1907 HAPAG bought Pisa. On 4 May she landed a full load of 1,199 immigrants at Ellis Island.

By 1910 Pisa was equipped with wireless telegraphy and submarine signalling. In the winter of 1910–1911 Pisa sailed to Buenos Aires in Argentina. On her return voyage she grounded on 21 January in Lyme Bay in south West England. She was towed off the same day, and continued to Hamburg.

From 14 April 1911 Pisa's route was between Hamburg and Montreal via Quebec. On 1 April 1912 she left Hamburg for a westbound crossing on this route. On 14 April at position 42°06′N 49°43′E she sighted "extensive field ice, and... seven bergs of considerable sizes on both sides of track". The United States Hydrographic Office received a copy of her report the next day. Meanwhile, some distance south and east of that position, RMS Titanic struck an iceberg and sank. On 17 April Pisa called at St. John's, Newfoundland.

By 1913 Pisa's wireless call sign was DDF. On 29 August 1913 she left Hamburg for Montreal for the last time.

In April 1914 HAPAG began a service between Odesa and New York via Batumi, Istanbul, Smyrna, and Piraeus. On 11 April Pisa sailed from Hamburg for New York to join the new route. On 22 June she left Batum, and on 22 July she reached New York. On 1 August 1914, with the First World War imminent, HAPAG announced the suspension of its shipping services. Pisa was one of 11 HAPAG ships that took shelter in New York.

=== Laid up in New York ===
At the end of March 1915, Pisa loaded provisions and bunkered. HAPAG claimed that the coal was for her donkey engine, heating, and galley. However, longshoremen said she had loaded "all the coal she could carry", and had signed on a full crew. The Collector of the Port of New York, Dudley Field Malone, sent United States Customs Service officers to keep her under close watch. On 11 March SMS Prinz Eitel Friedrich had arrived in Newport News, Virginia, low on coal and with her boilers needing to be serviced. At first it was suspected that Prinz Eitel Friedrich might try to return to sea, and Pisa would try to meet her at sea to resupply her. However, Malone doubted that Pisa would try to get past the torpedo boat destroyers at Hoffman Island quarantine station.

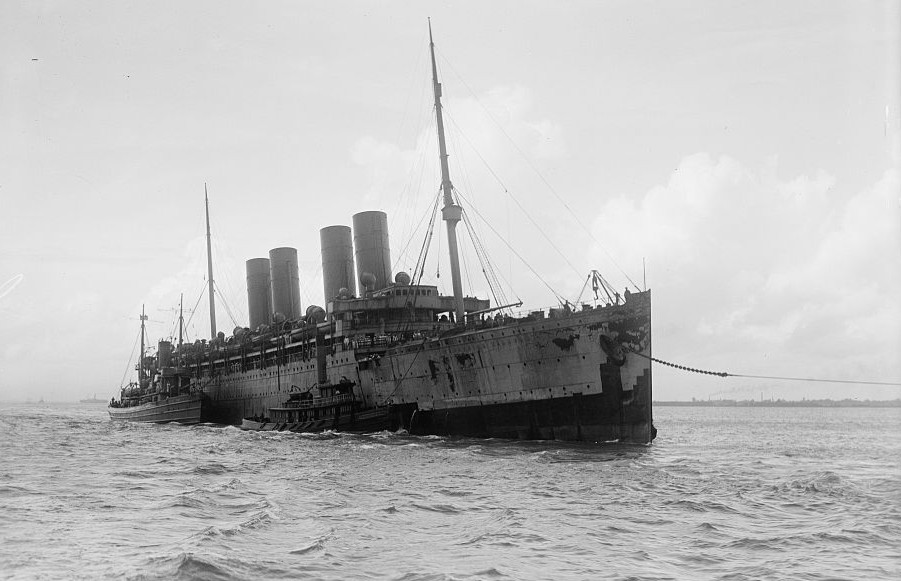
Kronprinz Wilhelm interned in 1916

Pisa remained at her berth at 33rd Street, South Brooklyn. On 11 April SMS Kronprinz Wilhelm entered Newport News and was interned. Like Prinz Eitel Friedrich, she was low on coal, and her crew was beginning to suffer malnutrition. The Imperial German Navy may have intended Pisa to try to supply Kronprinz Wilhelm.

In May 1915 Malone sent 70 customs inspectors and four Acting Deputy Surveyors aboard the revenue cutters USCGC Guide and Hudson to search all German and Austro-Hungarian ships in New York Harbor for explosives. On 12 May they searched HAPAG and Norddeutscher Lloyd ships at Hoboken, New Jersey. They were expected to search ships in South Brooklyn, including Pisa, the next day. The US Government feared that were war to begin between the US and the Central Powers, the crews would try to sabotage their ships to try to make them useless to the US.

On 1 February 1917 Germany resumed unrestricted submarine warfare against the Entente Powers. On 4 February the US government ordered that the crews of Central Powers ships in US-controlled ports be confined to their ships.

== Ascutney ==
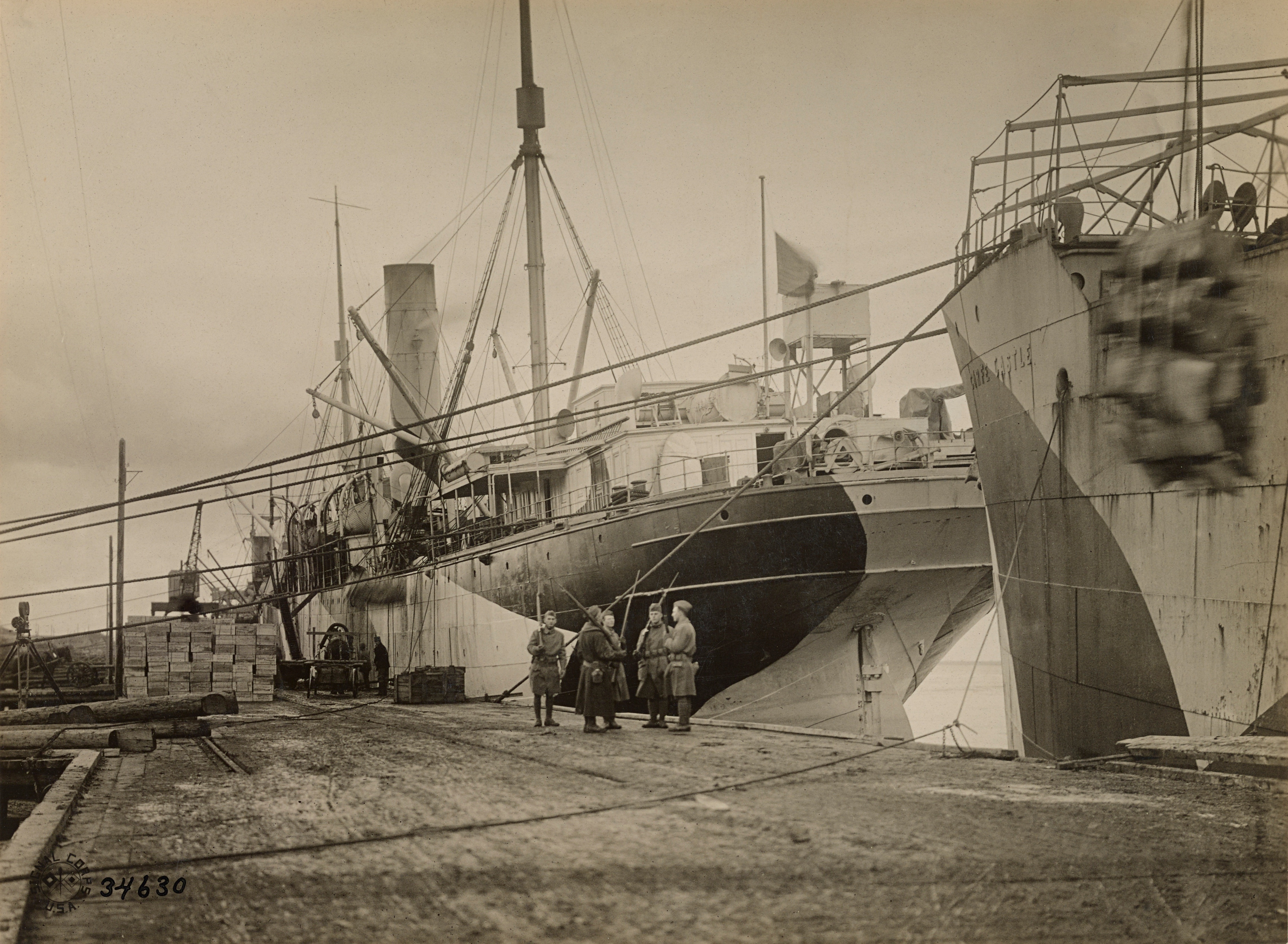
Ascutney in Archangel in October 1918

On 6 April 1917 the USA declared war on Germany, and seized German ships in US ports. On 30 June President Woodrow Wilson issued an executive order authorising the USSB to take possession and title of 87 German ships, including Pisa. She was renamed Ascutney and registered in New York. Her US official number was 215056 and her code letters were LHCS.

On 25 or 26 August 1918 Ascutney left New York as an American Red Cross supply ship, carrying 4,600 tons of food, pharmaceuticals, soap, and other supplies for US troops taking part in the North Russia intervention in the Russian Civil War. She called at Murmansk, and reached Archangel in late September. In Archangel she loaded cargo including 2,000 tons of flax, and three polar bear cubs. On 15 November she left Archangel, and on 1 December 1918 she arrived back in New York.

In the first half of 1919 Ascutney sailed to the Mediterranean. She left Gibraltar on 1 May, and was due back in New York on 17 May. On 23 September she left Philadelphia for Saint-Nazaire, France. She left St-Nazaire on 25 October, called at Nantes, and left there on 4 November. She called at Faial, left there on 24 November, and was due in New York on 4 December.

On 5 January 1920 Ascutney left Portland, Maine for Genoa, Italy, where she arrived on 23 January. By March she was back in New York. In a gale on 6 March Ascutney and another USSB steamship, Costilla, dragged their anchors near Liberty Island and collided with each other. Neither ship was seriously damaged, and tugboats towed both ships to safety.

=== Atlantic-Adriatic Steamship Corporation ===
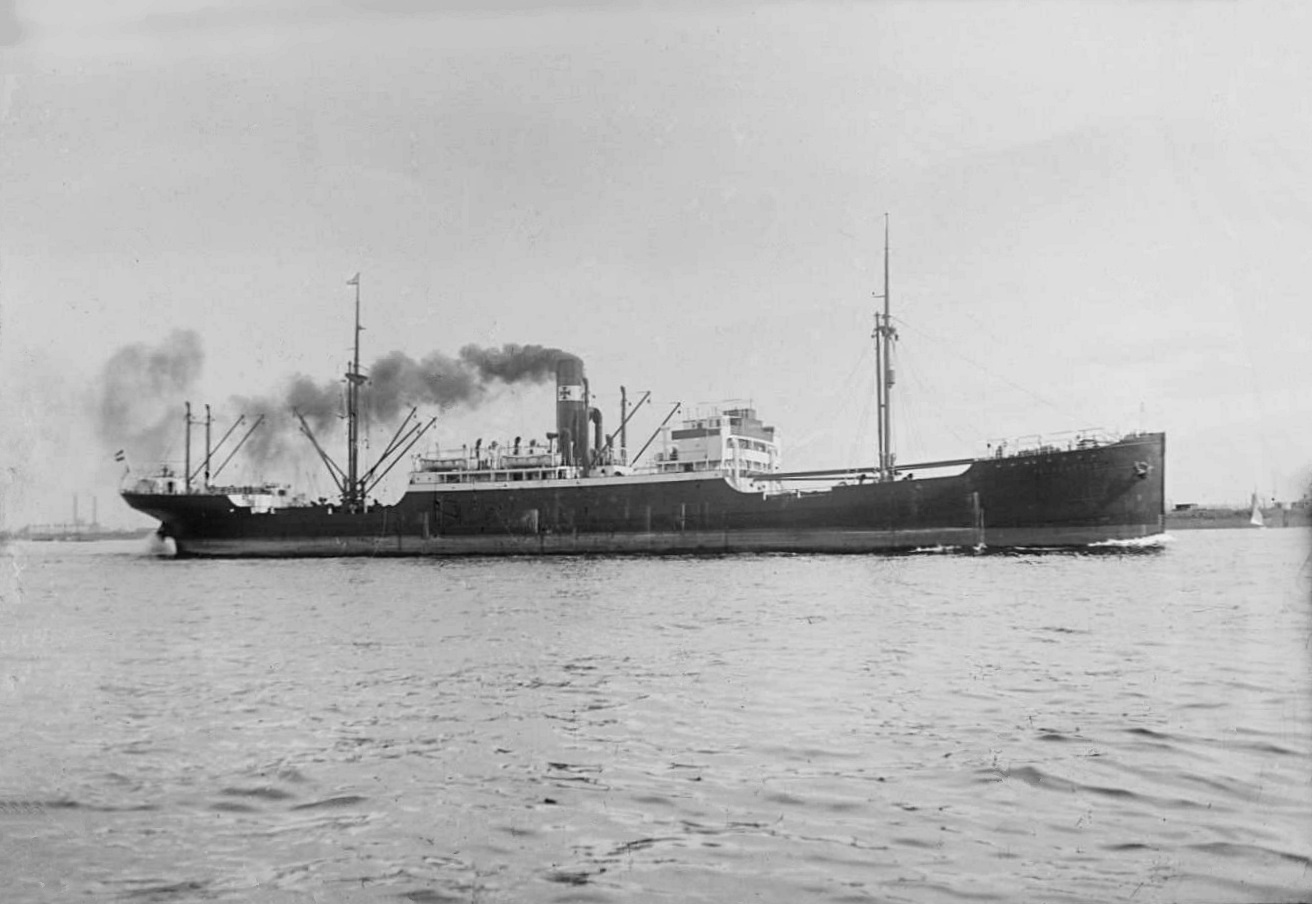
Pequot, another of the ships that Atlantic-Adriatic tried to buy from the USSB

After the First World War the USSB tried to sell its surplus ships. A freight company called the Atlantic-Adriatic Steamship Corporation bought Ascutney and six other USSB ships on what was called the "charter purchase plan". The others were Andalusia, Arcadia, Englewood, Galesburg, Pawnee, and Pequot. Each ship was owned by a different one-ship company, and Atlantic-Adriatic managed them. Atlantic-Adriatic was to pay the USSB for the ships in instalments of ten percent. On 7 August 1920 Ascutney left New York for Copenhagen, Denmark; on 27 August she was at the mouth of the River Tyne in England; and on 11 September she reached Copenhagen. She returned via the Azores and Bermuda, where she left on 26 October for New Orleans.

However, there was too little demand for transatlantic freight, and this caused rates to fall from $19 per ton to $16 per ton. Marsh & McLennan sued Atlantic-Adriatic for $27,325 owed on shipping insurance, and on 17 November 1920 Atlantic-Adriatic went into receivership with debts estimated at $1.5 million. Atlantic-Adriatic's president was Benjamin W Morse, one of the sons of fraudster Charles W. Morse. However, the USSB stated that "there is no criticism of B.W. Morse's administration of this company, so far as the facts are now developed".

Ascutney continued trading. On 2 December she left Baltimore. She sailed through the Panama Canal; on 12 December left Balboa on the Pacific coast of Panama; and she sailed to either Mejillones or Antofagasta in Chile. On 29 January 1921 got back to Balboa; and on 5 February she reached Pensacola, Florida. By 2 March the Pensacola Maritime Corporation had issued a legal notice:

"NOTICE—American steamer "Ascutney." All persons are hereby cautioned against harboring or trusting any of the personnel or crew, as no debts of their contracting will be paid unless they have our written approval, and no action can be started against the steamer for non-payment of bills in reference to work or supplies ordered by anyone other than Svend E. Faber, Master or ourselves.

Ascutney reached Port Eads, Louisiana on 14 April 1921, and left on 17 April. She reached Norfolk, Virginia on 11 May, and left on 18 May for Genoa, where she arrived on 5 June. On 6 September she left Algiers in French Algeria. On 26 September she called at Halifax, Nova Scotia for bunkers, and the next day she sailed for New York.

After September 1921 Ascutney no longer appears in US newspaper records of shipping movements. The USSB may have laid her up for lack of work. She was scrapped in Baltimore in February 1924.

== Bibliography ==
- Fiftieth Annual List of Merchant Vessels of the United States, for the Year ended June 30, 1918 (PDF). Washington, D.C.: Department of Commerce, Bureau of Navigation. 1919. p. 61 – via HyperWar.
- Haws, Duncan (1980). The Ships of the Hamburg America, Adler and Carr Lines. Merchant Fleets in Profile. Vol. 4. Cambridge: Patrick Stephens Ltd. ISBN 0-85059-397-2.
- Lloyd's Register of British and Foreign Shipping. Vol. I.–Steamers. London: Lloyd's Register of Shipping. 1897 – via Internet Archive.
- Lloyd's Register of British and Foreign Shipping. Vol. I.–Steamers. London: Lloyd's Register of Shipping. 1903 – via Internet Archive.
- Lloyd's Register of British and Foreign Shipping. Vol. I.–Steamers. London: Lloyd's Register of Shipping. 1906 – via Internet Archive.
- Lloyd's Register of British and Foreign Shipping. Vol. I.–Steamers. London: Lloyd's Register of Shipping. 1910 – via Internet Archive.
- Lloyd's Register of Shipping. Vol. II.–Steamers. London: Lloyd's Register of Shipping. 1919 – via Internet Archive.
- The Marconi Press Agency Ltd (1913). The Year Book of Wireless Telegraphy and Telephony. London: The St Katherine Press.
