= USCGC Winnisimmet =

Ship of the U.S. Coast Guard

History

United States
- Builder: Spedden Company, Baltimore, Maryland
- Cost: $50,000
- Launched: 11 October 1902
- Commissioned: 30 July 1903
- Decommissioned: October 1945
- Fate: Sold 22 July 1946
- Notes: Known as USRC Winnisimmet before 1915

General characteristics
- Class & type: Winnisimmet-class
- Type: harbor tug
- Displacement: 182 tons
- Length: 96 ft 6 in (29.41 m)
- Beam: 20 ft 6 in (6.25 m)
- Draft: 9 ft (2.7 m)
- Installed power: Babcock & Wilcox water boiler, triple-expansion steam engine, 500 SHP
- Propulsion: 1 screw
- Speed: 12 knots
- Range: 680 mi (1,090 km)
- Complement: 11
- Armament: none

USCGC Winnisimmet was one of two Winnisimmet-class harbor tugs constructed for the Revenue Cutter Service in 1903 and stationed at Boston, Massachusetts. The Navy assumed control of her from 6 April 1917 to 22 September 1919 during World War I. In September 1919 she was transferred from Boston to Baltimore, Maryland, where she remained until 1932. She was then assigned to Norfolk, Virginia where she remained in service until being decommissioned in October 1945. Before the U.S. Coast Guard was formed in 1915, she was known as the USRC Winnisimmet. The other cutter in the Winnisimmet-class was the USRC Wissahickon.
