= USS Amphion (ID-1888) =

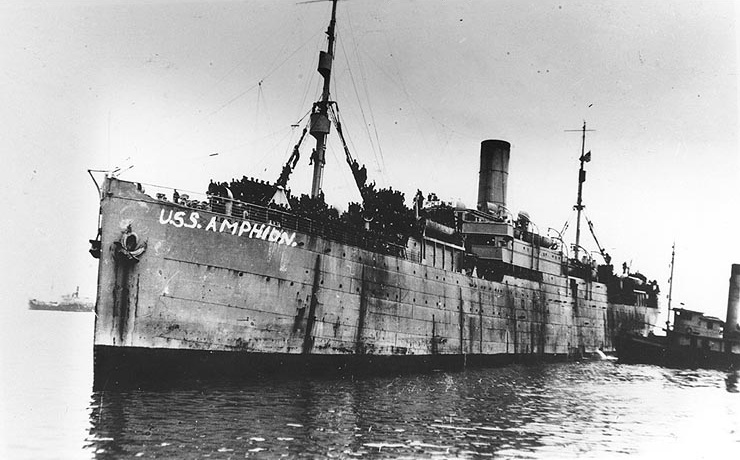
- USS Amphion

History

United States
- Name: Köln (1899–1917); Amphion (1917–1924)
- Namesake: City of Köln; Greek mythology, Amphion
- Builder: J. C. Teckenborg A. G., Geestemünde, Germany
- Launched: 24 July 1899
- Commissioned: 12 April 1919 (as USS Amphion)
- Decommissioned: 27 September 1919
- Maiden voyage: 20 October 1899 (Bremen—Galveston)
- Renamed: 1917
- Identification: Signal: QGTJ (Köln)
- Fate: Sold for scrap, 1924

General characteristics
- Tonnage: 7,410 GRT; 4,666 NRT; 8,970 DWT (summer)
- Displacement: 18,000 tons
- Length: 447 ft (136 m) LOA; 428 ft 9 in (130.7 m) Registry
- Beam: 54 ft 3 in (16.54 m)
- Draft: 38 ft 3 in (11.7 m) loaded; 30 ft (9.1 m) aft
- Depth: 39 ft 4 in (12.0 m)
- Decks: 2 full & awning deck
- Installed power: 6 X Scotch boilers
- Propulsion: 2 X triple expansion engines
- Speed: 12 kts.
- Capacity: 120 2nd, 1,850 3d class passengers
- Complement: 85 (Navy)

The first USS Amphion was a former German passenger liner SS Köln for Norddeutscher Lloyd from 1899–1917. Köln had been interned in Boston on the outbreak of war in Europe and confiscated in April 1917 when the United States entered the war. The ship was under the control of the United States Shipping Board (USSB) that allocated commercial type ships to military or civilian use during the war. Köln was renamed Amphion and operated by USSB for the Army as United States Army Chartered Transport (U.S.A.C.T.) Amphion as an animal transport taking mules, horses and general cargo to forces in Europe. At the end of the war the USSB allocated the ship to the Navy, which used the ship from April to September 1919 as a troop transport for returning the United States Expeditionary Force from Europe.

The USSB contracted for the refurbishment of the ship after return by the Navy but the glut of war built ships, many new, resulted in Amphion lying idle from 1920 until sold for scrap in January 1924.

== Norddeutscher Lloyd Köln ==
Köln was built in 1899 by J. C. Teckenborg A. G., Geestemünde, Germany, for Norddeutscher Lloyd. The ship, signal letters QGTJ, was a 7,410 GRT, twin screw, awning deck type vessel of lighter construction in which the upper deck was not a full deck but a light covering deck above the main deck. There were two full decks. The ship was intended for the line's Baltimore and Galveston trade with limited cabin class accommodation and concentration on steerage passenger and cargo space. The ship was launched 24 July 1899 and placed in service 20 October 1899 on a voyage from Bremen to Galveston and on 21 December on initial service to Baltimore.

Registry information shows 4,666 Net tonnage, registry length of 428 ft 9 in (130.7 m), breadth 54 ft 3 in (16.5 m) and depth of 39 ft 4 in (12.0 m). USSB data after the war shows loaded draft as 38 ft 3 in (11.7 m) with 7,409 GRT and summer 8,970 DWT. Navy shows draft aft as 30 ft (9.1 m) with a 447 ft (136.2 m) overall length. There were six holds with six hatches, the largest 26 ft (7.9 m) by 16 ft (4.9 m), served by seventeen booms, and ten winches of five ton capacity each. Two double ended and two single ended, a total of six, Scotch boilers provided steam to two triple expansion engines. (Note: The USSB data indicates quadruple expansion, while Lloyd's triple expansion. The USSB then gives dimensions for only three cylinders while in the ship above, America/Amerika, the "4-expansion" is clearly followed by dimensions of four cylinders.)

The ship was configured to carry 120 second class and 1,850 third class passengers and in addition to Baltimore and Galveston made voyages to Boston, Montreal, New Orleans, New York, Philadelphia, and Quebec. Köln made her last voyage to Boston on 29 July 1914 before war and internment.

== World War I ==
When World War I broke out in August 1914, Köln was interned by the United States Government. When the United States entered the war in April 1917, Köln was seized,

=== U.S.A.C.T. Amphion (April 1917 – April 1919 ===
The USSB was operating the ship, with a Naval gun crew for protection, for United States Army requirements as the United States Army Chartered Transport (U.S.A.C.T.) Amphion to be used as an animal transport to move mules and horses for American Expeditionary Force (A.E.F.) in France.

Amphion was the first animal transport to sail from the Chesapeake on 14 October 1917, with forage, 881 mules, 169 horses and general cargo. The transport, loaded with animals for the A.E.F., was approaching Brest alone on 30 October 1917 separated from a convoy in fog when a surfaced submarine was spotted close on the port bow. The bridge officer turned sharply toward the submarine, attempting to ram, and the forward gun got off three shots followed by the gun on the stern. Some shots seemed to be hits, and the gun crews were officially commended.

Amphion was returning to the United States on 12 October 1918 when the German submarine SM U-155 attacked with gunfire in the Atlantic Ocean at 36°06′N 62°59′W. The first shot disabled Amphion's wireless, and the submarine fired about two hundred more rounds as Amphion fled, firing about seventy-two rounds in return, with one believed aboard to be a hit. The German fire riddled the upper works and destroyed five lifeboats before Amphion outran the submarine. Two of the ship's crew were killed, one lasting until landed at Bermuda, with the more seriously of the six surviving wounded, including two of the gunners, were landed for treatment.

=== U.S.S. Amphion (April—September 1919) ===
World War I ended on 11 November 1918. With the war over, Amphion was transferred to and commissioned by the United States Navy as USS Amphion (ID Number 1888) in April 1919. Between 21 May and 3 September 1919, USS Amphion journeyed thrice to France – twice to St. Nazaire and once to Brest – bringing home 6,410 American troops.

Amphion was decommissioned at Brooklyn, New York, on 27 September 1919 and turned over to the United States Shipping Board (USSB) for disposition. Her name was simultaneously stricken from the Naval list. The USSB solicited bids for the extensive reconditioning work that would be required to make the vessel fit for civilian work as exclusively a cargo ship and let the contract to the lowest bidder in Providence, Rhode Island. Unforeseen work was found to be necessary, delaying the ship's return to fitness until 14 March 1920, when the ship left Providence and was returned to New York awaiting allocation. In January 1924, the USSB sold her to Boston Iron and Metal Company for $175,000 for scrapping.
