= SS Devonian (1900) =

British cargo steamship sunk in 1917

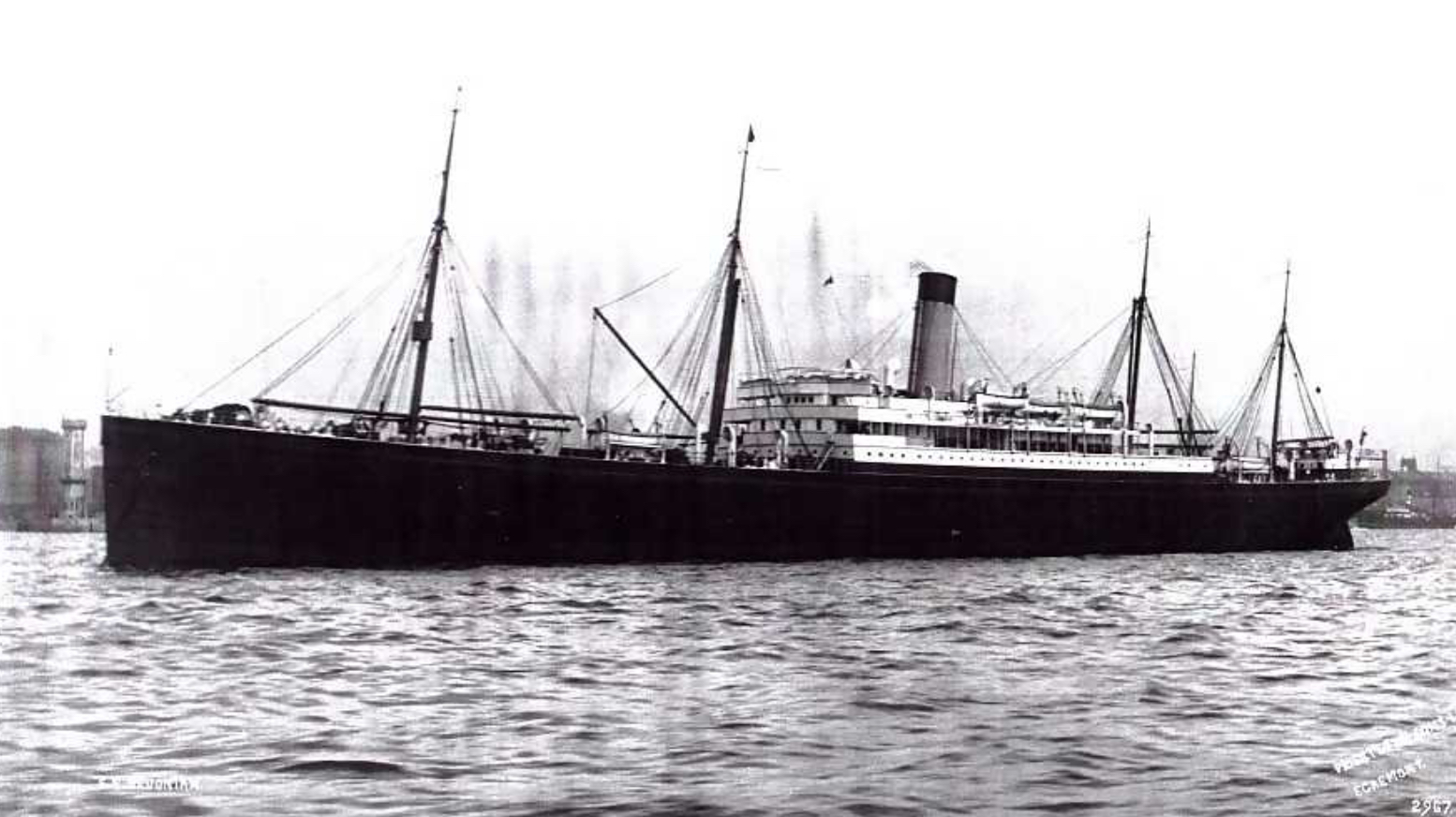
- Devonian in the Mersey Estuary

History

United Kingdom
- Name: Devonian
- Owner: F Leyland & Co
- Port of registry: Liverpool
- Route: Liverpool – Boston
- Builder: Harland & Wolff, Belfast
- Laid down: 331
- Launched: 28 April 1900
- Completed: 6 September 1900
- Maiden voyage: 15 September 1900
- Identification: UK official number 113399; code letters RTVD; call sign MDL
- Fate: Sunk by torpedo, 1917

General characteristics
- Type: cargo liner
- Tonnage: 10,418 GRT, 6,823 NRT
- Length: 552.5 ft (168.4 m)
- Beam: 59.3 ft (18.1 m)
- Depth: 36.8 ft (11.2 m)
- Decks: 3
- Installed power: 847 NHP or 5,500 ihp
- Propulsion: 1 × triple-expansion engine; 1 × screw
- Sail plan: four-masted schooner
- Speed: 14 knots (26 km/h)
- Capacity: as built: 125 passengers; 900 head of cattle; refrigerated cargo: 1901: 8,640 cubic feet (245 m^{3}); 1903: 34,400 cubic feet (974 m^{3}); 1914: 53,330 cubic feet (1,510 m^{3})
- Crew: 1906: 82; 1917: 60
- Armament: 1916: 1 × 4-inch (100 mm) gun
- Notes: sister ship: Winifredian

SS Devonian was a British cargo liner that was launched in Ireland in 1900. She was designed to carry a large number of cattle or other livestock, and a smaller number of passengers. When she was built, she had a small amount of refrigerated space in her holds. This was increased twice in her career. She spent her whole career with Frederick Leyland & Co, mostly on a scheduled route between Liverpool and Boston.

Devonian survived two fires in Boston. In 1907, her cattle feed caught fire, some of her cargo was destroyed, but she avoided serious damage. In 1908, part of East Boston caught fire, including warehouses where she was docked, but she avoided damage by being warped away from the quayside.

Devonian took part in three North Atlantic rescues. In 1910, she rescued 16 survivors from the British cargo ship West Point, which had burned and sunk. In 1913, she rescued 59 survivors from the emigrant ship Volturno, which caught fire in a storm. Also in 1913, she towed to safety the French cargo ship Mexico, which had lost its propeller.

In the First World War, Devonian brought thousands of horses from Boston to Liverpool for the British Army. A U-boat sank her in 1917 off the north coast of Ireland.

== Building ==
In 1899 and 1900, Harland & Wolff (H&W) in Belfast launched a pair of cargo liners for Frederick Leyland & Co. Yard number 324 was launched on 11 March 1899 as Winifredian, and completed on 8 July. Yard number 331 was launched on 28 April 1900 as Devonian, and completed on 6 September. They were similar to Armenian, Victorian and Cestrian, which H&W had launched for Leyland in 1895, but 40 ft (12 m) longer, and with a more powerful engine.

Devonian's registered length was 552.5 ft (168.4 m), her beam was 59.3 ft (18.1 m), and her depth was 35.0 ft (10.7 m). She had eight cargo hatches, and could carry 900 head of cattle and 125 passengers. She was a one-class ship, offering second-class accommodation only. As built, 8,640 cubic feet (245 m^{3}) of her cargo space was refrigerated. Her tonnages were 10,405 GRT and 6,816 NRT.

She had a single screw, driven by a three-cylinder triple-expansion engine that was rated at 847 NHP or 5,500 ihp, and gave her a speed of 14 knots (26 km/h). She had two double-ended and two single-ended boilers, with a total of 18 corrugated furnaces. The furnaces' total grate area was 329 square feet (31 m^{2}) and her boilers' total heating surface area was 13,368 square feet (1,242 m^{2}). Her boilers' working pressure was 200 psi. She also had four masts, and could be rigged as a schooner.

Leyland registered Devonian at Liverpool. Her United Kingdom official number was 113399 and her code letters were RTVD. On 15 September 1900, Devonian left Liverpool on her maiden voyage, which was to Boston.

== More refrigerated capacity ==
By July 1903, her refrigerated cargo capacity had been increased to 34,400 cubic feet (974 m^{3}). By that November, the cargo holds of Devonian and several other Leyland ships had been fitted with an electric fan ventilation system to keep them cool enough to carry cargoes such as apples. As well as serving Boston, in 1903 Devonian made two calls at Portland, Maine. On the first, she left Portland for Liverpool on 26 September. On the second, she was due to reach Portland on 25 October and leave for Liverpool on 31 October. Leyland's main aim was to attract seasonal freight, but the company also advertised passenger fares at $65 for the September sailing, and $50 for the October sailing.

== Aground at Scitaute ==
On 5 February 1906, Devonian left Liverpool with a cargo of about 2,000 tons of machinery and Egyptian cotton. She carried crew of 82, and four passengers. In a heavy snowstorm on the night of 14–15 February, her crew were unable to see Minot's Ledge Light. She overshot the mouth of Boston Harbor by about 4 or 5 nautical miles (7 or 9 km), ran into a bank of fog, and at 01:00 or 01:30 hrs grounded on a rock ledge about 500 feet (150 m) from the shore between Second and Third Cliff at Scituate, Massachusetts. Her Master, Captain Ridley, had the watertight doors closed in her bulkheads; her lifeboats swung out on their davits ready for launching; and a Coston flare fired.

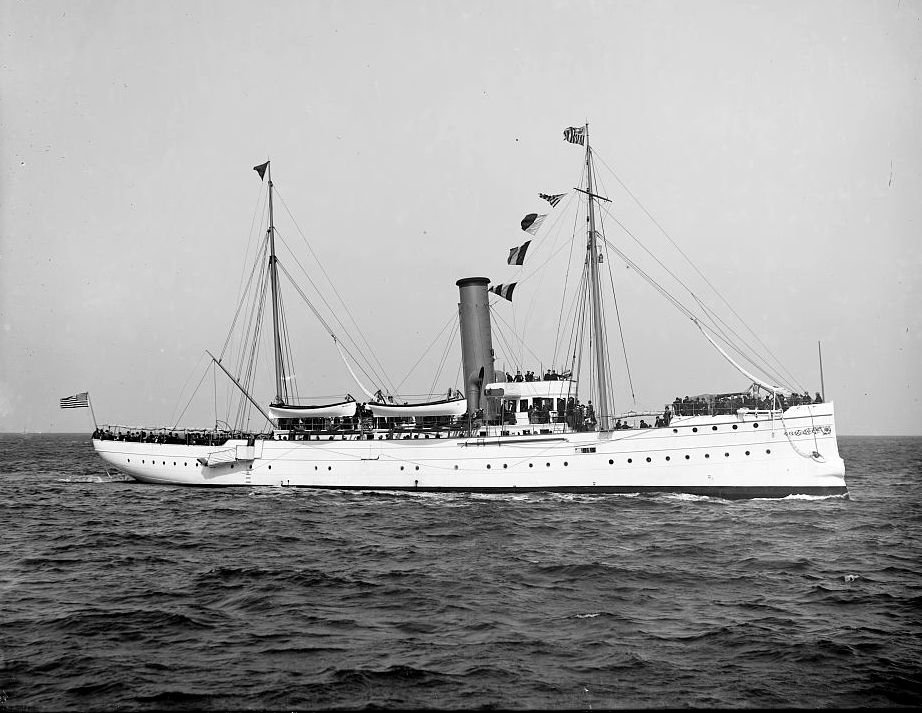
USRC Gresham

The Massachusetts Humane Society life-saving station on Third Cliff acknowledged her flare and sent its lifeboat out to the ship. But Devonian showed no sign of breaking up, and the passengers and crew chose to remain aboard. Devonian had grounded at almost high tide, so no attempt to refloat her could be made for several hours. The tugs Confidence, Juno, and Pallas were sent from Boston, but were unable to get close enough to assist. The cutter USRC Gresham arrived shortly after 12:00 hrs, but was not able to get close enough either.

The tug Patience, registered in Philadelphia, and owned by the Tice Towing Co of New York, succeeded in getting a line aboard Devonian. At 15:32 hrs, the ship, aided by Patience, refloated herself, and at about 18:00 hrs reached Boston's quarantine station under her own power. She was expected to dock in Boston at 08:00 hrs the next morning. On 17 February, Patience's owner, Walter J Tice of Hackensack, New Jersey, filed a libel at the United States District Court for the District of Massachusetts in Boston against Devonian for her salvage. Tice did not mention a sum, but Patience's Captain suggested it should be about $20,000.

== Two fires in Boston ==
On 11 March 1907, Devonian was at the White Star Line docks in Charlestown, Boston, when fire broke out on the steerage deck in her number 4 hold. It started in six car-loads of baled hay that she had loaded to use as cattle fodder for her voyage to Liverpool. The fire destroyed the hay, and ruined 20,000 bushels of corn. A fire hose burst on deck, and the water damaged machinery and Egyptian cotton from Liverpool that Devonian was unloading. One firefighter was injured when the hose burst, and a Fire Department lieutenant was overcome by smoke. The total damage to cargo was estimated at $50,000. However, the ship was expected to leave Boston on schedule in 14 March.

On 8 July 1908, Devonian was in port in East Boston, and part-way through loading her cargo at the Leyland Line pier, when fire broke out on one of the Boston and Albany Railroad's piers nearby. It started in a warehouse whose contents included wool, Egyptian cotton, grease, and oil. Fanned by a northerly wind, within half an hour it destroyed four 800-foot (240 m) piers, three warehouses, a grain elevator, and many loaded railroad freight cars. The damage was estimated at $1.5 million. The elevator and two of the piers belonged to the B&A Railroad. The Leyland Line pier was also destroyed. The fire came close to the slipways of the Boston, Revere Beach and Lynn Railroad, which suspended its ferry services for two and a half hours.

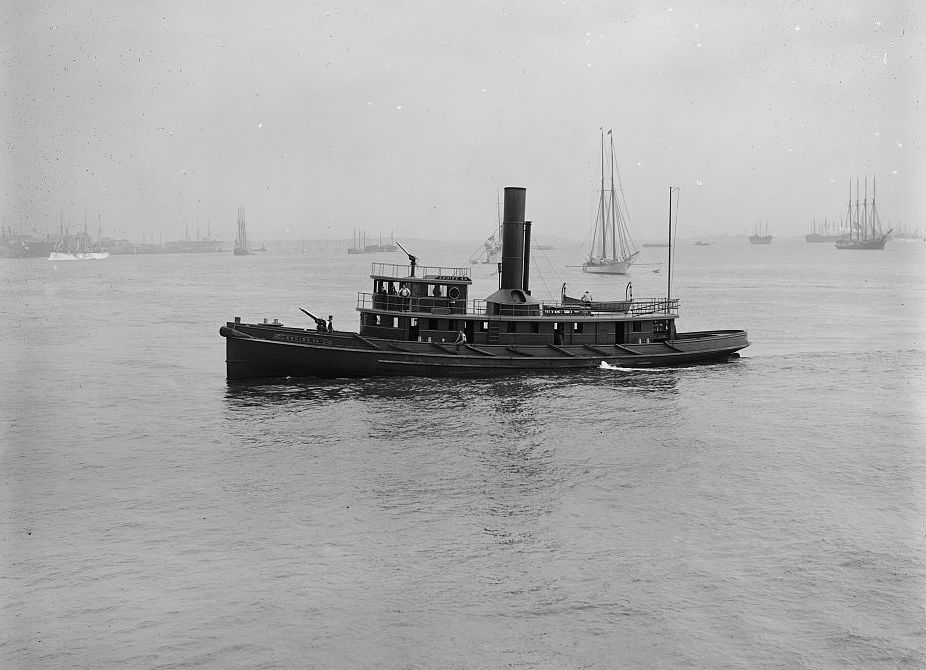
Fireboat 44, a Boston fireboat like those that fought the 1908 fire

A 70-year-old watchman at the Cunard Line pier was killed, and at least one firefighter was hospitalised with serious burns. The Boston and Chelsea Fire Departments fought the fire, as did fireboats, tugs, and the cutter USRC Gresham. The fire badly damaged the Canadian steel-hulled barque Belmont and two US wooden-hulled schooners: the five-master Paul Palmer, and four-master O. H. Brown. Not all of Devonian's crew were present, but Leyland's Boston superintendent rushed aboard her, a fire drill was called, and a number of longshoremen helped to warp her away from the wharf in time to prevent her being damaged.

Insurers paid to replace the destroyed piers, warehouses, and grain elevator, and repair the damaged ships. The B&A Railroad replaced the grain elevator with a new one that was twice the size of the one that was destroyed. It was completed in October 1910, cost $1 million, and its capacity was one million bushels. When new, it was the largest in New England. It could unload 300,000 bushels from one ship in 20 hours, and load 20,000 bushels an hour into a ship. Devonian was the first ship to be loaded from the new elevator. In the second week of October 1910, she loaded 110,000 bushels of grain to take to Liverpool.

== West Point rescue ==
By 1910, Devonian was equipped with wireless telegraphy, supplied and operated by the Marconi Company. On 18 August 1910, the British cargo steamship West Point left Glasgow for Charleston, South Carolina. On 27 August, fire broke out in her engine room. The fire soon disabled the donkey engine that powered her pumps, which impeded her crew from fighting the fire. On 28 August, they abandoned ship in two lifeboats: her Master and half of the crew in one, and her Chief Officer and the other half of the crew in the other. They stood by the burning ship, but on 29 August, she sank, 600 nautical miles (1,100 km) off Cape Race, at position 42°20′N 44°10′W or 45°43′N 40°41′W (accounts differ). The two boats managed to keep together until the night of 31 August, but then lost each other. The two boats last saw each other at position 47°08′N 42°24′W.

On the morning of 1 or 2 September (accounts differ), Devonian sighted the Chief Officer's lifeboat, rescued its occupants, and brought the lifeboat aboard by Devonian's davits. Devonian searched for the Master's lifeboat, but visibility was poor, there was intermittent mist, and she failed to find it. She broadcast wireless messages asking other ships to look for the missing boat. Devonian's wireless had a transmitting range of only about 250 nautical miles (460 km), but the ocean liners RMS Mauretania and Rotterdam received her signal, and relayed it to the Marconi station ashore at Cape Race.

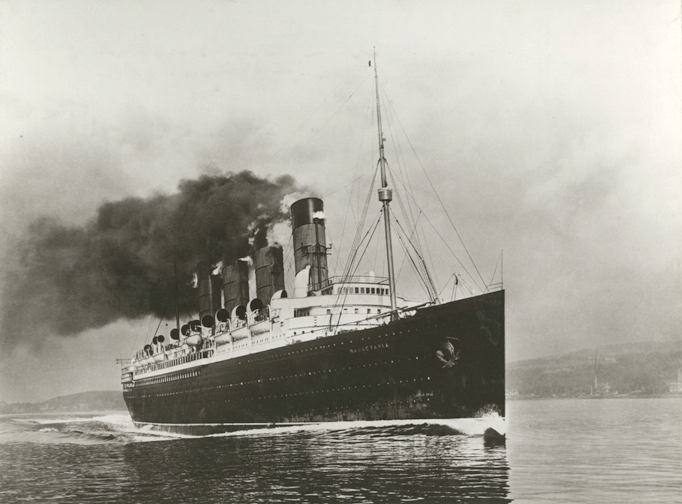
RMS Mauretania

At midnight on the night of 2–3 September, Mauretania found the Master's lifeboat and rescued its occupants. Devonian was westbound, and landed her survivors at Boston. Mauretania was eastbound, and landed her survivors in Britain. The news that Mauretania had found the Master's lifeboat was relayed via Cape Race and the liner Deutschland to Devonian. On 7 September, Devonian reached Boston, having delayed herself by two days for the rescue and search, and landed 145 passengers as well as the 16 survivors from West Point. The British Consul in Boston was to arrange their repatriation to Britain.

== Cabin class ==
On 14 September 1910, Devonian made one sailing from New York instead of Boston. Leyland advertised her passenger accommodation as "first class" and offered berths at $67.50 each. However, in December 1912, Leyland Line advertised Devonian's passenger accommodation as "one class cabin service", and the fare from Boston to Liverpool was $50. "Cabin class" was a concept of good-quality one-class accommodation that Canadian Pacific pioneered in the years just before the First World War, and whose popularity led other companies to copy it.

== Mexico rescue ==
On 28 January 1913, Devonian left Boston for Liverpool with a cargo of grain and 14 passengers. Early on 30 January, the Compagnie Générale Transatlantique cargo liner Mexico, in passage from New York to Dunkirk, lost her propeller. She broadcast a wireless distress signal, and Devonian was the first ship to reach her. In darkness and a heavy sea, Devonian's crew succeeded in passing two steel hawsers to Mexico, and took her in tow. They set course for the nearest port, Halifax, Nova Scotia, which was 400 nautical miles (740 km) away. At first they had good weather, but from 2 February, the two ships faced a high sea. The hawsers held, and on 4 February, the pair reached Halifax. The combined value of Mexico and her cargo was more than $1 million, making her one of the most valuable rescues to a North American port for many years. Devonian's crew was expected to be due at least $50,000 salvage money to share between them.

== Volturno rescue ==
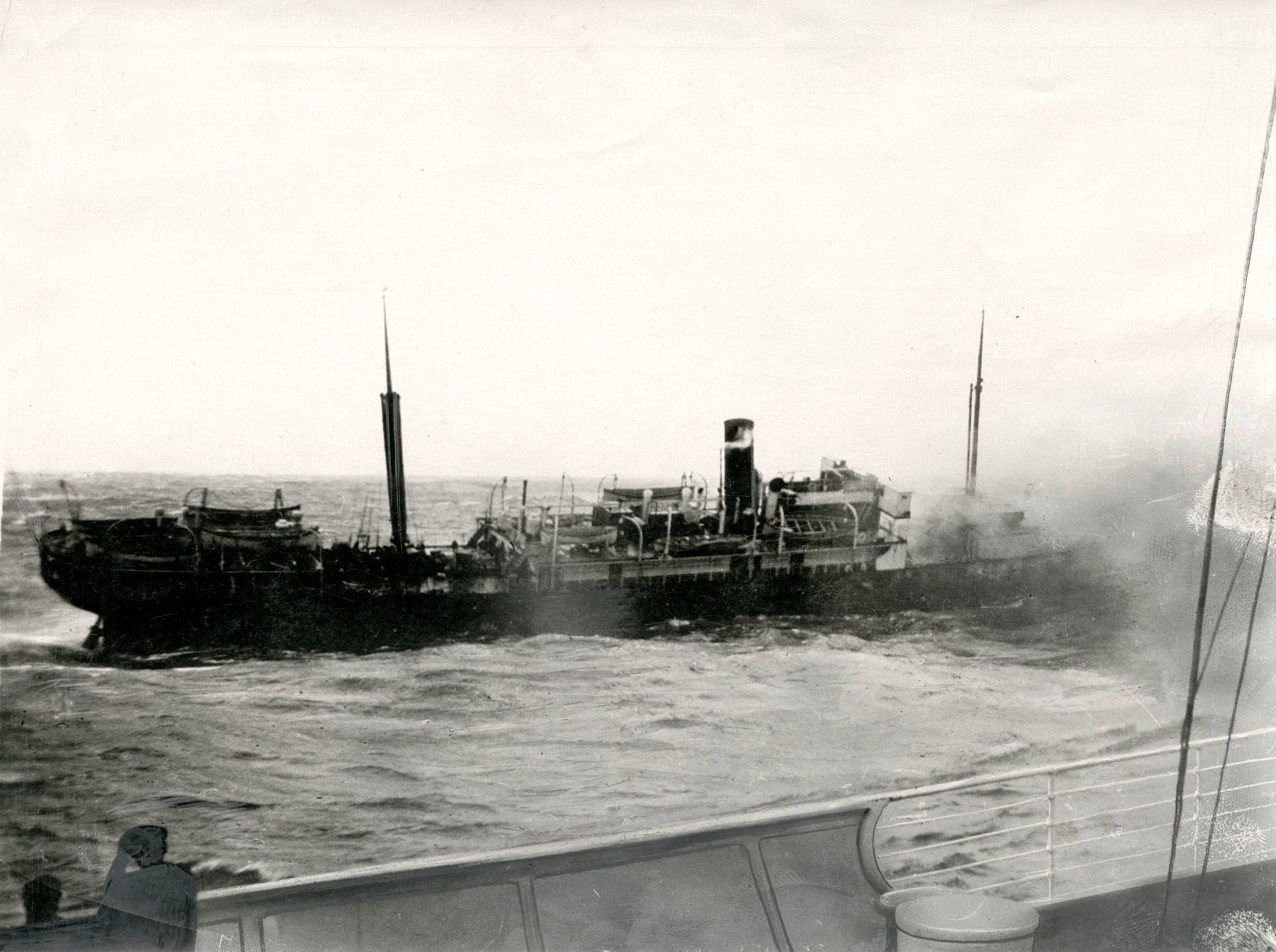
Volturno on fire, seen from RMS Carmania

On the morning of 9 October 1913, the emigrant ship Volturno caught fire en route from Rotterdam to New York via Halifax. The fire spread rapidly in the forward part of the ship, and she broadcast a wireless distress signal from position 48°25′N 34°23′W. Volturno launched six of her lifeboats, but four of them were smashed against her side, and the other two were missing, believed sunk. Devonian was one of ten or more ships, led by the Cunard Liner RMS Carmania, that came to her aid. Carmania was larger and less manoeuvreable than the other rescue ships, so she stood off and directed rescue operations.

The next morning, the sea subsided somewhat, and the oil tanker Narragansett arrived and poured oil on the sea surface, which further moderated the waves. The rescue ships then sent lifeboats to Volturno, whose crew lowered women and children to them in coal baskets. Devonian's lifeboats rescued 59 of the survivors: 21 children, 20 women, and 18 men. She landed them at Liverpool on 14 October, whence they were to resume their voyage to New York on Carmania's next westbound crossing.

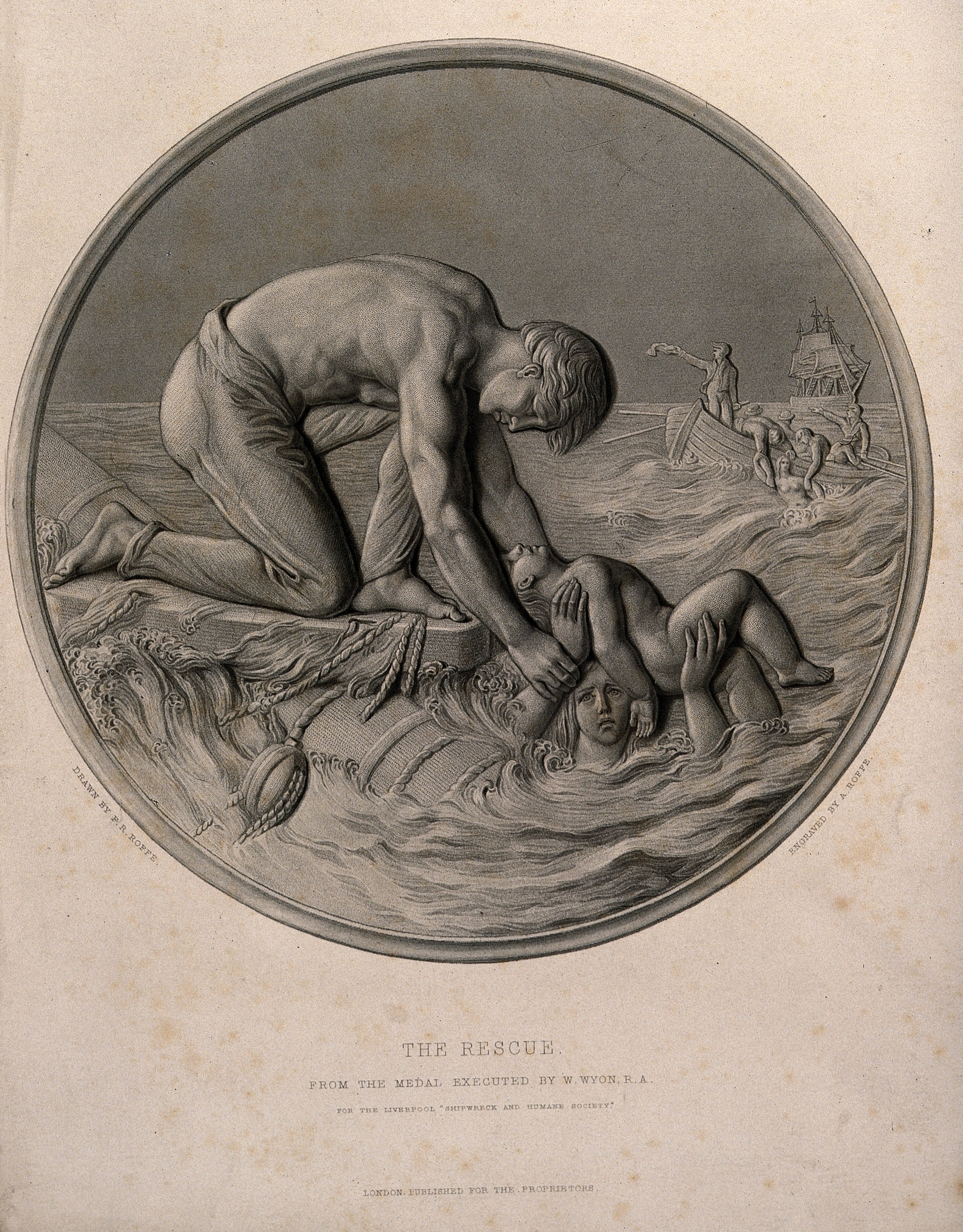
"The Rescue": the design for the obverse of the Liverpool Shipwreck and Humane Society's marine medals

A few weeks later, the Liverpool Shipwreck and Humane Society made awards to the officers and boat crews of Carmania and Devonian. To Carmania's Captain James Clayton Barr and Devonian's Captain Trant, it awarded its Gold Marine Medal. To their officers, the Society awarded its Silver Marine Medal. To the crews of their lifeboats, it awarded its Bronze Marine Medal and a sum of money.

== Mutiny ==
On 22 January 1914, Devonian left Liverpool for Boston with a mixed crew: some were union members, and others were non-unionised. Soon after she left port, unionised stokers refused to obey officers' orders until the non-union men were put ashore. Devonian put into Holyhead, where police arrested 19 union members.

By 1914, Devonian's wireless call sign was MDL. By that June, her refrigerated cargo capacity had been increased to 60,790 cubic feet (1,721 m^{3}).

== First World War ==
After the First World War began in August 1914, Devonian remained on her regular route. On 21 August 1914, she left Liverpool carrying 150 passengers, most of them US citizens fleeing the war in Europe. She reached Boston on 1 September. On a westbound crossing on 9 October 1914, a passenger, Annie Robinson, jumped overboard and was drowned. She had been a stewardess on RMS Titanic, and became distressed as Devonian navigated through thick fog, sounding her foghorn.

On 9 February 1915, Devonian left Boston carrying cargo including 1,100 horses for the Entente armies. She reached Liverpool on 21 February. On 20 March, she left Boston carrying 1,000 horses for the British Army, plus food, cotton, and chilled meat in her refrigerated holds. In April, she left Boston with another 1,017 horses for British cavalry regiments. In August 1915, Devonian loaded another 1,100 horses in Boston, but then unloaded them, and left for Liverpool on 13 August with a cargo of 40,000 bushels of barley, 32,000 bushels of wheat, and 17,000 bushels of corn. Another British steamship, Cambrian, which had loaded 900 horses in Boston, also unloaded them and sailed without them. On 24 February 1916, Devonian left Boston for Liverpool. In mid-April, she left Boston carrying 1,150 horses for the British Army. That was Leyland's last shipment of horses for the time being.

In Boston on 28 September 1916, a 4-inch (100 mm) gun was mounted on Devonian's poop as defensive armament. Two Royal Navy gunners were transferred from the dreadnought HMS Queen Elizabeth to Devonian to form the nucleus of her gun crew.

In Boston on 1 November, Devonian's holds were fumigated to prepare them for a cargo of grain. Her hatch covers were removed to let the fumes disperse, and the port health authorities then told the local manager of the International Mercantile Marine Company, Leyland's parent company, that it was safe for longshoremen to start unloading the ship. The longshoremen worked overnight, and then in the morning a gang of carpenters entered Number 2 hold. Fumes quickly overcame two of the carpenters. The foreman of the gang, who was also the father of one of the two men, and Devonian's Chief Officer, John Selby, entered the hold and started to drag the two men to safety, but both Selby and the foreman were overcome. Captain Trant organised a rescue using improvised gas masks.

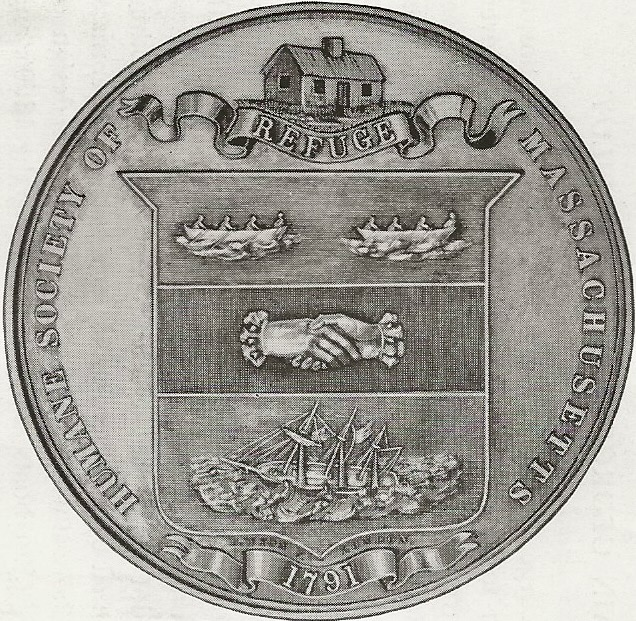
Silver life-saving medal of the Massachusetts Humane Society

Three of the carpenters died, including the foreman and his son. Three other men were hospitalised, and their condition was described as serious. Chief Officer Selby survived, and in March 1917, the Massachusetts Humane Society awarded him its silver medal for life-saving.

On 29 January 1917, Devonian left Boston carrying munitions and 1,000 horses. She reached Liverpool on 10 February. On Saturday 10 March, she reached Boston carrying a $2 million cargo of cotton for New England mills, and 207 US passengers who in January had sailed as hostlers tending horses aboard the Leyland ship Parisian from Newport News, Virginia to Liverpool.

== Loss ==
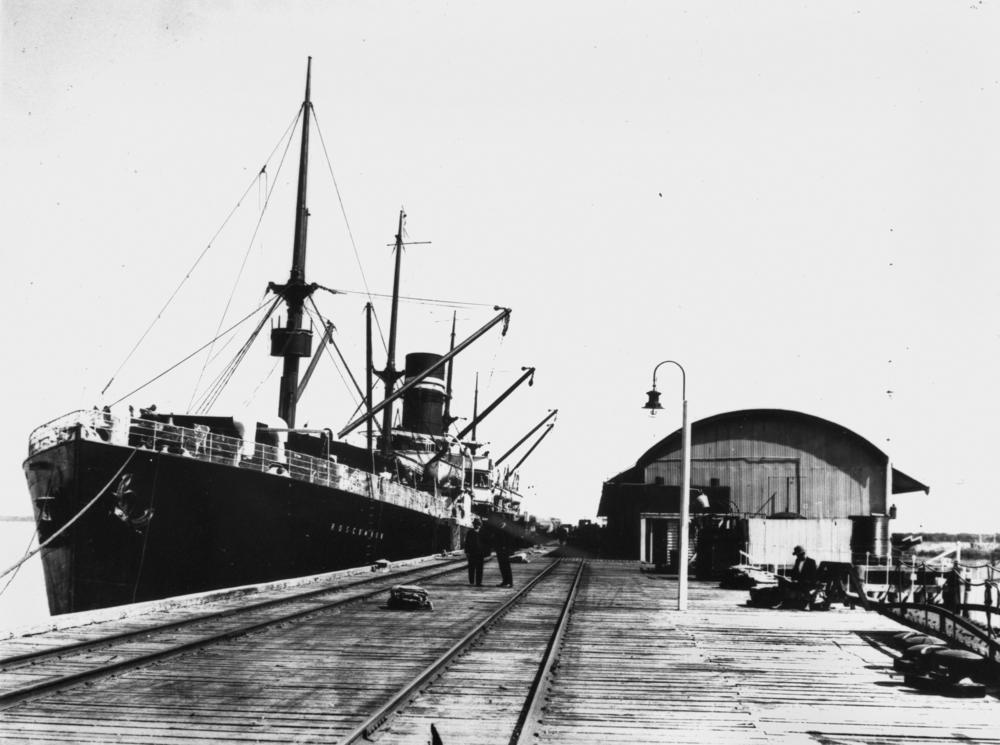
Roscommon

On 28 July, Devonian, commanded by Captain Trant, left Boston for Liverpool carrying munitions, plus 65 US citizens as hostlers. Early on 21 August, she left Liverpool for Boston. She sailed in a convoy of 15 merchant ships, escorted by 11 Royal Navy submarines. Four U-boats approached the convoy on the surface about 38 nautical miles (70 km) off the north coast of Ireland. Six of the British submarines used their deck guns to engage the U-boats, while the remainder tried to screen the convoy. U-53 torpedoed the British refrigerated cargo ship Roscommon amidships, sinking her in a matter of minutes at position 55°29′24″N 8°01′02″W.

At 11:55 hrs, a torpedo from U-53 hit Devonian's port quarter in her number 6 and 7 holds. The explosion killed the ship's carpenter and his assistant, and destroyed one of Devonian's lifeboats. Her crew successfully launched her remaining eight boats, but some people jumped overboard and floated clinging to floating wreckage. British aircraft arrived and bombed the U-boats. Then Royal Navy submarine chasers arrived and joined the battle. A tug and a trawler arrived, rescued those survivors who were in the water, and then rescued Captain Trant and a dozen men who were still aboard the ship. Devonian sank at 12:45 hrs. Survivors were landed at Buncrana, Ireland. Devonian was estimated to be worth more than $1 million when she was lost.

Devonian's wreck is at position 55°30′10″N 8°01′52″W, north of Horn Head, County Donegal, at a depth of more than 230 feet (70 m).

== Bibliography ==
- Haws, Duncan (1979). The Ships of the Cunard, American, Red Star, Inman, Leyland, Dominion, Atlantic Transport and White Star lines. Merchant Fleets in Profile. Vol. 2. Cambridge: Patrick Stephens Ltd. ISBN 0-85059-324-7.
- Lloyd's Register of British and Foreign Shipping. Vol. I.–Steamers. London: Lloyd's Register of Shipping. 1901 – via Internet Archive.
- Lloyd's Register of British and Foreign Shipping. Vol. I.–Steamers. London: Lloyd's Register of Shipping. 1903 – via Internet Archive.
- Lloyd's Register of British and Foreign Shipping. Vol. I.–Steamers. London: Lloyd's Register of Shipping. 1910 – via Internet Archive.
- Lloyd's Register of Shipping. Vol. I.–Steamers. London: Lloyd's Register of Shipping. 1914.
- The Marconi Press Agency Ltd (1914). The Year Book of Wireless Telegraphy and Telephony. London: The Marconi Press Agency Ltd.
- Mercantile Navy List. London. 1900 – via Crew List Index Project.
- Wilson, RM (1956). The Big Ships. London: Cassell & Co.
