= SS Winifredian =

British cargo steamship

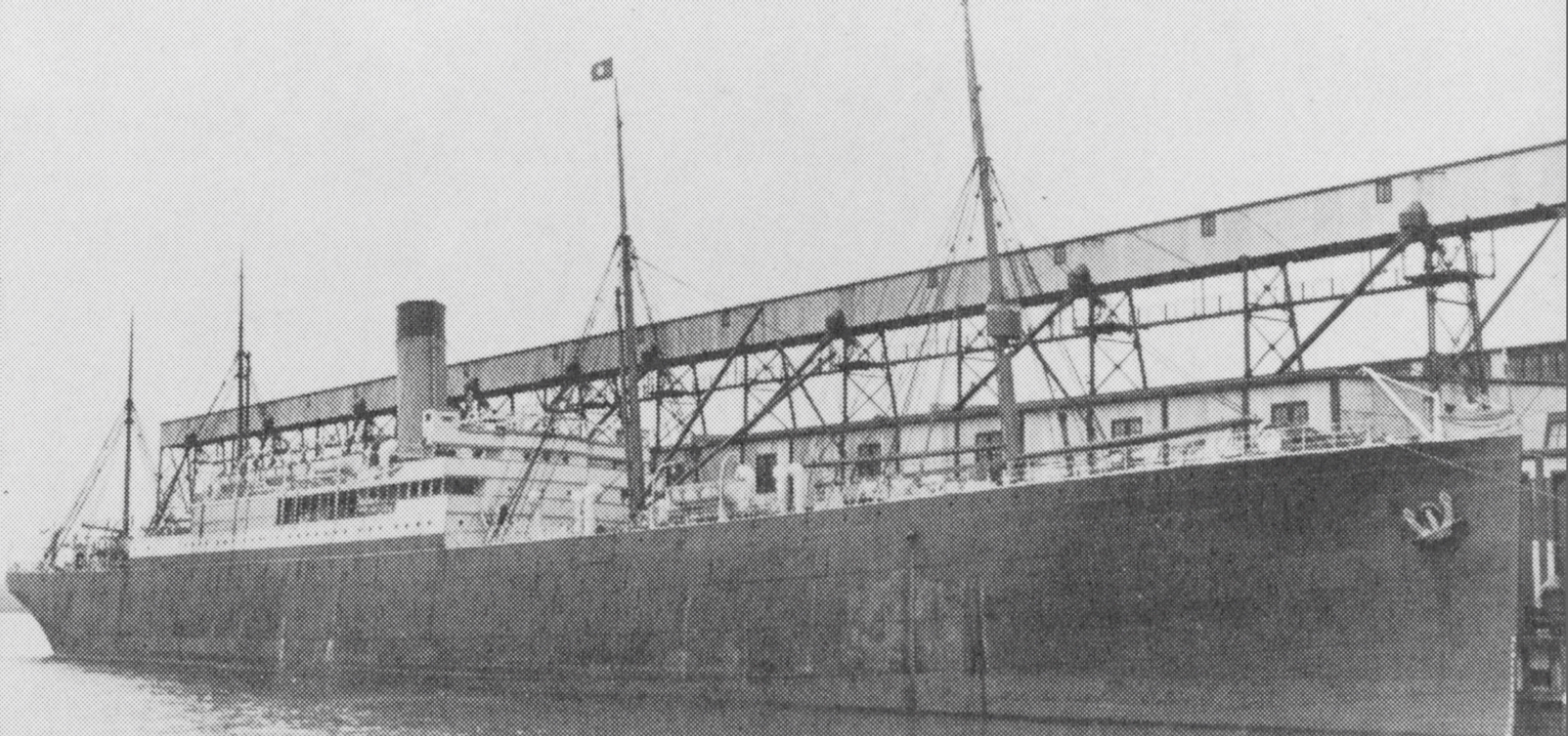
- Winifredian in Boston

History

United Kingdom
- Name: Winifredian
- Owner: F Leyland & Co
- Operator: 1927: Red Star Line
- Port of registry: Liverpool
- Route: 1899: Liverpool – Boston; 1927: Antwerp – New York
- Builder: Harland & Wolff, Belfast
- Yard number: 324
- Launched: 11 March 1899
- Completed: 8 July 1899
- Maiden voyage: 22 July 1899
- Identification: UK official number 110584; code letters RFTW; by 1914: call sign MFL
- Fate: Scrapped 1929

General characteristics
- Type: cargo liner
- Tonnage: 10,405 GRT, 6,816 NRT
- Length: 552.5 ft (168.4 m)
- Beam: 59.3 ft (18.1 m)
- Depth: 28.9 ft (8.8 m)
- Decks: 3
- Installed power: 847 NHP or 5,500 ihp
- Propulsion: 1 × triple-expansion engine; 1 × screw
- Sail plan: four-masted schooner
- Speed: 14 knots (26 km/h)
- Capacity: as built: 140 passengers; 820 head of cattle; refrigerated cargo: 1901: 8,640 cubic feet (245 m^{3}); 1903: 43,400 cubic feet (1,229 m^{3}); 1914: 60,790 cubic feet (1,721 m^{3})
- Troops: Boer War: at least 68 officers + 1,832 other ranks; First World War: at least 83 officers + 2,344 other ranks
- Notes: sister ship: Devonian

SS Winifredian was a British cargo liner that was launched in Ireland in 1899. She was designed to carry a large number of cattle or other livestock, and a smaller number of passengers. When she was built she had a small amount of refrigerated space in her holds. This was increased twice in the first 15 years of her career. In the Second Boer War and the First World War she carried troops and horses. She survived striking a mine in 1917. She spent her whole career with Frederick Leyland & Co, mostly on a scheduled route between Liverpool and Boston. She was scrapped in Italy in 1929.

== Building ==
In 1899 and 1900 Harland & Wolff (H&W) in Belfast launched a pair of cargo liners for Frederick Leyland & Co. Yard number 324 was launched on 11 March 1899 as Winifredian, and completed on 8 July. Yard number 331 was launched on 2 April 1900 as Devonian, and completed on 6 September. They were similar to Armenian, Victorian and Cestrian, which H&W had launched for Leyland in 1895, but 40 ft (12 m) longer, and with a more powerful engine.

Winifredian's registered length was 552.5 ft (168.4 m), her beam was 59.3 ft (18.1 m), and her depth was 35.0 ft (10.7 m). She had eight cargo hatches, and was designed to carry 820 head of cattle and 140 passengers. She was a one-class ship, offering second-class accommodation only. She could also carry 600 head of cattle and 900 head of sheep. As built, 8,640 cubic feet (245 m^{3}) of her cargo space was refrigerated. Her tonnages were 10,405 GRT and 6,816 NRT.

She had a single screw, driven by a three-cylinder triple-expansion engine that was rated at 847 NHP or 5,500 ihp, and gave her a speed of 14 knots (26 km/h). She had two double-ended and two single-ended boilers, with a total of 18 corrugated furnaces. The furnaces' total grate area was 329 square feet (31 m^{2}) and her boilers' total heating surface area was 13,368 square feet (1,242 m^{2}). Her boilers' working pressure was 200 psi. She also had four masts, and could be rigged as a schooner.

Leyland registered Winifredian at Liverpool. Her United Kingdom official number was 110584 and her code letters were RFTW. On 22 July 1899 she left Liverpool on her maiden voyage, which was to Boston.

== Second Boer War ==
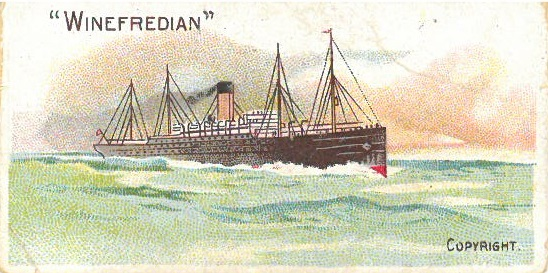
Singleton & Cole cigarette card of Winifredian

On 21 December 1899 the Admiralty chartered Winifredian as Transport number 78 for the Second Boer War. She carried cavalry. Between 19 January and 8 June 1900 she took 65 officers, two warrant officers, 1,492 other ranks, and 911 horses to South Africa. She also brought nine officers and 661 other ranks back from South Africa. The Admiralty paid £102,267 for the charter, fittings, bunkering, and port dues.

On 28 January 1900 at Langton Dock, Liverpool, Winifredian embarked Imperial Yeomanry companies 9, 10, 11, and 12, a total of 578 men and 457 horses. 9 Company were Yorkshire Hussars; 10 Company were Sherwood Rangers; 11 Company were Yorkshire Dragoons; and 12 Company were South Nottinghamshire Hussars. Winifredian bunkered at São Vicente, Cape Verde, whence she left on 7 February. She reached Cape Town in Cape Colony on 20 February, and were the first Imperial Yeomanry battalion to reach South Africa.

On the evening of 1 April 1900 Winifredian left Southampton carrying 30 officers, 704 men, and 167 horses. On 3 April she called Queenstown (now Cobh) in Ireland, where she embarked 38 officers, 1,005 other ranks, and 497 horses. On 17 May she left Natal carrying five officers; 398 men listed as "convalescent"; and a number of prisoners, including one man who had deserted to the Boers. The convalescents were listed as 328 sick, and 70 wounded. She reached Southampton on 7 June.

In 1901 and 1902 Winifredian was a "Freight Ship (Men)". On 17 May 1901 in Halifax, Nova Scotia she embarked 41 officers and warrant officers, 778 other ranks, and 923 horses, whom she took to Durban in the Colony of Natal. On 27 June 1902 in Durban she embarked 45 officers and 704 other ranks of the 2nd Battalion, Canadian Mounted Rifles. She reached Halifax on 22 July.

On 13 September 1902 in Cape Town she embarked 60 officers and 1,832 men, including the 1st Battalion, the Coldstream Guards; 1st Battalion, the Scots Guards; and 1st Battalion, the Oxfordshire and Buckinghamshire Light Infantry. She was due to reach Southampton on 4 October.

== 1902 to 1914 ==
By July 1903 Winifredian's refrigerated cargo capacity had been increased to 43,400 cubic feet (1,229 m^{3}). By that November the cargo holds of Winifredian and several other Leyland ships had been fitted with an electric fan ventilation system to keep them cool enough to carry cargoes such as apples. Winifredian was the first of the fleet to be so equipped. That November she was due to leave Boston carrying 20,000 barrels of apples to Liverpool.

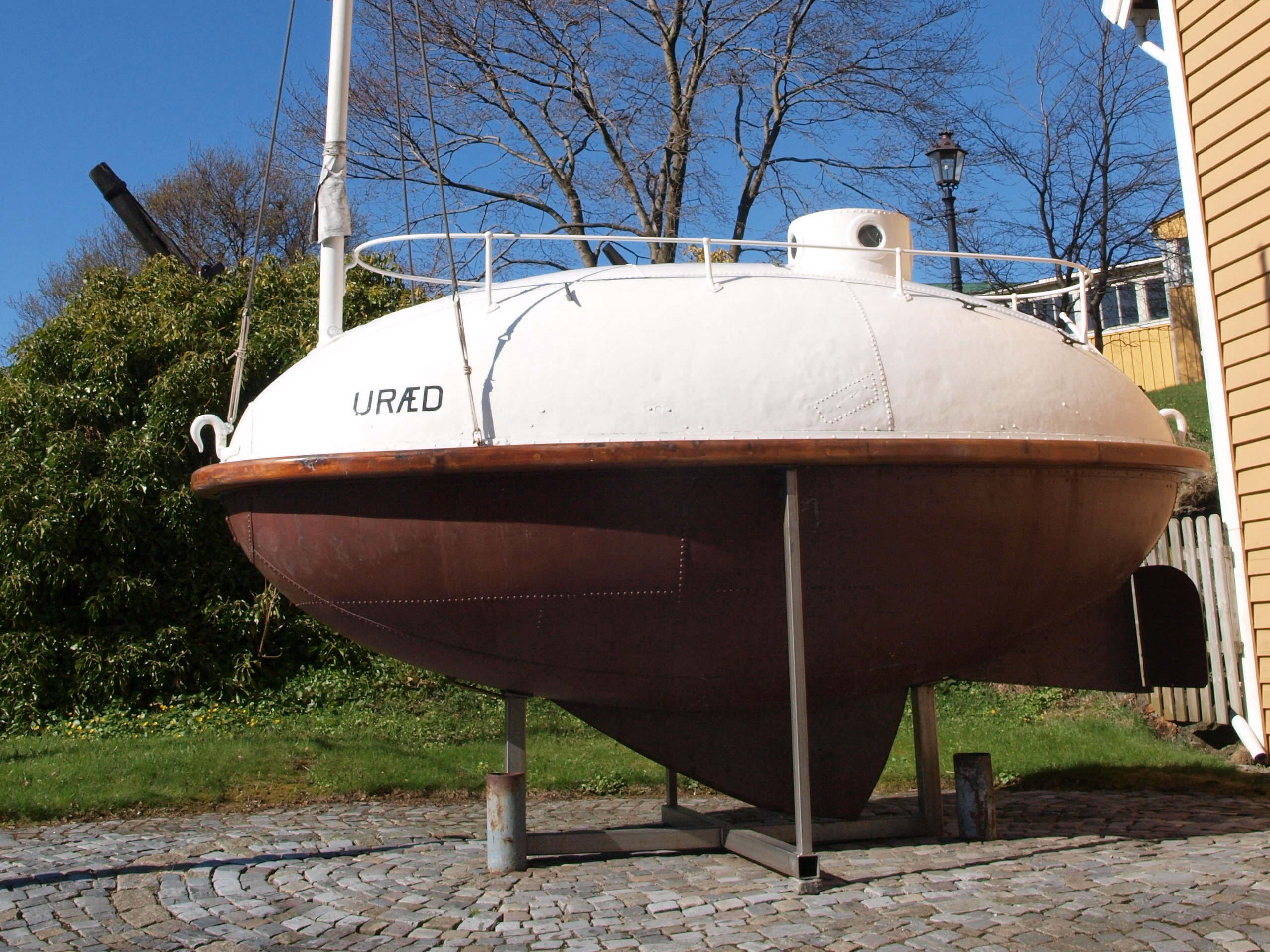
Ole Brude's Uræd

On 27 December 1904 Winifredian reported meeting "a small turret boat under sail on which were two men" 200 nautical miles (370 km) east of Boston Light. It was Uræd, an 18-foot (5 m) prototype enclosed lifeboat that Norwegian Captain Ole Brude had designed and built. Brude and three crewmen had left Ålesund in Uræd on 7 August, sailed her across the North Atlantic, and reached St. John's, Newfoundland on 10 November. A few days later they left St. John's to try to reach New York. The two men asked Winifredian to report that all was well with them. However, after meeting Winifredian, Uræd encountered a number of gales, in one of which she lost her rudder off Cape Cod. On 8 January she reached Gloucester, Massachusetts, where her crew misread navigation lights and she ran aground. Uræd survived the grounding, and was towed into Gloucester for repairs.

In a snowstorm on 5 February 1907 the fishing schooner Ellen F. Gleason from Gloucester, Massachusetts collided with Winifredian 300 nautical miles (560 km) east of Boston. The schooner stayed afloat, but her bow was stove in. The sea was too rough for Winifredian to lower any of her boats, so the steamship positioned herself to windward of the schooner, providing some shelter in which to link the two ships with a rescue line. All 15 of the schooner's crew were hauled to safety aboard Winifredian, and landed at Boston the next day. Ellen F. Gleason remained adrift and a hazard to navigation.

On a westbound voyage in June 1910 Winifredian's crew found two stowaways two days after the ship left Liverpool. They were a Latvian sailor and a German. The two men were told they would not be allowed to land in Boston, and Winifredian would take them back to Liverpool. When Winifredian got about 10 nautical miles (19 km) from the US coast they used a rope to let themselves overboard, and tried to swim ashore, each wearing a life preserver. The water was far colder than they expected, and within minutes the German suffered cramp. Both men lost consciousness. The United Fruit Company Greenbrier rescued both men, but the German died of hypothermia. On 10 June the Latvian was landed at Boston, where the Bureau of Immigration put him back aboard Winifredian to be returned to Liverpool.

By 1910 Winifredian was equipped with wireless telegraphy, supplied and operated by the Marconi Company. By 1914 her wireless call sign was MFL. On 4 January 1913 Winifredian's Master, Captain Frederick Shepherd, was arrested in Boston for allegedly failing to arrange "efficient communication between the bridge of the steamer and the operator". He was held in $500 bonds for trial on 12 January.

By 1914 Winifredian's refrigrated cargo capacity had been increased to 60,790 cubic feet (1,721 m^{3}). On 26 January in mid-Atlantic a lightning strike damaged Winifredian's foremast.

== First World War ==
Winifredian was a troop ship again in the First World War. In February 1915 she left Liverpool for Newport News, Virginia, but was damaged by heavy weather on 5 February, and put into Queenstown in Ireland for repairs. While entering the harbour she grounded on Camden bank, and was towed off by a tug.

On 17 April 1917 Winifredian was in the North Sea en route from Hull to Boston when she struck a mine that UC-76 had laid at position 58°22′N 3°04′W, 7 nautical miles (13 km) north by east of Noss Head in Scotland. The ship remained afloat, reached port, and was repaired.

On 6 April 1919 Winifredian left Brest, France carrying 2,327 officers and men of the American Expeditionary Forces' 26th Infantry Division, including units from Vermont, Massachusetts, and Rhode Island. On 18 April she reached Commonwealth Pier in Boston.

On the night of 8–9 June 1919 she reached Boston carrying 83 officers and 2,344 men, including three battalions of the 23rd Engineers and a company of the 520th Engineers. The troops went to Fort Devens. On 10 June she was due to leave Boston on her scheduled route to Liverpool.

== 1919 to 1929 ==
The social reformer and suffragist Elizabeth Glendower Evans booked to sail on Winifredian from Boston to Liverpool. However, when she went arrived to board the ship on 2 October 1919 a deputy tax commissioner stopped her. An income tax receipt was a new requirement for foreign travel. Mrs Evans was unable to provide either a receipt or evidence that she was exempt. Her baggage was put ashore, and Winifredian sailed without her.

On 18 October 1919 Winifredian sighted the German barque Paul in distress in a heavy sea 350 nautical miles (650 km) southeast of Halifax. The barque's foremast was badly damaged, and she was in imminent danger of sinking. Winifredian stood by, but the German crew twice declined an offer to be rescued. As Winifredian steamed away, a large wave engulfed the barque, sweeping several men overboard.

In December 1920 the Lloyd Royal Belge steamship Menapier, in passage from Antwerp to New Orleans, was caught in a hurricane. Several of her crew were washed overboard, and several others suffered broken legs, broken arms, or internal injuries. She had no ship's doctor, so she broadcast a wireless distress signal. Winifredian had a doctor, a Patrick Burns from Rhode Island. She received Menapier's signal, and steamed 100 nautical miles (190 km) at full speed to meet Menapier, but the sea was too rough to lower a boat to transfer Winifredian's doctor to Menapier. Instead, Menapier's wireless operator transmitted details of each patient's injuries to Winifredian, whose wireless operator replied with Dr Burns' instructions to treat him. The two ships kept close to each other for three days, until Menapier signalled to Winifredian: "All your instructions safely carried out. The men are resting comfortably and are out of danger."

On a westbound crossing in January and February 1921 Winifredian weathered a series of storms that damaged lifeboats and broke deck fittings. On 6 February her Chief Officer was directing the salvage of her lifeboats when he was thrown to the deck and broke his right arm. Dr Burns set his broken bone. The ship reached Boston on 11 February, three days late.

On 20 April 1922 the Leyland steamship Oxonian, in passage from Portland, Maine to Liverpool, broke her rudder stock 800 nautical miles (1,500 km) southeast of Halifax at position 40°42′N 48°33′W. Winifredian answered her wireless distress signal and went to her aid. The International Ice Patrol cutter USCGC Seneca relayed the news by wireless to Halifax.

The 1921 Emergency Quota Act restricted immigration into the US. On 24 July 1923 the International Mercantile Marine Company, Leyland's US parent company, instructed Winifredian to make an unscheduled call at Halifax to disembark 16 British migrants, because the UK's immigration quota to the US for that year had been filled. Winifredian was due in Boston on 28 July, but the diversion delayed her by two days.

From 1927 Red Star Line chartered Winifredian for its route between Antwerp and New York. However, she returned to her route between Liverpool and Boston. On 6 October 1928 she left Boston for her final crossing to Liverpool, ending 29 years of service. She carried cargo and 50 passengers. On 6 May 1929 she arrived in Genoa to be broken up.

== Bibliography ==
- Haws, Duncan (1979). The Ships of the Cunard, American, Red Star, Inman, Leyland, Dominion, Atlantic Transport and White Star lines. Merchant Fleets in Profile. Vol. 2. Cambridge: Patrick Stephens Ltd. ISBN 0-85059-324-7.
- Lloyd's Register of British and Foreign Shipping. Vol. I.–Steamers. London: Lloyd's Register of Shipping. 1901 – via Internet Archive.
- Lloyd's Register of British and Foreign Shipping. Vol. I.–Steamers. London: Lloyd's Register of Shipping. 1903 – via Internet Archive.
- Lloyd's Register of British and Foreign Shipping. Vol. I.–Steamers. London: Lloyd's Register of Shipping. 1910 – via Internet Archive.
- Lloyd's Register of Shipping. Vol. I.–Steamers. London: Lloyd's Register of Shipping. 1914.
- The Marconi Press Agency Ltd (1914). The Year Book of Wireless Telegraphy and Telephony. London: The Marconi Press Agency Ltd.
- Mercantile Navy List. London. 1900 – via Crew List Index Project.
