= SS Abessinia =

Two steamships have borne the name Abessinia, after the German name for the Ethiopian Empire:

- SS Abessinia (1900) was a 5,633-ton passenger/cargo ship launched on 16 June 1900, by Palmers', Jarrow, England. Lost on 3 September 1921 on her way to be delivered as war reparations.
- SS Abessinia (1920) was a 1,565-ton cargo ship completed in October 1920, by Bremer Vulkan in Vegesack, Germany. Renamed twice, torpedoed and sunk as the Italian Sebastiano Bianchi by a submarine off Cape Spartivento, Italy, on 13 December 1940.

== See also ==
- SS Abyssinia, a British mail steamer, built in 1870
