= SS Cestrian =

British steamship sunk in 1917

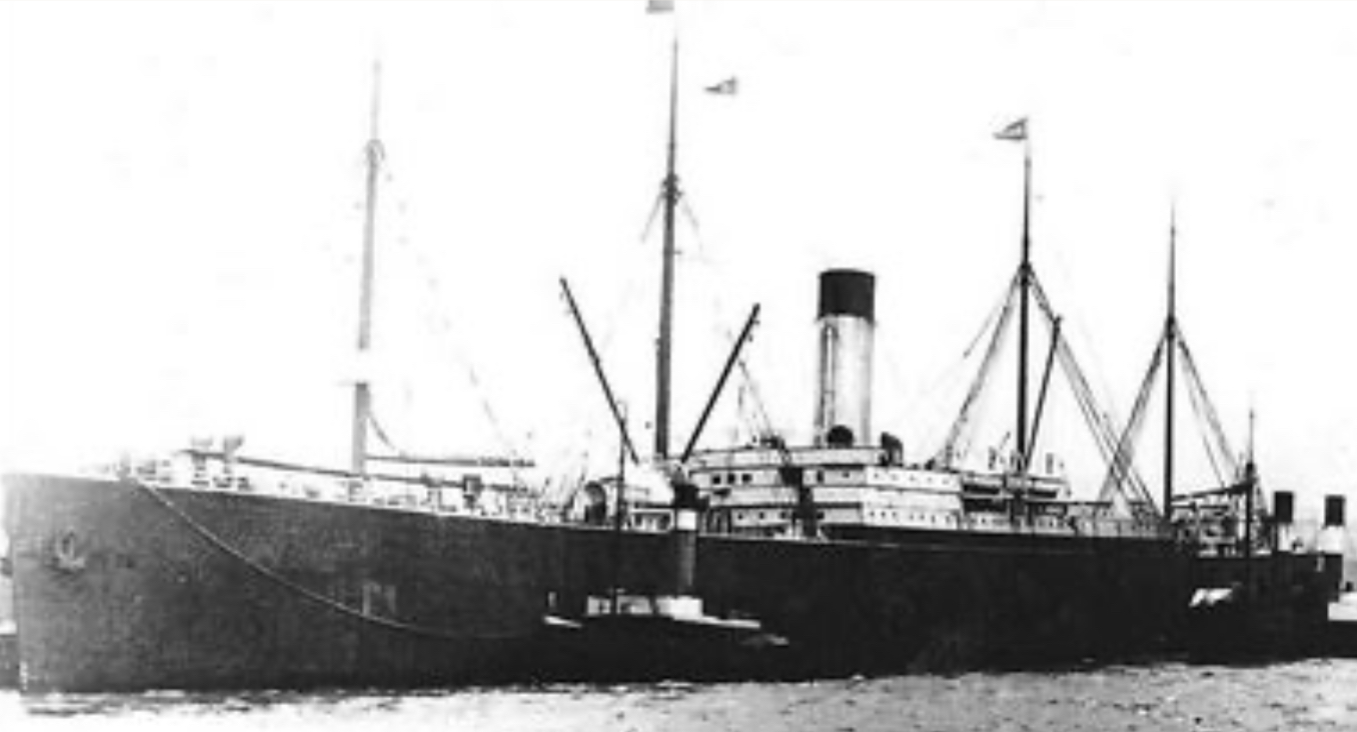

History

United Kingdom
- Name: Cestrian
- Namesake: demonym of Chester
- Owner: F Leyland & Co
- Port of registry: Liverpool
- Route: Liverpool – Boston
- Builder: Harland & Wolff, Belfast
- Yard number: 296
- Launched: 21 September 1895
- Completed: 5 March 1896
- Maiden voyage: 11 March 1896
- Identification: UK official number 105372; code letters PGDH; call sign MHL
- Fate: Sunk by torpedo, 24 June 1917

General characteristics
- Type: Cargo liner
- Tonnage: 8,761 GRT, 5,711 NRT
- Length: 512.5 ft (156.2 m)
- Beam: 59.2 ft (18.0 m)
- Depth: 35.0 ft (10.7 m)
- Decks: 3
- Installed power: 718 NHP
- Propulsion: 1 × triple-expansion engine; 1 × screw
- Sail plan: four-masted schooner
- Speed: 13 knots (24 km/h)
- Capacity: 50 passengers; 900 head of cattle
- Notes: sister ships: Victorian, Armenian

SS Cestrian was a British cargo liner that was launched in Ireland in 1895. Leyland Line owned and operated her throughout her career. For most of her career her regular route was across the North Atlantic between Liverpool and Boston, and she carried cattle from Boston to Liverpool. On a few occasions she served New York instead of Boston.

She carried troops and horses in the Second Boer War. In the 1910s she made a few voyages to the Gulf Coast of the United States. She carried donkeys, horses and troops in the First World War. A U-boat sank her in the Aegean in 1917.

== Building and registration ==
In 1895 Harland & Wolff in Belfast launched three cargo liners for Leyland Line. Yard number 291 was launched on 6 July as Victorian, and completed on 31 August. Yard number 292 was launched on 25 July as Armenian, and completed on 19 September. Yard number 296 was launched on 21 September as Cestrian, and completed on 5 March 1896.

Cestrian's registered length was 512.5 ft (156.2 m), her beam was 59.2 ft (18.0 m), and her depth was 35.0 ft (10.7 m). She had capacity for at least 900 head of cattle and 50 passengers. Her tonnages were 8,761 GRT and 5,711 NRT. When new, Victorian, Armenian, and Cestrian were noted for being of "exceptionally large tonnage" among newly built ships, second only to White Star Line's Georgic. Cestrian had a single screw, driven by a three-cylinder triple-expansion engine that was rated at 718 NHP and gave her a speed of about 13 knots (24 km/h). She also had four masts, and could be rigged as a schooner.

Leyland registered Cestrian at Liverpool. Her United Kingdom official number was 105372 and her code letters were PGDH.

== 1890s ==
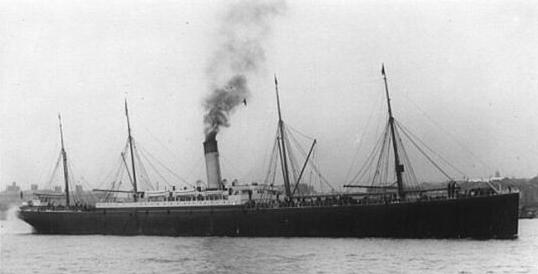
Sister ship Armenian

On 11 March 1896 Cestrian left Liverpool on her maiden voyage, which was to Boston. Her Master was Captain Trant, who was Commodore of the Leyland fleet. Liverpool – Boston was her regular scheduled route. Her cargoes to Boston included wool and Egyptian cotton.

On 22 May 1898 Cestrian left Liverpool for Boston with 28 passengers. On 27 May she was steaming at reduced speed through fog when she struck an iceberg at position 43°40′N 48°15′W. The collision crushed and twisted her bow on her port side for a distance of 20 feet (6 m). Captain Trant ordered her lifeboats swung out on their davits, but she remained afloat, and she reached Boston on 31 May.

== Second Boer War ==
On 23 November 1899 the Admiralty chartered Cestrian as Transport Number 71 for the Second Boer War. E Thmas had succeeded Captain Trant as her Master. She was engaged on 1 December, and on the afternoon of 21 December she left Southampton carrying 28 officers, two warrant officers, 764 men, and 479 horses. They included 165 men and 161 horses of the 14th King's Hussars; 179 men, 196 horses six field guns and an ammunition train of 11 vehicles of the Royal Horse Artillery; 210 men of the 2nd Battalion, the Royal Scots Fusiliers; 50 men of the Royal Welch Fusiliers; 25 men of the Post Office Corps; and a party of the Royal Army Medical Corps (RAMC). On 28 December she called at Las Palmas; on 6 January she called at Durban in Natal; and on 10 January she reached Cape Town in Cape Colony.

On 23 January the Admiralty returned Cestrian to her owners. She had been chartered for 53 days, of which 21 were at sea. Her charter was the shortest of all of the transport ships in that war. For this, the Admiralty paid Leyland £49,845 for the charter, fittings, bunkering, and port dues.

By May 1900 Cestrian was back on her merchant route between Liverpool and Boston. On 7 July she left New York on a new service, carrying passengers and 200 head of cattle. However, by 5 September she was back on her route between Liverpool and Boston.

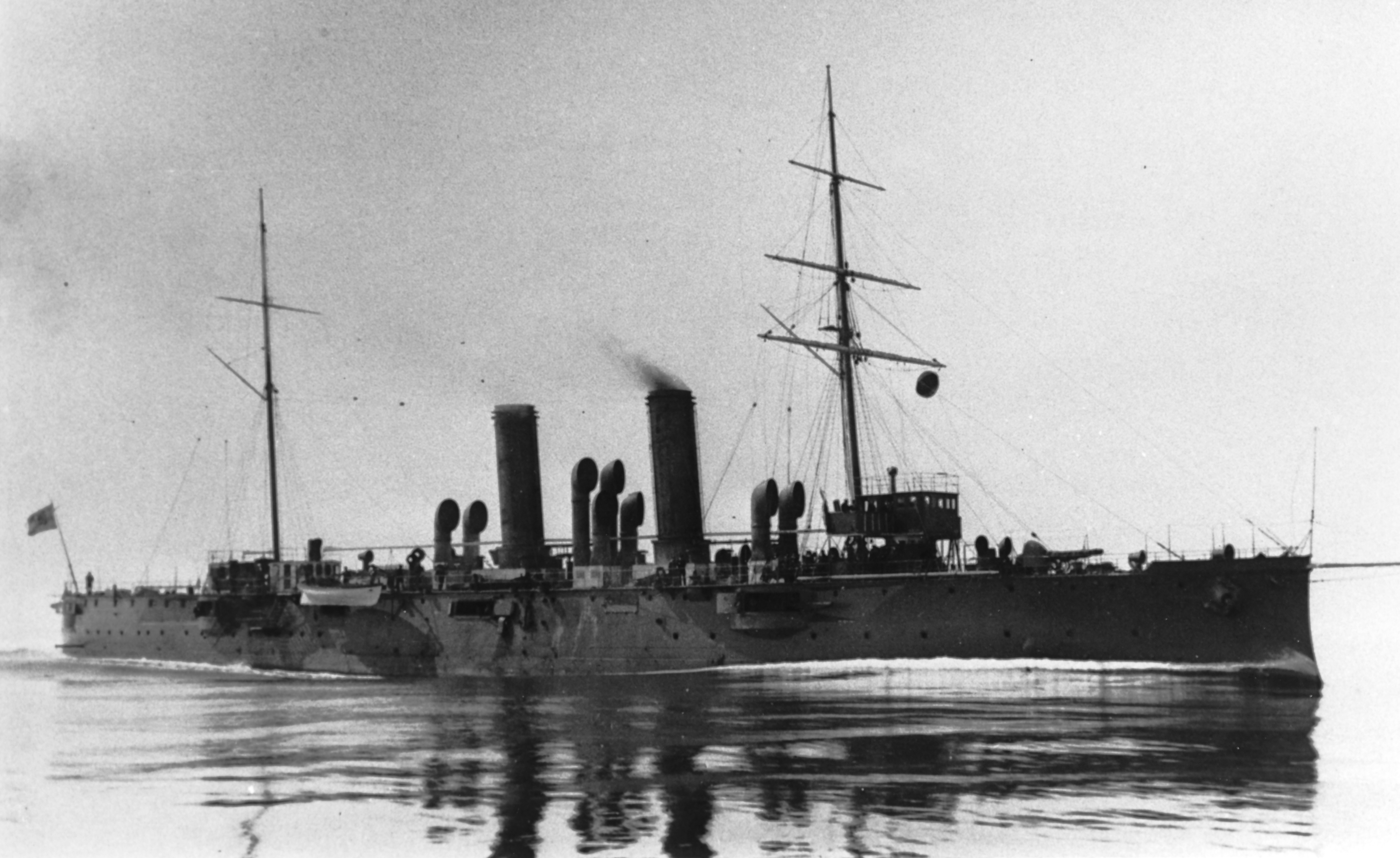
The Austro-Hungarian cruiser SMS Szigetvár

On 15 April 1902 Cestrian arrived in Boston, where the Admiralty chartered her again. On 8 May she left Halifax, Nova Scotia, carrying the 3rd Regiment, Canadian Mounted Rifles and two squadrons of the 4th Regiment, Canadian Mounted Rifles. As she left port, the Austro-Hungarian Navy cruiser SMS Szigetvár dipped her flag in salute. Cestrian called at Cape Town on 30–31 May, and reached Durban on 4 June. None of them saw active service. On 1 July she re-embarked 40 officers and 1,599 men of the 3rd, 4th, 5th and 6th Battalions, Canadian Mounted Rifles; on 2 July she left Point Natal; and on 29 July she reached Halifax.

On 12 September 1902 Cestrian left South Africa carrying 1,880 officers and men. They included 17 officers and 519 men of the 3rd Battalion, the Lincolnshire Regiment; 17 officers and 532 men of the 3rd Battalion, the Essex Regiment; 17 officers and 524 men of the 4th Battalion, the Royal Dublin Fusiliers; three officers and 85 men of U Battery, Royal Horse Artillery; two officers and 66 men of the Royal Field Artillery; one RAMC surgeon, and two civilian surgeons. She called at Queenstown (now Cobh) in Ireland on 2 October, and reached Southampton on 5 October. By 30 October Cestrian was in Boston, back on her regular route.

== 1900s ==
By November 1903 the cargo holds of Cestrian and several other Leyland ships had been fitted with an electric fan ventilation system. This could keep them cool enough to carry cargoes such as apples. It could also be used to keep the holds at a temperature comfortable for cattle. In August 1904 Cestrian carried a record cargo of 1,157 head of cattle.

By 1907 Cestrian seems also to have had some refrigerated capacity, as at Liverpool that November she landed 1,420 boxes of pork; 1,739 boxes of beef; and 1,651 quarters of beef, as well as 899 head of live cattle. On 18 December that year she left New York for London carrying 750 head of cattle and 1,400 quarters of beef. On 3 January 1908 she left London, and on 16 January she arrived in New York again. By August 1908 she was back on her usual route between Liverpool and Boston.

== 1910s ==
By 1910 Cestrian was equipped with wireless telegraphy, supplied and operated by the Marconi Company. In the 1910s Cestrian's work became more varied. In late September or early October 1912 she left Galveston, Texas carrying 24,500 bales of cotton for Liverpool. On 10 October 1913 she left Pensacola, Florida for New Orleans.

On 13 December 1913 Cestrian passed Sand Key heading west into the Gulf of Mexico. On her return west on 24 December she rescued the Master and all eight crew of the British barquentine Malwa, which was foundering in a heavy sea. USRC Miami took the survivors off Cestrian, and on 26 December landed them at Key West, Florida. On 26 December Cestrian passed Sand Key again returning east.

By 1914 Cestrian's wireless call sign was MHL. On 28 March 1914 Cestrian left Liverpool for New York, where she was due on 11 April. On 9 April she radioed to that she was 500 nautical miles (930 km) east of Sandy Hook, New Jersey.

== First World War ==
By 8 August 1914 the Admiralty had either requisitioned or chartered Cestrian for war service. On 2 February 1915 she left New Orleans for Avonmouth carrying about 1,000 jacks to breed mules for war service. Between October 1914 and February 1915, an estimated 7,000 to 8,000 mules had been exported through New Orleans to Britain.

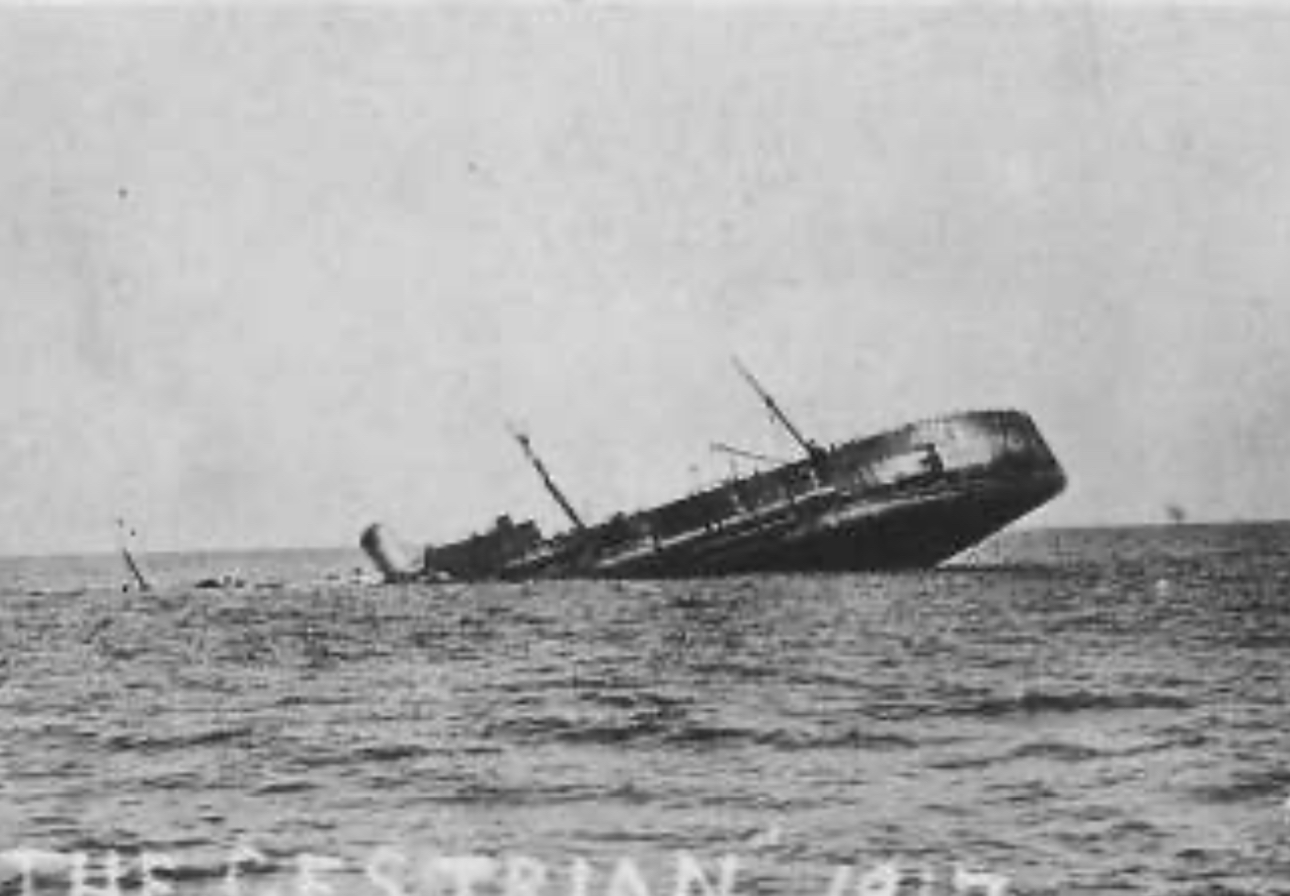
Cestrian sinking after being torpedoed

In June 1917 Cestrian left Salonica (now Thessaloniki) in Greece with horses and 800 troops for Alexandria in Egypt. Two warships escorted her. At 09:30 hrs on 24 June UB-42 torpedoed her in the Aegean 4 nautical miles (7 km) southeast of Skyros, killing her Fourth Engineer and two stokers. "Splendid discipline" ensured that all her troops and the remainder of her crew abandoned ship without further loss of life. She sank at 14:00 hrs.

== Bibliography ==
- Corbett, Julian; Newbolt, Henry (1928). The Naval History of the Great War: Based on Official Documents. Vol. IV. London: Longmans, Green & Co – via Naval-History.net.
- Haws, Duncan (1979). The Ships of the Cunard, American, Red Star, Inman, Leyland, Dominion, Atlantic Transport and White Star lines. Merchant Fleets in Profile. Vol. 2. Cambridge: Patrick Stephens Ltd. ISBN 0-85059-324-7.
- Lloyd's Register of British and Foreign Shipping. Vol. I.–Steamers. London: Lloyd's Register of Shipping. 1896 – via Internet Archive.
- Lloyd's Register of British and Foreign Shipping. Vol. I.–Steamers. London: Lloyd's Register of Shipping. 1910 – via Internet Archive.
- Lloyd's Register of British and Foreign Shipping. Vol. II.–Steamers. London: Lloyd's Register of Shipping. 1912 – via Internet Archive.
- The Marconi Press Agency Ltd (1914). The Year Book of Wireless Telegraphy and Telephony. London: The Marconi Press Agency Ltd.
- Mercantile Navy List. London. 1897 – via Crew List Index Project.
