= SS Armenian =

British steamship sunk in 1915

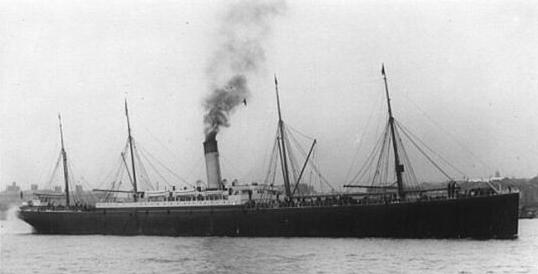
- Armenian

History

United Kingdom
- Name: Armenian
- Namesake: Armenians
- Owner: F Leyland & Co
- Operator: 1903: White Star Line
- Port of registry: Liverpool
- Route: 1895: Liverpool – Boston; 1903: Liverpool – New York
- Builder: Harland & Wolff, Belfast
- Yard number: 292
- Launched: 25 July 1895
- Completed: 19 September 1895
- Maiden voyage: 28 September 1895
- Identification: UK official number 105338; code letters PBVC; by 1914: call sign MYR
- Fate: Sunk by torpedo, 28 June 1915

General characteristics
- Type: Cargo liner
- Tonnage: 8,765 GRT, 5,714 NRT
- Length: 512.5 ft (156.2 m)
- Beam: 59.2 ft (18.0 m)
- Depth: 35.0 ft (10.7 m)
- Decks: 3
- Installed power: 718 NHP
- Propulsion: 1 × triple-expansion engine; 1 × screw
- Sail plan: four-masted schooner
- Speed: 13 knots (24 km/h)
- Crew: 1915: 72 + 96 hostlers
- Notes: sister ships: Victorian, Cestrian

SS Armenian was a British cargo liner that was launched in Ireland in 1895. In her first few years she carried cattle from Boston to Liverpool. From 1903 she carried cattle from New York to Liverpool. Leyland Line owned her throughout her career, but White Star Line managed her from 1903. She carried prisoners of war in the Second Boer War, and horses and mules in the First World War.

A German U-boat sank her in the North Atlantic in 1915, killing 29 people. The victims included 23 United States citizens, which prompted much comment in the US. Armenian was sunk less than two months after the sinking of RMS Lusitania, whose 1,195 victims included 123 US citizens. However, RMS Lusitania was an ocean liner with 1,300 passengers, whereas Armenian was a cargo ship carrying mules for the Entente Powers' war effort. The US citizens aboard her were not passengers, but hostlers hired to care for the mules.

The US Government continued to disagree with the way that the Imperial German Navy engaged Entente or neutral merchant ships, but also accepted that the U-boat was entitled to attack as Armenian had tried to flee instead of stopping to be searched.

== Building and registration ==
In 1895 Harland & Wolff in Belfast launched three cargo liners for Frederick Leyland & Co. Yard number 291 was launched on 6 July as Victorian, and completed on 31 August. Yard number 292 was laid down as Indian, but launched on 25 July as Armenian, and completed on 19 September. Yard number 296 was launched on 21 September as Cestrian, and completed on 5 March 1896.

Armenian's registered length was 512.5 ft (156.2 m), her beam was 59.2 ft (18.0 m), and her depth was 35.0 ft (10.7 m). Her tonnages were 8,765 GRT and 5,714 NRT. When new, Victorian, Armenian, and Cestrian were noted for being of "exceptionally large tonnage" among newly built ships, second only to White Star Line's Georgic. Armenian had a single screw, driven by a three-cylinder triple-expansion engine that was rated at 718 NHP and gave her a speed of 13 knots (24 km/h). She also had four masts, and could be rigged as a schooner.

Leyland registered Armenian at Liverpool. Her United Kingdom official number was 105338 and her code letters were PBVC.

== 1895 to 1899 ==
On 28 September 1895 Armenian left Liverpool on her maiden voyage. She met continuous bad weather from 29 September, and on 10 October she reached Boston. In January 1896 she left Boston carrying 10,424 bales of cotton. At the time it was the largest consignment of cotton ever shipped there.

On 2 February 1899 the British steamship Hurona left England for Portland, Maine. She met a series of storms, and on 14 February her rudder broke down. She set a small amount of sail, and anchored 60 nautical miles (110 km) off Sable Island. The next day the weather moderated, and she tried to get underway, but made little progress. On 16 February Armenian sighted Hurona 150 nautical miles (280 km) southwest of Halifax, Nova Scotia. Hurona accepted Armenian's offer of a tow, and on 17 February the pair reached Halifax.

== Boer War ==
On 2 October 1899 the Admiralty chartered Armenian as Transport number 25 for the Second Boer War. At Tilbury in Essex on 23 October she embarked elements of the Royal Field Artillery (RFA), including three batteries, one ammunition train, and the Brigade Divisional Staff. She also embarked a troop of Royal Engineers and a detachment of the Royal Army Medical Corps (RAMC). She called at Cape Town in Cape Colony on 13 November, and reached Durban in Natal on 16 November. On 1 December Armenian had a minor collision with the Castle Line steamship Roslin Castle. On 4 December she was returned to her owners. The Admiralty paid £45,577 for chartering, port dues and bunkering.

On 28 December 1900 Leyland announced that it would start a new weekly service between Liverpool and New York, using six ships including Armenian. However, on 3 January 1900 the Admiralty chartered her a second time. On the afternoon of 8 February she left Southampton carrying 24 officers, 500 men, and 475 horses of the 7th Dragoon Guards; 100 men of the 2nd Battalion, the Northamptonshire Regiment; a company the Army Service Corps; and a company of the RAMC. By 17 February she had called at São Vicente, Cape Verde, and on 1 March she reached Cape Town. On 9 April Armenian reached Sydney, New South Wales. On 23 April she embarked 750 officers and men and 800 horses of the New South Wales Imperial Bushmen. On 9 August Armenian left Tilbury carrying nine officers, 303 men and 900 horses. They included the 2nd Battalion, the King's Own (Royal Lancaster Regiment); 50 men of the 10th Royal Hussars; 124 men of the Black Watch; 51 men of the 13th Hussars; and 50 men of the Seaforth Highlanders. On 10 August she called at Southampton, where she embarked 120 men of the Gordon Highlanders and the 1st Battalion, the Highland Light Infantry; and 70 horses. By 7 September she had reached Table Bay in Cape Colony. On 15 September she left for England carrying six army officers, three civilians, a chaplain, and a nurse. On 24 September she called at Saint Helena.

On New Year's Day 1901 in Durban Armenian embarked the 1st Battalion, the Devonshire Regiment, and the next day she embarked the 2nd Battalion, the Gordon Highlanders. On 18 January she arrived in Bombay (now Mumbai) in India, and disembarked both battalions. In 1901 she was briefly a prison ship for Boer prisoners of war (PoWs) in Simon's Town in Cape Colony. On 29 May 1901 she left Cape Town carrying 963 Boer PoWs, guarded by four officers and 184 men of the 2nd Battalion, the Warwickshire Regiment. She was due to call at São Vicente on 20 June, and she landed her PoWs on Bermuda on 28 June. On 22 July she reached Southampton, where she disambarked six officers and 93 men. On 22 August she left Tilbury carrying more than 8,000 tons of oats. On 21 September she left Durban carrying 1,017 Boer PoWs to India. On 3 November she left Durban with more than 1,017 Boer PoWs: 36 officers and 981 men, escorted by two RFA batteries. On 15 November she called at the Seychelles, and on 26 November she reached Bombay.

On 2 January 1902 Armenian left Durban carrying 15 officers, one warrant officer and 694 men of the 2nd Battalion, the Gordon Highlanders, and 16 officers and 916 men of the 1st Battalion, the Devonshire Regiment. On 19 January she reached Bombay. On 25 January she left Bombay carrying elements of the 2nd Battalion, the Royal Inniskilling Fusiliers, and 150 men of the Oxfordshire and Buckinghamshire Light Infantry. On 6 February she reached Durban. Also in 1902 she took another 150 prisoners of war to India. On 2 May the War Office announced that it would send another 10,000 officers and men and 2,000 horses to South Africa in 14 ships. Armenian was scheduled to leave Southampton on 10 May carrying 1,657 troops, including 250 men for Saint Helena. Instead, on 9 May she was returned to her owners. She had repatriated a total of 139 officers, 6,441 NCOs and men, and 27 horses. The Admiralty paid £298,643 for chartering, port dues, and bunkering.

== 1902 to 1912 ==
Armenian returned to her route between Liverpool and Boston. On 3 December 1902 she was due to leave Boston carrying 650 head of cattle and 1,000 sheep. However, on 28 November James Wilson, United States Secretary of Agriculture, suspended all livestock shipments through Boston for two months to suppress an outbreak of foot-and-mouth disease. Leyland's agent in Boston said she would sail without cattle.

From May 1903 White Star Line managed Armenian and her sister ship Victorian. The pair were transferred to White Star's route between Liverpool and New York, where its terminal was Pier 48 on the North River. Sailings left New York for Liverpool on alternate Tuesdays, and included a call at Queenstown (now Cobh) in Ireland.

In June 1908 White Star Line suspended its New York cargo and livestock service from New York for three months. This was due partly to transcontinental railroads setting freight rates that disadvantaged that port, and partly to the depressed level of trade. White Star laid up Armenian, Victorian, and three other ships until the service resumed in September.

By 1912 Armenian was equipped with wireless telegraphy, supplied and operated by the Marconi Company. By 1914 her wireless call sign was MYR.

== Abessinia incident ==
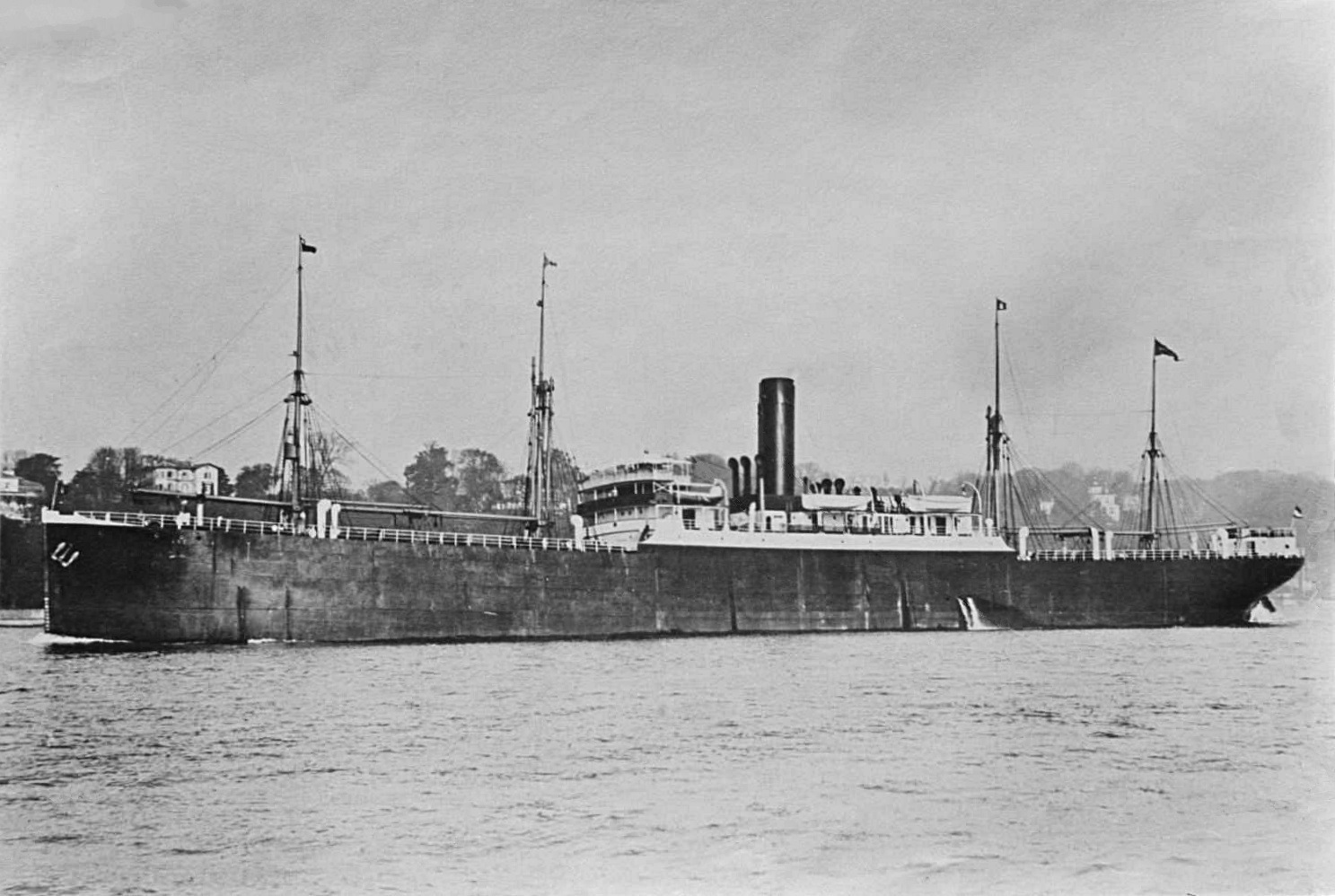
HAPAG's Abessinia

In a storm in the North Atlantic on 2 January 1913 the Hamburg America Line (HAPAG) steamship Abessinia lost her rudder; broke either her propeller shaft or crankshaft (sources differ); and was drifting. On 11 January the White Star Liner RMS Cedric sighted Abessinia at position 42°40′N 53°21′W, about 100 nautical miles (190 km) southwest of Cape Race, flying distress signal flags. Cedric was unable to tow Abessinia, but stood by her and signalled for help by wireless telegraph. Armenian received the signal, and Cedric resumed her course.

Armenian steamed 29 or 50 nautical miles (54 or 93 km) (accounts differ) to Abessinia's position, but took five hours to arrive due to rough weather. Armenian then encountered fog, in which she was unable to find Abessinia. By midnight on 12 January Armenian was still searching. Armenian fired signal rockets and burned light signals, but received nor reply from Abessinia, so Armenian resumed her course.

On 14 January the liner Minnetonka reported that HAPAG's Pisa would look for Abessinia and take her in tow. However, Abessinia's crew rigged an emergency rudder and repaired whichever shaft had broken, which enabled her to proceed slowly under her own power. On 15 January she reached Halifax, Nova Scotia unaided.

== First World War ==
After the First World War began in 1914, Armenian was laid up for a few weeks. She then made trips from Newport News, Virginia to Liverpool; from New Orleans to Avonmouth; and from New York to Avonmouth and Cardiff.

On 17 June 1915 Armenian left Newport News carrying 1,422 mules for the French Army, and 1,771 bales of hay and other fodder. She carried a crew of 72, plus 96 hostlers to care for the mules. Her officers and some of her crew were British; her ships's doctor was Puerto Rican; and 87 of the hostlers were US citizens – most of them African Americans. Her crew included other nationalities, including Norwegians. Her destination was Avonmouth in the Bristol Channel. She was unarmed.

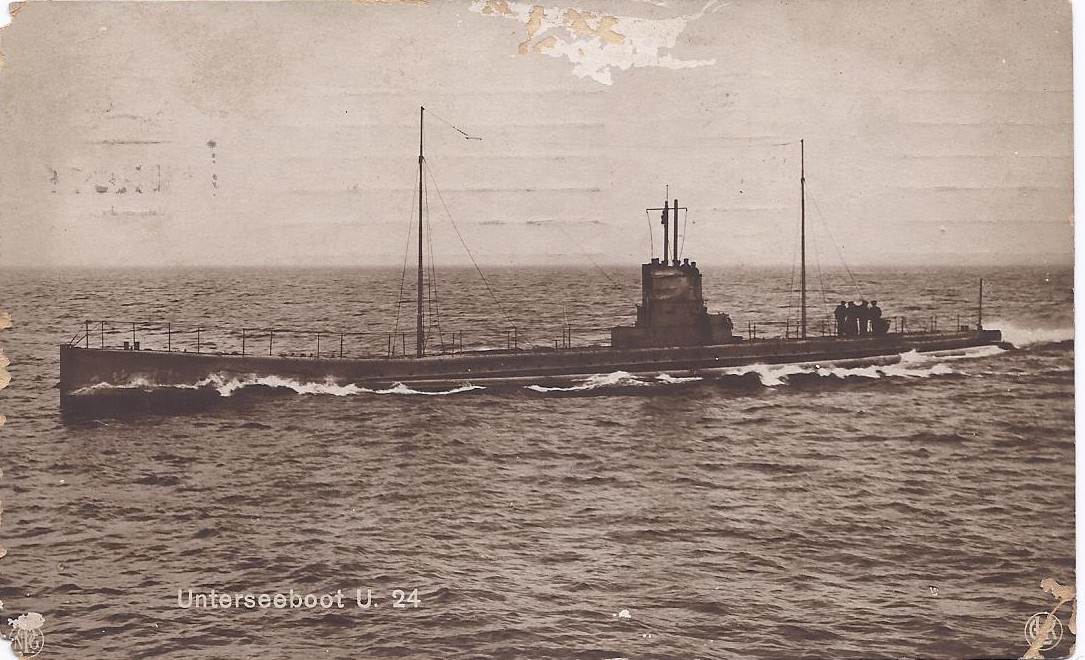
SM U-24

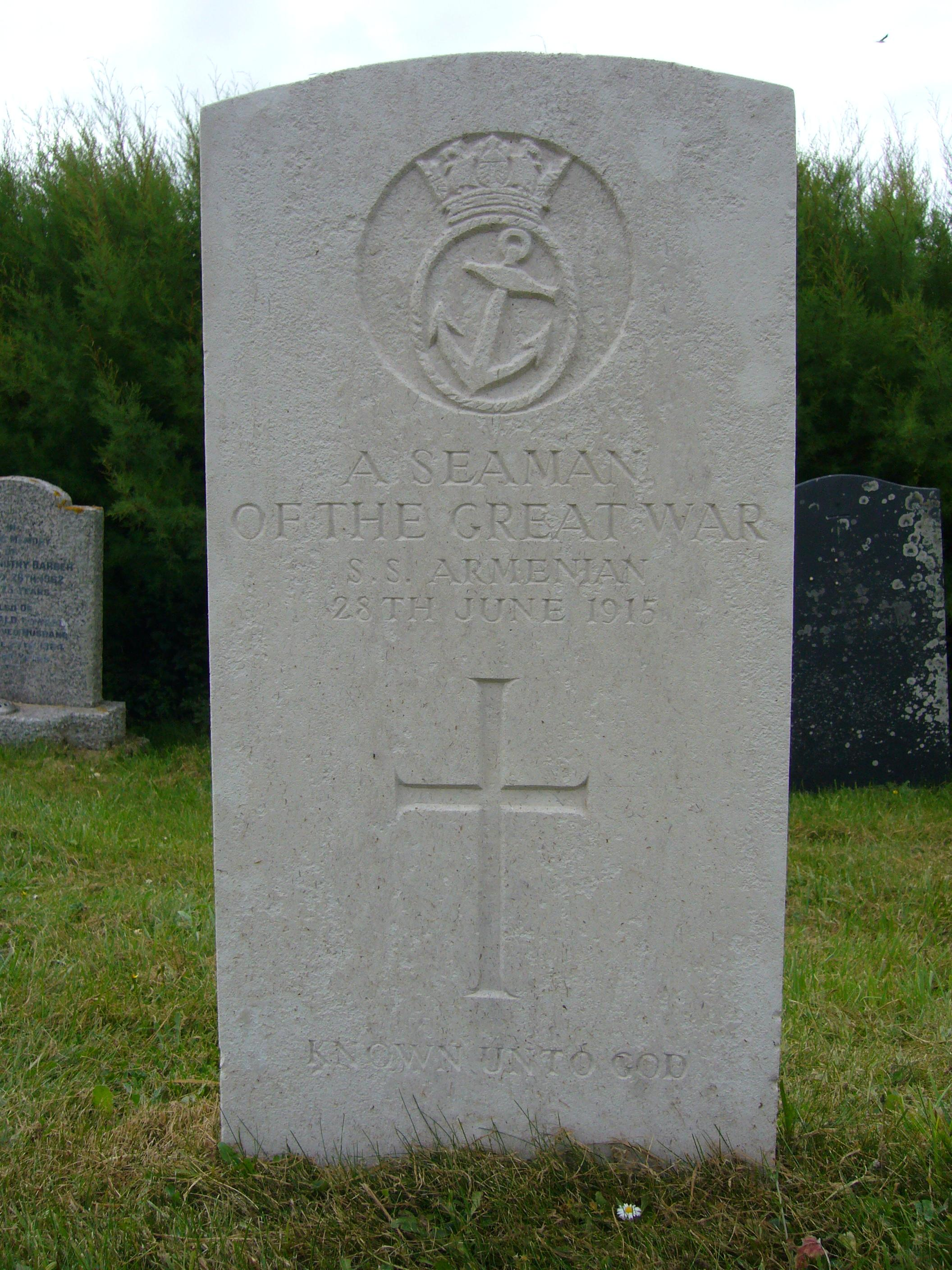
Grave of an unknown sailor from the SS Armenian at St Enodoc's Church, Trebetherick. The date of death is 28 June 1915 - the same date the ship was attacked and sunk

At about 18:48 hrs on 28 June, Armenian was in the Southwestern Approaches about 20 nautical miles (37 km) west of Trevose Head, Cornwall, when her helmsman sighted U-24 on the surface about 4 nautical miles (7 km) away. The U-boat fired two warning shots with her deck gun across Armenian's bow, indicating that the ship should stop. Armenian's Master, Captain James Trickey, ordered his ship to turn her stern to the submarine, and telegraphed the engine room for full speed ahead. He also ordered the crew to prepare her lifeboats, ready to be lowered quickly if required.

U-24 then shelled Armenian and closed on her. The first shell hit her starboard quarter and killed ten men. One of Armenian's Marconi wireless officers transmitted a distress signal, but then a shell destroyed her wireless cabin. Other shells smashed her engine room skylight, destroyed her funnel, and disabled her steering gear. One shot cut one of the falls of her number 3 lifeboat, leaving it hanging from the other davit. U-24 fired a total of about 20 shells. Fires started in three places on the ship. After a chase of an hour or two Armenian hove to, and gave three blasts of her whistle to signal her surrender.

At least two lifeboats capsized either while being launched or shortly afterward, throwing their occupants into the sea. Five lifeboats were launched successfully. They rescued some of the men in the sea, but did not manage to reach all of them. U-24 rescued three men, including the ship's doctor. The U-boat then hit Armenian with two torpedoes, and she sank at 20:07 hrs at position 50°40′N 06°24′W. 13 men aboard Armenian were killed before Captain Trickey surrendered, and others were wounded. Four men in the lifeboat commanded by Captain Trickey died of their wounds and were buried at sea. The total number of deaths was 29. 23 of them were US citizens, including 14 African-Americans.

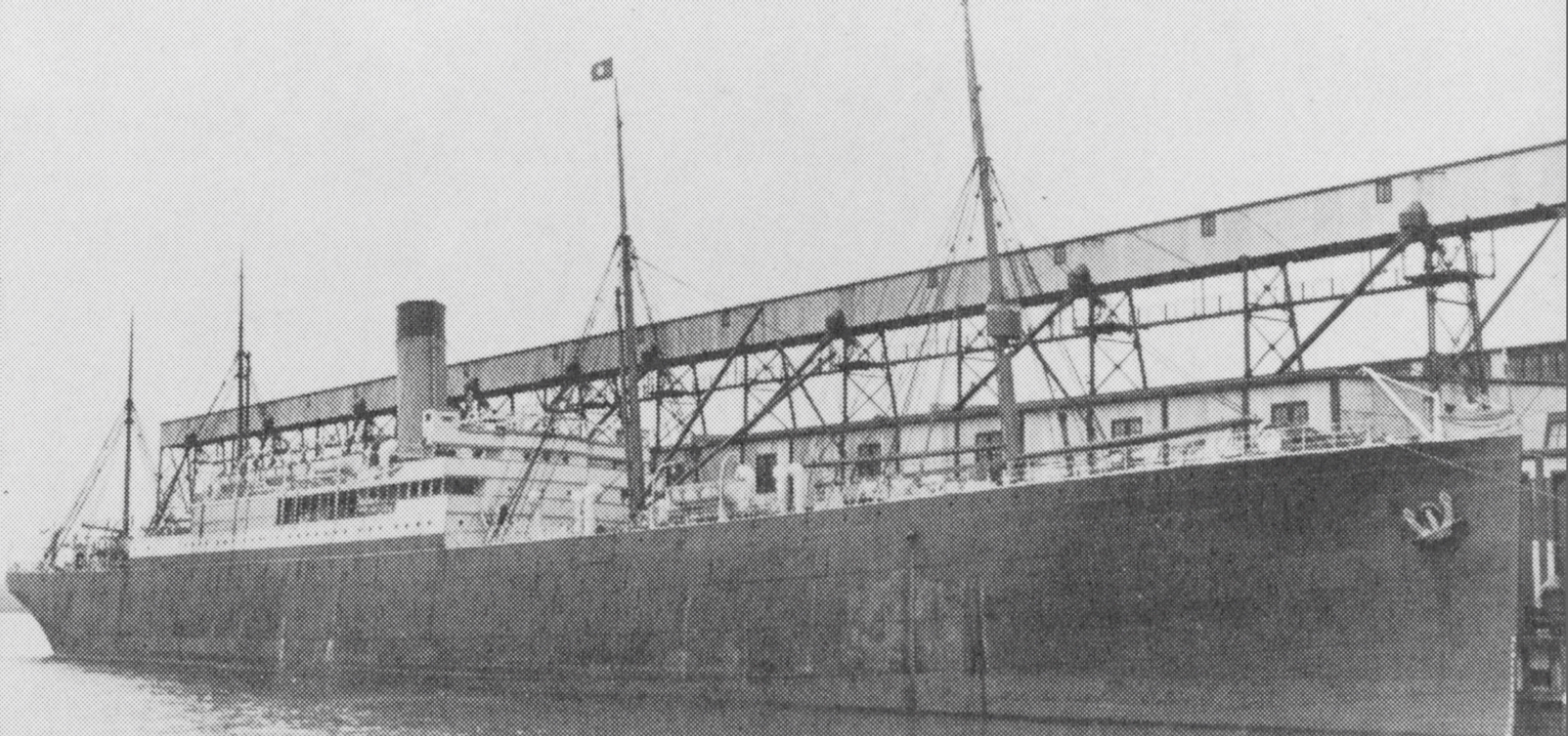
Leyland's Winifredian

The next morning the Belgian steam trawler President Stevens rescued the occupants of the five lifeboats. She transferred them to two British vessels. Most of the survivors were landed at Avonmouth, except for six who were landed at Cardiff. On 2 July, 60 US survivors left Avonmouth aboard Leyland ships to return to the US: 56 aboard Winifredian and four aboard Victorian. Victorian reached Newport News on 13 July.

== Context and consequences ==
J. P. Morgan's International Mercantile Marine Company held a controlling 52 percent of Leyland Line stock. Armenian was thus 52 percent US-owned. However, President Woodrow Wilson reacted cautiously, as Armenian was carrying cargo for the Entente war armed forces, and had tried to escape instead of heaving to when U-24 ordered her to do so. Armenian's sinking was likened to that of another British ship, Falaba, on 28 March. 111 of Falaba's passengers and crew were killed, including one US citizen, which gave rise to the Thrasher incident. Falaba, like Armenian, had tried to flee instead of stopping when ordered to do so. Germany's diplomatic response did not satisfy US Secretary of State Robert Lansing, but he continued to negotiate for Germany to make an "amicable adjustment" to conduct its submarine warfare according to international law.

After Armenian was sunk, two other Leyland ships tried to escape from U-boats. Anglo-Californian was shelled on 4 July 1915, and 21 people including her Master were killed, but she succeeded in fleeing to Queenstown (now Cobh) in Ireland. Iberian was shelled on 30 July, her attempt to escape failed, and she was sunk by torpedo. Seven of her crew were killed, including one US citizen. The US Government still sought to persuade Germany always to stop and search merchant ships instead of attacking them. To this end, the US accepted that if a merchant captain refused to stop, he did so at the risk of his ship and all persons aboard her.

On 8 July Labor's National Peace Council protested to Lansing that the US was violating its neutrality by supplying the Entente with items including munitions, vehicles, submarine parts, horses, and mules. They contended that Armenian had violated US neutrality, and Newport News' Collector of Customs should not have cleared her to leave. It called on the US government to stop seven merchant ships that were then preparing to sail from the US to France or the UK, including three whose cargo was horses or mules.

By the time Armenian was sunk, an estimated two million horses and mules had been shipped from Newport News to the Entente Powers, and another 100,000 were due to be shipped in the ensuing three months. On 1 July the British steamship Turcoman was in the Western Approaches with a cargo of mules, and Indore was leaving Newport News for Avonmouth with another load. All of Indore's hostlers were African-American, overseen by white foremen and assistant foremen.

== Wreck ==
In 2002 divers discovered a shipwreck that they believed to be Armenian. One said "There were an awful lot of bones", and another said "the mule bones provided the easiest means of identifying the wreck. They were everywhere." However, the wreck they found may have been the armed boarding steamer HMS Patia. In 2008 marine archaeologist Innes McCartney found Armenian, using German naval archives from Freiburg im Breisgau to determine the search area. The wreck is on an even keel on the seabed, at a depth of 312 feet (95 m), 45 nautical miles (83 km) from the position where the British had reported it sunk.

== Bibliography ==
- Benbow, Colin (1994) [1962]. Boer Prisoners of War in Bermuda (2nd ed.). Hamilton, Bermuda: Bermuda Historical Society. ISBN 978-0969789307.
- Haws, Duncan (1979). The Ships of the Cunard, American, Red Star, Inman, Leyland, Dominion, Atlantic Transport and White Star lines. Merchant Fleets in Profile. Vol. 2. Cambridge: Patrick Stephens Ltd. ISBN 0-85059-324-7.
- Lloyd's Register of British and Foreign Shipping. Vol. I.–Steamers. London: Lloyd's Register of Shipping. 1896 – via Internet Archive.
- Lloyd's Register of British and Foreign Shipping. Vol. II.–Steamers. London: Lloyd's Register of Shipping. 1912 – via Internet Archive.
- The Marconi Press Agency Ltd (1914). The Year Book of Wireless Telegraphy and Telephony. London: The Marconi Press Agency Ltd.
- Mercantile Navy List. London. 1896 – via Crew List Index Project.
