= SS Abessinia (1900) =

German steamship and British recreational dive site

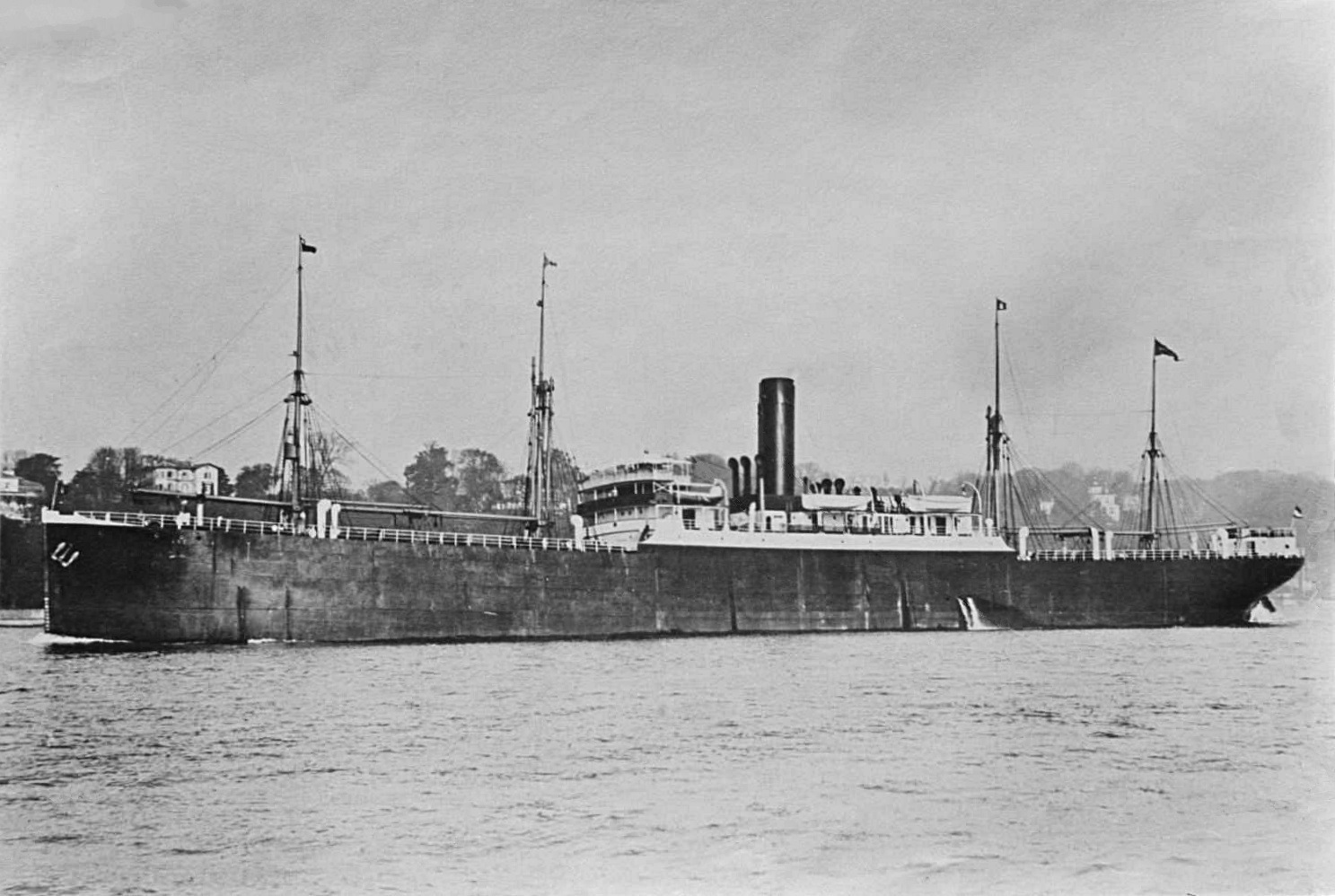
- Abessinia under way

History

Germany
- Name: Abessinia
- Namesake: Abyssinia
- Owner: Hamburg America Line
- Port of registry: Hamburg
- Route: 1907: Hamburg – Seattle
- Builder: Palmers' S&I Co, Jarrow
- Yard number: 746
- Launched: 16 June 1900
- Completed: August 1900
- Identification: code letters RLSJ
- Fate: wrecked 3 September 1921

General characteristics
- Type: cargo ship
- Tonnage: 7,717 GRT, 5,784 NRT
- Length: 452.1 ft (137.8 m)
- Beam: 52.2 ft (15.9 m)
- Depth: 28.3 ft (8.6 m)
- Decks: 2
- Installed power: 642 NHP
- Propulsion: 1 × triple-expansion engine; 1 × screw
- Speed: 11 1/2 knots (21 km/h)
- Notes: sister ships: Acilia, Alexandria, Artemisia

SS Abessinia was a cargo steamship of the Hamburg America Line (HAPAG). She was built in North East England in 1900, and wrecked in North East England in 1921. In her early years she sailed from Hamburg to and from China, Australia, and the East Coast of the United States. From 1907 to 1912 she sailed from Hamburg to and from the West Coast of the United States and the British Columbia Coast. In 1913 she survived a storm in the North Atlantic that swept away her rudder and disabled her propulsion. She spent the First World War in Chile. Her remains are now a wreck diving site in the Farne Islands.

This was the first of two HAPAG steamships to be called Abessinia, the German for Abyssinia. The second was built in Germany in 1920, and sold and renamed in 1933.

== Building and registration ==
In 1900 and 1901 Palmers Shipbuilding and Iron Company in Jarrow, County Durham, built a set of four sister ships for HAPAG. Yard number 746 was launched on 16 June 1900 as Abessinia and completed that August. Yard number 747 was launched on 24 September 1900 as Acilia and completed that October. Yard number 748 was launched on 22 November 1900 as Alexandria and completed that December. Yard number 749 was launched on 21 January 1901 and completed as Artemisia.

Abessinia's registered length was 452.1 ft (137.8 m), her beam was 52.2 ft (15.9 m), and her depth was 28.3 ft (8.6 m). Her tonnages were 7,717 GRT and 5,784 NRT. She had a single screw, driven by a three-cylinder triple-expansion engine that was rated at 642 NHP and gave her a speed of 11 1/2 knots (21 km/h). She had one funnel and four masts.

HAPAG registered Abessinia at Hamburg. Her code letters were RLSJ.

== Early years ==
In 1901 HAPAG bought the Yangtse Line from Rickmers. One of Abessinia's first voyages was to Shanghai. On 4 January 1901 she left Shanghai, and on 22 January she reached Sydney, New South Wales, making her the first HAPAG ship to trade with Australia. On 6 February she moved from Woolloomooloo to Pyrmont. She loaded cargo including 10,529 bales of wool, 7,894 bags of wheat, and 1,000 tons of iron ore, for Antwerp, Bremen, and Hamburg, and left Sydney on 9 February. On 11 February she reached Melbourne, where she loaded cargo including 9,000 bags of wheat for Bremen and other ports, and sailed on 18 February for Europe.

On 6 February 1902 Abessinia left Hamburg, and on 20 February she arrived in Portland, Maine. There The Portland Daily Press said of her "The German ship is one of the handsomest that has been here this winter and caused much favorable comment around the wharves". She returned to Hamburg via a call at Boston on 25 February.

On 17 April 1902 Abessinia arrived in New York carrying a wide range of animals that Carl Hagenbeck was exporting from Hamburg to customers including Ringling Brothers Circus, Cincinnati Zoo, Bronx Zoo, and several animal dealers. The cargo included 81 baboons, 79 monkeys, 12 elephants, 12 horses, nine big cats, four camels, six deer, one wildebeest, one sable antelope, one polar bear, and various birds.

On 20 September 1906 Abessinia left New Orleans for Hamburg.

== Pacific joint service with DDG Kosmos ==
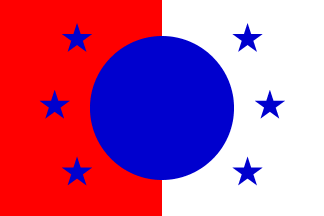
DDG Kosmos house flag

HAPAG ran a joint freight service to the Pacific coast of North and South America via Cape Horn, in partnership with DDG Kosmos. By January 1907 Abessinia was on this service. She called at Valparaíso in Chile, where she embarked four passengers for San Francisco. On 21 February she left Callao in Peru. She took 1,600 Salvadoran troops from Acajutla in El Salvador to Amapala in Honduras. She called at a port in Guatemala, where she loaded 60,000 bags of coffee and 500 tons of sugar. She was due to leave the Mexican Islas San Benito on 4 April. On 18 April she reached San Francisco to disembark her passengers from Valparaíso and discharge her cargo. At the time, it was the largest amount of coffee yet brought to San Francisco by a single ship; three times the size of the largest consignment ever landed in that port hitherto. On 30 April she left San Francisco for Seattle. On her return voyage she called at San Francisco from 3 to 7 June.

In late 1907 Abessinia left London for San Francisco. On 18 January 1908 she called at Punta Arenas in southern Chile. On 16 March she left Callao. She brought 18,000 barrels of cement from Europe; loaded a cargo of coffee in Central America; reached San Francisco by 20 April; and had moved from Seattle to Tacoma by 30 April. On her return voyage she called at San Francisco from 10 to 14 May, bound for Antwerp.

In May 1910 Abessinia left Hamburg, and that September she reached Salina Cruz in Mexico. There she loaded 4,000 tons of express cargo from Europe that was destined for San Francisco and Puget Sound, and cargo from New York that was destined for Victoria, British Columbia. The Ferrocarril Transístmico had brought the freight overland from ports on the Gulf of Mexico. Abessinia was already part-laden with cargo from Europe that she had brought around Cape Horn. On 25 September she left Salina Cruz with more than 7,000 tons of cargo. She called at Mazatlán in Baja California, and on 6 October reached San Francisco, 146 days out from Hamburg. On 15 November she left San Francisco on her return voyage to Hamburg.

In March 1911 Abessinia left Hamburg, and on 17 April she passed Fernando de Noronha off the northeast tip of Brazil. On 13 July she left Guayaquil in Ecuador. She called at Los Angeles, and on 7 August reached San Francisco, 144 days out from Hamburg. On 11 August she left San Francisco for Seattle and Tacoma. On 15 December she reached Hamburg, but ran aground in the Elbe.

Abessinia was refloated, and on 16 January 1912 left Hamburg. She passed São Vicente, Cape Verde on 9 February; called at Los Angeles from 27 to 28 April; and was due in San Francisco on 30 April. On 6 May she left San Francisco for Victoria, BC. She called at Bellingham, Washington, and on 20 May reached Seattle.

== Disabled in the Atlantic ==
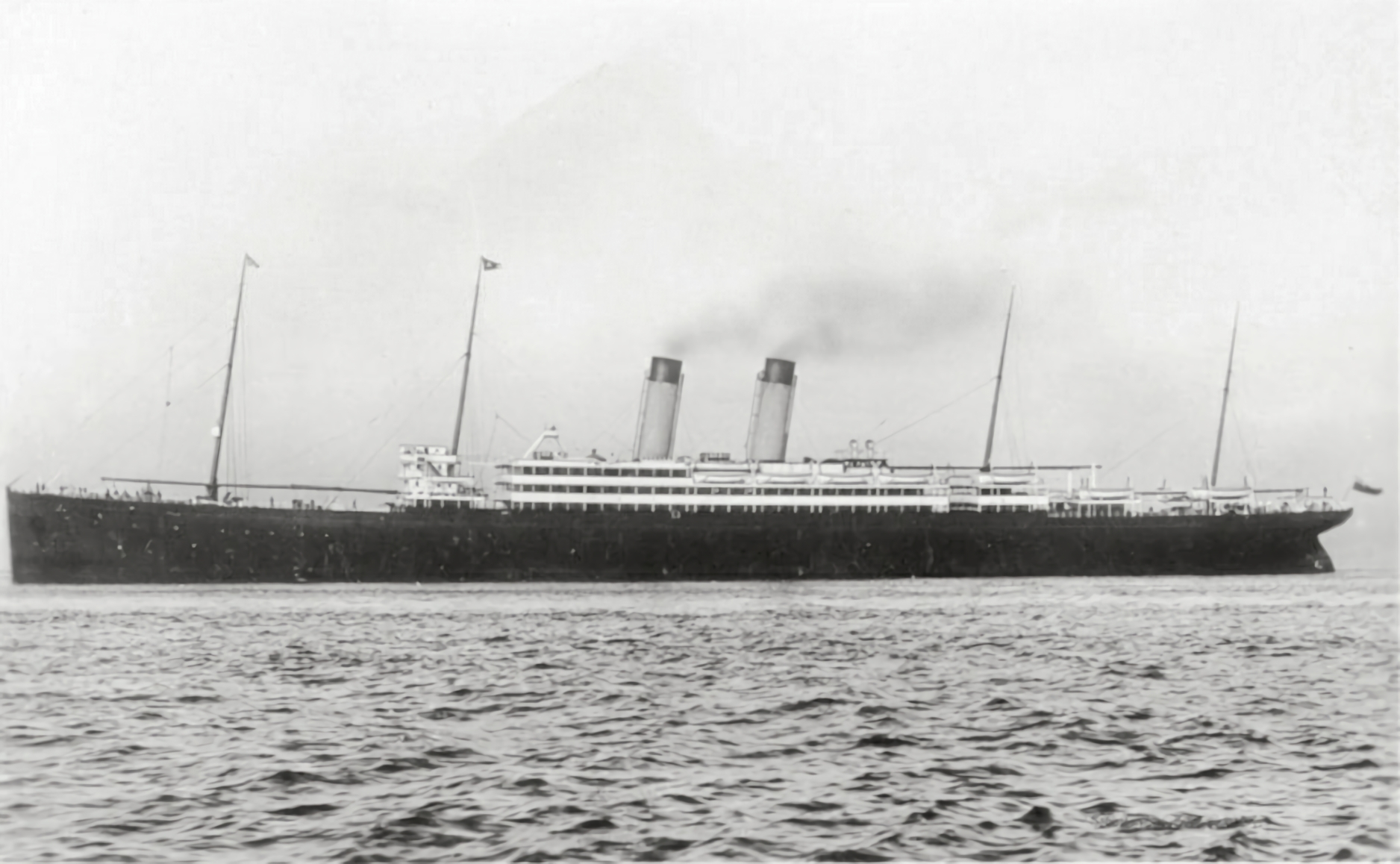
White Star Line's RMS Cedric

In a storm in the North Atlantic on 2 January 1913 Abessinia lost her rudder; broke either her propeller shaft or crankshaft (sources differ); and was drifting. On 11 January the White Star Liner RMS Cedric sighted Abessinia at position 42°40′N 53°21′W, about 100 nautical miles (190 km) southwest of Cape Race, flying distress signal flags. Cedric was unable to tow Abessinia, but stood by her and signalled for help by wireless telegraph. Leyland Line's Armenian received the signal, and Cedric resumed her course.

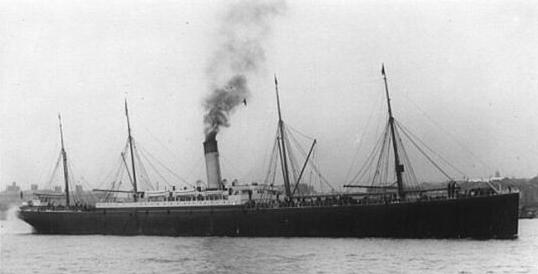
Leyland Line's Armenian

Armenian steamed 29 or 50 nautical miles (54 or 93 km) (accounts differ) to Abessinia's position, but took five hours to arrive due to rough weather. Armenian then encountered fog, in which she was unable to find Abessinia. By midnight on 12 January Armenian was still searching. Armenian fired signal rockets and burned light signals, but received nor reply from Abessinia, so Armenian resumed her course.

On 14 January the liner Minnetonka reported that HAPAG's Pisa would look for Abessinia and take her in tow. However, Abessinia's crew rigged an emergency rudder and repaired whichever shaft had broken, which enabled her to proceed slowly under her own power. On 15 January she reached Halifax, Nova Scotia unaided.

== First World War ==
When the First World War began in August 1914, Abessinia took refuge in Callao in neutral Peru. On 9 October 1914 she left Callao, reportedly to be escorted by the German cruiser SMS Leipzig. She then took refuge in Pisagua in northern Chile.

== Loss ==
In 1918 her crew sabotaged her machinery in an attempt to make her useless to the Entente Powers. In 1920 she was towed to Hamburg, where she arrived on 3 August. In 1921 she sailed from Hamburg, bound for Leith in Scotland. She was to be surrendered as World War I reparations under Article 231 of the Treaty of Versailles. On 3 September 1921 she grounded on Knivestone Reef off Longstone Lighthouse in the Farne Islands. All of her crew survived. When the tide receded, she was left on the reef with her keel plates out of the water. She then toppled off the reef into the sea.

== Wreck ==
Abessinia's wreck is at position 55°39.950′N 001°36.049′W at a depth of 59 to 66 feet (18 to 20 m). It is one of the largest shipwrecks in the Farnes, and is popular with recreational divers. The wreck is much broken up, and is only one of several shipwrecks around the Knivestone, so it is possible to confuse parts of Abessinia with parts of other ships. Marine life in and around Abessinia includes seals, starfish, brittle stars, sponges, crabs, lobsters, and fish including wolf eels.

== Bibliography ==
- Gardner, Barry (2016). Ross to Beadnell, including Seahouses, Bamburgh & the Farne Islands. United Kingdom Shipwrecks and Incidents. Vol. 3. CreateSpace Independent Publishing. ISBN 978-1540831811.
- Haws, Duncan (1980). The Ships of the Hamburg America, Adler and Carr Lines. Merchant Fleets in Profile. Vol. 4. Cambridge: Patrick Stephens Ltd. ISBN 0-85059-397-2.
- Lloyd's Register of British and Foreign Shipping. Vol. I.–Steamers. London: Lloyd's Register of Shipping. 1901 – via Internet Archive.
