= Leyland Line =

British shipping transport company (1873–1935)

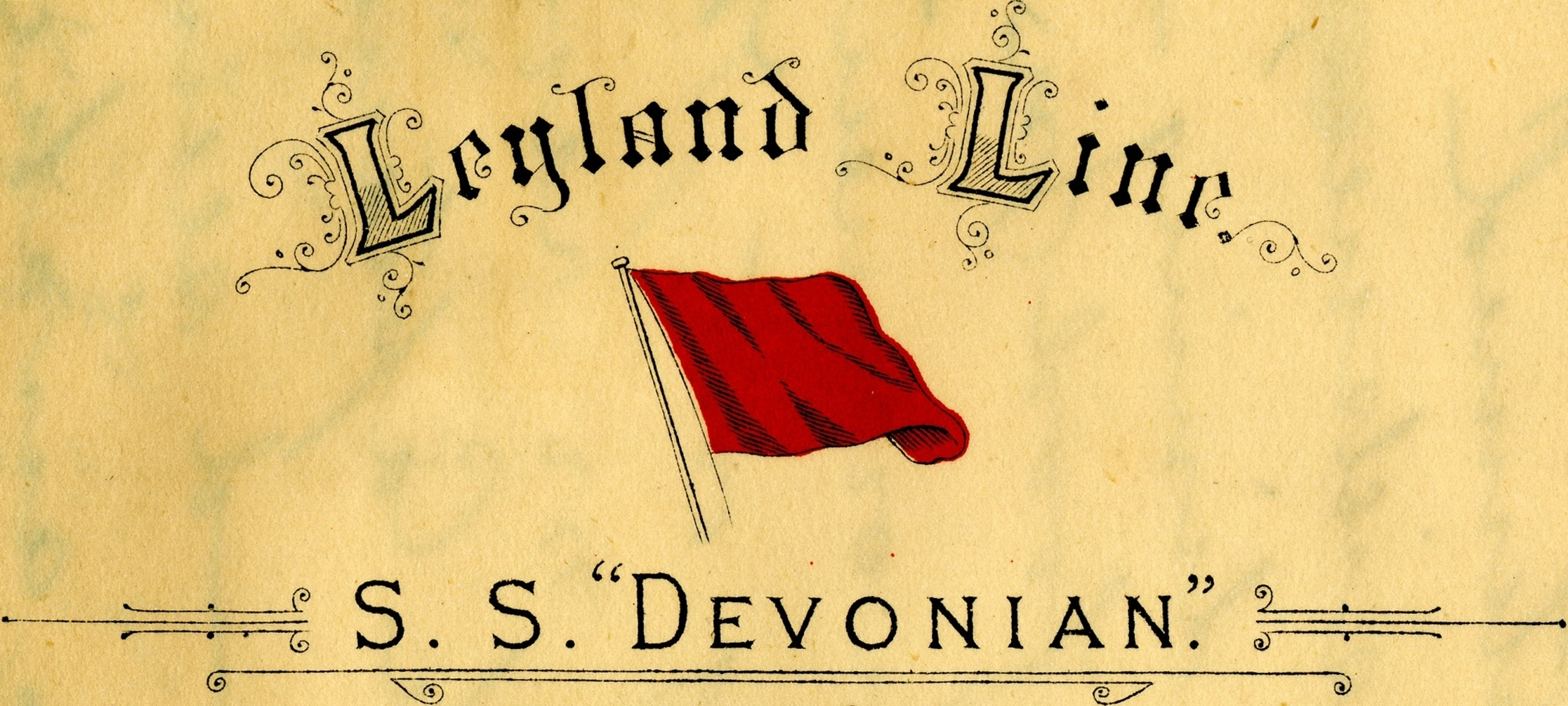
- Logo on SS Devonian stationary
- Industry: Shipping and transportation
- Founded: 1873; 153 years ago
- Founder: Frederick Richards Leyland
- Defunct: 1935
- Fate: Liquidated
- Area served: North Atlantic
- Footnotes First house flag Second house flag

The Frederick Leyland & Co Ltd, usually referred to as the Leyland Line, was a British shipping transport line founded in 1873 by Frederick Richards Leyland after his apprenticeship in the firm of John Bibby, Sons & Co. After Frederick Leyland's death, the company was taken over by Sir John Ellerman in 1892. In 1902, the company was bought by the International Mercantile Marine Company and a portion of its fleet was withdrawn from service and transferred to the Ellerman Lines. The company was liquidated in 1935 after a period of declining influence due to the Great Depression.

== History ==
=== Early history ===
Frederick Leyland was a longtime partner in John Bibby, Sons & Co which was based in Liverpool. In 1873 the Bibby family withdrew from the shipping business and Leyland set up his own shipping company. As the company was established in 1873, 21 former Bibby ships formed the basic equipment of Leyland's new company of cargo ships. The new company was officially called F. Leyland & Co. Ltd, but the name Leyland Line soon became established. Also inherited from the Bibby Line was the tradition of giving all ships a name ending in "-ian" or "-ean", and the funnel painted pink with a black top.

The shipping company initially operated with a liner service to the Mediterranean, in 1875 the transatlantic service was opened with routes ran from Liverpool to Boston, Philadelphia and Portland. New York City was only occasionally called upon. The ships used by the shipping company were mainly cargo ships, some of which had few passenger facilities that only had transport for emigrants. The liner services developed well and the shipping company became the largest transatlantic freighter line. in 1888, Leyland retired from his active business leaving his son, Frederick Dawson Leyland, in charge of the line.

=== Under John Ellermann ===
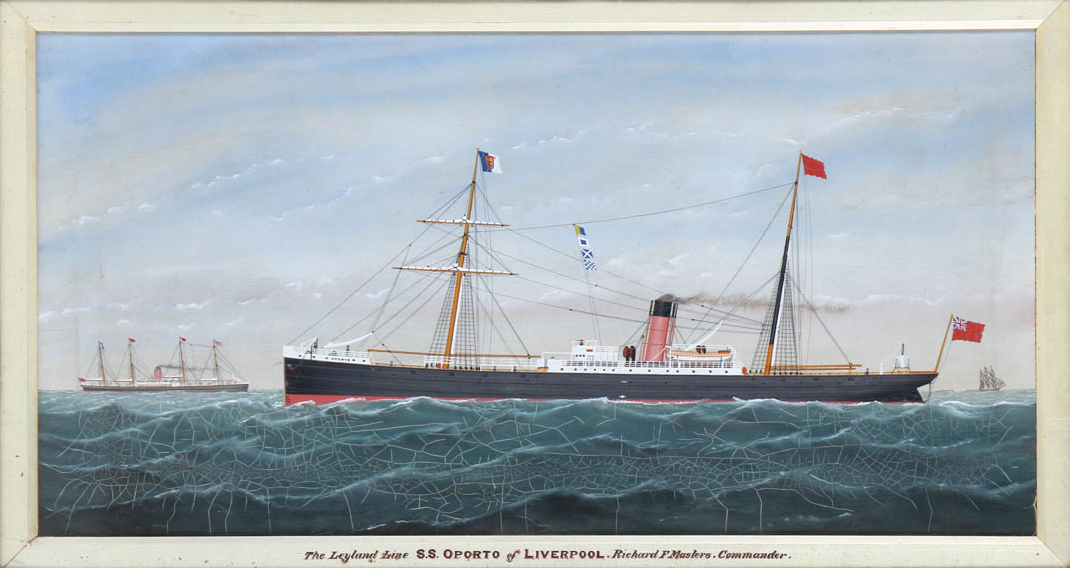
Painting of the Leyland steamship Oporto

With the death of Frederick Leyland in 1892, John Ellermann, Christopher Furness and Henry Withy took over the Leyland Line. Ellermann became managing director of the company and, in 1893, also took over the chairmanship of Frederick Leyland & Co. In 1896, Leyland set up a passenger service in cooperation with Furness Withy, from Liverpool to New York and the Canadian ports. In 1896, the Wilson Line was added and the joint service was called Wilson, Furness & Leyland Line. The cooperation was limited exclusively to this service. In 1899 Leyland took over the shipping company West India & Pacific Steamship Co. Ltd. and thus opened a liner service to the West Indies (Caribbean)

=== Decline and fate ===
In 1902, the company was bought by the American banker J.P. Morgan and in 1904 the company was under the control of the International Mercantile Marine Company. Leyland line was given responsibility for the European part of the International Navigation Company but had to discontinue the Mediterranean service. Twenty non-emigration Leyland ships were not included in the sale. Later, John Ellerman acquired the London Papayanni Company to form the shipping company Ellerman Lines emerged shortly afterward, in the same year, a rationalization of services followed and Leyland withdrew their ships from service and transferred to John Ellerman's new company. In 1915 with the bankruptcy of the IMMC, the company looked into an uncertain future for the first time. The First World War, which had meanwhile broken out, also meant numerous ship losses for the shipping company. By the First World War and the 1920s, many ships of the Leyland Line transferred to other companies. With The Great Depression, many more ships were sold to other companies or scrapped and, in 1935, Leyland Line's last ship was sold and the company ceased in the same year.

== Ships of the Leyland Line ==
List of Leyland Line ships with dates of entry to service for the company
| Name | Shipyard | GRT | Launch date | Notes | Image |
|---|---|---|---|---|---|
| Belgian | ? | 1,989 | 1855 | Little is known about her or her career with the line. | |
| Egyptian | Harland & Wolff | 2,137 | 1861 | Broken up in 1902. | |
| Persian | Harland & Wolff | 2,137 | 1863 | Broken up in 1902. | |
| Arabian | Harland & Wolff | 2,137 | 1866 | Broken up in 1902. | |
| Iberian | Harland & Wolff | 2,931 | 1867 | Sunk at Cape Clear, 1885 | |
| Illyrian | Harland & Wolff | 2,931 | 1867 | Wrecked on Cape Clear, 1884 | |
| Istrian | Harland & Wolff | 2,931 | 1867 | Sold to Furness Withy, 1894 | |
| Bavarian | Harland & Wolff | 3,113 | 1869 | Sold to J. Glynn & Son, Liverpool, 1892 | |
| Bohemian | Harland & Wolff | 3,113 | 1870 | Sunk off Ireland, 1891 | |
| Bulgarian | Harland & Wolff | 3,113 | 1870 | Sunk off Ireland, 1885 | |
| Woolton | Oswald, Mordaunt & Co | 2,152 | 2 May 1885 | Sailed from Newcastle, New South Wales on 14 June 1893 for Valparaíso, Chile, with a cargo of coal and tallow, and disappeared on the voyage. | |
| Anglian | Alexander Stephen and Sons | 5,532 | 2 May 1885 | Sunk by torpedo in the English Channel, 1915. | |
| Bostonian | Harland & Wolff | 4,472 | 1888 | Scrapped in 1913. | |
| Georgian | Harland & Wolff | 5,088 | 1890 | Sunk by UB-47 in 1917. | |
| Louisianian | Barclay Curle | 3,643 | 1891 | Broken up in 1924. | |
| Cornishman | Harland & Wolff | 5,749 | 1891 | Scrapped in 1926. | |
| Welshman | Harland & Wolff | 5,749 | 1891 | Scrapped in 1929. | |
| Colonian | Harland & Wolff | 6,583 | 1891 | Scrapped in 1926. | |
| Victorian | Harland & Wolff | 2,152 | 1895 | Sunk by torpedo off Malta, 1916. | |
| Armenian | Harland & Wolff | 8,825 | 25 July 1895 | Sunk by torpedo by U-24 on 28 June 1915. | |
| American | Harland & Wolff | 8,249 | 8 August 1895 | Scrapped at Genoa in 1932. | |
| Cestrian | Harland & Wolff | 8,823 | 1896 | Sunk by torpedo in the Aegean Sea, 1917. | |
| Londonian | Alexander Stephen and Sons | 8,823 | 1896 | Capsized and sank, 1898. | |
| European | Harland & Wolff | 8,249 | 9 July 1896 | Scrapped at Genoa in 1933. | |
| Asian | Caird & Company | 5,613 | 4 August 1898 | Ran aground and broke up. | |
| Antillian | Caird & Company | 5,613 | 20 September 1898 | Scrapped in 1930. | |
| Winifredian | Harland & Wolff | 10,435 | 1899 | Broken up in Italy, 1929. | |
| Atlantian | Armstrong Whitworth | 9,355 | 1899 | Sunk by torpedo off Eagle's Rock, 1918. | |
| Devonian | Harland & Wolff | 10,405 | 1900 | Sunk by torpedo in 1917. | |
| Bohemian | Alexander Stephen and Sons | 8,548 | 28 June 1900 | Ran aground in 1920. | |
| Iberian | Sir James Laing & Sons | 5,223 | 1900 | Sunk by torpedo in 1915. | |
| Canadian | R & W Hawthorn, Leslie & Co Ltd | 9,301 | 1900 | Sunk by torpedo in 1917. | |
| Californian | Caledon Shipbuilding & Engineering Company | 6,223 | 26 November 1901 | Best known for not coming to the aid of RMS Titanic despite being the closest ship in the area. Sunk by German U-boat, 9 November 1915. | |
| Hanoverian | R & W Hawthorn | 13,507 | 25 February 1902 | First sold to the Dominion Line, then sold to the White Star Line, before returning to the Leyland Line as Devonian and being chartered to Red Star Line. Scrapped in 1929. | |
| Scotian | Harland & Wolff | 18,084 | 8 October 1903 | Sold in 1907 to Hamburg America Line; renamed President Lincoln; sunk 31 May 1918. | |
| Servian | Harland & Wolff | 18,072 | 19 February 1903 | Sold in 1907 to Hamburg America Line; renamed President Grant. Was troop transport in First and Second World Wars. Sold for scrap on 11 March 1952. | ≥frameless |
| Ninian | R & W Hawthorn, Leslie & Co Ltd | 6,385 | February 1912 | Scrapped in 1934. | |
| Norwegian | Caledon Shipbuilding & Engineering Company | 6,327 | 1913 | Torpedoed off Ireland in 1917, beached but total loss. | |
| Regina | Harland & Wolff | 16,314 | 19 April 1917 | Became troop transport during First World War. Scrapped in 1947. | |
| Pennland | Harland & Wolff | 16,322 | 11 November 1920 | Sunk 25 April 1941. | |
| Dakarian | Harland & Wolff | 6,426 | 1921 | Sold in 1933, Scrapped in 1958. | |
| Dakotian | Harland & Wolff | 6,426 | 1922 | Sold in 1934, Sunk by mine in 1940. | |
| Darian | Harland & Wolff | 6,434 | 1922 | Sold in 1934, Sunk by in 1941. | |
| Daytonian | Harland & Wolff | 6,434 | 1922 | Sold in 1934, Sunk in 1942. | |
