= Ammunition train =

Military transport

The ammunition train was an element of armies in 19th and 20th century warfare. They were responsible for transporting the artillery and infantry ammunition of each division from the ammunition refilling point to the area of engagement. The train itself may have been a literal train, but in most cases was not, the 'train' being the military term. Depending on the era, its conveyance would be horse-drawn wagon or motor vehicles, and it was assigned the necessary personnel and equipment to fulfill these roles.

Their traditional capacity has been largely superseded in modern combat. In the first 200 years of existence of the United States Military, each combat division was supposed to have an ammunition train assigned to its field artillery brigade, though this was not always the case.
