= SS Russian =

British steamship sunk in 1915

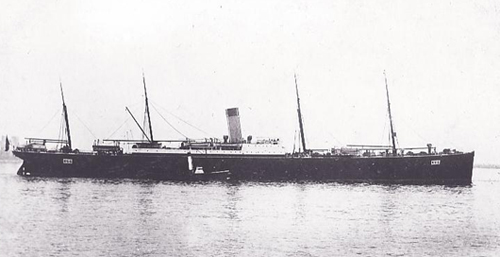

History

United Kingdom
- Name: 1895: Victorian; 1914: Russian
- Owner: F Leyland & Co
- Operator: 1903: White Star Line
- Port of registry: Liverpool
- Route: 1895: Liverpool – Boston; 1903: Liverpool – New York; 1909: Liverpool – Gulf of Mexico
- Builder: Harland & Wolff, Belfast
- Yard number: 291
- Launched: 6 July 1895
- Completed: 31 August 1895
- Maiden voyage: 7 September 1895
- Identification: UK official number 105334; code letters PBGC; by 1914: call sign MYY
- Fate: Sunk by torpedo, 14 December 1916

General characteristics
- Type: cargo liner
- Tonnage: 8,825 GRT, 5,753 NRT, 10,500 DWT
- Length: 512.5 ft (156.2 m)
- Beam: 59.2 ft (18.0 m)
- Depth: 35.0 ft (10.7 m)
- Decks: 3
- Installed power: 718 NHP
- Propulsion: 1 × triple-expansion engine; 1 × screw
- Sail plan: four-masted schooner
- Notes: sister ships: Armenian, Cestrian

SS Russian was a British cargo liner that was launched in Ireland in 1895 as Victorian. In her first few years she carried cattle from Boston to Liverpool. From 1903 she carried cattle from New York to Liverpool. From 1908 she traded between the Gulf Coast of the United States and Liverpool. Leyland Line owned her throughout her career, but White Star Line managed her from 1903. She was renamed Russian in 1914.

In the Second Boer War she took troops and horses to and from South Africa. In the First World War she took mules from Virginia to Egypt. A U-boat sank her in the Mediterranean in 1916.

== Building and registration ==
In 1895 Harland & Wolff in Belfast launched three cargo liners for Frederick Leyland & Co. Yard number 291 was launched on 6 July as Victorian, and completed on 31 August. Yard number 292 was launched on 25 July as Armenian, and completed on 19 September. Yard number 296 was launched on 21 September as Cestrian, and completed on 5 March 1896.

Victorian's registered length was 512.5 ft (156.2 m), her beam was 59.2 ft (18.0 m), and her depth was 35.0 ft (10.7 m). She was designed primarily to carry cattle, but she also had "about a dozen staterooms" for passengers. Her tonnages were 8,765 GRT, 5,714 NRT, and 10,500 DWT. When new, Victorian, Armenian, and Cestrian were noted for being of "exceptionally large tonnage" among newly-built ships, second only to White Star Line's Georgic. Victorian had a single screw, driven by a three-cylinder triple-expansion engine that was rated at 718 NHP. She also had four masts, and could be rigged as a schooner.

Leyland registered Victorian at Liverpool. Her United Kingdom official number was 105334 and her code letters were PBGC.

== Maiden voyage ==
On 7 September 1895 she left Liverpool on her maiden voyage, and on 17 September she arrived in Boston. In October she left for Liverpool carrying "the heaviest cargo ever taken out of Boston harbor". It included 155,000 bushels of grain, 5,300 bales of cotton, and 1,800 tons of flour, as well as 654 head of cattle and 1,591 head of sheep.

== Boer War ==
From 23 November 1899 Victorian was Transport number 66 in the Second Boer War. On 15 February 1900 she left Tilbury Docks with the 17th Lancers, a draft of the 2nd Lancashire Fusiliers and 470 horses, for Cape Town. On 3 December 1900 she left South Africa carrying 199 prisoners of war (PoWs) to Saint Helena, where she arrived on 11 December.

It was reported that on 16 January 1902 Victorian arrived in Halifax, Nova Scotia via Cape Verde to embark a detachment of the Canadian Mounted Rifles to take to South Africa, and that she was to leave about a week later. However, it is also recorded that in January 1902 she left South Africa carrying 77 PoWs to St Helena, where she arrived on 10 February. On 9 July 1902 she left South Africa carrying 27 officers, 650 men, and 506 horses to Southampton. The Admiralty returned her to her owners on 1 August 1902, after 534 days of service.

== White Star Line ==
In December 1902 Victorian made her first voyage to New York. She arrived off New York Harbor on 28 December; left on 3 January 1903; and got back to Liverpool on 14 January. From May 1903 White Star Line managed Victorian and her sister ship Armenian. The pair were transferred to White Star's route between Liverpool and New York. Sailings left New York for Liverpool on alternate Tuesdays.

SS Russian

In June 1908 White Star Line withdrew its New York cargo and livestock service from New York, in response to transcontinental railroads setting freight rates that disadvantaged that port. On 2 May 1910 Victorian arrived in Pensacola, Florida, to load part of a cargo for Liverpool. She was to continue to New Orleans or Galveston to load the remainder. At the time, she was reported to be also trading with Cuba. In January 1911 Victorian sailed from Liverpool via the Azores to Chalmette, Louisiana. She left Liverpool on 4 January and reached Chalmette on 19 January, which at that time was a record-breaking passage between the two ports. In January 1912 Victorian left Galveston with cargo worth $1,277,325. It included 23,804 bales of cotton, plus quantities of spelter, cottonseed cake, cottonseed, and staves. The staves were destined for Leith in Scotland.

By 1912 Victorian was equipped with wireless telegraphy, supplied and operated by the Marconi Company. By 1914 her wireless call sign was MYY.

== First World War ==
In August 1914 Victorian was renamed Russian, presumably to avoid confusion with Allan Line's RMS Victorian.

On 16 November 1916 Russian left Newport News, Virginia for Alexandria in Egypt. She carried livestock, plus US stockmen to look after them. That December she left Salonica (now Thessaloniki) in Greece in ballast. On 14 December 1916 UB-43 torpedoed her 210 nautical miles (390 km) east of Malta, sinking her at position 35°20′N 18°52′E.

The sinking killed a total of 28 people, including her Chief Officer and Second Officer. 91 or 92 Americans were aboard when Russian was sunk, including 68 white cattlemen or hostlers, 22 African Americans, and a veterinary surgeon. 17 Americans were killed in the sinking, including 15 of the African Americans.

== Bibliography ==
- Haws, Duncan (1979). The Ships of the Cunard, American, Red Star, Inman, Leyland, Dominion, Atlantic Transport and White Star lines. Merchant Fleets in Profile. Vol. 2. Cambridge: Patrick Stephens Ltd. ISBN 0-85059-324-7.
- Lloyd's Register of British and Foreign Shipping. Vol. I.–Steamers. London: Lloyd's Register of Shipping. 1896 – via Internet Archive.
- Lloyd's Register of British and Foreign Shipping. Vol. II.–Steamers. London: Lloyd's Register of Shipping. 1912 – via Internet Archive.
- The Marconi Press Agency Ltd (1914). The Year Book of Wireless Telegraphy and Telephony. London: The Marconi Press Agency Ltd.
- Mercantile Navy List. London. 1896 – via Crew List Index Project.
- Report on Demobilization of the S. African Field Force. Pretoria. 1903 – via AngloBoerWar.com.
