= William Keller (Medal of Honor) =

U.S. Army Medal of Honor recipient (1876–1963)

William G. Keller
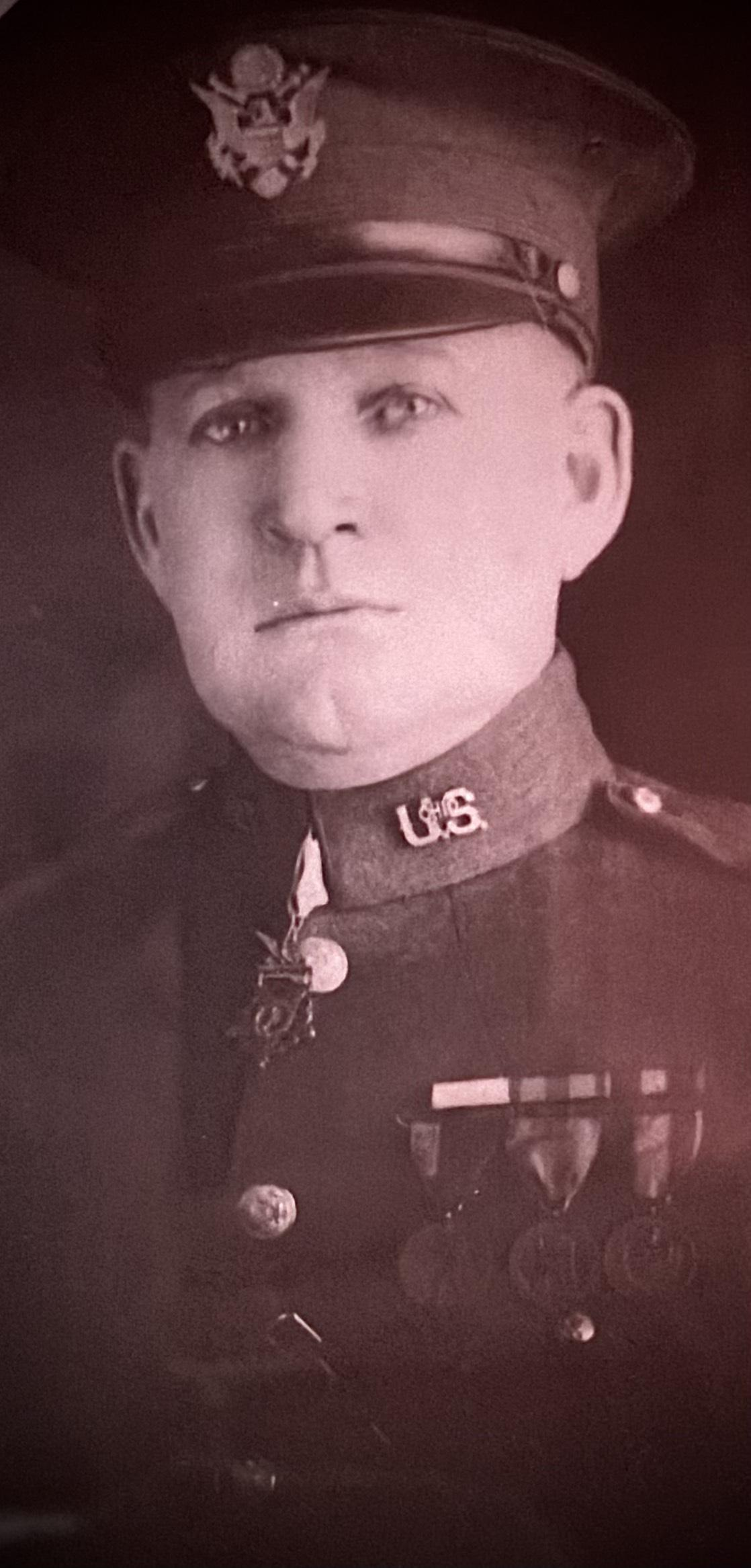
- William Keller wearing the Medal of Honor
- Born: April 19, 1876; Buffalo, New York, US
- Died: September 20, 1963 (aged 87)
- Military career
- Allegiance: United States
- Branch: United States Army
- Rank: Private
- Units: Company F, 10th U.S. Infantry
- Conflicts: Spanish–American War; Battle of San Juan Hill; Siege of Santiago
- Awards: Medal of Honor

William G. Keller (April 19, 1876 – September 20, 1963) was a United States Army soldier who received the Medal of Honor, the United States' highest military decoration for valor, for his actions during the Spanish–American War. As a private in Company F of the 10th U.S. Infantry, Keller distinguished himself on July 1, 1898, during the advance on Santiago de Cuba. He assisted in the rescue of wounded soldiers from in front of the lines while under heavy enemy fire at San Juan Hill, carrying them a mile to safety. Keller was officially awarded the Medal of Honor on June 22, 1899.

After his military service, he moved to Cleveland, Ohio, where he worked for the Ohio Bell telephone company and became a prominent local figure. He served in a special guard of honor for President Franklin D. Roosevelt at the 1937 inaugural ceremonies.

Keller died in 1963 and is buried in Lake View Cemetery in Cleveland.

== Biography ==
Keller was born April 19, 1876, in Buffalo, New York and entered the army from same location. He was sent to the Spanish–American War with Company F, 10th U.S. Infantry as a private where he received the Medal of Honor for assisting in the rescue of wounded while under heavy enemy fire.

After leaving the Army, he moved to Cleveland, where he worked for the Ohio Bell Telephone Company, retiring in 1941. He died September 20, 1963 at his home in Sarasota, Florida, where he had lived since 1943.

== Medal of Honor citation ==
Rank and organization: Private, Company F, 10th U.S. Infantry. Place and date: At Santiago de Cuba, 1 July 1898. Entered service at: Buffalo, N.Y. Birth: Buffalo, N.Y. Date of issue: 22 June 1899.

Citation:

Gallantly assisted in the rescue of the wounded from in front of the lines and under heavy fire of the enemy.

== See also ==
- List of Medal of Honor recipients for the Spanish–American War
