= James J. Nash =

United States Army Medal of Honor recipient (1875–1927)

- Born: 1875; Louisville, Kentucky, US
- Died: June 11, 1927 (aged 51–52)
- Military career
- Allegiance: United States
- Branch: United States Army
- Rank: First Sergeant
- Units: Company F, 10th U.S. Infantry
- Conflicts: Spanish–American War
- Awards: Medal of Honor

James J. Nash (1875 – June 11, 1927) was a soldier serving in the United States Army during the Spanish–American War who received the Medal of Honor for bravery.

== Biography ==
Nash was born in 1875 in Louisville, Kentucky, and entered the army from the same location. He was sent to the Spanish–American War with Company F, 10th U.S. Infantry as a private, where he received the Medal of Honor for assisting in the rescue of the wounded while under heavy enemy fire.

He died on June 11, 1927.

== Medal of Honor citation ==
Rank and organization: Private, Company F, 10th U.S. Infantry. Place and date: At Santiago, Cuba, 1 July 1898. Entered service at: Louisville, Ky. Birth: Louisville, Ky. Date of issue: 22 June 1899.

=== Citation ===
Gallantly assisted in the rescue of the wounded from in front of the lines and under heavy fire from the enemy.

== See also ==
- List of Medal of Honor recipients for the Spanish–American War
