= SS Amerika (1905) =

Ocean liner and troopship (1905–1957)

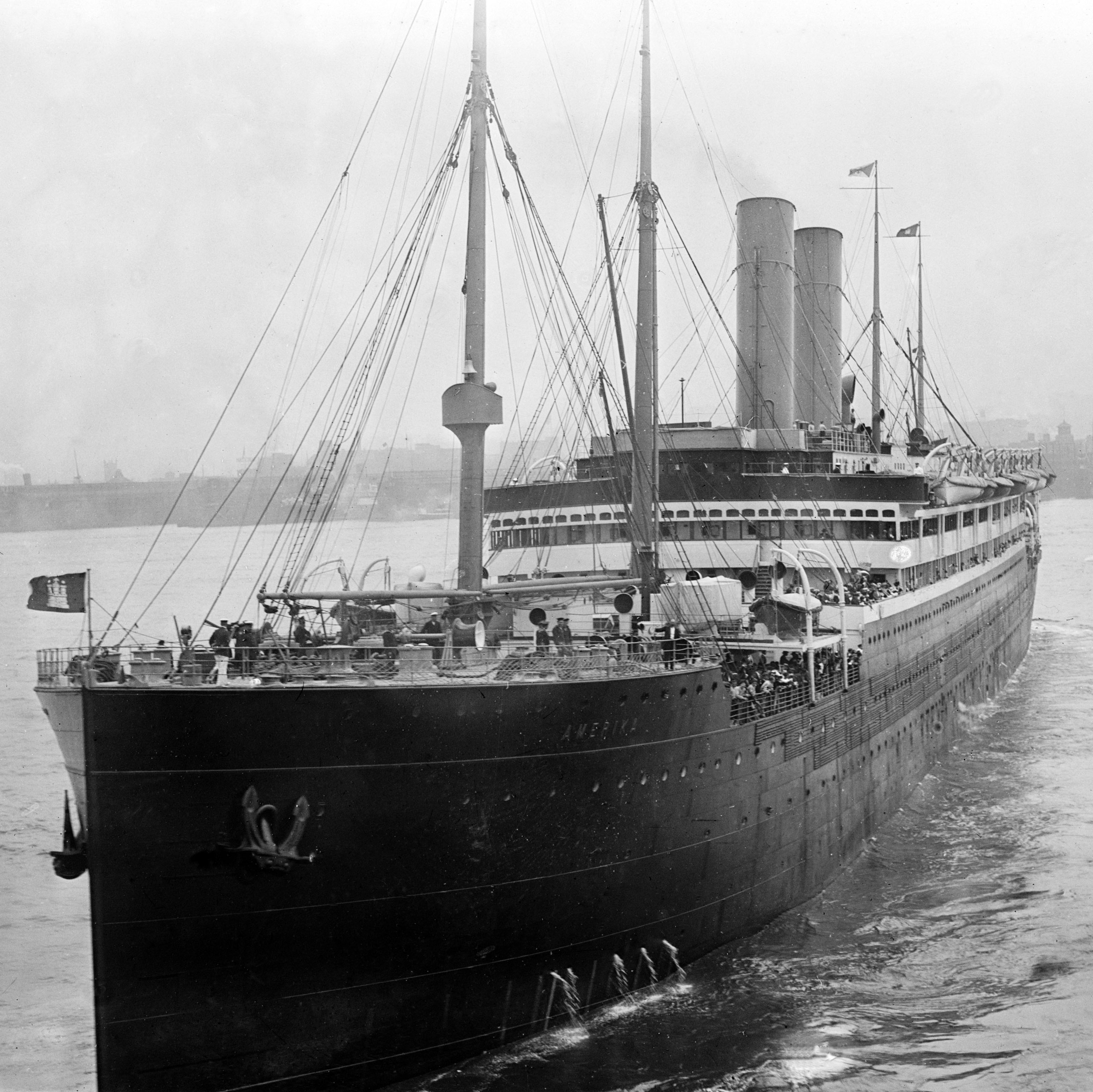
- As Amerika, before the First World War

History

Germany
- Name: Amerika
- Namesake: German spelling of America
- Owner: Hamburg America Line
- Builder: Harland & Wolff, Belfast
- Yard number: 357
- Launched: 20 April 1905
- Completed: 21 September 1905
- In service: 11 October 1905
- Out of service: 1 August 1914
- Fate: Seized by United States, April 1917

History

United States
- Name: USS America (ID-3006)
- Owner: United States Navy
- Acquired: 25 July 1917
- Commissioned: 6 August 1917
- Decommissioned: 26 September 1919
- Fate: Transferred to War Department, 26 September 1919

History

United States
- Name: USAT America
- Operator: United States Army
- Acquired: 26 September 1919
- In service: 26 September 1919
- Out of service: 1920
- Fate: Transferred to the USSB

History

United States Lines
- Name: SS America
- Owner: USSB
- Operator: United States Mail Steamship; United States Lines
- In service: 1920
- Out of service: 1931
- Fate: Transferred to the War Department

History

United States
- Name: USAT Edmund B. Alexander
- Namesake: Edmund Brooke Alexander
- Owner: United States Army
- Acquired: October 1940
- In service: January 1941
- Out of service: 26 May 1949
- Refit: May 1942
- Fate: Scrapped 16 January 1957

General characteristics
- Tonnage: 22,622 GRT, 13,637 NRT
- Length: 669 ft (204 m)
- Beam: 74.3 ft (22.6 m)
- Propulsion: 2 steam engines, twin screw propellers
- Speed: 18 knots (33 km/h; 21 mph)
- Capacity: 2,508 passengers as follows: 386 first class; 150 second class; 222 third class; 1,750 fourth class
- Crew: 577

General characteristics Differences as USS America
- Displacement: 41,500 Tons
- Length: 687 ft (209 m)
- Beam: 75 ft 5 in (22.99 m)
- Draft: 39 ft 5.25 in (12.0206 m)
- Speed: 17.5 knots (32 km/h; 20 mph)
- Complement: 994
- Armament: 4 × 6"; 2 × 1-pounders; 2 × .30 caliber Colt machine gun; 1 × .30 caliber Lewis machine gun; 9 × depth charge

SS Amerika was a transatlantic ocean liner and a troop transport for the United States during both world wars. She was launched in 1905 as Amerika by Harland & Wolff in Belfast for the Hamburg America Line of Germany. As a passenger liner, she sailed primarily between Hamburg and New York. At the outset of the war, Amerika was docked at Boston; rather than risk seizure by the British Royal Navy, she remained in port for the next three years.

Hours before the American entry into World War I, Amerika was seized and placed under control of the United States Shipping Board (USSB). Later transferred to the U.S. Navy for use as a troop transport, she was initially commissioned as USS Amerika with Naval Registry Identification Number 3006 (ID-3006), but her name was soon Anglicized to America. As America she transported almost 40,000 troops to France. She sank at her mooring in Hoboken in 1918, but was soon raised and reconditioned. After the Armistice, America transported more than 51,000 troops back home from Europe. In 1919, she was handed over to the War Department for use by the United States Army as USAT America, under whose control she remained until 1920.

Returned to the USSB in 1920, America was initially assigned to the United States Mail Steamship Company, and later, after that company's demise, to United States Lines, for which she plied the North Atlantic on Bremen to New York routes. In March 1926, due to an oil leak from inside the ship, near the end of one of her periodic refits, America suffered a fire that raged for seven hours and burned nearly all of her passenger cabins. Despite almost $2,000,000 in damage, the ship was rebuilt and back in service by the following year. In April 1931, America ended her service for the United States Lines and was laid up for almost nine years.

In October 1940, America was reactivated for the U.S. Army and renamed USAT Edmund B. Alexander. After establishing the Newfoundland Base Command and a stint as a barracks ship at St. John's, Newfoundland in January–May 1941, Edmund B. Alexander was refitted for use as a troopship for World War II duty. She was first placed on a New Orleans to Panama route, but later transferred to trooping between New York and European ports. At the end of the war, Edmund B. Alexander was converted to carry military dependents, remaining in that service until 1949. She was placed in reserve until sold for scrapping in January 1957.

== Amerika ==
Amerika, under construction at Harland & Wolff, Belfast in April 1905.

Amerika was a steel-hulled, 22,622 gross register tons, twin-screw, steam passenger liner. She was launched on 20 April 1905 at Belfast, by the shipbuilding firm Harland & Wolff. Built for the Hamburg America Line, the steamer entered transatlantic service in the autumn of 1905, when she left Hamburg on 11 October, bound for New York City. The night before her inaugural voyage on 19 June 1905, Kaiser Wilhelm II boarded the ship and dined on a menu created by Auguste Escoffier, the French chef who was in charge of organizing the restaurant on board Amerika.

A slightly larger sister ship, Kaiserin Auguste Victoria was being built at the same time at Hamburg and would remain the largest ship in the world until the Lusitania. Easily one of the most luxurious passenger vessels to sail the seas, Amerika entered upper New York Bay on 20 October, reaching the Hamburg America piers at Hoboken, New Jersey, in mid-afternoon. Some 2,000 people turned out to watch her as she was moored near her consorts at the Hamburg America Line which were bedecked in colorful bunting in nearby slips.

From 1905 to 1914, Amerika plied the North Atlantic trade routes touching at Cherbourg, France, while steaming between Hamburg and New York. Toward the end of that period, her itinerary was altered so that the ship also called at Boulogne, France, and Southampton, England.

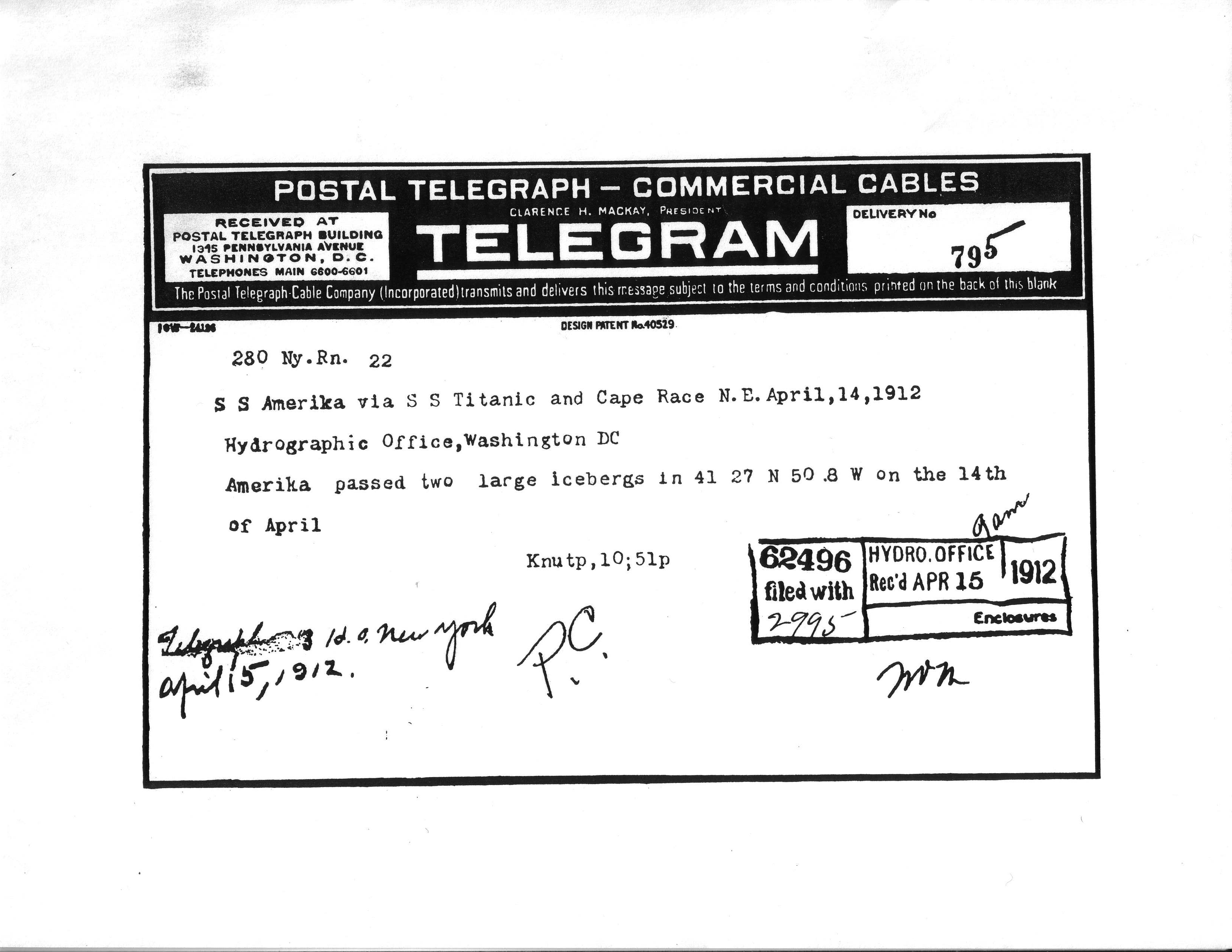
Telegram from Amerika via RMS Titanic on location of two large icebergs, 14 April 1912

On 14 April 1912, a telegram message to the Hydrographic Office in Washington, D.C. reporting that the ship "passed two large icebergs in 41 27N 50 8W on the 14th of April" signed "Knutp, 10;51p[m]". This message was, coincidentally, relayed by the Marconi operator on Titanic to the station at Cape Race because the transmitter of Amerika was not in range of Cape Race at the time. (Note: George E. Turnbull, Deputy-Manager of the Marconi International Marine Communication Company which employed wireless operators for British merchant ships, later testified that this message would be considered and treated as a private message rather than as an official navigational message, and it was up to the operator's own judgement as to whether or not to forward a message like this to the bridge.)

Amerika was responsible for the accidental loss of British submarine B2 by collision 4 nautical miles (7.4 km) northeast of Dover in the early hours of 4 October 1912.

The eruption of fighting at the outset of World War I caught Amerika at Boston, where she was preparing to sail for home. Although due to leave port on 1 August 1914, Amerika stayed at Boston to avoid capture by the Royal Navy. She remained there through almost three years of United States neutrality.

On her voyage from New York to Europe in the second week of April 1911, Amerika carried the mortally ill composer Gustav Mahler back home. He died in Vienna on 18 May 1911.

=== Interiors ===
Lavishly decorated throughout, Amerika had several unique shipboard features, including an electric passenger elevator (the first to be installed on a passenger liner), and an à la carte restaurant which, from early morning to midnight, offered a variety of dishes. It was managed by the hotelier César Ritz, while the chef Auguste Escoffier was responsible for creating the menu, organizing and staffing the kitchen and restaurant.

French architect Charles Mewès was responsible for designing the interiors of Amerika, while the English firm of Waring & Gillow was contracted to decorate the main public rooms. The Illustrated London News stated simply that "the rooms which they [Waring & Gillow] have decorated are artistic triumphs." The Sphere wrote of the interiors that "the whole of the vessel is planned on such a scale that the various rooms do not any longer partake of the nature of ship's cabins but are rather a series of sumptuously-furnished and comfortably-contrived apartments such as one would find in a costly house on shore." Amerika's interiors were a departure from the prevailing style on ocean liners up to that point, as they were modelled after a luxury hotel rather than on castles and palaces.

The grand staircase in First-Class was designed in the Adam style, as was the ladies' drawing room. The drawing room had white walls inset with blue Wedgwood plaques. It was topped by a glass dome, with furniture upholstered in rose-colored silk and draperies in rose and silver. Adjoining the drawing room was a writing room in the Empire style, with paneling of white and gold and heliotrope-colored silk panels. There was also an Elizabethan style smoking room, which occupied two floors connected by a staircase. The room was paneled in oak "of the roughly-fashioned style of the sixteenth century" and along the walls of the upper-level was a carved frieze illustrating scenes from the life of Saint Hubert. The chimneypiece of the smoking room was made of brick, with a stone hearth. The room was lit by lanterns hung from the oak beams which crossed the ceiling.

The First-Class dining saloon was at the bottom of the three-deck high grand staircase. The saloon, which was in the Louis XVI style, was as wide as the ship and about 100 ft. in length. It was overlooked by a balcony on four sides. It featured copies of paintings by François Boucher at either end, with furniture in "gold-colored West Indian satin, veined with green." The à la carte restaurant was modelled on the Ritz-Carlton Grill at the Carlton Hotel in London, which Mewès had designed. The Carlton Hotel Company Board agreed to let the shipping company use the name "Ritz-Carlton Restaurant." It was in the Louis XVI style, with paneling made of chestnut and mahogany, enriched with bronze ormolu accents in vegetative designs. The sideboards were made of matching woods and ormolu, while the chairs were copied from examples at Versailles from the Louis XVI period. At the center of the room was a skylight with gray and yellow-colored panels of glass. Children had their own nursery, which was decorated with painted scenes from nursery rhymes.

In terms of accommodation, the finest suites on board were the two called the "Imperial State Rooms", one decorated in the Adam style, the other in the Empire style. There were also 13 chambres de luxe decorated by Waring & Gillow in a range of historic styles, including Georgian, Queen Anne, Adam, and Sheraton.

== USS America (1917 to 1919) ==
On 6 April 1917, in anticipation that Congress would declare war on Germany, Edmund Billings, the Collector of Customs for the Port of Boston, ordered that Amerika and four other German ships (the Cincinnati, Wittekind, Köln, and Ockenfels) be seized. It remained inactive until it was taken by deputies under the orders of John A. Donald, the Commissioner of the United States Shipping Board (USSB), on 25 July 1917. Upon inspecting the liner, American agents found her filthy and discovered that her crew had sabotaged certain elements of the ship's engineering plant. Nevertheless, with her officers and men detained on Deer Island, Amerika was earmarked by the United States Navy for service in the Cruiser and Transport Force as a troop transport. Given the identification number 3006, she was placed in commission as USS Amerika (ID-3006) at 08:00 on 6 August 1917, at the Boston Navy Yard with Lieutenant Commander Frederick L. Oliver in temporary command. Ten days later, Captain George C. Day arrived on board and assumed command.

Over the ensuing weeks, she was converted into a troopship, and while this work was in progress, Secretary of the Navy Josephus Daniels promulgated General Order No. 320, changing the names of several ex-German ships on 1 September 1917. As a consequence Amerika was renamed America.

The major part of her conversion and repair work having been completed by late September, America ran a six-hour trial outside Boston Harbor on the morning of 29 September. The ship managed to make three more revolutions than she had ever made before. The completion of these trials proved to be a milestone in the reconditioning of the former German ships, for America was the last to be readied for service in the American Navy.

On 18 October 1917, America departed the Boston Navy Yard and, two days later, arrived at Hoboken, New Jersey, which would be the port of embarkation for all of her wartime voyages carrying doughboys to Europe. There, she loaded coal and cargo; received a brief visit from Rear Admiral Albert Gleaves, the commander of the Cruiser-Transport Force; and took on board her first contingent of troops. Completing the embarkation on the afternoon of 29 October, America sailed for France on the morning of 31 October, in company with the transports Mount Vernon, Von Steuben, Agamemnon, the armored cruiser North Carolina, and destroyers Terry and Duncan.

For more than a week, the passage was uneventful. Then, on 7 November, Von Steuben struck Agamemnon while zig-zagging. As America's war history states: "The excitement caused by the collision of these great ships was greatly increased when the Von Steuben sent out a signal that a submarine was sighted." The ships in the convoy dispersed as if on signal, only to draw together in formation once more when the "enemy" failed to materialize. All vessels resumed their stations—all, that is, except Von Steuben whose bow was open to the sea from the damage suffered in the collision. Even the crippled transport rejoined the convoy the following afternoon. Met on 12 November off the coast of France by an escort consisting of converted American yachts and French airplanes and destroyers, the convoy reached safe haven at Brest, America's only wartime port of debarkation. She dropped her anchor at 11:15 and began discharging the soldiers.

Underway again on 29 November, the ship returned to the United States, in convoy, reaching Hoboken on 10 December. She then remained pier side through Christmas and New Year's Day and headed for France again on 4 January 1918, carrying 3,838 troops and 4,100 tons of cargo. The following day, she fell in with the transport Mercury, and armored cruiser Seattle, her escort for the crossing. Except for the after control station personnel reporting a torpedo track crossing in the ship's wake on 17 January—shortly before the transport reached Brest—this voyage was uneventful.

America arrived at Hampton Roads, Virginia, on 6 February and the next day entered the Norfolk Navy Yard for repairs and alterations. At this time, the ship received an additional pair of 6-inch (150 mm) guns to augment her main battery.

Troop ship duty continued:

- Departed Hoboken 27 February 1918 with 3,877 troops, accompanied by Agamemnon and Mount Vernon, arrived at Brest on 10 March.
- Departed Brest 17 March 1918 with French naval personnel (4 officers, 10 petty officers, 77 men), arrived 10 days later.
- Departed Hoboken 6 April with 3,877 troops, joined Great Northern on the 8th and Agamemnon on the 12th, made port 15 April.
- A week later, after disembarking her charges, the transport took on board the survivors from the American munitions ship, Florence H, which had exploded at Quiberon Bay five days before, and sailed for the United States. Entered the Hudson River on 1 May.
- Sailed a week later, joined on 10 May by George Washington, De Kalb, coming from Newport News, Virginia. Shortly after 03:00 on 18 May, four men sighted what appeared to be a periscope some 50 yards from the ship, but it vanished. Arrived in Brest later that day.
- Sailed for the United States on 21 May at 15:50, accompanied by George Washington, De Kalb, and a coastal escort of destroyers. Escort attacked a suspected submarine four hours out then continued. Escort left convoy after 22:00 on 22 May. De Kalb fell behind the next day, and America steamed alone on 25 May. Reached Hoboken four days later.
- Left Hoboken 10 June with 5,305 troops, accompanied by Agamemnon, Mount Vernon, and Orizaba. Joined near Europe by coastal escort eight days later, reached Brest 19 June.
- Left Brest 23 June accompanied by Orizaba, parted company three days later, arrived at Hoboken on 1 July.

In the brief respite that followed, America briefly received Rear Admiral Albert Gleaves on board and was painted in a dazzle camouflage pattern designed to obscure the ship's lines, a pattern that she would wear for the remainder of her days as a wartime transport.

Late on 9 July, America sailed on the seventh of her voyages to Europe for the Navy. Just before midnight on the 14th, while the convoy steamed through a storm that limited visibility severely, a stranger, SS Instructor, unwittingly wandered into the formation and ran afoul of America. In spite of attempts at radical course changes by both ships, America struck the intruder near the break of her poop deck and sheared off her stern which sank almost immediately. America's swing threw the wreck of Instructor clear, allowing it to pass down the transport's port side without touching before it sank less than 10 minutes later. America stopped briefly to search for survivors, but the danger of lurking U-boats limited the pause to the most abbreviated of durations, and the storm added other obstacles. As a result, America succeeded in rescuing only the 11 Instructor crewmen who managed to man a lifeboat. Tragically, the exigencies of war forced America to abandon the other 31 to their fate. A court of inquiry held at Brest on 18 July, soon after America arrived there, exonerated her captain from any blame with regard to the sad incident.

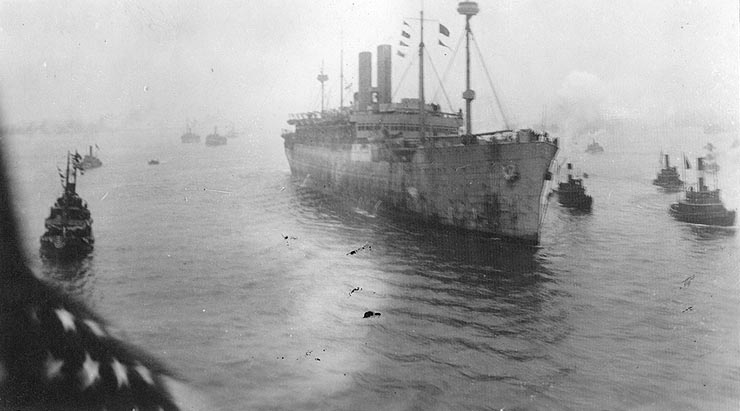
America arrives Boston Harbor, 5 April 1919, with the 26th Army Division aboard

Fortunately, since the brush with Instructor had caused but minor damage to America, the transport was still able to carry out her mission. After embarking passengers for the return trip, she got underway on 25 July in company with Matsonia, Manchuria, Aeolus, Sierra, Martha Washington, Powhatan, and SS Patria. Upon parting from these ships three days later, America raced on alone and reached Hoboken on the evening of 3 August.

Her eighth voyage began on 18 August with America's sailing in company with George Washington and Von Steuben. She reached Brest on the 27th, discharged her troops, and embarked the usual mix of passengers. On this trip, she took on board 171 army officers, 165 army enlisted men, 18 French nuns, 10 YMCA secretaries, a Red Cross official and two nurses, two civilians and two sailors before sailing on 30 August. One of the civilians was the distinguished conductor Walter Damrosch who, at the request of General John J. Pershing, commanding general of the American Expeditionary Force (AEF), was entrusted the mission of reorganizing the bands of the Army, and had founded a school for bandmasters at the general headquarters of the AEF at Chaumont, France.

America parted from George Washington and Von Steuben on 2 September and reached the Boston Navy Yard on the 7th. Following drydocking, voyage repairs, and the embarkation of another contingent of troops, she arrived at Hoboken on the morning of the 17th. Three days later, she cleared the port, in company with Agamemnon, bound for France on her ninth transatlantic voyage cycle.

=== Influenza epidemic ===
By this time, the Spanish flu epidemic was raging in the United States and Europe and had taken many lives. From its first appearance, special precautions had been taken on board America to protect both her ship's company and passengers. The sanitary measures had succeeded in keeping all in the ship healthy. However, this group of soldiers—who had come on board at Boston where the epidemic had been raging—brought the flu with them. As a result, 997 cases of flu and pneumonia occurred among the embarked soldiers on the passage to France, while fifty six cases broke out among the 940 men in the crew. Before the transport completed the round-trip voyage and arrived back at Hoboken, New Jersey, fifty three soldiers and two sailors had died on board. This comparatively low death rate (some ships lost considerably more men) can be attributed to the efforts of the ship's doctors and corpsmen, as well as the embarked units' medical personnel. Forty-two of the fifty three deaths among the troops occurred in the time the ship lay at anchor at Brest from 29 September to 2 October.

The day after reaching home, America commenced coaling and loading stores in preparation for her 10th voyage and completed the task at 02:25 on 15 October. In addition, the ship was thoroughly fumigated to rid her of influenza germs. By that time, all troops had been embarked and the ship loaded, ready to sail for France soon thereafter.

=== Sinking and salvage ===
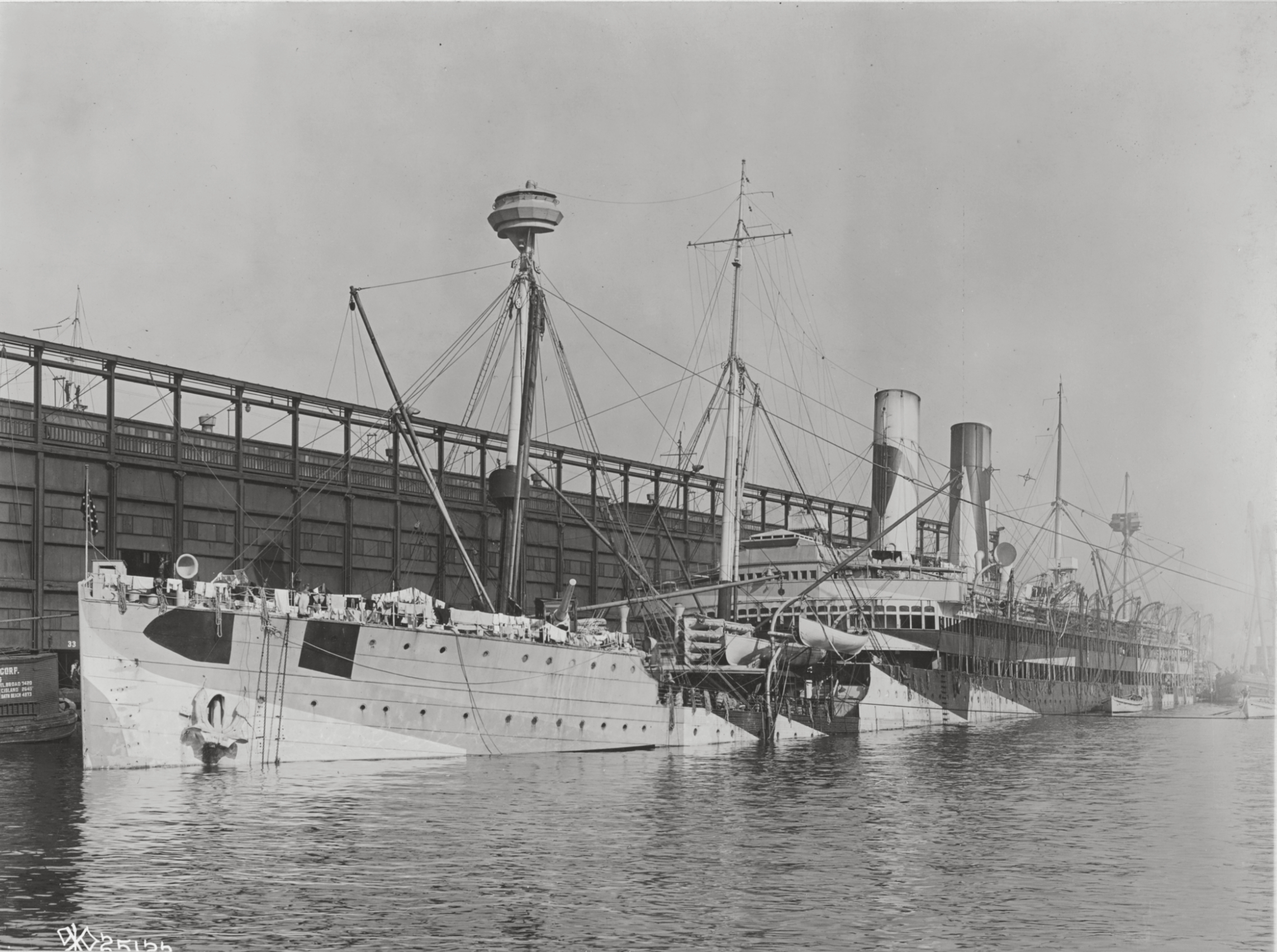
USS America sunk at her mooring, seen from her port side

At 04:45, America, without warning, began listing to port and kept heeling over as water entered through the coaling ports which were still open although the coaling process had been completed over two hours before. Soon after the ship began listing, the general alarm was sounded throughout the ship. In the troop spaces, the urgent sound of that alarm awakened the sleeping soldiers who sought egress from their compartments. Soldiers and sailors both streamed up ladders topside; others jumped for safety on the coal barges, still alongside, or down cargo nets to the dock. Sentries on deck fired their rifles in the air as they sought to warn their comrades on board.

Commander Edward C. S. Baker, the executive officer, in the absence of Captain Zeno E. Briggs whose wife was seriously ill, directed Lieutenant John G. M. Stone, the gunnery officer, to clear the lower compartments. Stone was credited with leading to safety many soldiers and sailors who had been blindly plunging through various compartments (the flooding of the engine rooms had put the lights out aboard the ship) seeking some means of escape.

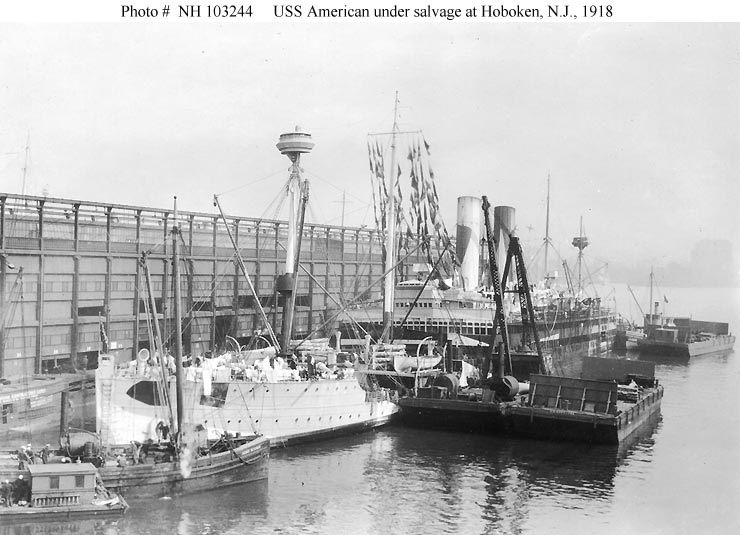
Salvage efforts under way on the USS America

Rear Admiral Gleaves arrived at the dock soon after the ship sank, the water covering her main deck, to see personally what had happened to one of the largest transports in the Cruiser-Transport Force. Before the day was out, a court of inquiry began meeting to determine what had happened. Over the ensuing days, salvage efforts continued, including the removal of guns, cargo, and other equipment, as well as the search for the six men unaccounted for at muster. Eventually, the bodies of all, four soldiers and two sailors, were recovered. Divers worked continuously, closing open ports (almost all on "G" deck had been left open to allow the air to be cleared of the smell of disinfectants that had been used to cleanse and fumigate the compartments). She was raised and refloated on 21 November 1918, 10 days after the armistice was signed ending World War I. On 16 December, America was towed by 10 tugboats to the New York Navy Yard where she remained undergoing the extensive repairs occasioned by her sinking, well into February 1919.

While unable to determine definitely what had caused the sinking, the court of inquiry posited that water had entered the ship through open ports on "G" deck. An unofficial opinion held by some officers in the case maintained that the listing of the ship had been caused by mud suction, that the ship, to some extent, had been resting on the bottom, and that, when the tide rose, one side was released before the other.

=== After the war ===
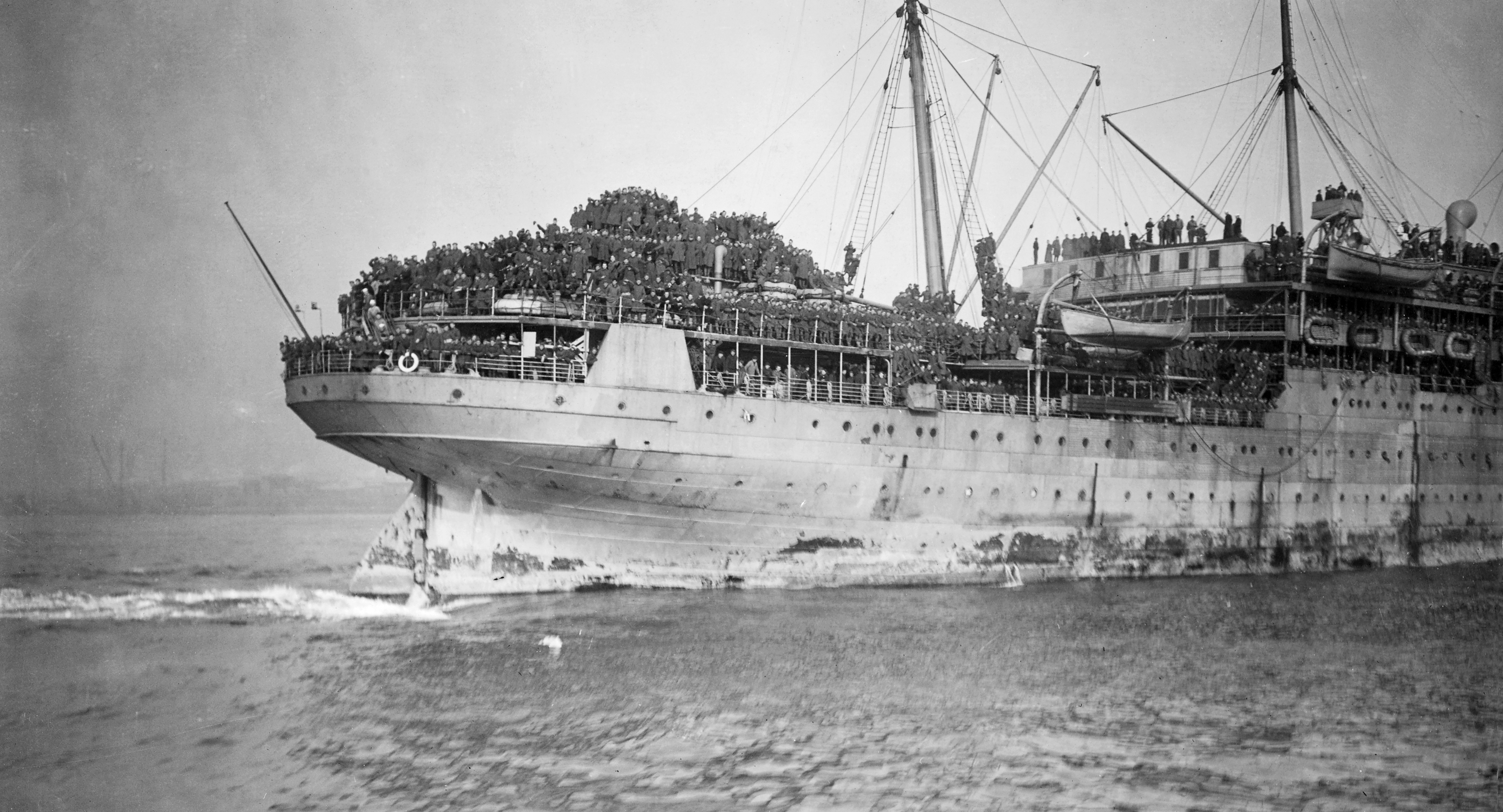
Returning U.S. troops aboard the America as it approaches the Hoboken Port of Embarkation (March 13, 1919)

Foreshadowing the Magic Carpet operations which would follow World War II, a massive effort was made after the armistice to return the veterans of the American Expeditionary Force to the United States. America participated in this effort which commenced on 21 February when the ship sailed for Brest, France, and concluded on 15 September. Between that time, the transport made eight round-trip voyages to Brest. The western terminus was Hoboken, New Jersey for seven voyages and Boston, Massachusetts for the other. Among the 46,823 passengers whom she brought back from France was Benedict Crowell, the Assistant Secretary of War who was embarked in the ship on her last voyage as a Navy transport.

== USAT America (1919 to 1920) ==
On 22 September 1919, shortly after America completed that voyage, the Chief of the Army Transportation Service (ATS), Brigadier General Frank T. Hines, contacted the Navy, expressing the Army's desire to acquire America and Mount Vernon ". . . to transport certain passengers from Europe to the United States." Four days later, America was decommissioned while alongside Pier 2, Hoboken, and transferred to the War Department. Capt. J. Ford, ATS, simultaneously assumed command of the ship.

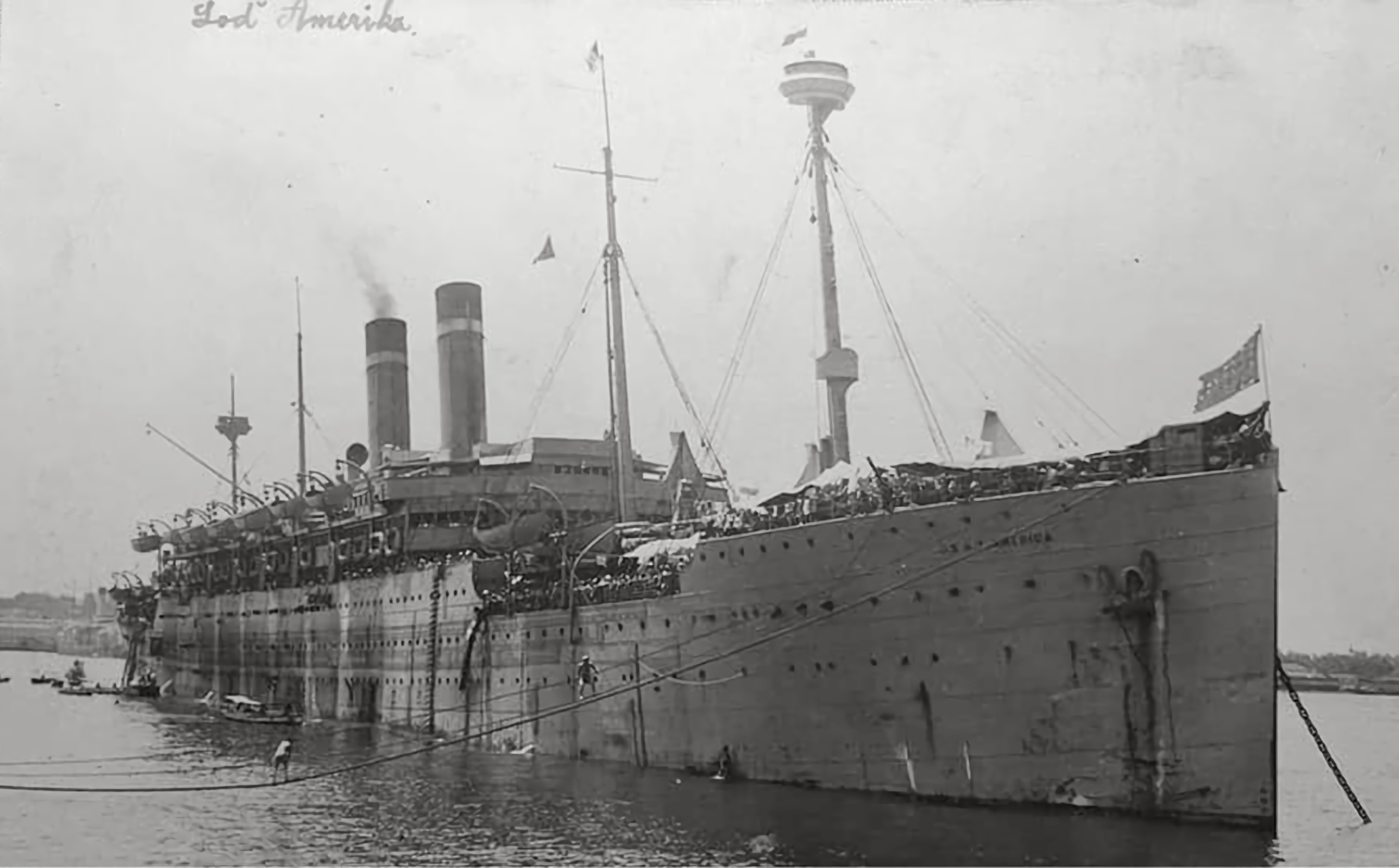
USAT America, c. 1919

USAT America conducted two more voyages between Hoboken and Brest. Trouble highlighted her second voyage under the Army colors. An unruly crew at Brest on 4 December 1919 prompted Capt. Ford to appeal to the colonel commanding Base Section Number Five, at Brest, for an armed guard, fearing mutiny. Apparently, the Army matter was resolved, for the ship reached Hoboken five days before Christmas 1919.

On 20 December, the day America was scheduled to arrive at the port of debarkation, arrangements were made to turn America and two other Army transports, President Grant and George Washington, over to the USSB for operation while they were being carried on the roll of the Army Transport Reserve. However, before the year 1919 was out, events in a faraway land caused a temporary change in this plan.

A glance back at developments on the Eastern Front in World War I may clarify the transport's new mission. When it mobilized for war, Austria-Hungary conscripted countless Czechs. Upon reaching the front, these men, long restive under Austrian rule, deserted in droves and then were organized by Russian officers to fight their former masters. However, the war sapped away the strength of the Russian government more rapidly than it weakened those of the other belligerents and thus encouraged rebellion. One revolution early in 1917 toppled the Czar and a second in the autumn placed a Bolshevik regime in power. The communist leaders quickly negotiated with Germany the treaty of Brest-Litovsk which took Russia out of the war and allowed the Central Powers to concentrate their resources on the Western Front.

This development left the Czech Legion—some 40,000 strong—stranded in Russia with hostile forces separating it from its still oppressed homeland. Allied leaders hoped to use these dedicated and highly disciplined fighting men to bolster their own embattled troops on the western front and encouraged the Czechs to move east on the Trans-Siberian Railroad to Vladivostok where they could be embarked in transports for passage to France.

However, before this could be accomplished, the Czechs, who had tried to remain aloof from Russia's internal struggles, incurred the hostility and opposition of the Bolsheviks and found themselves involuntarily embroiled in the Russian Civil War as something of a rallying point for various counterrevolutionary forces. Moreover, prior to the armistice, some factions within the Allied powers hoped that the Czechs might be used to reopen the fighting on the eastern front against the Central Powers. As a result, some two tempestuous years passed before the entire Czech legion finally assembled at Vladivostok ready for evacuation.

On 30 December 1919, a representative of the War Department contacted the Office of the Chief of Naval Operations stating that Army transports America and President Grant "were to go on a long secret trip as soon as possible." He emphasized the urgency of the situation and requested that the New York Navy Yard give the highest priority to repairing the two transports for sea. The Navy carried out the repairs, including drydocking, at top speed and completed the work by 21 January 1920. Two days later, America shifted to Hoboken and sailed for the Pacific on 30 January.

America reached San Francisco on 16 February and remained there a week before clearing the Golden Gate on 23 February. Sailing via Cavite, in the Philippines (where she tarried from 15 to 23 March), and Nagasaki, Japan, America reached Vladivostok soon thereafter.

While the transport had been on her way to the Russian far eastern port, the situation in Russia had deteriorated markedly. Bolshevik armies had driven the White Russian forces back into Siberia, and the collapse of the White government, headed by Admiral Alexander Kolchak, sounded the death knell of the western attempt to intervene in the civil war. By the time the ship arrived at Vladivostok, the evacuation of the Czech legion was well underway. Adding to the number of people to be transported were the several hundred wives and children of Czech soldiers, since some 1,600 men had married in the period of the "Czech Anabasis" in Russia. By 20 May, the last of the Czech troops had arrived in Vladivostok. Five days later, the United States consul in that port estimated that some 13,200 remained to be repatriated in the five or six remaining transports, which included America. Ultimately, Thomas and America reached Trieste on 8 August, disembarking their contingents of Czechs without incident.

== SS America (1921 to 1931) ==
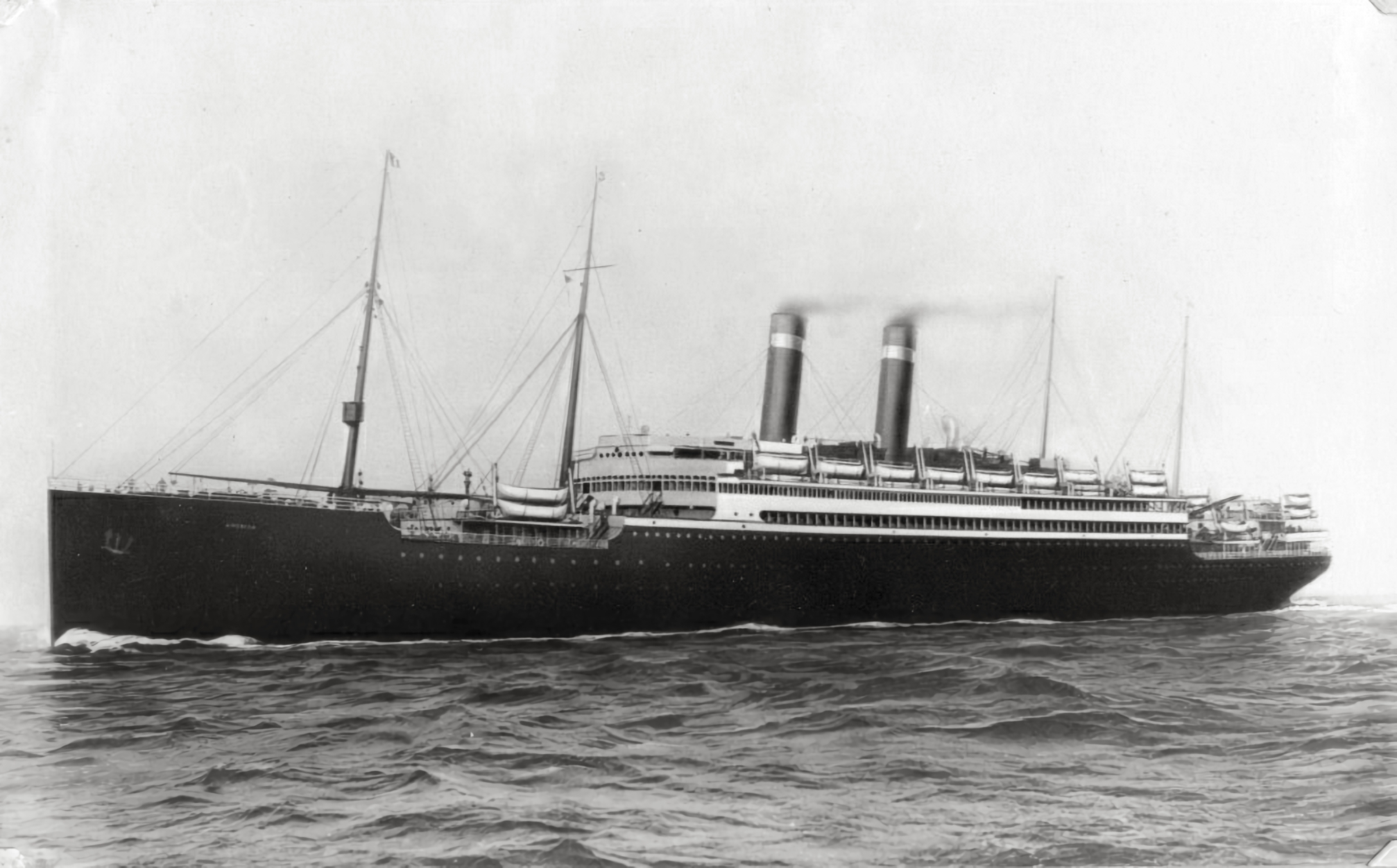
Photo of SS America (c. 1920s)

For America, further service awaited with the United States Lines. Reconditioned to resume her place in the transatlantic passenger trade, she commenced her maiden voyage as an American passenger liner on 22 June 1921, sailing for Bremen, Germany, with stops at Plymouth, England, and Cherbourg, France, en route.

For the next eleven years, America plied the Atlantic, ranking third only in size to the United States Lines' ships Leviathan and George Washington—the latter running mate from the Cruiser-Transport Force days. In June 1924, the America transported the United States Olympic team to Cherbourg, France, for the summer games held in Paris, making the return leg to New York in August. On two occasions, America figured in the headlines.

=== Fire and rescue ===
The first occurred on 10 March 1926, as the ship lay moored in the yard of the Newport News Shipbuilding and Dry Dock Company in Newport News, Virginia awaiting final trials after being reconditioned. A fire broke out on board only a day before she was to be returned to her owner. The fire burned for seven hours and eventually consumed most of the passenger cabins as it swept the ship nearly from stem to stern, causing an estimated $2,000,000 worth of damage, equivalent to $33,027,796.61 in today's money.

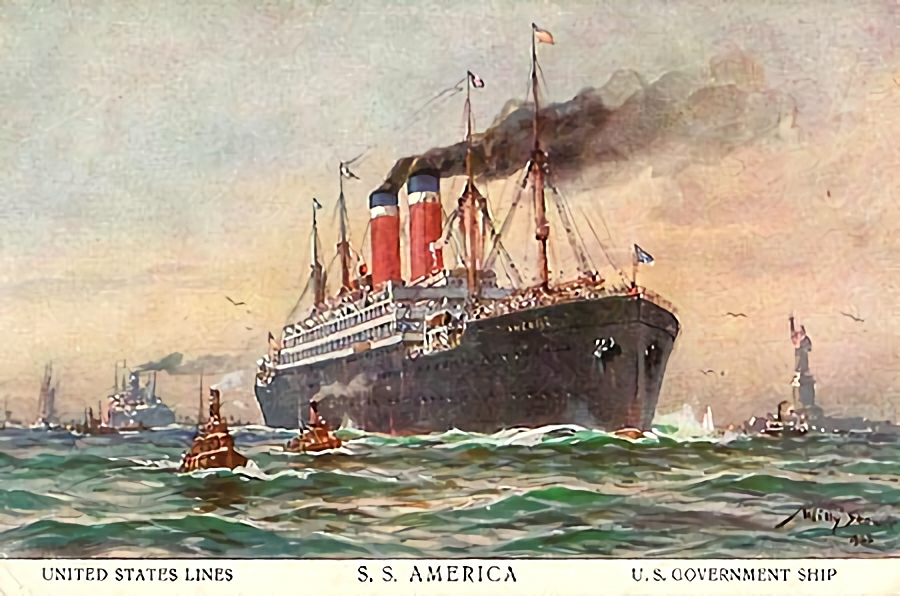
Postcard of America, launched by United States Lines

The second newsworthy incident began on 22 January 1929 when America—then commanded by Captain George Fried—was steaming from France to New York. As she battled her way through a major storm, the liner picked up distress signals from the Italian steamship, Florida. Guided by her radio direction finder, the American ship homed in on the Italian and, late the following afternoon, finally sighted the endangered vessel through light snow squalls. Taking a position off Florida's weather beam, America lowered her number one lifeboat, commanded by her Chief Officer, Harry Manning, with a crew of eight men.

After the boat had been rowed to within 50 feet (15 m) of the listing Florida, Manning had a line thrown across to the eager crew of the distressed freighter One by one, the 32 men from the Italian ship came across the rope. By the time the last of them, the ship's captain, had been dragged on board the pitching lifeboat, the winds had reached gale force, with violent snow and rain squalls, with a high, rough, sea running. Then, via ladders, ropes, cargo nets, and two homemade breeches buoys, sailors on board America brought up Florida's survivors, until all 32 were safe and sound. Finally, they pulled their shipmates from the rescue party back on board. Chief Officer Manning was brought up last. Captain Fried felt that it was highly dangerous to attempt to hoist the number one lifeboat on board and, rather than risk lives, ordered it cut adrift.

=== Inactivated ===
In 1931 and 1932, after two modern ships, Washington and SS Manhattan, had been added to the fleet of the United States Lines, America was laid up at Point Patience, Maryland, on the Patuxent River, along with her consorts of days gone by – George Washington, Agamemnon, and Mount Vernon, all veterans of the old Cruiser-Transport Force. For the next eight years, America were placed in reserve.

== USAT Edmund B. Alexander (1940 to 1949) ==
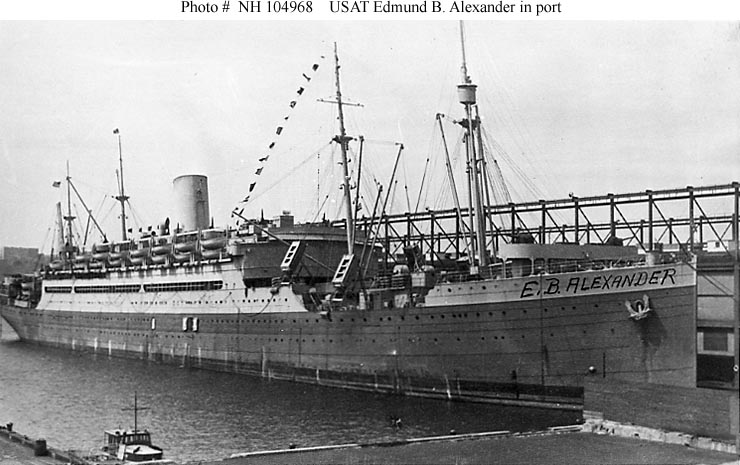
USAT Edmund B. Alexander

When the United States transferred fifty surplus destroyers to the British government in the destroyers for bases agreement in the fall of 1940, two of the acquisitions were bases at Argentia, Newfoundland and the future Fort Pepperrell at St. John's, Newfoundland, but no barracks existed at St. John's for troops, so an interim solution had to be provided.

As a result, in October 1940, America was acquired by the United States Army and towed to Baltimore, Maryland, to undergo rehabilitation in the Bethlehem Steel Company yard. Earmarked for use as a floating barracks, the ship would provide quarters for 1,200 troops – the garrison for the new base at St. John's. Still a coal-burner, the ship could only make a shadow of her former speed – 10 knots (19 km/h).

With the ship's new role came a new name. Possibly to avoid confusion with the liner America, then building at Newport News Shipbuilding and Dry Dock Company, renamed United States Army Transport (USAT) Edmund B. Alexander, in keeping with the Army's policy of naming its oceangoing transports for famous general officers. This name honored Brevet Brigadier General Edmund Brooke Alexander.

Edmund B. Alexander sailed from New York in early (Note: Bykofsky has departure from "Brooklyn Army Base" on 15 January while Conn has departure from "New York" on 20 January with both citing official reports. Bykofsky cites a New York Port of Embarkation (NYPE) report. Conn cites WPD reports mainly noting slight differences in number and composition of troops.) January 1941 for Newfoundland, escorted by Coast Guard Cutter Duane, with 58 officers and 919 enlisted men. Troops were elements of the 3rd Infantry, 62nd Coast Artillery (AA) and 57th Coast Artillery for the first U.S. contingent of the Newfoundland Base Command and the Harbor Defenses of Argentia and St. John's. Arriving in a heavy snowstorm on 24 January, the ship spent four days at anchor before docking on 29 January. She remained there, a floating barracks, until troops were moved to a tent city outside St. John's and the ship returned to New York in early June 1941.

Extensive repairs in the yards of the Atlantic Basin Iron Works followed. The ship operated briefly between New Orleans and the Panama Canal Zone. Subsequently, ordered to Baltimore in May 1942, Edmund B. Alexander spent almost a year undergoing a major refit. In the overhaul, she was given a single funnel, replacing the two, and was converted to burn fuel oil instead of coal. After the refit, she could make 17 knots (31 km/h).

Edmund B. Alexander carried troops between New York and the European and Mediterranean theaters for the remainder of World War II. She was awarded a battle star for being part of Convoy KMF-25A which came under attack on 6 November 1943.

Altered in February and March 1946 to carry military dependents (904 adults—possibly war brides—and 314 children) back from Europe, she performed such duty for the next three years, including a similar voyage from Brooklyn Navy Yard through the Caribbean and Panama Canal to Hawaii and finally to Yokohama.

The ship was placed in reserve at Hawkins Point, Maryland, on 26 May 1949. Taken thence on 28 January 1951 to lay-up in the Hudson River, Edmund B. Alexander remained there for almost six more years. During this time in lay up the call back to active service never sounded. The ship was sold to the Bethlehem Steel Company of Baltimore, on 16 January 1957 and was broken up a short time later.

== Awards ==
- World War I Victory Medal with "Transport" clasp
- American Defense Service Medal
- American Campaign Medal
- European-African-Middle Eastern Campaign Medal with one battle star
- World War II Victory Medal
- Army of Occupation Medal with "Germany" and "Japan" clasps
