= Edmund Brooke Alexander =

American military officer (1802–1888)

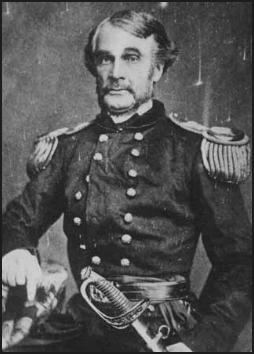
- Born: October 6, 1802; Haymarket, Virginia, U.S.
- Died: January 3, 1888 (aged 85); Washington, D.C., U.S.
- Burial place: Oakland Cemetery, St. Paul, Minnesota
- Military career
- Branch: United States Army
- Service years: 1823–1869
- Rank: Bvt. Brigadier General
- Unit: 3rd U.S. Infantry
- Commands: 10th U.S. Infantry
- Conflicts: Mexican-American War; Siege of Veracruz; Battle of Cerro Gordo; Skirmish of Ocalaca; Battle of Contreras; Battle of Churubusco; Battle of Chapultepec; Battle for Mexico City; Utah War; American Civil War

Edmund Brooke Alexander (October 6, 1802 – January 3, 1888) was an officer in the United States Army in the Mexican-American War through the American Civil War who rose to the rank of brevet Brigadier General in 1865.

== Early career ==
Alexander was born in Haymarket, Virginia and an 1823 graduate of the United States Military Academy at West Point, New York – along with Lorenzo Thomas, Alfred Mordecai and George S. Greene.

He was a cadet at the Military Academy, from October 6, 1818, to July 1, 1823, when he was graduated and promoted in the Army to Brevet Second Lieutenant in the 6th Infantry. He was shortly after promoted to Second Lieutenant in the 3d Infantry with the same date of rank.

He served on frontier duty at Fort Atkinson, Council Bluffs, Iowa, 1824; in garrison at Detroit, Mich., 1824‑25, — Green Bay, Wis., 1825‑26; Jefferson Barracks, Mo., 1826‑27; and Ft. Armstrong, Ill., 1828‑29; on Recruiting service, 1829‑30; on frontier duty at Jefferson Barracks, Mo., 1830; and at Natchitoches, Louisiana, 1830‑31.

He served at Fort Towson, in the Indian Territory from 1831 to 1835; on Quartermaster duty at Fort Towson, I. T., 1833‑34, Fort Jesup, Louisiana, 1834‑35, Fort Towson, I. T., 1835, Fort Jesup, La., 1835‑38, Fort Smith, Arkansas, 1839, Fort Towson, I. T., 1840, Fort Jesup, La., 1840, Fort Towson, I. T., 1840.

He served at Fort Smith, Arkansas from 1840 to 1846, during which he was briefly assigned to Washington, D. C. in 1844.

== Mexican War ==
Alexander was brevetted major at the Battle of Cerro Gordo on April 18, 1847, and lieutenant colonel at the Battles of Contreras and Churubusco on August 20 during the Mexican-American War.

During the War with Mexico, from 1846 to 1848, he was involved in the following battles -

- Siege of Vera Cruz, Mar. 9‑29, 1847
- Battle of Cerro Gordo, Apr. 17‑18, 1847
- Skirmish of Ocalaca, Aug. 16, 1847
- Battle of Contreras, Aug. 19‑20, 1847
- Battle of Churubusco, Aug. 20, 1847
- Storming of Chapultepec, Sep. 13, 1847
- Assault and Capture of the City of Mexico, Sep. 13‑14, 1847

After the War with Mexico was concluded he was in garrison at Jefferson Barracks, Mo., 1848‑49; on frontier duty, on march to New Mexico, 1849, Santa Fe, New Mexico, 1849‑50, Las Vegas, New Mexico, 1850‑51, Fort Union, New Mexico, 1851‑52, Fort McKavett, Texas, 1853 and the march to El Paso in late 1853.

Alexander, as a brevet lieutenant colonel, led the 8th Infantry, when it became the first garrison stationed at Fort Bliss in the El Paso, Texas, area, from January 1854 through March 1855.

In March 1855, promoted to colonel, Alexander was appointed as commander of the new 10th Infantry.

Colonel Alexander's address upon presenting the unit with regimental colors:

"Officers and Soldiers of the 10th:

"You are formed this morning in line of battle in order that I may present to you the National and Regimental colors. In your hands and to your courage and fidelity are now entrusted the honor of our country and the reputation of your corps. In time of peace so conduct yourselves that neither shall be sullied. In time of war, in the presence of an enemy, remember that these colors are far more precious than life itself; follow wherever they may lead; gather around them in moments of peril, and rather than see yourselves deprived of them, die like faithful soldiers beneath their cherished fold.

E. B. Alexander,

Colonel Commanding."

He later commanded the Utah Expedition of 1857–58 until relieved by General Albert Sidney Johnston.

He served in garrison at Carlisle Barracks, Pennsylvania, 1855; on frontier duty at Fort Snelling, Minnesota from 1855 to 1856; Fort Ridgely, Minnesota, 1856–1857, and the Utah Expedition, 1857 to 1858. He was on a leave of absence from 1858 to 1860.

== Civil War ==
Alexander was on frontier duty at Fort Laramie, Dakota Territory from 1860 to 1862. He then transferred to Fort Kearny, Nebraska, where he served until 1863.

Alexander served during the American Civil War as Acting Assistant Provost Marshal General, Superintendent of Volunteer Recruiting Service, and Chief Mustering and Disbursing Officer for the State of Missouri, with headquarters at St. Louis from May 1, 1863, to Apr. 25, 1866.

== Post war ==
After the war, he was in command of 10th Infantry at Fort Snelling, Minnesota from May, 1866 until he retired from active service on February 22, 1869, under the Law of July 17, 1862, as he was over "the Age of 62 Years."

General Alexander died on January 3, 1888, at Washington, D.C., at the age of 85. He was buried in Oakland Cemetery in St. Paul, Minnesota.

== Promotions ==
- Second lieutenant, 3d Infantry – July 1, 1823
- First lieutenant, 3d Infantry – December 29, 1827
- Assistant quartermaster – December 6, 1833, to July 7, 1838
- Captain, staff, assistant quartermaster – July 7, 1838 to June 18, 1846
- Captain, 3d Infantry – July 7, 1838
- Brevet major – Apr. 18, 1847 (For Gallant and Meritorious Conduct in the Battle of Cerro Gordo, Mexico.)
- Brevet lieutenant colonel – Aug. 20, 1847 (For Gallant and Meritorious Conduct in the Battles of Contreras and Churubusco, Mexico.)
- Major, 8th Infantry – November 10, 1851
- Colonel, 10th Infantry – March 3, 1855
- Brevet brigadier general – October 18, 1865 (For Meritorious Services in the Recruitment of the Armies of the United States.)

== Namesake ==
In World War II, a United States Army transport ship, Edmund B. Alexander, was named in his honor.
