= Harry Manning =

United States Navy admiral

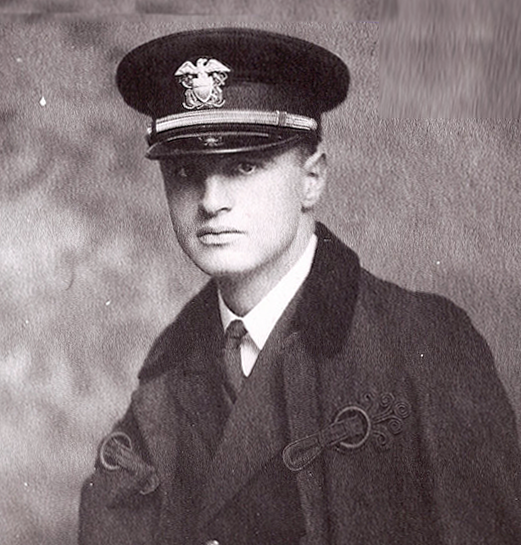
- 1929 publicity image of Chief Officer Harry Manning.
- Born: February 3, 1897; Hamburg, Germany
- Died: August 1, 1974 (aged 77) Saddle River, New Jersey, US
- Allegiance: United States
- Branch: United States Merchant Marine 1914–1953, United States Navy 1941–1953
- Service years: 1941–1953
- Rank: Vice Admiral
- Commands: SS President Roosevelt; SS George Washington; SS President Harding; USMSTS American Navigator; SS America; SS United States

Vice Admiral Harry Manning (February 3, 1897 – August 1, 1974) was an American master mariner, aviator, and an officer in the United States Navy Reserve. He is most noted for his heroic role in the rescue of 32 crew members from Italian freighter Florida and for commanding the SS United States on her record-breaking maiden crossings of the Atlantic. He was among those honored in two ticker tape parades: the first in 1929 as a crew member of the America and again in 1952 as master of the SS United States. As an aviator, Manning served as a navigator for Amelia Earhart.

== Early life ==
Harry Manning was born as Harry Luelker in Hamburg, Germany on February 3, 1897. When his mother Anna married William Edwards Manning, a British diplomat, his name was changed to that of his stepfather. (His legal middle initial, "V", was rarely used and appeared in only one publication.) His parents moved to New York City when he has about ten years old but his stepfather died soon after. His short stature, only 5.5 feet (1.7 m), and a slight physical build subjected him to what would now be called bullying. He responded to the taunts by engaging in fistfights, and even took boxing lessons. He enrolled in the New York State Nautical School which at that time was based on the training ship Newport and taught grammar school subjects in addition to seamanship, graduating in 1914. His first job at sea was on the liner St. Paul, where he became the quartermaster on the second voyage. He would however be fired after a voyage to Nantucket when he suffered seasickness in choppy seas and failed to execute a maneuver. He next went to the Pacific where he used his experience with sail (the training ship Newport was a sail/steam hybrid) on board the bark Dirigio. He next served on Army transports and on freighters of the Isthmian Steamship Company.

== United States Lines ==
He joined the United States Lines in 1922 and advanced up the officer ranks on the liners George Washington and Leviathan. He received his first command in 1927 as master of the President Roosevelt.

Manning came to national attention in 1929 when the report of his role in the rescue of the crew from the Italian freighter Florida appeared on the front page of The New York Times. That January, Manning was serving on the America as her Chief Officer. Then commanded by Captain George Fried, America was steaming from France to New York. As she battled her way through a major storm, the liner picked up distress signals from Florida. Guided by her radio direction finder, the American ship homed in on the endangered ship and finally sighted the listing vessel through light snow squalls. Taking a position off Florida's weather beam, America lowered her number one lifeboat, commanded by Manning, with a crew of eight men.

After the boat had been rowed to within 50 feet (15 m) of Florida, Manning had a line thrown across to the crew of the distressed freighter. One by one, the 32 men from the Italian ship came across the rope. By the time the last of them, the ship's captain, had been dragged on board the pitching lifeboat, the winds had reached gale force, with violent snow and rain squalls, with a high, rough, sea running. Then, via ladders, ropes, cargo nets, and two homemade breeches buoys, sailors on board America brought up Florida's survivors, until all 32 were safely aboard. Finally, they pulled their shipmates from the rescue party back on board. Chief Officer Manning was brought up last. On January 28 Captain Fried and the crew of the America were honored in a ticker tape parade. Manning even appeared in a cigarette advertisement. At that time celebrity endorsements were common in tobacco advertising but Manning reputedly was a non-smoker.

His interest in navigation and air transport led him to become a pilot in 1930. Manning first met Amelia Earhart in 1928. She was returning from her transatlantic crossing as a passenger on the President Harding and Manning was the master. Close in age and with a mutual interest in aviation, the two became friends en route. In January 1937 the United States Lines granted him a leave of absence to serve as a navigator for Amelia Earhart's attempt to circumnavigate the globe. Manning made extensive preparations for the flight which began on March 17, 1937 from Oakland, California. Earhart's plane was damaged in Honolulu and required extensive repairs. There are conflicting accounts on why Manning left her crew at this point. In one account, Manning was unable to extend his leave of absence and had to return to the United States Lines. Another version claims that he was concerned about her "aggressive" handling of the plane. Earhart would continue on but later disappeared near Howland Island.

The following year Manning sustained critical injuries when his own plane crashed near Roosevelt Field, in Long Island. He suffered fractures to both legs, his skull and chest injuries. After his recovery he decided to cease flying.

== WWII service ==
In July 1940 the United States had not yet entered WWII and was considered a neutral country. Manning was on the bridge of the liner Washington, off the coast of Europe, when a German U-boat surfaced and immediately signaled for him to abandon ship, which would then be torpedoed. Manning's replies identified his ship as flying the neutral United States flag. While the messages were relayed, Manning ordered his passengers and crew to lifeboat stations. The U‐boat commander eventually told him to proceed, adding “thought you were another vessel.”

Manning was made captain of the America (which replaced the 1905 vessel by that name) but his tenure was cut short when the United States Lines ended all commercial service and its ships were refitted for war time transport. When the United States officially entered WWII in 1941, Manning went on active duty in the Navy. As a Navy Reserve Lieutenant Commander he served on the Washington, now the troop ship Mount Vernon. In 1942 he was promoted to Commander and captain of the training ship American Navigator. Later in the war he was superintendent of the US Maritime Service training stations at Huntington, Hoffman Island, and Avalon.

== Postwar and the Blue Riband ==
At the end of the war, Manning returned to the United States Lines. He was named Commodore and resumed his duties as master of the America after the vessel returned to commercial passenger service.

In March 1952, the new flagship United States was nearing completion and the United States Lines made the formal announcement of Manning as her master. Manning was already preparing for her first crossing in 1951 when he met with representatives from the ship's designers and the US Lines in his captain's quarters on the America. They were already considering breaking the transatlantic speed record for the Blue Riband and discussed how far the ship should be pushed on her first voyage. The maiden crossing began at noon on July 3, 1952. The publicity over the new ship and the secrecy over her speed fed speculation that the ship would try for the eastbound speed record. When asked by reporters on board Manning coyly replied, "If the ship makes a record, I can't help that." The first day out the ship was averaging 34 knots. The weather deteriorated July 4–5 with heavy fog and choppy seas, but the ship still averaged 35 knots. When the ship passed Bishop's Rock, the traditional Blue Riband finish point, on the morning of July 7 her exact crossing time was 3 days, 10 hours, and 40 minutes. Manning followed his plan to use a bit more power each day: 34.11 knots, 35.60, 36.17 and then 36.21.

The return trip would be made in 3 days, 12 hours, and 12 minutes. Manning had to slow the ship through fog and heavy traffic patterns yet still averaged 34.51 knots. On July 18, he participated in the second ticker tape parade of his career when he and his crew were honored for setting the new speed record crossing the Atlantic.

Manning's time as master of the United States was to be short lived as he was removed after the second round trip. Officially he said that he was tired from the little sleep he had on the maiden crossings. However, tensions had long been brewing among the unions, the ship's designer, and the United States Lines management. He was a vocal critic of maritime labor unions and refused to join the Masters, Mates, & Pilots organization. He clashed with designer William Francis Gibbs regarding the operation of the ship. Improvements in ship to shore communications had allowed shore side management to monitor the day-to-day operation of the ship. Management was furious over Manning appearing to be racing against Cunard's Queen Elizabeth. Manning would make only a few relief trips after that. He was brought back for the official presentation of the Blue Riband Hales Trophy on November 12, 1952. He made his last trip in March 1953. He was retained as a consultant to the US Lines and retired as commodore for the United States Lines and as a Vice Admiral in the US Navy Reserve.

== Personal life ==
On January 30, 1940 Manning married Florence Isabella Trowbridge Heaton (1916–2008). Also a pilot, she had met him in 1934 and shared his interest in aviation. Their union produced a daughter, Florence, but they divorced in 1942.

After his retirement from the United States Lines he married Mildred Bachmann Eisenhardt (1902–1988); they remained married until his death.

While Manning's formal education was limited, he was self-taught on several subjects and could quote lines from Shakespeare's Troilus and Cressida. He was regarded as an excellent dancer and the ship stewards sent him the best dance partners. He was however uncomfortable in making small talk but did learn the social graces needed to host the captain's table. His passenger receptions tended to be small, formal, and brief and if it dragged on he would say that he had to go to the bridge to cut it short. During his convalescence from his 1938 accident he had learned to play the piano, and even had a grand piano in his quarters on the America.

Manning had a reputation for being hot-tempered and very self-assured. In recalling an altercation with the master of the Leviathan he admitted, "I was an awful son of a bitch in those days." Of his own skills he once remarked, "Navigation in bad weather was my specialty." One passenger remarked, "You don’t always get a glad hand when you sail with Manning, but you feel damned safe."

He retired to a quiet and private life of lecturing and consultant work. He died at his home in Saddle River, NJ on August 1, 1974. He was buried at Arlington National Cemetery with the rank "Captain, US Navy", his rank at the end of WWII.
