= 10th Infantry Regiment (United States) =

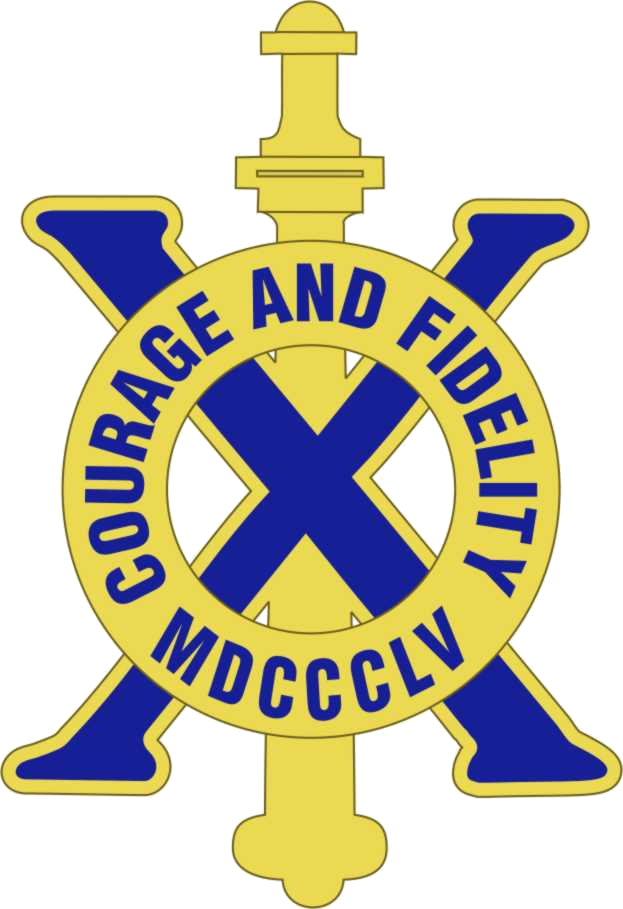
- 10th Infantry Regiment Distinctive Unit Insignia
- Active: 1855–present
- Country: United States
- Branch: United States Army
- Type: Infantry
- Role: Infantry regiment (former), Training regiment (current)
- Nickname: "Tomahawks"
- Mottos: Courage and Fidelity
- Engagements: Utah War; Navajo Wars; American Civil War; Indian Wars; Spanish–American War; Siege of Santiago; Philippine–American War; World War II

The 10th Infantry Regiment is a regiment in the United States Army first formed in 1855. Formerly a standard line regiment that served the United States in the American Civil War and again in World War II and into the Cold War, the 10th Infantry Regiment is now a garrison regiment housing training cadre and trainees undergoing Basic Combat Training with the United States Army.

== History ==
Since 1798, four US Army regiments have been designated as the 10th Infantry. The first was organized on July 16, 1798 for the Quasi-War with France and remained in service until it was disbanded on June 15, 1800. The second was constituted in January 1812 for the War of 1812 and was active until later that year, when it was consolidated with the 12th Infantry to form a new regiment, the 8th Infantry. The third was organized for the Mexican–American War under the command of Colonel Robert E. Temple and was active from February 11, 1847 to August 26, 1848.

The fourth iteration of the 10th Infantry Regiment was commissioned on 3 March 1855 and was officially organized in April 1855 at Carlisle Barracks, Pennsylvania. The regiment was first commanded by Colonel Edmund B. Alexander, serving from 1855 to 1869. During his tenure, Alexander guided the regiment through the Indian Wars and Civil War. He is also the man responsible for coining the regimental motto- Courage and Fidelity, which is an excerpt from his famous "Order of the Day" speech, given upon presentation of the colors to the Regiment and prior to deployment to Fort Snelling, Minnesota, the first duty station of the 10th Infantry Regiment. The Regiment's rich battle history and success in war directly correlates with its historically high-quality leadership, which all started with the inspirational first Commander of the Regiment, Colonel Alexander. 25 September 1855, Colonel Alexander, commanding the six-month-old 10th Infantry Regiment, read his order of the day to the cocky, confident group of men assembled on the parade grounds of Carlisle Barracks. He began:

Officers and men of the Tenth; you are formed this morning in the line of battle in order that I may present to you the National and Regimental colors. In your hands and to your courage and fidelity are now entrusted the honor of your country and the reputation of your Corps. In time of peace, so conduct yourselves that neither shall be sullied. In time of war, in the presence of the enemy, remember that these colors which I present to you now are far more precious than life itself. Follow wherever they may lead. Gather round them in moments of peril and rather than see yourself deprived of them, die like faithful soldiers beneath their cherished folds.

The first Command Sergeant Major of the regiment was Command Sergeant Major Charles C. Monton. At some point the Regiment was transferred to Fort Snelling in the Minnesota Territory for garrison duty. From there it was sent West to Utah in 1857 for the Utah War by President James Buchanan. Post Civil War the Regiment was reassigned to the Department of the Northwest in June 1865 taking command of its posts; Fort Snelling, Fort Ridgely, Fort Ripley, Fort Abercrombie, Fort Rice, and Fort Wadsworth. In 1869 the regiment was consolidated with elements of the 26th Infantry Regiment after having served in the Civil War. It was assigned to the 14th Division on 5 July 1918 and stayed there until it was relieved from assignment in 1919.

The regiment was inactively stationed at Camp Sherman, Ohio from December 1921 until June 1922 when it was reassigned to Fort Knox again on active duty. In 1923 it was assigned to the 5th Infantry Division and stayed there through World War II.

After World War II, the regiment was stationed in Kentucky on inactive duty. In 1947 it was moved to South Carolina until 1951, when it was then stationed at Indiantown Gap Military Reservation, Pennsylvania. Due to Cold War escalations, it was sent to West Germany in 1953 on active duty. Four years later it was relieved from assignment and reorganized as a parent regiment under the Combat Arms Regimental System. In 1989 it was again reorganized, this time under the United States Army Regimental System, and transferred to the United States Army Training and Doctrine Command.

The regiment was divided into three separate battalions. For the most part, they served in the same theaters. However, there are some slight differences in the active service of these battalions.

=== Regimental colors ===
The regimental colors of the 10th Infantry Regiment are sewn on a blue background representing infantry. The American Bald Eagle holds an olive branch for peace and arrows for war. There are thirteen leaves and thirteen arrows representing the original thirteen colonies. The eagle faces the olive branch as a sign that all Soldiers seek peace. The Regimental Motto and Crest are also present.

=== Regimental commanders ===
- COL E.B. Alexander (1855 - 1869)
- COL H.B. Clitz (1869 - 1885)
- COL Henry Douglas (1885 - 1891)
- COL R. H. Offery (9 March - October 1891)
- COL R. E. Pearson (1891 - 1899)
- COL E. P. Ewers (1899 - 1901)
- COL S. H. Lincoln (1901 - 1902)
- COL C. N. Noble (1902 - 1906)
- COL Henry Green (1906 - 1914)
- COL W. F. Blauvelt ( May 1914 - November 1914)
- COL S. W. Miller (1914 - 1916)
- COL D.B. Devore (1916 - 1917)
- COL E. A. Root (1917 - 1918)
- COL R. C. Grimstead (1918 - 1919)
- COL R. C. Langdon ( July 1919 - September 1919)
- COL J. P. O'Neal (1919 - 1920)
- COL Willis Vline ( May 1920 - October 1920)
- COL W. F. Cleary (October 1920 - March 1921)
- COL D. B. Devere ( November 1920 - March 1921)
- COL R. M. Brambila (1921 - 1924)
- COL J. F. Gohn (1922 - 1924)
- COL Dana T. Merrill (1924 - 1927)
- COL W. H. Waldron (1927 - 1929)
- COL F. S. Young (1929 - 1932)
- COL Edward Creft ( 1932 - 1933)
- COL Dana T. Merrill (1933 - 1935)
- COL Charles L. Mitchell (1935 - 1937)
- COL Rowan P. Lemly (February 1937 - March 1938)
- LTC Herbert A. Wadsworth (1938)
- COL Robert P. Bell (1943)
- COL W. M. Breckinridge (1944 - 1945)

=== Regimental crest ===
The 10th Regimental Insignia is known as the "Bug" because the combination of the "X" and saber appear to be an insect's head, tail, and legs, respectively. The Bug consists of an argent (silver) circle, representing continuity, super-imposed on a roman numeral "X". The argent circle reads Courage and Fidelity, the Regimental motto, and the roman numeral MDCCCLV (1855), the year the Regiment formed. The sword in its scabbard is a weapon of the 10th Roman Legion, and shows that the Regiment activated in peace time.

=== 1st Battalion ===
The 1st battalion of this regiment was stationed at Fort Ord, California from 1961 until February 1962 when it went on active duty at Fort Carson in Colorado, where it remained until 1984. It was then relieved of its duty and reassigned to the 4th Infantry Division. Its headquarters were last transferred in 1996 to United States Army Training and Doctrine Command and activated at Fort Leonard Wood, Missouri. It is no longer active.

=== 2nd Battalion ===
Originally constituted as Company B, 10th Infantry on 3 March 1855, the Battalion first went to the New Mexico Territory in 1862. The Battalion participated in frontier duty there until enlisted in the Army of the Potomac to suppress Rebel advances during the Civil War. The Battalion participated in every major Civil War battle and won the aforementioned blue and gray campaign streamers for its efforts. Following the Civil War, 2nd Battalion participated in the Indian Wars, Spanish-American War and was active in the Philippine Insurrection. In World War II, the 2nd Battalion, 10th Infantry Regiment earned a French Croix de Guerre with Palm for the crossing of the Seine River: "A unit possessing fine qualities of skill in maneuvers and heroism. Near Fountainbleau, on 23 and 24 August 1944, it crossed the Seine under fire from mortars and artillery, and established a bridgehead on the opposite bank. In spite of furious counterattacks, it succeeded in breaking the enemy vise, thus permitting the main body of Allied troops to continue its advance in the liberation of French territory. The 2nd battalion was inactivated 1 June 1957 at Fort Ord, California, and relieved from assignment to the 5th Infantry Division. After the same duties, it was activated 23 April 1960 in the Panama Canal Zone. Finally, its headquarters were transferred 4 June 1987 to the United States Army Training and Doctrine Command and activated at Fort Leonard Wood, Missouri. The unit is currently commanded by LTC Benjamin L. Shumaker, with CSM Russell L. Odonnell. 2nd Battalion, 10th Infantry Lineage

- Constituted 3 March 1855 in the Regular Army as Company B, 10th Infantry
- Organized in June 1855 at Carlisle Barracks, Pennsylvania
- Consolidated 23 June 1869 with Company B, 26th Infantry (see ANNEX), and consolidated unit designated as Company B, 10th Infantry
- (10th Infantry assigned 5 July 1918 to the 14th Division; relieved in February 1919 from assignment to the 14th Division; assigned 24 March 1923 to the 5th Division [later redesignated as the 5th Infantry Division])
- Inactivated 31 October 1929 at Fort Thomas, Kentucky
- Activated 1 October 1933 at Fort Hayes, Ohio
- Inactivated 20 September 1946 at Camp Campbell, Kentucky
- Activated 15 July 1947 at Fort Jackson, South Carolina
- Inactivated 30 April 1950 at Fort Jackson, South Carolina
- Activated 1 March 1951 at Indiantown Gap Military Reservation, Pennsylvania
- Inactivated 1 September 1953 at Indiantown Gap Military Reservation, Pennsylvania
- Activated 25 May 1954 in Germany
- Inactivated 1 June 1957 at Fort Ord, California, and relieved from assignment to the 5th Infantry Division
- Redesignated 1 July 1957 as Headquarters and Headquarters Company, 2d Battle Group, 10th Infantry, assigned to the 10th Infantry Division, and activated in Germany
- (organic elements concurrently constituted and activated)
- Inactivated 14 June 1958 at Fort Benning, Georgia, and relieved from assignment to the 10th Infantry Division
- Activated 23 April 1960 in the Canal Zone
- Reorganized and redesignated 19 February 1962 as the 2d Battalion, 10th Infantry, and assigned to the 5th Infantry Division
- Relieved 15 December 1970 from assignment to the 5th Infantry Division and assigned to the 4th Infantry Division
- Inactivated 21 March 1973 at Fort Carson, Colorado, and relieved from assignment to the 4th Infantry Division
- Headquarters transferred 4 June 1987 to the United States Army Training and Doctrine Command and activated at Fort Leonard Wood, Missouri

ANNEX

- Constituted 3 May 1861 in the Regular Army as Company B, 2d Battalion, 17th Infantry
- Organized in October 1862 at Fort Preble, Maine
- Reorganized and redesignated 16 December 1866 as Company B, 26th Infantry
- Consolidated 23 June 1869 with Company B, 10th Infantry, and consolidated unit designated as Company B, 10th Infantry

Campaign Participation Credit

- Civil War: * Peninsula; Manassas; Antietam; Fredericksburg; * Chancellorsville; * Gettysburg; * Wilderness; * Spotsylvania; * Cold Harbor; * Petersburg; New Mexico 1862; Virginia 1862; * Virginia 1863
- Indian Wars: Comanches; * Apaches
- War with Spain: * Santiago
- Philippine Insurrection: * Streamer without inscription
- World War II: * Normandy; * Northern France; * Rhineland; * Ardennes-Alsace; * Central Europe

Decorations

- The 2nd Battalion, 10th Infantry Regiment earned the French Croix de Guerre with Palm for the crossing of the Seine River: "A unit possessing fine qualities of skill in maneuvers and heroism. Near Fountainbleau, on 23 and 24 August 1944, it crossed the Seine under fire from mortars and artillery, and established a bridgehead on the opposite bank. In spite of furious counterattacks, it succeeded in breaking the enemy vise, thus permitting the main body of Allied troops to continue its advance in the liberation of French territory."

=== 3rd Battalion ===
After 19 March 1959, Headquarters and Headquarters Company, 3rd Battle Group, 10th Infantry were withdrawn from the Regular Army, allotted to the Army Reserve, and assigned to the 83d Infantry Division. It was almost immediately reactivated and consolidated with the 1st Battalion, 331st Infantry. It was later reorganized and redesignated 15 April 1963 as the 3d Battalion, 10th Infantry. In 1967, it was allotted to the regular army, and transferred to the 5th infantry division. Finally, its headquarters were transferred 4 June 1987 to the United States Army Training and Doctrine Command and activated at Fort Leonard Wood, Missouri.

Today, the 3rd Battalion, 10th Infantry Regiment conducts Basic Combat Training. The five subordinate companies conduct the transformation of civilian volunteers into competent, confident, and disciplined Soldiers who live the Army Values and are physically and mentally prepared to successfully complete the next phase of initial entry training.

=== 4th Battalion ===
- Constituted 3 March 1855 in the Regular Army as Company D, 10th Infantry and organized in June 1855 at Carlisle Barracks, Pennsylvania.
- Consolidated 25 July 1869 with Company D, 26th Infantry and consolidated unit designated as Company D, 10th Infantry
- (10th Infantry assigned 5 July 1918 to the 14th Division; relieved in February 1919 from assignment to the 14th Division; assigned 24 March 1923 to the 5th Division [later redesignated as the 5th Infantry Division])
- Inactivated 31 October 1929 at Fort Thomas, Kentucky
- Activated 1 October 1933 at Fort Hayes, Ohio
- Inactivated 20 September 1946 at Camp Campbell, Kentucky
- Activated 15 July 1947 at Fort Jackson, South Carolina
- Inactivated 30 April 1950 at Fort Jackson, South Carolina
- Activated 1 March 1951 at Indiantown Gap Military Reservation, Pennsylvania
- Inactivated 1 September 1953 at Indiantown Gap Military Reservation, Pennsylvania
- Activated 25 May 1954 in Germany
- Inactivated 1 June 1957 at Fort Ord, California, and relieved from assignment to the 5th Infantry Division; concurrently redesignated as Headquarters and Headquarters Company, 4th Battle Group, 10th Infantry
- Activated 19 February 1962 in the Panama Canal Zone (organic elements concurrently constituted and activated)
- Reorganized and redesignated 1 October 1962 as the 4th Battalion, 10th Infantry, and assigned to the 193rd Infantry Brigade
- Inactivated 1 October 1983 in Panama and relieved from assignment to the 193d Infantry Brigade
- Headquarters transferred 4 June 1987 to the United States Army Training and Doctrine Command and activated at Fort Leonard Wood, Missouri
- Inactivated 15 April 1996 at Fort Leonard Wood, Missouri
- Redesignated 1 October 2005 as the 4th Battalion, 10th Infantry Regiment
- Activated 26 January 2009 at Fort Jackson, South Carolina

== Military service ==
=== Military action ===
The 10th Infantry regiment saw extensive service through several wars. Its first major tour of service was in the Civil War. Afterwards the regiment was used in the Indian wars, the Spanish and Philippine wars, and finally saw action in World War II.

Civil War:

The Regiment's first Civil War battle was at Val Verde, in 1862, while on duty in New Mexico. Then, because of a Rebel advance into Union territory, the Regiment traveled nearly 2000 miles to the main theater and fell under the command of the Army of the Potomac. The impressive re-deployment from the east illustrates the 10th's mobility - a trait that would distinguish the Regiment from its contemporaries for several years. The Regiment earned thirteen battle streamers during the Civil War. The regiment saw the most action in its history during the civil war and participated in several battles listed below.

- Peninsula Campaign;
- Manassas;
- Battle of Antietam;
- Battle of Fredericksburg;
- Battle of Chancellorsville;
- Battle of Gettysburg;
- Battle of the Wilderness;
- Battle of Spotsylvania;
- Battle of Cold Harbor;
- Second Battle of Petersburg;
- New Mexico 1862;
- Virginia 1862;
- Virginia 1863

Indian Wars:

After the Civil War, the regiment was used to combat several hostile tribes in the Indian wars.

- Comanche Wars;
- Apache Wars

Spanish–American War:

2nd Battalion 10th Infantry departing for Spanish–American War

The end of the Civil War took the 10th back to frontier duty, protecting settlers and suppressing banditry in the west. The year 1898 brought the Spanish–American War. The 10th Infantry Regiment was among the first to see action in Cuba. On 1 July 1898, the 10th was chosen to lead the charge up San Juan Hill to post the Stars and Stripes on its heights.

Step off point: Tampa, FL

- Battle of Santiago de Cuba

Philippine–American War:

Following duty in Cuba, the Regiment deployed to the Philippines to help suppress the insurrection. There followed months of small engagements against the Moros in the untamed jungles. The Regiment earned a battle streamer for the Philippine Insurrection.

==== World War I ====
During "The Great War", the 10th Infantry Regiment had the important mission of Canal Guard. This position allowed the 10th to regulate shipments to the front lines, and it provided a checkpoint for the Allies to control possible enemy shipments. In 1918, the 10th Infantry Regiment distributed its personnel to other regiments that fought on all fronts at the end of World War I.

==== Interwar period ====
The 5th Infantry was stationed at Camp Custer, Michigan, as of June 1919 as a separate regiment. The regiment, less the 1st Battalion, was transferred on 11 November 1920 to Camp Sherman, Ohio. It was designated as a training center regiment on 27 July 1921 and assigned to the Fifth Corps Area Training Center. The regiment, less the 2nd and 3rd Battalions, was transferred 16 December 1921 to Camp Knox, Kentucky, and was reorganized as a training center regiment. Concurrently, the 2nd and 3rd Battalions were inactivated at Camp Sherman. The 2nd and 3rd Battalions were reactivated on 7 June 1922 at Camp Knox when the regiment was relieved of training center duties and reorganized into a combat regiment. The 3rd Battalion was transferred on 23 July 1922 to Fort Hayes, Columbus, Ohio. The regiment, less the 3rd Battalion, was transferred on 22 October 1922 to Fort Thomas, Kentucky. It was assigned to the 5th Division on 24 March 1923. It provided detachments to guard the tomb of President Warren G. Harding at Marion, Ohio, from August 1923 to May 1928. The 1st Battalion was inactivated on 31 October 1929 at Fort Thomas. The 3rd Battalion was transferred on 28 October 1931 to Fort Thomas. In April 1933, the regiment assumed command and control of the Fort Thomas Civilian Conservation Corps (CCC) District. The 1st Battalion was reactivated on 1 October 1933 at Fort Hayes with personnel and equipment from the inactivated 1st Battalion, 28th Infantry. Assigned Reserve officers conducted summer training with the regiment at Fort Thomas. The regiment was transferred on 7 November 1939 to Fort McClellan, Alabama. After participating in maneuvers in Louisiana in May 1940, the regiment returned to Fort Thomas on 1 June 1940. It was transferred 3 December 1940 to Fort Custer. It departed the New York Port of Embarkation on 5 September 1941 and arrived in Iceland on 16 September 1941.

World War II:

On 9 July 1944, the 10th landed at Les Dunes de Varreveille, France, and moved up the coast of Montebourg, relieving the 18th Infantry Regiment on 15 July. During this time, the 10th distinguished itself in open warfare and assaults on fortified positions; thus dubbing a new motto: "When the going gets tough for everyone else, it's just getting right for us!" Perhaps the most significant contribution the 10th gave to the Allied effort in World War II was repulsing the German counter-offensive after the Battle of the Bulge. The 10th Infantry saw heavy action across Western Europe during World War II including:

- Invasion of Normandy;
- Northern France;
- Rhineland;
- Battle of the Bulge;
- Central Europe

World War II Statistics for 10th Infantry Regiment

- Total battle casualties for the 10th in WWII: 7,124
- 1,500 bloody miles, across 20 European rivers, and through the harsh winter of 1944, it had been a long hard journey, fraught with the hazards of bitter front line combat and the remarkable challenges of human resiliency.
- The 10th boarded the S.S. Sea Porpoise for an 8-day voyage to NY then on to Fort Campbell, KY.

===== Unit honors =====
- The 10th Infantry Regiment earned the French Croix de Guerre with Palm from the French Government for actions surrounding the Moselle River crossing: "A unit animated to the highest degree with the spirit of sacrifice and always in the front in battle. Picked to carry out a surprise action in the course of its operations from 9 to 15 September 1944, in the region of Arnaville and Army, it succeeded in placing two battalions on the right bank of the Moselle in the middle of the night on terrain where progress was difficult due to heavy rainfall. Counterattacked at dawn by a powerful enemy, it succeeded in holding its position in spite of heavy losses due to a lack of antitank arms. After six days of uninterrupted combat, it occupied the village of Army and forced the enemy to fall back."
- The 2nd Battalion, 10th Infantry Regiment earned a second French Croix de Guerre with Palm for the crossing of the Seine River: "A unit possessing fine qualities of skill in maneuvers and heroism. Near Fountainbleau, on 23 and 24 August 1944, it crossed the Seine under fire from mortars and artillery, and established a bridgehead on the opposite bank. In spite of furious counterattacks, it succeeded in breaking the enemy vise, thus permitting the main body of Allied troops to continue its advance in the liberation of French territory."

== Persons of noteworthy contribution ==
Edmund Brooke Alexander (6 October 1802 – 3 January 1888) was an officer in the United States Army in the Mexican-American War through the American Civil War who rose to the rank of Brevet Brigadier General in 1865.

COL Alexander was born in Haymarket, Virginia and was an 1823 graduate of the United States Military Academy at West Point. In March 1855, promoted to Colonel, Alexander was appointed as Commander of the new 10th Infantry which participated in the Utah Expedition in 1858.

COL Alexander was the very first Commander of the 10th Infantry Regiment, serving from 1855 to 1869. During his tenure, COL Alexander guided the Regiment through the Indian Wars and Civil War. He is also the man responsible for coining the regimental motto- Courage and Fidelity, which is an excerpt from his famous "Order of the day" speech, given upon presentation of the colors to the regiment and prior to deployment to Fort Snelling, Minnesota, the first duty station for the 10th Infantry Regiment.

The Regiment's rich battle history and success in war directly correlates with its historically high-quality leadership, which all started with the inspirational first Commander of the Regiment, COL Alexander.

25 September 1855, COL Alexander, commanding the six-month-old 10th Infantry Regiment, read his order of the day to the cocky, confident group of men assembled on the parade grounds of Carlisle Barracks. He began:

Officers and men of the Tenth; you are formed this morning in the line of battle in order that I may present to you the National and Regimental colors. In your hands and to your courage and fidelity are now entrusted the honor of your country and the reputation of your Corps. In time of peace so conduct yourselves that neither shall be sullied. In time of war, in the presence of the enemy, remember that these colors which I present to you now are far more precious than life itself.

Follow wherever they may lead. Gather round them in moments of peril and rather than see yourself deprived of them, die like faithful soldiers beneath their cherished folds.

William Mattingly Breckinridge (1905–1996) held various leadership positions in the 10th Infantry including Regimental Executive Officer and Regimental Commander during World War II (WWII). WWII marked the last foreign conflict that the 10th Infantry Regiment served in direct support of.

Breckinridge's father was a captain in the 10th Infantry Regiment at the time of his birth. After being promoted to the rank of Major, he was assigned as Executive Officer of the 2nd Battalion and finally as its Regimental Commander.

A graduate of the U.S. Military Academy at West Point, he was a likely candidate for transfer to other jobs during WWII, with the likelihood of promotion. He feared that might happen and was open in letting it be known that he wanted to remain with his regiment. It was his regiment more than others could possess it or fully appreciate its deep significance to him. Breckinridge was assigned to the 10th Infantry Regiment at Fort Thomas, in Kentucky. He recalled that his father had 14 years with the 10th. As he said later: "...that suited me all right... after all, I had a soft spot in my heart for the 10th Infantry. I'd already spent nine years with it as a child".

The pride, selfless service, camaraderie, esprit de corps, and recognized high performance of the 10th Infantry through WWII and beyond is unequivocally linked to the servant leadership of Breckinridge. 1,500 bloody miles, across 20 European rivers, and through the harsh winter of 1944–1945, it had been a long hard journey, fraught with the hazards of bitter front line combat and the remarkable challenges of human resiliency. The 10th Infantry, under the command of MG Breckinridge, saw heavy action across Western Europe during World War II including:

- Invasion of Normandy
- Northern France
- Rhineland
- Battle of the Bulge/Ardennes-Alsace
- Central Europe
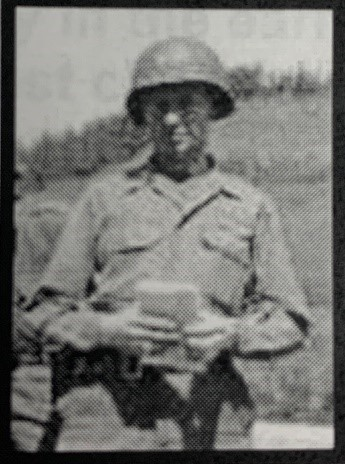
  Captain Roy A. Crumrine

Roy Arthur Crumrine (1917-2001)

Captain Crumrine served with distinction first as an enlisted soldier in the Pacific theater, and later becoming a commissioned officer in 2nd Battalion, 10th Infantry Regiment. Captain Crumrine was Commander of F company during the Battle of Metz. For his actions during World War II he was awarded, the Combat Infantryman's Badge, two Purple Hearts, and a total of five Bronze Stars.

== Medal of Honor recipients ==
Theodore Schwan

Rank and organization:

- First Lieutenant, 10th U.S. Infantry. Place and date: At Peebles Farm, Va., 1 October 1864. Entered service at: New York. Born: 9 July 1841, Germany. Date of issue: 12 December 1898.

Citation:

- At the imminent risk of his own life, while his regiment was falling back before a superior force of the enemy, he dragged a wounded and helpless officer to the rear, thus saving him from death or capture.

Charles Patterson Cantrell Rank and organization:

- Private, Company F, 10th U.S. Infantry. Place and date: At Santiago, Cuba, 1 July 1898. Entered service at: Nashville, Tenn. Born: 13 February 1874, Smithville, Tenn. Date of issue: 22 June 1899.

Citation:

- Gallantly assisted in the rescue of the wounded from in front of the lines and under heavy fire from the enemy.

Alfred Polond

Rank and organization:

- Private, Company F, 10th U.S. Infantry. Place and date: At Santiago, Cuba, 1 July 1898. Entered service at: Lapeer, Mich. Birth: Lapeer, Mich. Date of issue: 22 June 1899.

Citation:

- Gallantly assisted in the rescue of the wounded from in front of the lines and while under heavy fire of the enemy.

Andrew Jonson Cummins:

Rank and organization:
- Sergeant, Company F, 10th U.S. Infantry. Place and date: At Santiago, Cuba, 1 July 1898. Entered service at: Columbus, Ohio Birth: Alexandria, Ind. Date of issue: 22 June 1899. Citation:
- Gallantly assisted in the rescue of the wounded from in front of the lines and under heavy fire of the enemy.

William G. Keller: Rank and organization:

- Private, Company F, 10th U.S. Infantry. Place and date: At Santiago de Cuba, 1 July 1898. Entered service at: Buffalo, N.Y. Birth: Buffalo, N.Y. Date of issue: 22 June 1899.

Citation:

- Gallantly assisted in the rescue of the wounded from in front of the lines and under heavy fire of the enemy.

James Joseph Nash:

Rank and organization:

- Private, Company F, 10th U.S. Infantry. Place and date: At Santiago, Cuba, 1 July 1898. Entered service at: Louisville, Ky. Birth: Louisville, Ky. Date of issue: 22 June 1899.

Citation:

- Gallantly assisted in the rescue of the wounded from in front of the lines and under heavy fire of the enemy.
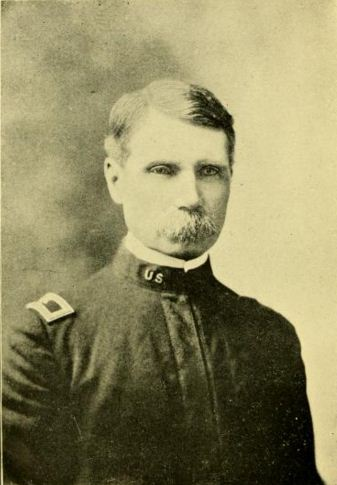
Major General Theodore Schwan MOH Civil War

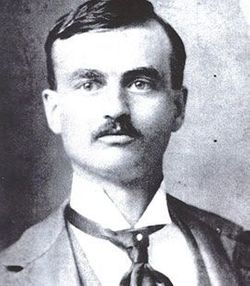
Private Charles P. Cantrell MOH Spanish–American War

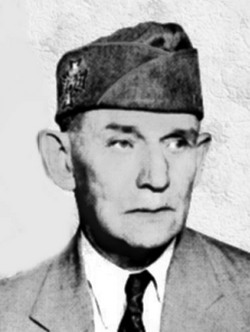
Private Alfred Polond MOH Spanish–American War

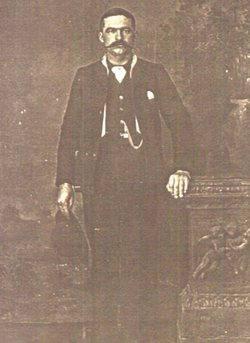
Sergeant Andrew J Cummins MOH Spanish–American War

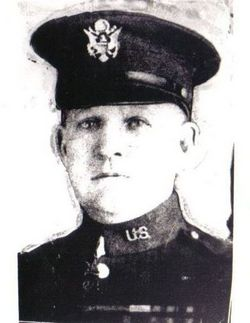
Private William G. Kellyer MOH Spanish–American War

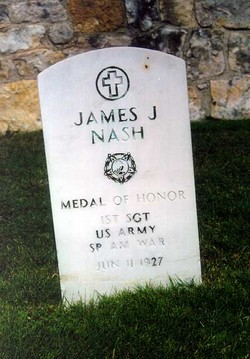
Gravestone of Private James J. Nash MOH Spanish–American War

== Image gallery ==
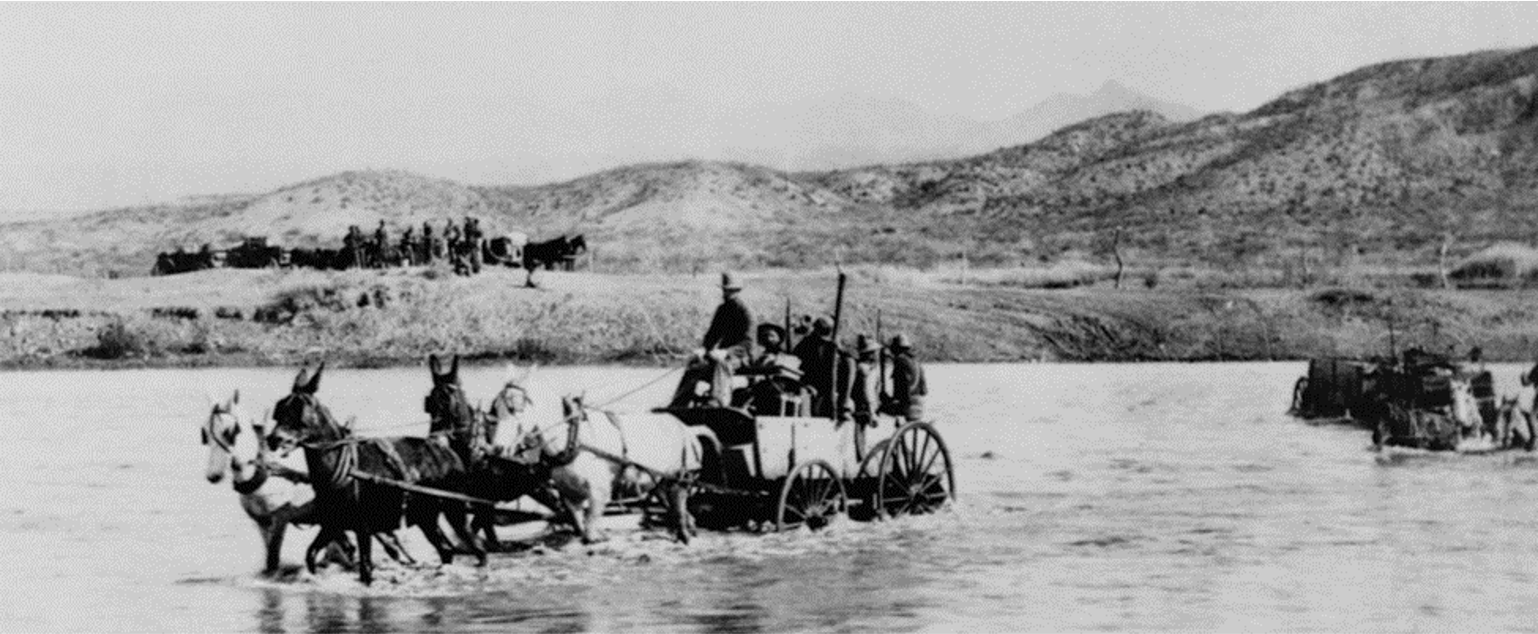
Crossing the Gila River during frontier duty.

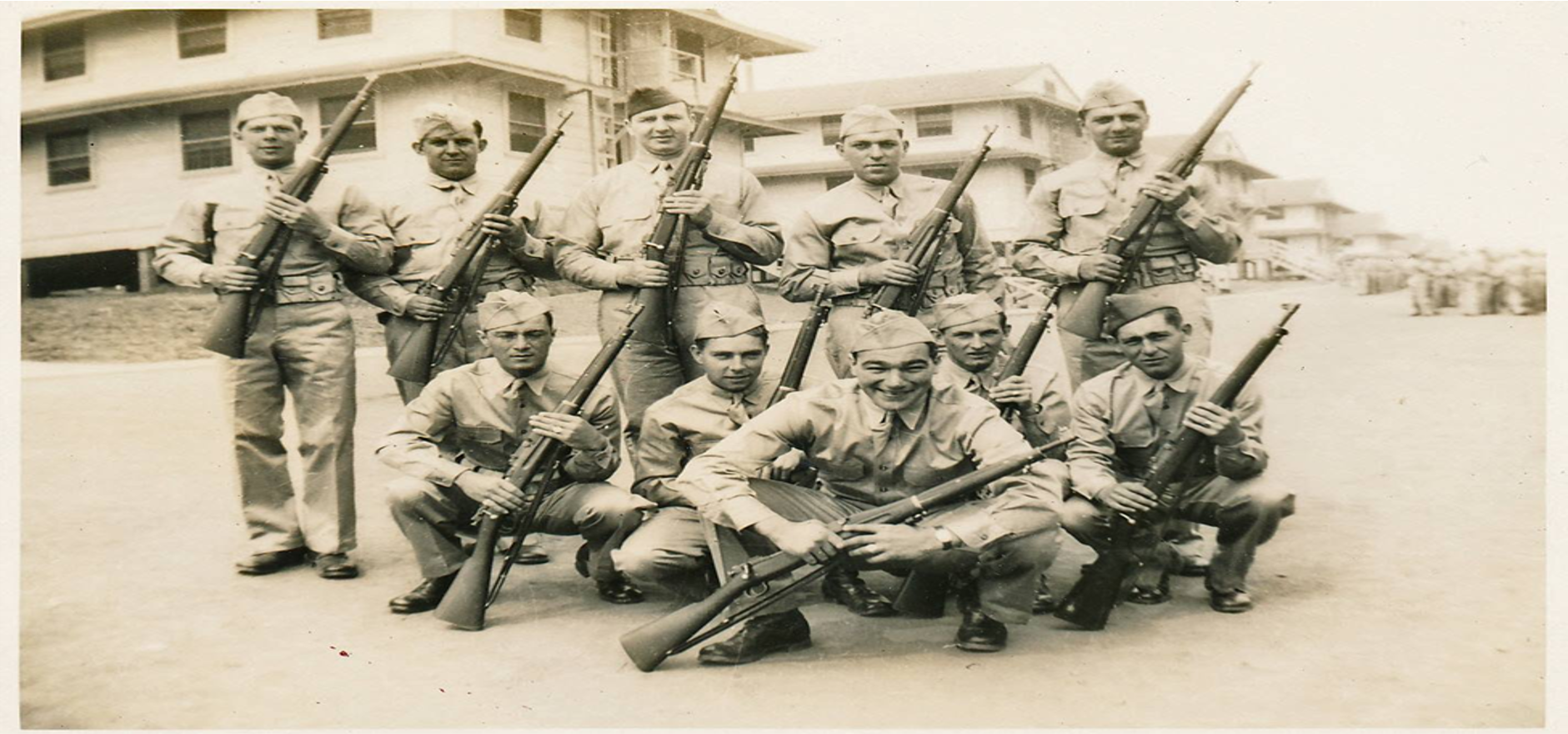
Training at Camp Croft during WWII

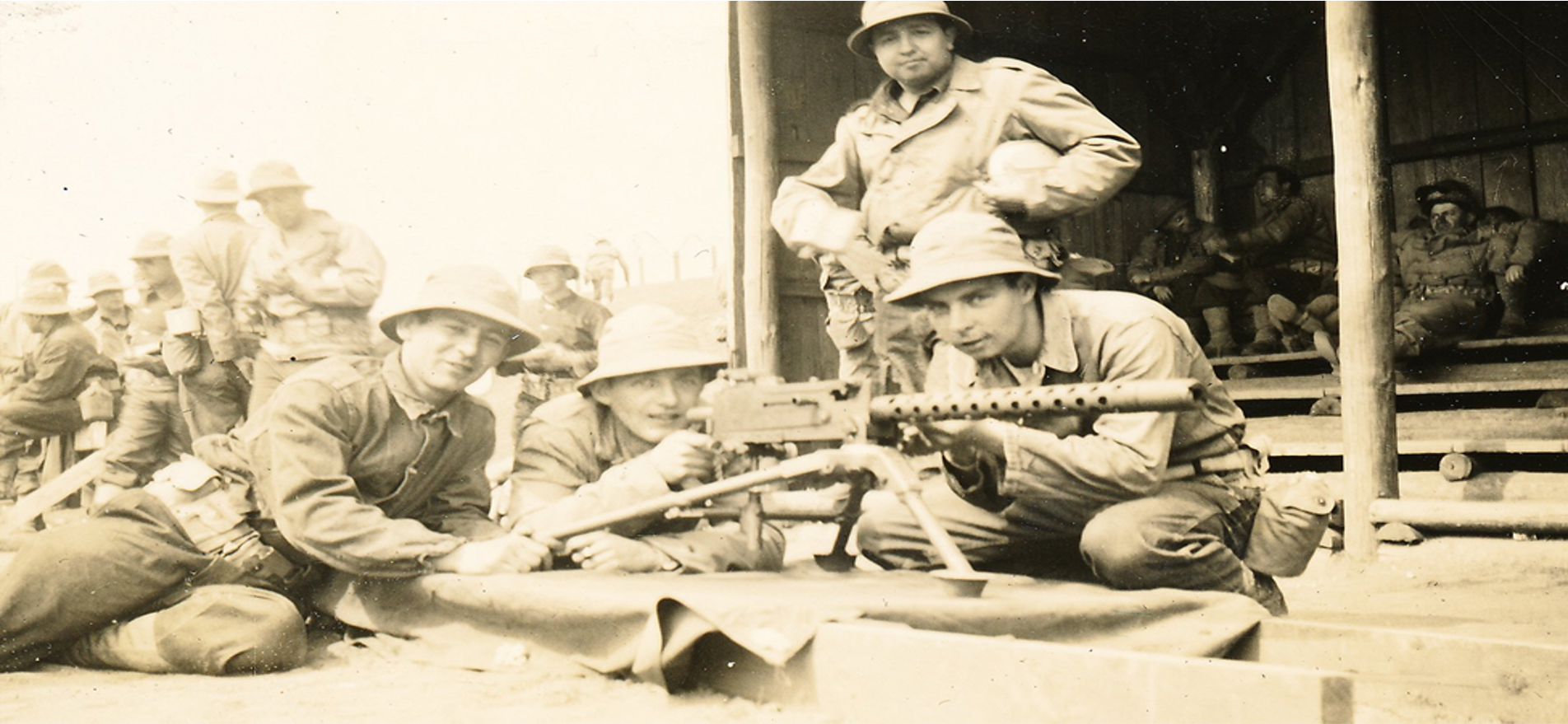
Machine gun training at Camp Croft

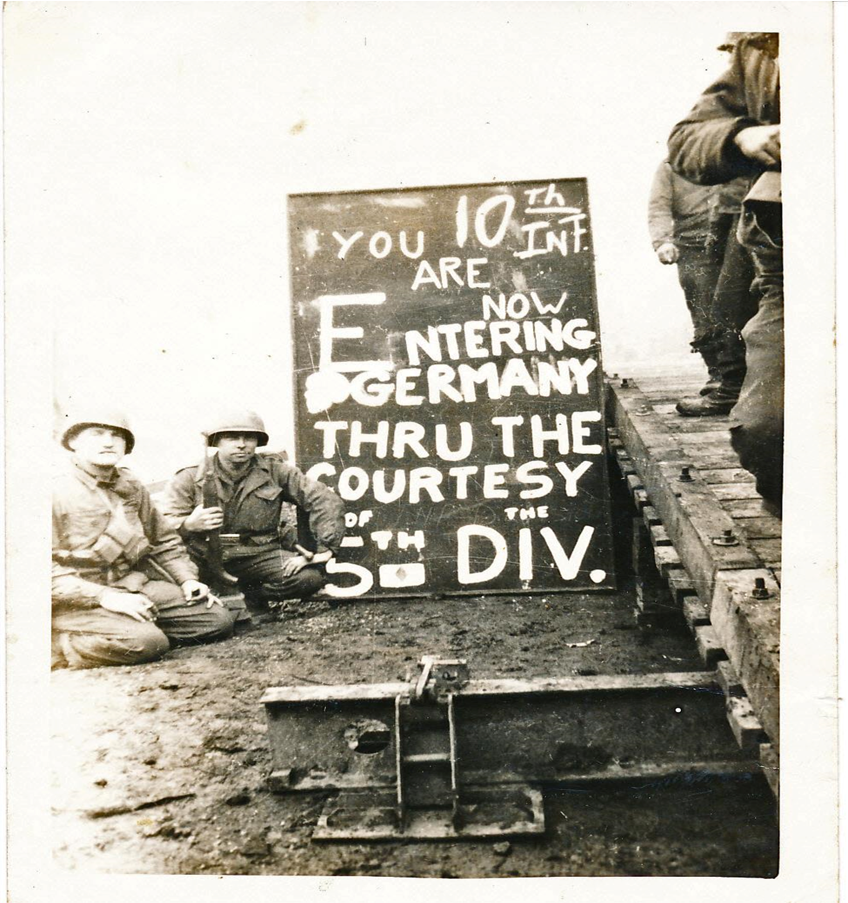
10th Infantry at security point in Germany

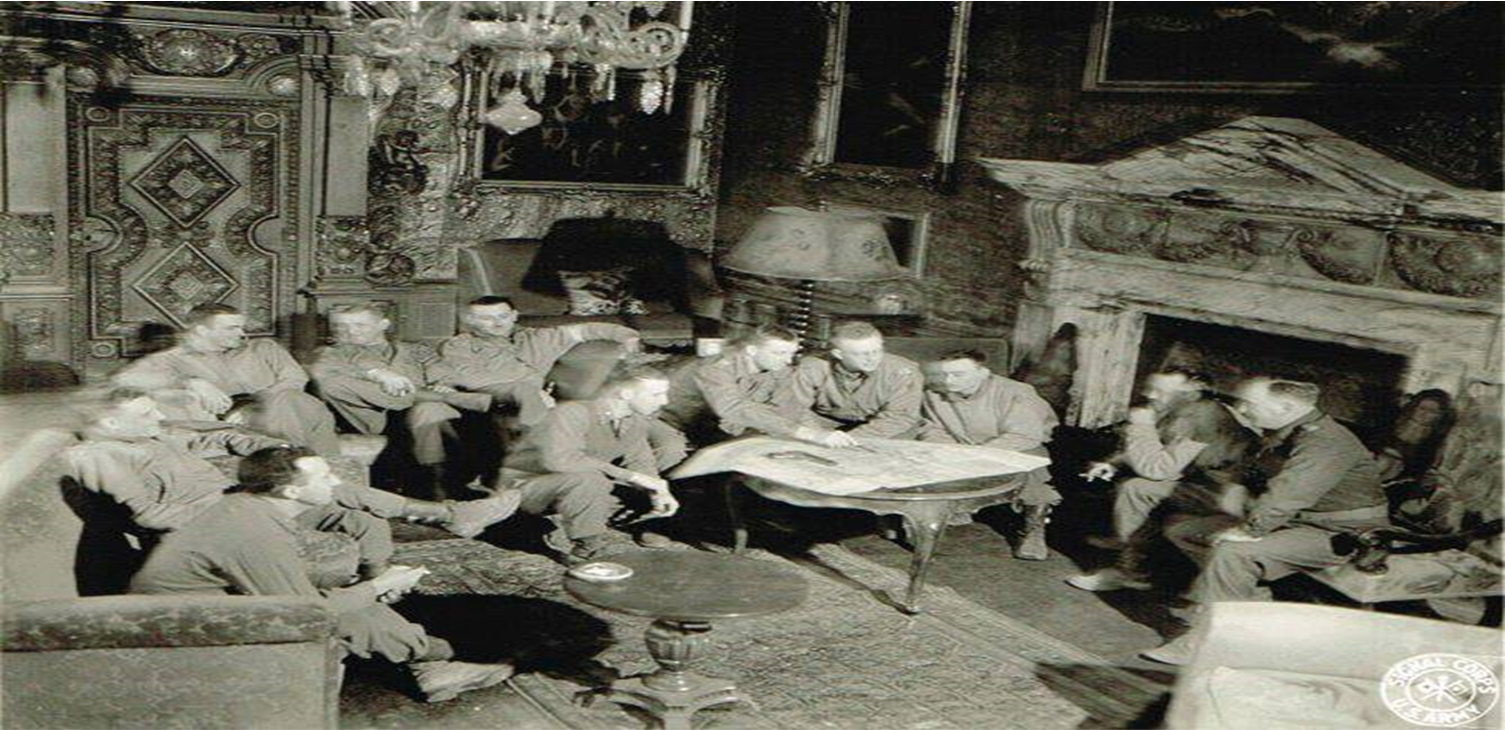
Officers of the 10th meeting in seized German stronghold

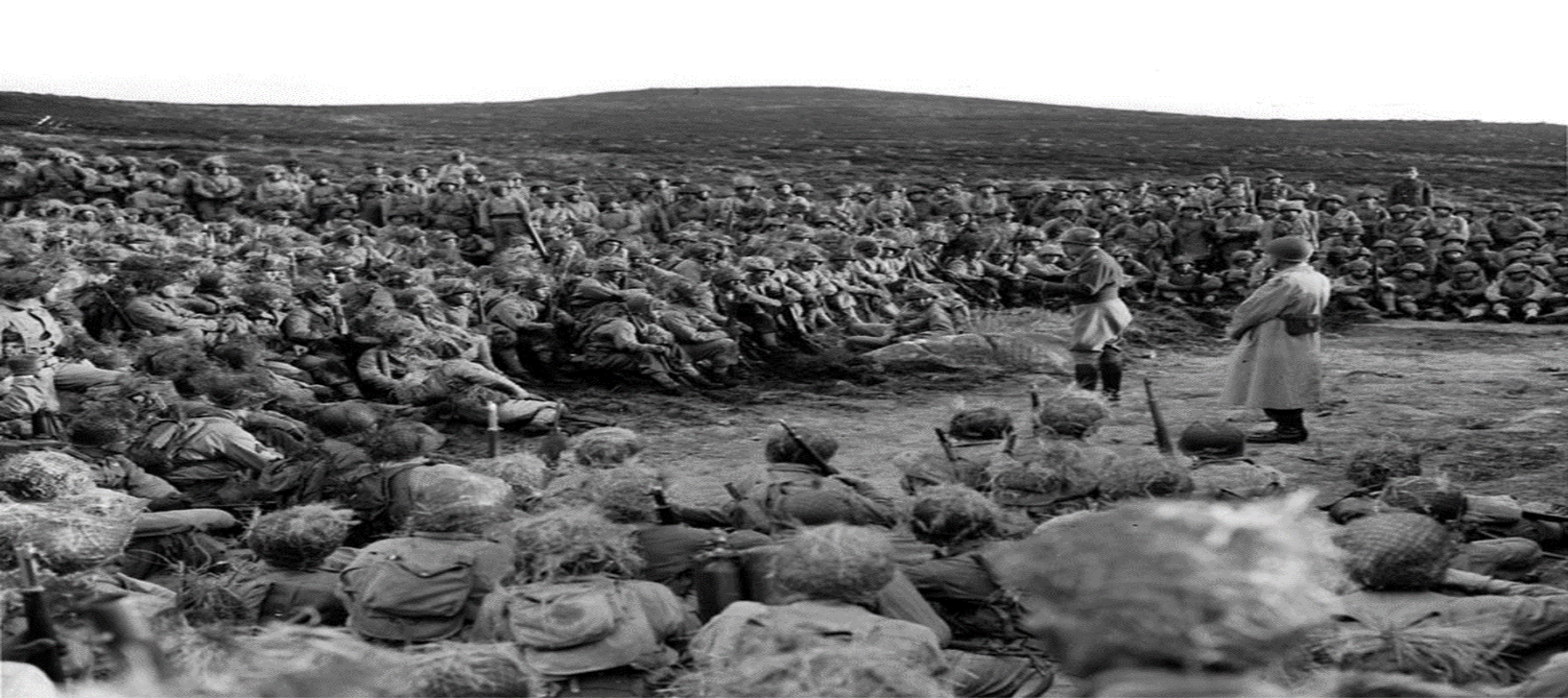
Address by then Lieutenant General George Patton in Northern Ireland on 30 March 1944 in preparation for the invasion of Normandy.

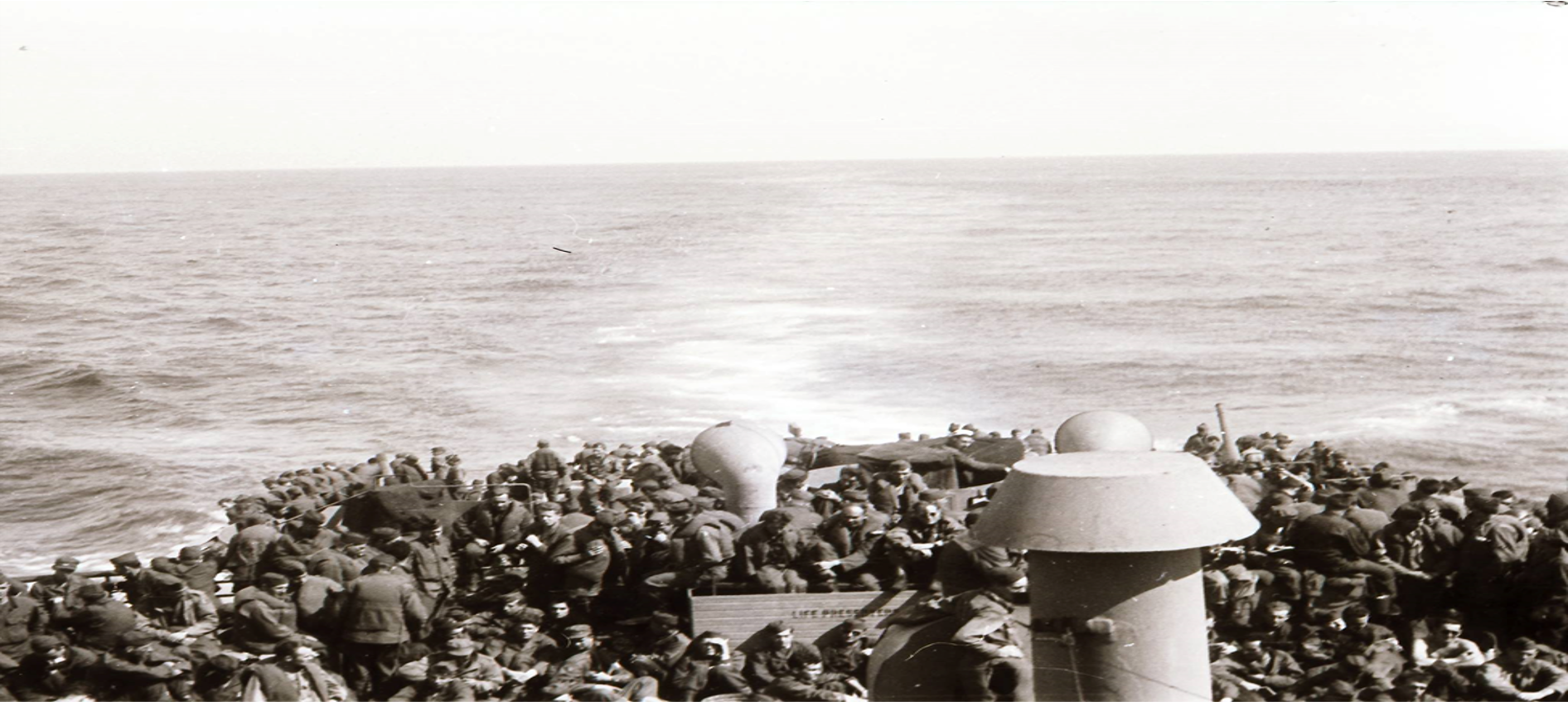
10th Infantry return voyage back to the United States.

== See also ==
- List of United States Regular Army Civil War units

== Notes ==
- army.mil
