= German submarine U-153 =

U-153 may refer to one of the following German submarines:

- SM U-153, a Type U 151 submarine launched in 1917 and that served in World War I until surrendered on 24 November 1918; scuttled off the Isle of Wight on 30 June 1921
  - During the First World War, Germany also had this submarine with a similar name:
    - SM UB-153, a Type UB III submarine laid down but unfinished at the end of the war; broken up incomplete in 1919
- German submarine U-153 (1941), a Type IXC submarine that served in World War II until sunk on 13 July 1942
