= Fidelitas =

Fidelitas (Latin, 'fidelity, faithfulness') may refer to:

- Fidelitas (Hungary), the youth organization of the conservative Fidesz party
- Fidélitas University, a private university in Costa Rica
- FC Fidelitas Karlsruhe, an early German football club
- SS Fidelitas, an Italian World War II steamer
