= M107 =

M107 most often refers to:

- XM107/M107 Barrett rifle, a semi-automatic .50 caliber rifle
- M107 (projectile), a 155 mm projectile used by the United States Army
- M107 self-propelled gun, an American 175 mm self-propelled gun

M107 may also refer to:

== Military ==
- German minesweeper M 107
- HMS Pembroke (M107), a British Royal Navy minehunter
- M107 bomb; see M47 bomb

== Other uses ==
- M-107 (Michigan highway), a former state highway in Michigan
- M107 (New York City bus), a bus route in Manhattan, New York City
- Irem M-107, an arcade system board
- Messier 107, a globular cluster in the constellation Ophiuchus
- the initial designation of the Soviet Klimov VK-107 aircraft engine
