= German submarine Deutschland =

Unarmed cargo submarine during WWI

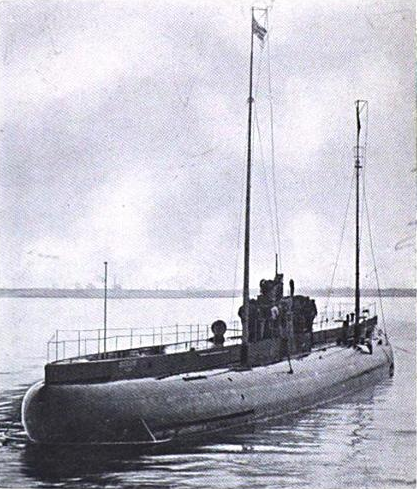

History

German Empire
- Name: Deutschland
- Port of registry: Bremen
- Ordered: 27 October 1915
- Builder: Flensburger Schiffbau
- Yard number: 382
- Launched: 28 March 1916
- Fate: Converted into U-155

German Empire
- Name: U-155
- Commissioned: 19 February 1917
- Fate: Surrendered 24 November 1918; used as exhibition vessel; broken up at Rock Ferry in 1922.

General characteristics
- Class & type: Type U 151 submarine
- Displacement: 1,512 t (1,488 long tons) (surfaced); 1,875 t (1,845 long tons) (submerged); 2,272 t (2,236 long tons) (total)
- Length: 65 m (213 ft 3 in) (o/a); 57 m (187 ft) (pressure hull)
- Beam: 8.90 m (29 ft 2 in) (o/a); 5.80 m (19 ft 0 in) (pressure hull)
- Height: 9.25 m (30 ft 4 in)
- Draught: 5.30 m (17 ft 5 in)
- Installed power: 800 PS (590 kW; 790 bhp) (surfaced); 800 PS (590 kW; 790 bhp) (submerged)
- Propulsion: 2 × shafts, 2 × 1.60 m (5 ft 3 in) propellers
- Speed: 12.4 knots (23.0 km/h; 14.3 mph) surfaced; 5.2 knots (9.6 km/h; 6.0 mph) submerged
- Range: 25,000 nmi (46,000 km; 29,000 mi) at 5.5 knots (10.2 km/h; 6.3 mph) surfaced, 65 nmi (120 km; 75 mi) at 3 knots (5.6 km/h; 3.5 mph) submerged
- Test depth: 50 metres (160 ft)
- Complement: 6 officers, 50 enlisted
- Armament: 6 × 50 cm (20 in) torpedo tubes; 18 torpedoes; 2 × 15 cm (5.9 in) SK L/40 deck guns with 1,688 rounds

Service record
- Part of: U-Kreuzer Flotilla; 19 February 1917 – 14 November 1918
- Commanders: Kptlt. Karl Meusel; 19 February – 5 September 1917; K.Kapt. Erich Eckelmann; 6 September 1917 – 31 May 1918; K.Kapt. Ferdinand Studt; 1 June – 14 November 1918
- Operations: 3 patrols
- Victories: 43 merchant ships sunk (120,434 GRT); 3 merchant ships damaged (9,080 GRT)

Deutschland was a blockade-breaking German merchant submarine used during World War I. It was developed with private funds and operated by the North German Lloyd Line. She was the first of seven U-151-class U-boats built and one of only two used as unarmed cargo submarines.

After making two voyages as an unarmed merchantman, she was taken over by the German Imperial Navy on 19 February 1917 and converted into U-155, armed with six torpedo tubes and two deck guns. As U-155, she began a raiding career in June 1917 that was to last until October 1918, sinking 120,434 GRT of shipping and damaging a further 9,080 GRT of shipping.

== Construction ==
Deutschland was one of seven submarines designed to carry cargo between the United States and Germany, through the naval blockade of the Entente Powers. Mainly enforced by Great Britain's Royal Navy, the blockade had led to great difficulties for German companies in acquiring raw materials which could not be found in quantity within the German sphere of influence, and thus substantially hindered the German war effort.

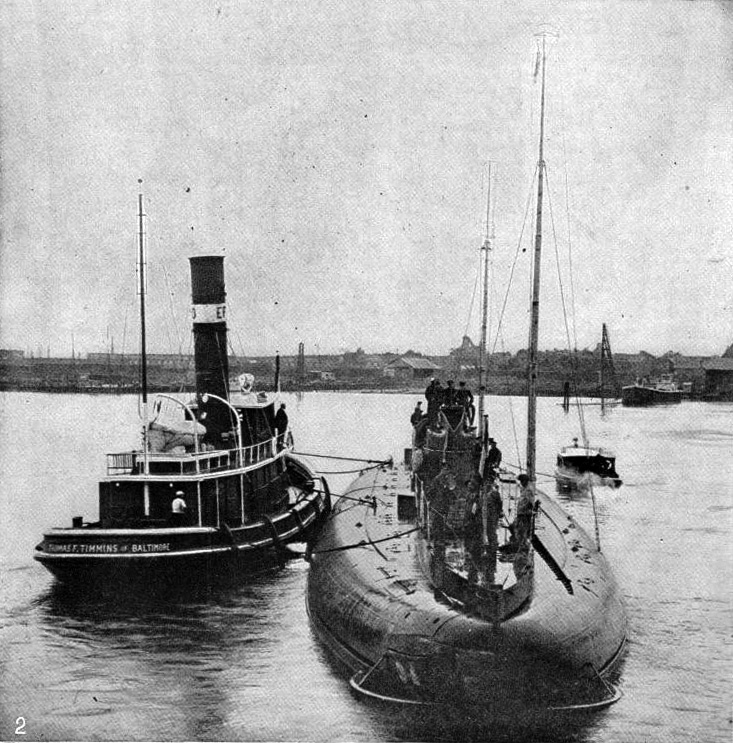
U-Deutschland at Port of Baltimore, Maryland 10 July 1916, in an image from the New International Encyclopedia

Deutschland was built together with her sister ship Bremen in 1916 for the German Ocean Navigation, Deutsche Ozean-Reederei (DOR), a private shipping company created for the enterprise, a subsidiary company of the North German Lloyd shipping company (now Hapag-Lloyd) and the Deutsche Bank. She was constructed without armaments, with a wide beam to provide space for cargo. The cargo capacity was 700 tons (230 tons of rubber could be stored in the free-flooding spaces between the inner and outer hulls), relatively small compared to surface ships.

Britain and France soon protested against the use of submarines as merchant ships, arguing that they could not be stopped and inspected for munitions in the same manner as other cargo vessels. The US, under diplomatic pressure for supposedly showing favoritism while having declared itself neutral, rejected the argument. Even submarines, as long as they were unarmed, were to be regarded as merchant vessels and accordingly would be permitted to trade.

Only two submarines were completed according to the original design: Deutschland and Bremen, which was lost on its maiden voyage, also to the United States. Due to the United States' entry into the war, the other five submarine freighters were converted into long-range cruiser submarine (U-kreuzers), equipped with two 150mm deck guns and were known as the Type U 151 class.

== Merchant service ==
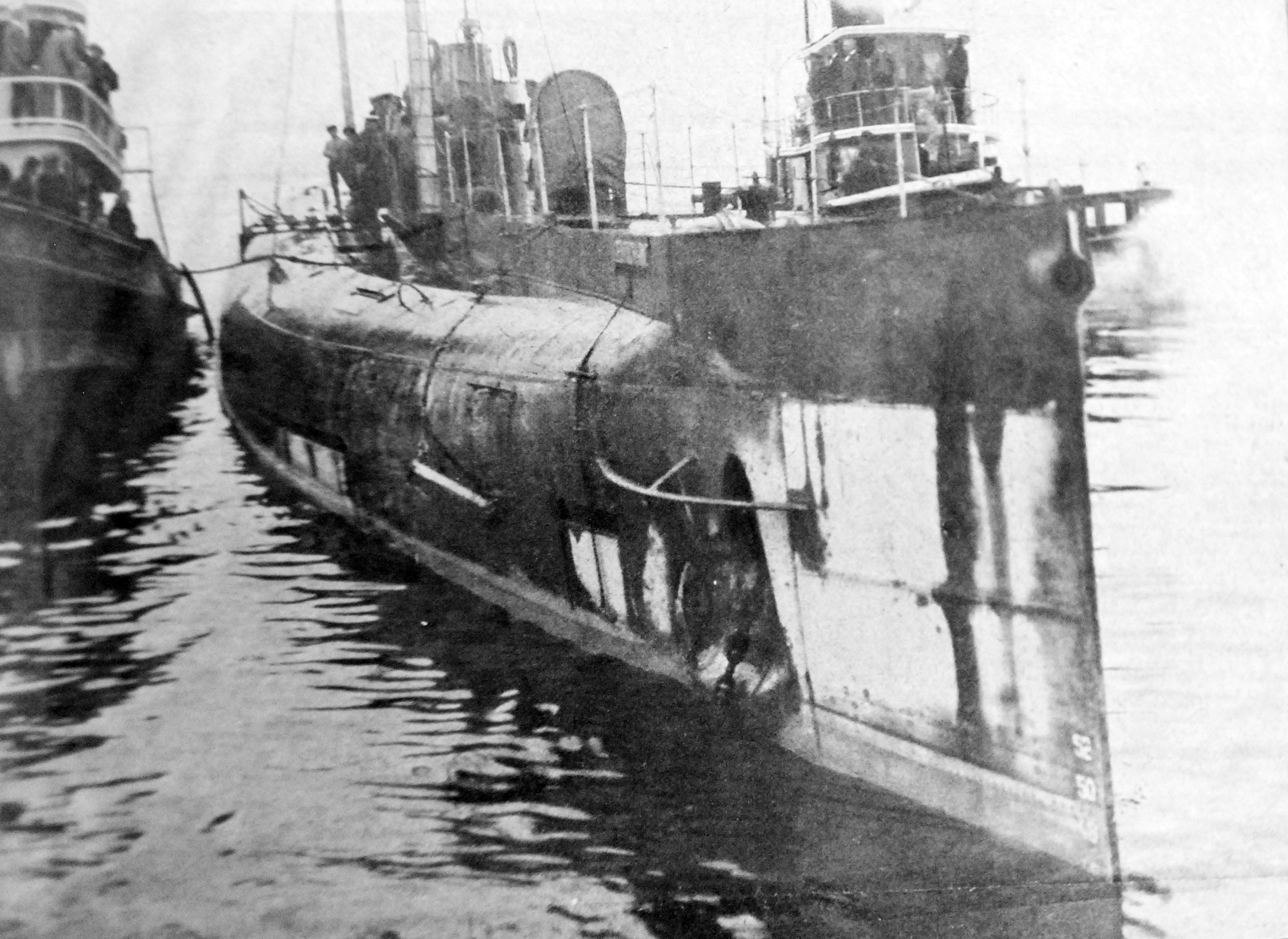

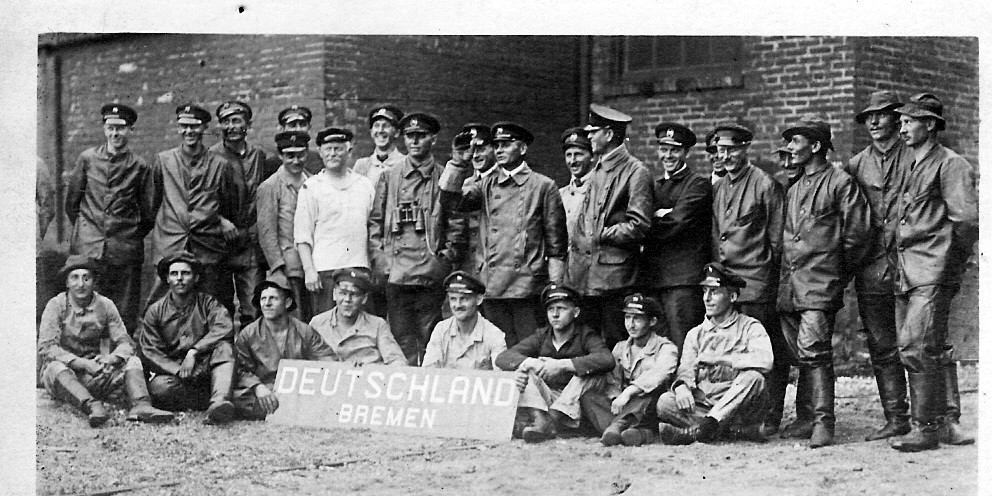
Deutschland and crew in Baltimore, 1916

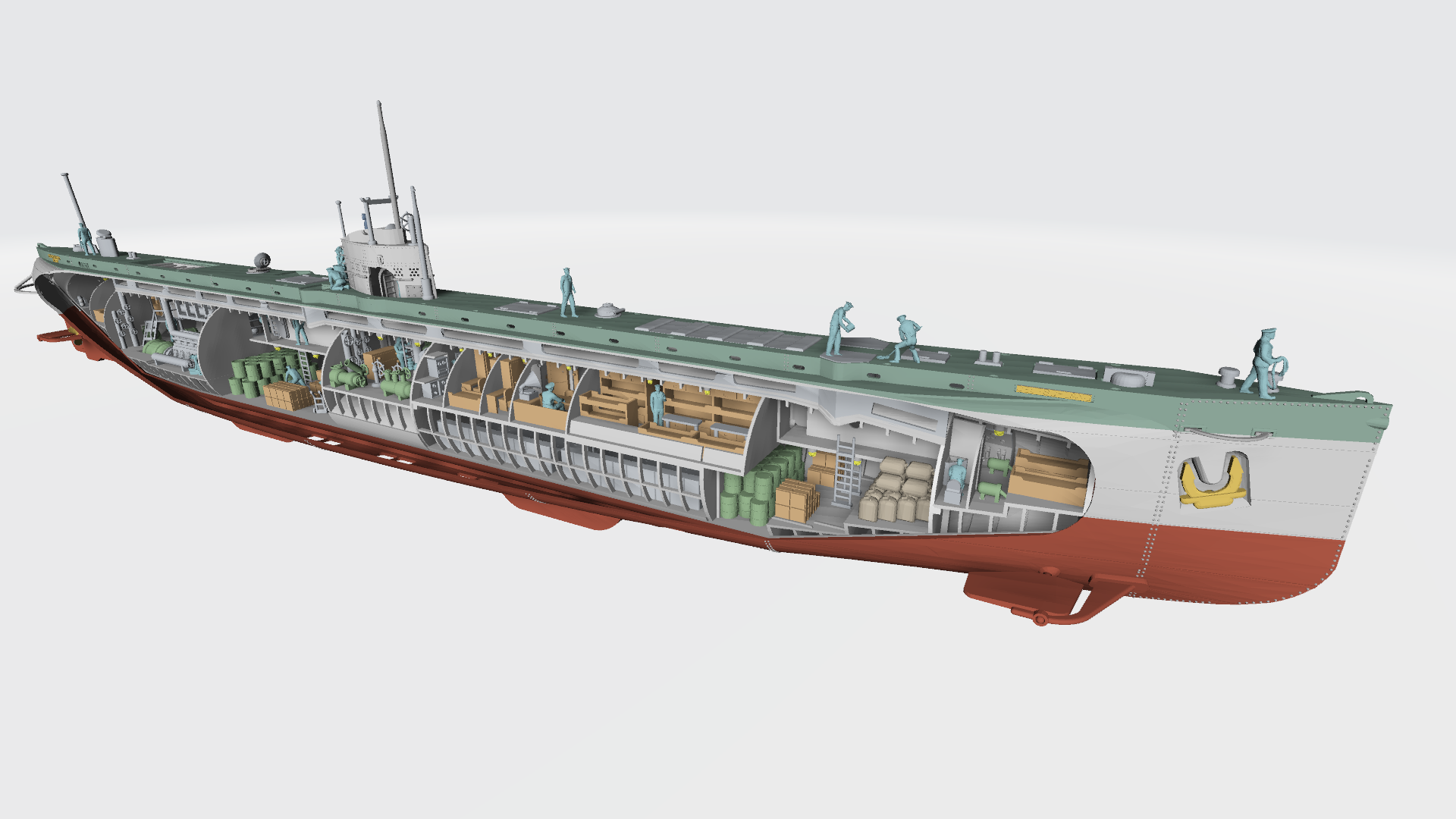
Deutschland 1916 3D view

=== First journey ===
Deutschland departed on her first voyage to the US on 23 June 1916 commanded by Paul König, formerly of the North German Lloyd company. On her maiden voyage, she carried 750 tons of cargo in total, including 125 tons of highly sought-after chemical dyes, mainly Anthraquinone and Alizarine derivatives in highly concentrated form, some of which were over $2,000 a pound in 2025 money. She also carried medical drugs, mainly Salvarsan, gemstones, and diplomatic mails, her cargo being worth $1.5 million in total ($44 million in 2025).

Deutschland waited a week at Heligoland after the announced sailing date to avoid enemy patrols. She submerged for only 90 miles (140 km) of the 3,800-mile (6,100 km) outbound voyage. Deutschland did not enter the English channel but took a northern passage around Scotland. At about 600 nmi (690 mi; 1,100 km) off the Virginia Capes lookouts sighted a possible hostile ship so that Deutschland submerged, altered course back to sea and then approached submerged until about 100 nmi (120 mi; 190 km) of the Chesapeake Bay entrance. At 1:20 a.m. on 9 July Cape Henry was sighted and contact made with the Eastern Forwarding Company tug Thomas Timmins which had been specially altered to tow Deutschland alongside and been waiting some days. (Note: The tug is most likely Thomas F. Timmins, O/N 201955, of Baltimore seen on page 175 of the U.S. register for 1916.) At 11:00 p.m. on 9 July 1916 the two vessels reached Baltimore. She arrived at the Quarantine anchorage off of Marley Neck, Anne Arundel county, just outside of what was then Baltimore city limits. after just over two weeks at sea. A photograph by Karle Netzer was made the next morning, 10 July. (erreichte Baltimore Hafen 10 Juli 1916). During their stay in Baltimore, the German crewmen were welcomed as celebrities for their astonishing journey and even taken to fancy dinners and an impromptu volksfest in the southwest part of the city. American submarine pioneer Simon Lake visited Deutschland while she was in Baltimore, and made an agreement with representatives of the North German Lloyd line to build cargo submarines in the US, a project which never came to fruition when the United States declared war on Germany in early April, 1917.

She stayed at Baltimore until 2 August, when she sailed for Bremerhaven, arriving on 24 August with a cargo of 341 tons of nickel, 93 tons of tin, and 348 tons of crude rubber (257 tons of which were carried outside the pressure hull). Her cargo was valued at $17.5 million, several times the submarine's construction costs. She had traveled 8,450 nmi (15,650 km; 9,720 mi), having been submerged for 190 nmi (350 km; 220 mi) of them.

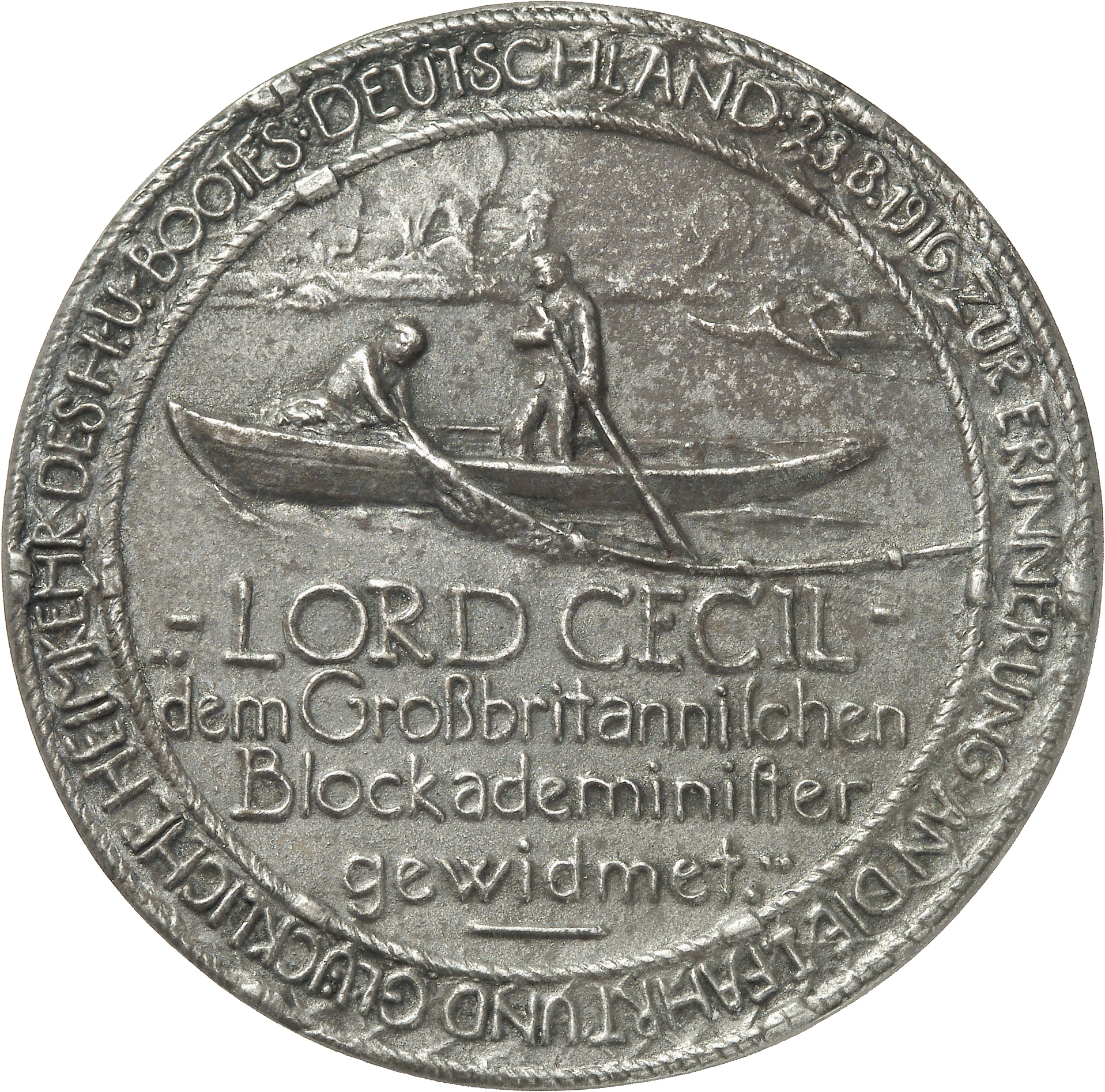
Medallion commemorating the successful first journey, August 1916

The successful completion of this first voyage was commemorated with a tongue-in-cheek medal created by German artist Ernst Zehle, with a dedication to the British Lord Robert Cecil, responsible for the blockade, on the front. On the reverse is a beaver swimming under some fishermen's nets with the phrase "Don't go over! Go under!"

=== Second journey ===
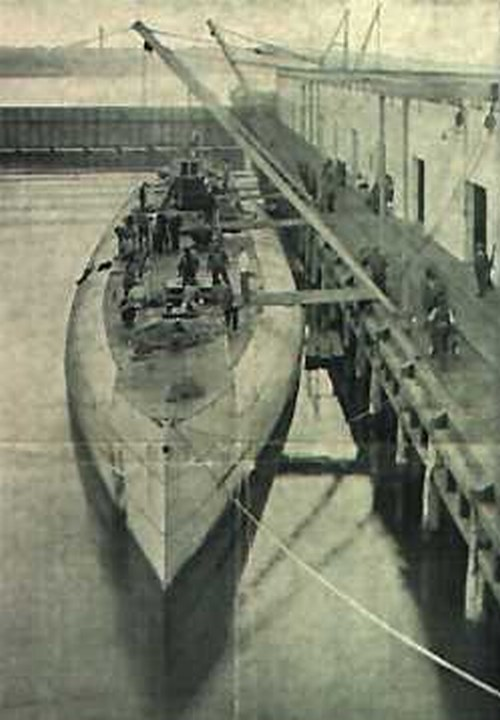
Deutschland unloading in New London, 1916

Deutschland made a second round trip in November 1916. This time she went to New London, Connecticut, where the Norddeutscher Lloyd ship Willehad was waiting as her submarine tender. Deutschland discharged $10 million of cargo ($296,000,000 in 2025) including gems, securities, and medicinal products. At the same time the submarine U-53 also crossed the Atlantic to visit Newport, Rhode Island, and sank five Allied cargo ships just outside US territorial limits before returning home.

On 17 November as she was putting to sea, Deutschland accidentally rammed the tugboat T. A. Scott, Jr., which turned across her path suddenly while escorting her from New London to the open ocean. T. A. Scott, Jr., sank immediately with the loss of her entire crew of five. Deutschland's bow was damaged, and she had to return to New London for repairs, which delayed her departure by a week. She finally left New London on 21 November 1916, with a cargo that included 6.5 tons of silver bullion.

Following his last voyage, Captain Paul König collaborated to write a book about the journeys of Deutschland, entitled Voyage of the Deutschland, the First Merchant Submarine (Verlag Ullstein & Co, Berlin 1916, and, Hearst International Library Co., New York 1916). The book was heavily publicized, as it was intended to sway public opinion in both Germany and the US.

== War service ==
A third voyage, planned for January 1917, was aborted as German-US relations had worsened following the sinking of shipping bound for the United Kingdom, often just outside US territorial waters. Deutschland was taken over by the German Imperial Navy on 19 February 1917 and converted into U-155, part of the U-Kreuzer Flotilla, being fitted with 6 bow torpedo tubes with 18 torpedoes, and two 15 cm SK L/40 naval gun taken from the pre-dreadnought battleship SMS Zähringen. She made three successful war cruises, sinking 43 ships and damaging three.

=== 1917 ===
During the summer of 1917 U-155 made a 105-day cruise, commanded by Kptlt. Karl Meusel, leaving Germany around 24 May and returning on 4 September. During her traverse of the Northern Passage around the northern end of the British Isles and out into the Atlantic Ocean, she was stalked and nearly sunk by U-19 near Utsira Island, Norway.

During this patrol, the boat fired on the port city of Ponta Delgada in the Azore Islands on 4 July at 3 a.m. with its deck guns. Portuguese army units did not respond due to being equipped with obsolete artillery. The collier USS Orion happened to be in port at the time undergoing repairs. Its company returned U-155's fire and dueled with the German boat for about 12 minutes. U-155 submerged without being hit and eventually retired. While the raid was light in damage (it killed four people), it alarmed Allied naval authorities about the defenseless nature of the Azores and their possible use as a base by boats like U-155 in the future. Allied naval forces, led by the U.S. Navy, began to send ships and establish a naval operating base in Ponta Delgada as a result.

During her patrol she sank 19 merchant ships, most by either scuttling or gunfire. She attacked 19 Allied armed merchantmen but only succeeded in sinking 9 of them. Upon her return to Germany she had covered a distance of 10,220 nmi (18,930 km; 11,760 mi), of which 620 nmi (1,150 km; 710 mi) had been travelled submerged, one of the longest voyages made by a U-boat during World War I.

=== 1918 ===
U-155 sailed from Kiel on 11 August 1918 commanded by Ferdinand Studt. Studt's orders directed him to cruise off the US coast in the region of the Nantucket lightship and lay mines off St. John's, Newfoundland and Halifax, Nova Scotia. He was also directed to cut telegraph cables off Sable Island, 80 km (50 mi) southeast of Nova Scotia. His orders, however, proved problematic, and Studt came to believe that the St. Johns where he was to lay mines was actually Saint John, New Brunswick, in the Bay of Fundy.

On U-155's outbound voyage she had captured and scuttled the Portuguese sailing ship Gamo, had attempted an attack on SS France, and destroyed by gunfire the Norwegian Stortind. On 7 September U-155 found herself in a long range gun duel with the US steamer Frank H. Buck, with the steamer later claiming to have sunk U-155.

On 13 September U-155 engaged in another gun fight with the British merchantman Newby Hall, which managed to damage the submarine, denting her armour and causing serious leaks in her pressure hull which made diving temporarily impossible.

On 19 September, Studt tried and failed to locate and cut the telegraph cable near Sable Island, then headed for Nantucket.

== Fate ==
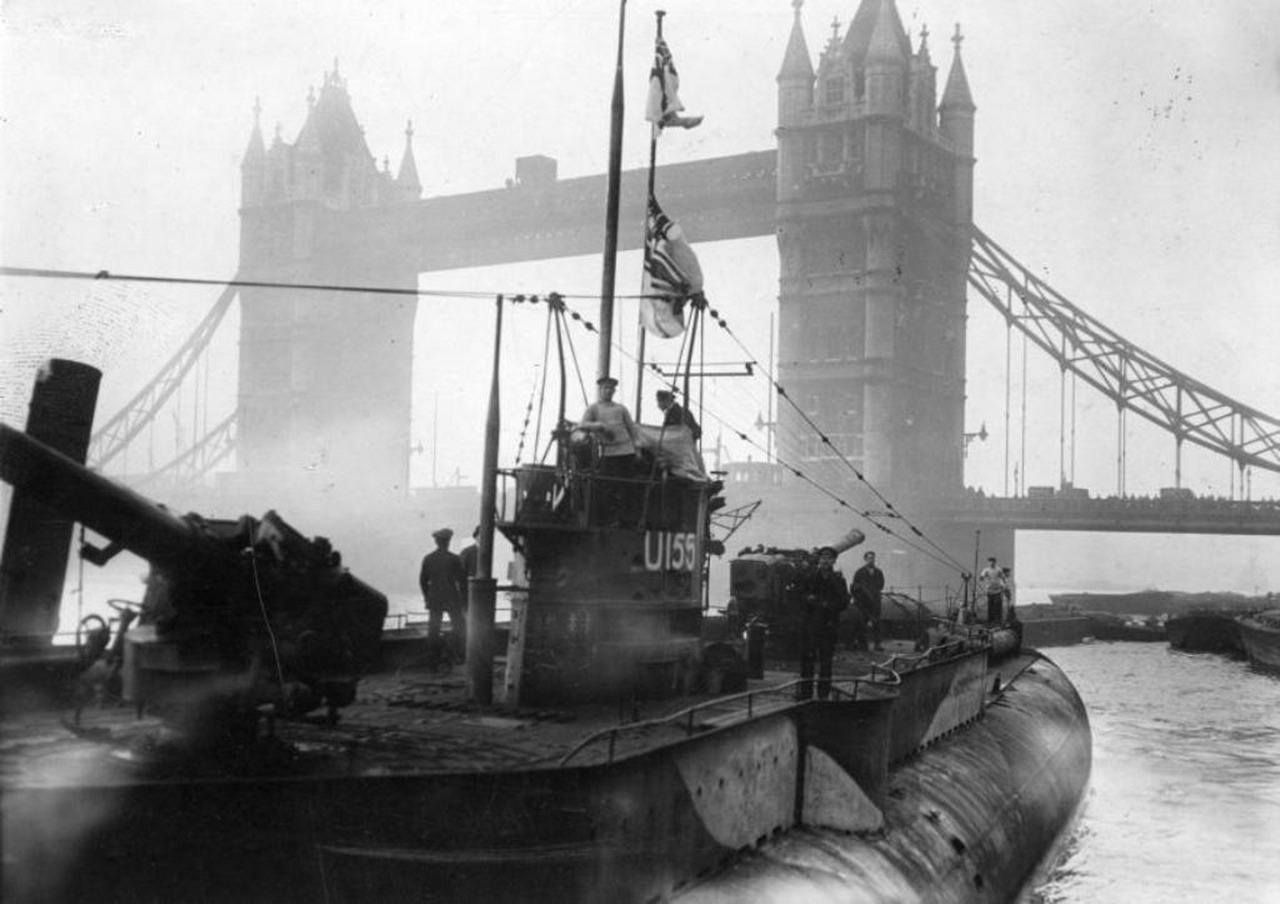
U-155 in London after World War I

U-155 returned to Germany from her final cruise on 12 November 1918 and was surrendered to the Allies at Harwich 24 November 1918 with other submarines as part of the terms of the Armistice. She was exhibited at St Katharine's Dock, London, in December 1918, and then at Liverpool, before being laid up at Rosyth. There, she was sold on 3 March 1919 to James Dredging Co. for £3,500, and then rapidly sold-on to Noel Pemberton Billing for £17,000, and then to John Bull Ltd (£15,000), a vehicle for Horatio Bottomley, who demilitarised the boat and embarked on a commercial tour that began at Great Yarmouth in September 1919, with the vessel re-christened Deutschland. At the end of the tour, in June 1921 she was taken into dock for stripping at Clover, Clayton Birkenhead, where, on 17 September 1921, an explosion in the engine room killed five apprentices. The hulk was sold to Robert Smith & Son, Birkenhead, for £200 in June 1922, and broken up at Rock Ferry.

== Summary of raiding history ==
Date	Name	Nationality	Tonnage (Note: Tonnages are in gross register tons)	Fate
2 June 1917	Hafursfjord	Norway	1,669	Sunk
10 June 1917	Scottish Hero	Canada	2,205	Sunk
14 June 1917	Aysgarth	United Kingdom	3,118	Sunk
30 June 1917	Benguela	Norway	4,612	Sunk
30 June 1917	Siraa	Norway	1,938	Sunk
7 July 1917	Coblenz	United Kingdom	1,338	Damaged
8 July 1917	Ruelle	France	3,583	Sunk
12 July 1917	Calliope	United Kingdom	2,883	Sunk
14 July 1917	Chalkydon	Greece	2,870	Sunk
18 July 1917	Ellen	Norway	3,877	Sunk
20 July 1917	Hanseat	Norway	3,358	Sunk
21 July 1917	Doris	Kingdom of Italy	1,355	Sunk
21 July 1917	John Twohy	United States	1,019	Sunk
21 July 1917	Willena Gertrude	United Kingdom	317	Sunk
31 July 1917	Madeleine	France	2,709	Sunk
31 July 1917	Snowdonian	United Kingdom	3,870	Sunk
1 August 1917	Alexandre	France	2,671	Sunk
2 August 1917	Marthe	France	3,119	Sunk
7 August 1917	Christiane	United States	964	Sunk
7 August 1917	Iran	United Kingdom	6,250	Sunk
16 February 1918	Tea	Kingdom of Italy	5,395	Sunk
18 February 1918	Cecil L. Shave	United Kingdom	102	Sunk
23 February 1918	Sardinero	Spain	2,170	Sunk
4 March 1918	Antioco Accame	Kingdom of Italy	4,439	Sunk
13 March 1918	Wegadesk	Norway	4,271	Sunk
15 March 1918	Joaquina	Spain	333	Damaged
18 March 1918	Prometeo	Kingdom of Italy	4,455	Sunk
18 March 1918	Reidar	Norway	3,574	Sunk
24 March 1918	Avala	Kingdom of Italy	3,834	Sunk
24 March 1918	Jorgina	United Kingdom	103	Sunk
25 March 1918	Rio Ave	Portugal	179	Sunk
27 March 1918	Watauga	United Kingdom	127	Sunk
1 April 1918	Lusitano	Portugal	529	Sunk
7 April 1918	Sterope	Kingdom of Italy	9,500	Sunk
13 April 1918	Harewood	United Kingdom	4,150	Sunk
16 April 1918	Nirpura	United Kingdom	7,640	Sunk
23 April 1918	Frances	United Kingdom	54	Sunk
31 August 1918	Gamo	Portugal	343	Sunk
2 September 1918	Stortind	Norway	2,510	Sunk
7 September 1918	Sophia	Portugal	162	Sunk
12 September 1918	Leixoes	Portugal	3,245	Sunk
20 September 1918	Kingfisher	United States	353	Sunk
3 October 1918	Alberto Treves	Kingdom of Italy	3,838	Sunk
4 October 1918	Industrial	United Kingdom	330	Sunk
12 October 1918	Amphion	United States	7,409	Damaged
17 October 1918	Lucia	United States	6,744	Sunk

== See also ==
- Italian R-class submarine, World War II, Italian cargo submarines
- Italian submarine Barbarigo, World War II, Marcello-class submarine that was converted into a transport
- Italian submarine Luigi Torelli, World War II, Marcello-class submarine that was converted into a transport
- Submarine Cargo Vessel, modern Russian cargo submarine proposal

== Bibliography ==
- Duncan, Francis (April 1965). "Deutschland – Merchant Submarine". Proceedings. Annapolis: United States Naval Institute: 68–75.
- Gibson, R.H.; Prendergast, Maurice (2002). The German Submarine War 1914–1918. Periscope Publishing Ltd. ISBN 1-904381-08-1.
- Gröner, Erich; Jung, Dieter; Maass, Martin (1991). U-boats and Mine Warfare Vessels. German Warships 1815–1945. Vol. 2. Translated by Thomas, Keith; Magowan, Rachel. London: Conway Maritime Press. ISBN 0-85177-593-4.
- Jung, Dieter (2004). Die Schiffe der Kaiserlichen Marine 1914-1918 und ihr Verbleib [German Imperial Navy ships 1914-1918 and their fate] (in German). Bonn: Bernard & Graefe. ISBN 3-7637-6247-7.
- König, Paul (2001). Voyage of the Deutschland, the First Merchant Submarine. US Naval Institute Press. ISBN 1-55750-424-5.
- König, Paul (1916). Voyage of the Deutschland, the First Merchant Submarine. Hearst's International Library.
