= R-class submarine =

R-class submarine may refer to:

- British R-class submarine, a class of 12 small British diesel-electric submarines built for the Royal Navy during World War I
- Italian R-class submarine, a group of submarines built for the Italian Royal Navy (Regia Marina Italiana) during World War II
- Rainbow-class submarine, a Royal Navy World War II submarine
- United States R-class submarine, a class of United States Navy submarines active from 1918 until 1945
