= Paul König =

German sailor and business executive

Paul Liebrecht König
- Paul König.
- Born: March 20, 1867; Rohr, Province of Saxony, Kingdom of Prussia
- Died: September 9, 1933 (aged 66); Gnadau, Province of Saxony, Free State of Prussia, Nazi Germany
- Military career
- Allegiance: German Empire
- Branch: Imperial German Navy
- Rank: Kapitänleutnant
- Commands: German submarine Deutschland, 1916 – 1917
- Conflicts: U-boat Campaign (World War I)
- Awards: Iron Cross 1st class

Paul Liebrecht König (March 20, 1867 – September 9, 1933) was a sailor and business executive. The son of a clergyman, married to an English wife from whom he separated for the duration of the war, he is most known for two visits he made to the United States in 1916 as captain of the merchant submarine U-Deutschland.

König was a captain in the German merchant navy. In 1916 during World War I, he became a reserve Kapitänleutnant in the Imperial German Navy.

Later in 1916, König became commanding officer of the merchant submarine Deutschland. He took it on two voyages to the United States for commercial purposes. He arrived at Baltimore on the night of July 9, 1916 having been towed by the tug Thomas Timminns from the Virginia Capes. The cargo was dyestuffs. While in the United States he was interviewed by newspapermen, was even the recipient of vaudeville offers, was welcomed by mayor of Baltimore and officials. On August 2 he sailed on the return voyage, later making a second voyage and putting in at New London, Connecticut.

He received the Iron Cross 1st class the same year. Following his return after the second journey, König wrote a book called Voyage of the Deutschland, which was heavily publicized, as it was intended to be used as propaganda.

König then became commanding officer of a Sperrbrechergruppe (group of blockade runners; 1917), and later was an executive at Norddeutscher Lloyd (1919–1931). He died at Gnadau, on September 9, 1933, where he is buried.

== Awards and decorations ==
- Iron Cross, 2nd class (1915 ) and 1st class (1916)
- Hohenzollern House Order (1916)
- Honorary Doctorate from the University of Halle (Saale), Dr.med.hc (1916)
