= German submarine Bremen =

German merchant submarine

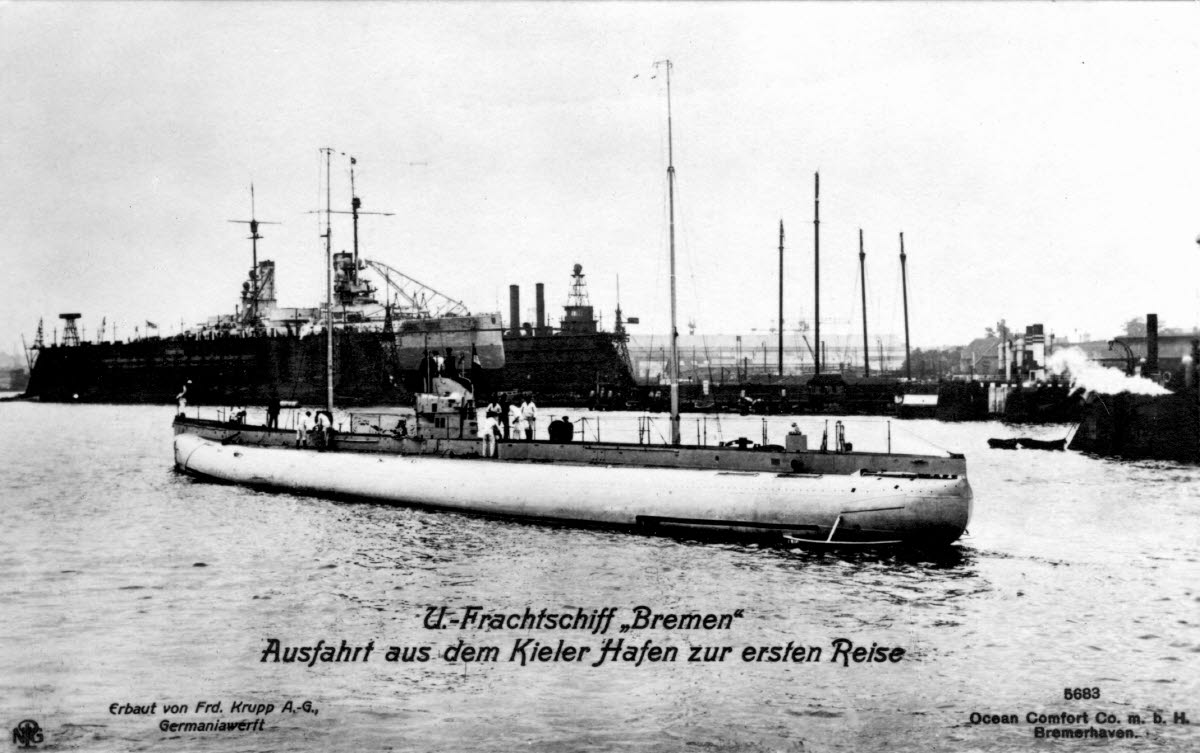
- Bremen in Kiel, 1916

History

German Empire
- Name: Bremen
- Builder: Flensburger Schiffbau
- Fate: Disappeared at sea, September 1916

General characteristics
- Class & type: German Type U 151 submarine
- Displacement: 2,272 t (2,236 long tons)
- Length: 65 m (213 ft 3 in) (o/a)
- Beam: 8.90 m (29 ft 2 in)
- Draught: 5.30 m (17 ft 5 in)
- Propulsion: 800 PS (588 kW; 789 bhp)
- Speed: Surfaced 10 knots (19 km/h; 12 mph); submerged 6.7 knots (12.4 km/h; 7.7 mph)
- Range: 12,000 nmi (22,000 km; 14,000 mi)
- Test depth: 50 m (160 ft)
- Capacity: 700 tons

Bremen was a blockade-breaking German merchant submarine of World War I. Developed with private funds and operated by the Norddeutscher Lloyd Line, she was one of the first of seven U-151-class U-boats built and one of only two used as unarmed cargo submarines.

== Construction ==
Bremen was built together with her sister ship Deutschland in 1916 for Deutsche Ozean-Reederei, a private shipping company created for the purpose, a subsidiary company of the North German Lloyd shipping company (now Hapag-Lloyd) and Deutsche Bank. She was constructed without armaments, with a wide beam to provide space for cargo. The cargo capacity was 700 tons (much of it outside the pressure hull), relatively small compared to surface ships.

Bremen was one of seven submarines designed to carry cargo between the United States and Germany in 1916, through the naval blockade of the Entente Powers. Mainly enforced by Great Britain's Royal Navy, the blockade had led to great difficulties for German companies in acquiring raw materials which could not be found in quantity within the German sphere of influence, and thus substantially hindered the German war effort.

Five of the submarine freighters were converted into long-range cruiser U-boats (U-kreuzers) equipped with two 10.5 cm (4.1 in) deck guns, and only two were completed according to the original design: Deutschland and Bremen.

== Maiden voyage and disappearance ==
Bremen departed Bremerhaven in September 1916 for Norfolk, Virginia, commanded by Kapitänleutnant Karl Schwartzkopf, and reportedly carrying financial credits for Simon Lake to begin building cargo submarines for Germany. She did not complete this voyage and her fate is a mystery. Several views have been put forth as to the nature of her fate.

German U-boat U-53 had been assigned to join Bremen as protection against British attacks but failed to make contact. Its commander Hans Rose reported having heard a radio broadcast on 28 September 1916 stating that Bremen had been sunk.

A life preserver marked "Bremen" was found in Maiden Cove at Cape Elizabeth, Maine, on September 29, 1916. The submarine had been expected to arrive on the Atlantic Seaboard for at least a week. Stamped on the canvas covering was Shutz-Marke, a small crown, and "V-Epping-Hoven, Willhelms-haven." Although in new condition and not long in the water, the life preserver was stained with oil.

One source records that a submarine believed to have been Bremen was sighted 300 nmi (560 km; 350 mi) south of Iceland on a course for Baltimore and units of 10th Cruiser Squadron were dispatched to intercept it; HMS Mantua reported ramming a heavy, submerged object. However, Mantua's log makes no mention of this, so it appears to be a myth.

Another source states that Bremen was sunk by British submarine HMS G13. In March 1917, G13 was on patrol off Shetland, covering the exit by U-boats from the North Sea. There she sighted a submarine identified as Bremen, and fired two torpedoes, which both missed. Turning, G13 fired again, first with her starboard beam, and continuing her turn with her port beam torpedoes; both these also missed. Then a final shot, with her stern tube, at a range of 7,000 yards (6,400 m), was rewarded with an explosion, and Bremen was believed sunk. The Admiralty, however, felt this was inconclusive, and withheld credit for the hit.

Yet another source regards her as lost, probably as a result of hitting a mine. In the absence of any firm evidence, the cause of Bremen's loss remains a mystery.
