= USS Orion (AC-11) =

Collier of the United States Navy

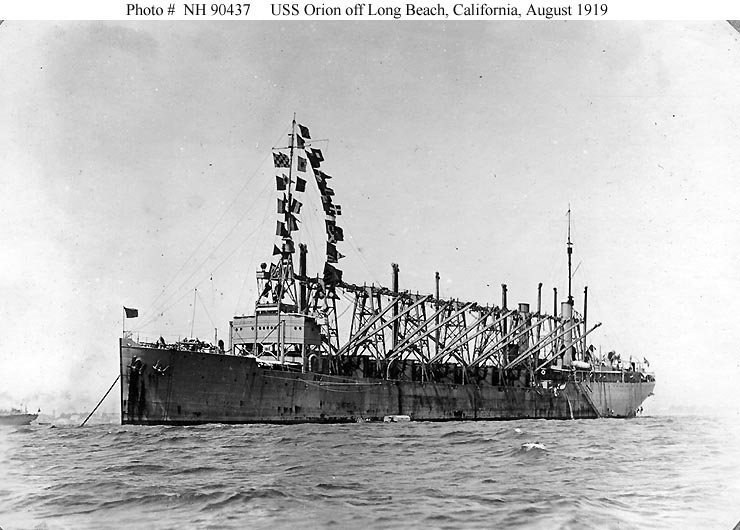

History

United States
- Name: USS Orion
- Builder: Maryland Steel Co., Sparrows Point, Maryland
- Laid down: 6 October 1911
- Launched: 23 March 1912
- Commissioned: 29 July 1912
- Decommissioned: 18 June 1926
- Stricken: 10 July 1931
- Fate: Sold, 30 August 1933

General characteristics
- Type: Collier
- Displacement: 19,132 long tons (19,439 t)
- Length: 536 ft (163 m)
- Beam: 65 ft (20 m)
- Draft: 27 ft 8 in (8.43 m)
- Speed: 14 kn (16 mph; 26 km/h)
- Complement: 179 officers and enlisted
- Armament: 4 × 3 in (76 mm) guns

USS Orion (AC–11) was a collier of the United States Navy. The ship was laid down by the Maryland Steel Co., Sparrows Point, Maryland, on 6 October 1911, launched on 23 March 1912, and commissioned at Norfolk on 29 July 1912.

== Construction and design ==
The ship's launch set a new world's record for rapid construction. The ship, and sister Jason, were built on the patented Isherwood System of longitudinal framing with propulsion machinery in the stern. Cargo space was provided by six large, self trimming, coal holds for 2,248 short tons (2,039,351 kg) of coal and four deep tanks forward under the lower deck combined with tanks in the inner bottom under the holds for 772,400 US gallons (2,923,852 L) of oil cargo. The coal holds had two hatches each, except for the one hatch for the forward hold, and the contract requirement was for each hatch being able to handle 100 short tons (90,718 kg) per hour which was met in the official test by a figure of 137.5 short tons (124,738 kg) per hour. An advantage of the Isherwood framing was a weight saving that allowed Orion to carry the specified deadweight on a draft of 26 feet 10.5 inches (8.2 m) instead of the contracted draft at that load of 27 feet 7.5 inches (8.4 m) allowing for an increase of 500 short tons (453,592 kg) of coal at specified draft. Propulsion was by two triple expansion steam engines with cylinders of 27 inches (68.6 cm), 46 inches (116.8 cm) and 76 inches (193.0 cm) diameter and a 48 inches (121.9 cm) stroke with steam from three double ended Scotch boilers driving two 16 feet 6 inches (5.0 m) three bladed propellers with 18 feet (5.5 m) mean pitch with average trial speed of 14.468 knots (16.649 miles per hour; 26.795 kilometres per hour) achieved.

== Service history ==
=== Atlantic Fleet, 1912–1917 ===
Assigned to general collier duty with the Atlantic Fleet in September, Orion remained in the western Atlantic until placed in reserve at Norfolk on 9 October 1914. Recommissioned on 28 December, she continued to serve the Atlantic Fleet until ordered to Cavite in January 1917.

=== World War I, 1917–1918 ===
Orion was at Colón in the Canal Zone when the United States entered World War I in April 1917. Orion remained there until 21 May, then returned to Norfolk, whence she steamed to the Azores for operations during June and July. During the latter month, she also assisted in placing a defensive chain across the harbor at Ponta Delgada.

While in Ponta Delgada, the large German cruiser-type U-boat SM U-155 bombarded the port on July 4 at 3 a.m. The resulting attack damaged several buildings and killed four civilians. To the surprise of the German U-boat crew, as they did not see Orion, Orion's crew responded with its 3-inch gun and engaged in a gun duel with the U-boat for about twelve minutes. Neither vessel hit the other, but U-155 eventually withdrew from the action. The Portuguese government later awarded Orion's crew the Order of the Tower and Sword in thanks.

Returning briefly to Hampton Roads, Orion departed again on 18 August and carried coal and drafts of men to Bahia, Brazil for further transfer to Frederick, Mount Baker, and Glacier. During the fall she served on the east coast from Norfolk to Boston, then, in January 1918, joined the Naval Overseas Transportation Service (NOTS).

Continuing her collier duties under NOTS, she served on general duty in Chesapeake Bay until she steamed south again in April. In May, she off-loaded coal at Montevideo, then headed back toward New York. Just after departing the former, she sighted an enemy submarine and fired on it, chasing it off. On arrival back in the United States, she resumed her more mundane coastal collier duties.

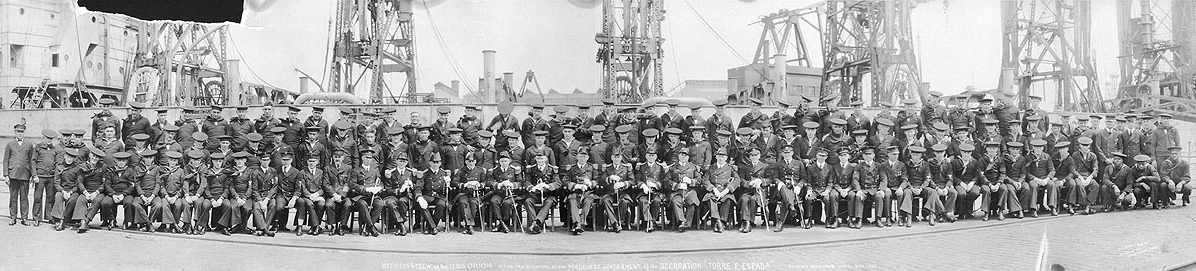
USS Orion company in Boston after being awarded the Order of the Tower and Sword by the government of Portugal.

=== Pacific Fleet, 1918–1925 ===
After the end of the war and the completion of a coal run to France, Orion returned to the United States, and on 5 February 1919 was detached from NOTS and assigned to duty with the Atlantic Fleet. In June, she steamed to the west coast where she joined the Pacific Fleet and for the next year resupplied ports on the west coasts of both North and South America. In August, she was transferred to the Naval Transport Service, then on maneuvers in the West Indies, and with that service continued to supply fleet units until December 1925.

=== Decommissioning and sale ===
Then ordered inactivated, she decommissioned at Norfolk on 18 June 1926. Struck from the Naval Vessel Register on 10 July 1931, she was sold to the Union Ship Building Co., Baltimore, Maryland on 30 August 1933.

== Bibliography ==
- International Marine Engineering (1912). "United States Naval Collier Orion: Built in Record Time". International Marine Engineering. XVII (10). New York, New York: Aldrish Publishing Company: 418–419.
- Naval History And Heritage Command. "Orion". Dictionary of American Naval Fighting Ships. Naval History And Heritage Command. Archived from the original on March 21, 2004.
