= SM U-153 =

Coordinates: 50°15′00″N 4°14′10″W

History

German Empire
- Name: U-153
- Ordered: 29 November 1916
- Builder: Reiherstiegwerft, Hamburg
- Launched: 19 July 1917
- Commissioned: 17 November 1917
- Fate: Surrendered 24 November 1918; Scuttled English Channel 30 June 1921

General characteristics
- Class & type: Type U 151 submarine
- Displacement: 1,512 tonnes (1,488 long tons) (surfaced); 1,875 tonnes (1,845 long tons) (submerged); 2,272 tonnes (2,236 long tons) (total)
- Length: 65.00 m (213 ft 3 in) (o/a); 57.00 m (187 ft) (pressure hull)
- Beam: 8.90 m (29 ft 2 in) (o/a); 5.80 m (19 ft) (pressure hull)
- Height: 9.25 m (30 ft 4 in)
- Draught: 5.30 m (17 ft 5 in)
- Installed power: 800 PS (590 kW; 790 bhp) (surfaced); 800 PS (590 kW; 790 bhp) (submerged)
- Propulsion: 2 × shafts, 2 × 1.60 m (5 ft 3 in) propellers
- Speed: 12.4 knots (23.0 km/h; 14.3 mph) surfaced; 5.2 knots (9.6 km/h; 6.0 mph) submerged
- Range: 25,000 nmi (46,000 km; 29,000 mi) at 5.5 knots (10.2 km/h; 6.3 mph) surfaced, 65 nmi (120 km; 75 mi) at 3 knots (5.6 km/h; 3.5 mph) submerged
- Test depth: 50 metres (160 ft)
- Complement: 6 officers, 50 enlisted
- Armament: 2 50 cm (20 in) bow torpedo tubes; 18 torpedoes; 2 × 15 cm (5.9 in) SK L/45 deck guns with 1672 rounds; 2 × 8.8 cm (3.5 in) SK L/30 deck guns with 764 rounds

Service record
- Part of: U-Kreuzer Flotilla; Unknown start - 11 November 1918
- Commanders: KrvKpt. Gernot Goetting; 17 November 1917 - 31 July 1918; KrvKpt. Paul Pastuszyk; 1 August - 11 November 1918
- Operations: 1 patrol
- Victories: 3 merchant ships sunk (9,428 GRT); 1 auxiliary warship sunk (3,314 GRT)

SM U-153 (Note: "SM" stands for "Seiner Majestät" (English: His Majesty's) and combined with the U for Unterseeboot would be translated as His Majesty's Submarine.) was one of the 329 submarines serving in the Imperial German Navy in World War I. U-153 was engaged in the naval warfare and took part in the First Battle of the Atlantic.

U-153 was surrendered to the Allies at Harwich on 24 November 1918 in accordance with the requirements of the Armistice with Germany. Exhibited at Greenwich in December 1918, she was originally to be allocated to France, but was swapped with U-162 and retained by the British. Laid up at Portsmouth, she was towed into the English Channel on 30 June 1921 and scuttled.

== Summary of raiding history ==
Date	Name	Nationality	Tonnage (Note: Merchant ship tonnages are in gross register tons. Military vessels are listed by tons displacement.)	Fate
15 March 1918	Alessandra	Kingdom of Italy	2,394	Sunk
14 April 1918	Santa Isabel	United Kingdom	2,023	Sunk
25 April 1918	HMS Willow Branch	Royal Navy	3,314	Sunk
9 May 1918	Enrichetta	Kingdom of Italy	5,011	Sunk

== Bibliography ==
- Gröner, Erich; Jung, Dieter; Maass, Martin (1991). U-boats and Mine Warfare Vessels. German Warships 1815–1945. Vol. 2. Translated by Thomas, Keith; Magowan, Rachel. London: Conway Maritime Press. ISBN 0-85177-593-4.
- Jung, Dieter (2004). Die Schiffe der Kaiserlichen Marine 1914-1918 und ihr Verbleib [German Imperial Navy ships 1914-1918 and their fate] (in German). Bonn: Bernard & Graefe. ISBN 3-7637-6247-7.
