= SS Wegadesk =

Steam cargo ship built in 1908

History

Norway
- Name: Wegadesk
- Namesake: Northern Lights
- Owner: A. F. Klaveness & Co
- Operator: D/S A/S "Klaveness" (May 1908-May 1916); D/S A/S "Wegadesk" (May 1916-March 1918)
- Builder: Burmeister & Wain, Copenhagen
- Yard number: 264
- Launched: 11 April 1908
- Commissioned: 14 May 1908
- Homeport: Kristiania
- Identification: Call sign MFBW
- Fate: Sunk, 13 March 1918

General characteristics
- Type: Cargo ship
- Tonnage: 4,271 GRT; 2,387 NRT; 7,318 DWT
- Length: 360 ft 0 in (109.73 m)
- Beam: 51 ft 8 in (15.75 m)
- Depth: 28 ft 3 in (8.61 m)
- Installed power: 413 Nhp
- Propulsion: Burmeister & Wain 3-cylinder triple expansion
- Speed: 12.5 knots

Wegadesk was a steam cargo ship built in 1908 by the Burmeister & Wain of Copenhagen for A. F. Klaveness & Co of Sandefjord. Her name means Northern Lights in Mi'kmaq language. The ship was primarily employed as an ore and coal carrier during her career.

== Design and construction ==
Wegadesk was laid down at Burmeister & Wain shipyard in Copenhagen and launched on 11 April 1908 (yard number 264), with Mrs. Asmundsen Skaal, wife of the shipyard president being the sponsor. After successful completion of sea trials Wegadesk was handed over to her owners on May 14. The ship was specially designed for ore and coal transportation between North America and Europe.

As built, the ship was 360 feet 0 inches (109.73 m) long (between perpendiculars) and 51 feet 8 inches (15.75 m) abeam, a mean draft of 28 feet 3 inches (8.61 m). Wegadesk was assessed at 4,271 GRT, 2,387 NRT and 7,318 DWT. The vessel had a steel hull, and a single 413 nhp triple-expansion steam engine, with cylinders of 26-inch (66 cm), 42-inch (110 cm), and 70-inch (180 cm) diameter with a 48-inch (120 cm) stroke, that drove a single screw propeller, and moved the ship at up to 12.5 knots (14.4 mph; 23.2 km/h).

== Operational history ==
After delivery Wegadesk was immediately chartered to the Nova Scotia Steel & Coal Company, and left for Wabana via Tyne on 17 May 1908. Upon arrival, the ship loaded iron ore and left for Rotterdam on 2 June, reaching there on 12 June. The vessel continued serving Wabana to Rotterdam route for the rest of the 1908 summer navigational season. On 28 September 1908 Wegadesk, on her way from Rotterdam, had to call at Copenhagen due to leaking forepeak and had to be put into drydock for repairs. The ship returned to service on 15 October. From November 1908 through mid-January 1909, the vessel was involved in iron ore carriage from Wabana to Philadelphia. On 27 November Wegadesk collided with British steamer Ashanti in North Sydney harbor, but suffered only minor damage and was able to proceed to Philadelphia a couple of days later.

With the closure of navigational season, Wegadesk sailed to Jacksonville where she loaded 3,702 tons of phosphate rock on 26 January 1909. The ship then continued on to Savannah, Georgia and loaded 1,558 bales of cotton and other cargo for various European ports on 29 January and left for Rotterdam the next day. The vessel continued serving the Wabana-Rotterdam route through early June. On 13 May Wegadesk arrived at St. John's from Rotterdam damaged by ice. On 11 June she again arrived at St. John's from Rotterdam damaged by ice and had to undergo repairs. Subsequently, Wegadesk spent the rest of 1909 hauling coal between Sydney and Montreal.

Following the completion of 1909 navigational season, the ship was chartered to carry general cargo to Russia. The vessel departed from Baltimore on 29 December bound for Odessa and Novorossiysk carrying among other things 7,709 packages of agricultural machinery and 32,920 bales of twine. The vessel arrived in Odessa on 23 January 1910, and upon unloading sailed for Nikolaieff from Novorossiysk on 12 February to load wheat for Rotterdam. From Rotterdam Wegadesk continued on to Narvik where it loaded iron ore and departed for Philadelphia on 2 April. Upon arrival, the ship made two trips between Wabana and Philadelphia before resuming her coal carrying duties between Sydney and Montreal in late May 1910 which lasted through the end of the year.

Following the completion of 1910 navigational season, the ship was again chartered to carry general cargo to Russia. The vessel departed from Baltimore on 11 January 1911 bound for Odessa carrying among other things agricultural machinery, gasoline engines, and 17,709 bales of twine. From Odessa the ship continued again to load wheat in Nikolaieff and departed it on 9 March 1911 for Rotterdam. Subsequently, she returned to Canada in early May to resume her coal trade on the St. Lawrence river for the remainder of the year.

On 18 December 1911 Wegadesk left Wabana with a cargo of iron ore for Middlesbrough. During the first five months of 1912, the ship was employed in iron ore trade between Norwegian ports of Kirkeness and Narvik and Middlesbrough. The ship returned to Canada in June 1912 and again resumed her coal trade between Sydney and Montreal until completion of the navigational season. Wegadesk then was chartered to transport iron ore between Wabana and Emden. During one of these trips, on 7 December 1912 the ship had to call in at Falmouth due to damage sustained during stormy weather. After completing all the necessary repairs, Wegadesk departed from South Shields on 27 December to return to North America.

Upon return, Wegadesk was chartered to carry coal from Virginia ports of Norfolk and Newport News to Colón and Cuba and transport iron ore on her return voyage from Felton in Cuba to Baltimore. The ship departed for her first trip on 31 January 1913 from Norfolk and continued operating this route through 1915. During one of these trips, on 21 April 1913, Wegadesk while leaving Curtis Bay with about 6,600 tons of coal, collided with a large schooner Edward B. Winslow being tugged in to take her place at the loading pier. Fortunately, both ships only suffered minor damage and could continue their journeys without much of a delay.

Starting in 1916 Wegadesk was mainly involved in carrying goods, including wheat, from North America and coal from Great Britain to Italy. On 25 May 1915 it was reported that the owner of the vessel, A. F. Klaveness, has reassigned the ship to a newly formed holding company, D/S A/S "Wegadesk", with a capital of 174,000 NOK. At around 10:00 on 12 August 1916 Wegadesk, while on passage from Tyne to Genoa, collided with steamer Dunvegan Castle in the Downs of the river Thames, striking her bow on the starboard side. Both vessels suffered damage, mostly bent plates in the bow area, and had to proceed to port for quick repairs.

=== Sinking ===
Wegadesk departed Baltimore for her final journey on 22 February 1918 with a cargo of general goods and some metals destined for a variety of customers in Genoa. Following the protocol established by the British authorities, the ship had to call first at Gibraltar for inspection. The ship was under command of Captain Hans Hansen and had a crew of 30 men. The journey was uneventful until the morning of 10 March, when a lookout on the vessel spotted a ship with a long foremast around 10:30 in an approximate position 34°51′N 12°07′W. The ship turned out to be a German submarine. The U-boat approached Wegadesk to within a half a mile and fired several shots ordering her to stop. The crew complied, stopped the engines and lowered the lifeboats and abandoned the vessel and started rowing away. The submarine followed the crew, and ordered Captain Hansen to bring the ship papers on board the U-boat, and after their examination, a 14-man prize crew went aboard Wegadesk. The ship's crew was ordered back on board to help to transfer about 50 tons of copper and brass onto the German submarine. Besides that, food supplies, navigational instruments, tools and a few other things were taken from the ship. The transfer took several days and was finished in the afternoon of 13 March. The prize crew then planted several scuttling charges on board Wegadesk and fired them. An explosion was heard a few minutes later and the freighter quickly sank. Due to deteriorating weather conditions, the submarine quickly departed the area, and the ship's crew was left on their own. After two days of rowing, they safely reached the Moroccan coast around a town of Saphi on 15 March. It was later discovered that the German submarine Deutschland (U-155) was responsible for the ship's sinking.
