= Italian R-class submarine =

- Romolo-class submarine (Romolo)

Class overview
- Name: Romolo
- Builders: Tosi, CRDA
- Operators: Regia Marina
- Built: 1942–1943
- In service: 1943
- Planned: 12
- Completed: 2
- Canceled: 10
- Lost: 2

General characteristics
- Type: Transport submarines
- Displacement: 2,155 t (2,121 long tons) (surfaced); 2,560 t (2,520 long tons) (submerged)
- Length: 86.5 m (283 ft 10 in)
- Beam: 7.86 m (25 ft 9 in)
- Draft: 5.34 m (17 ft 6 in)
- Installed power: 2,600 bhp (1,900 kW) (diesels); 900 hp (670 kW) (electric motors)
- Propulsion: Diesel-electric; 2 × diesel engines; 2 × electric motors
- Speed: 13 knots (24 km/h; 15 mph) (surfaced); 6 knots (11 km/h; 6.9 mph) (submerged)
- Range: 12,000 nmi (22,000 km; 14,000 mi) at 9 knots (17 km/h; 10 mph) (surfaced); 100 nmi (190 km; 120 mi) at 3.5 knots (6.5 km/h; 4.0 mph) (submerged)
- Test depth: 80 m (260 ft)
- Capacity: 600 t (591 long tons) of cargo
- Complement: 63
- Armament: 2 × 450 mm (17.7 in) torpedo tubes (some boats); 3 × single 20 mm (0.8 in) AA guns

The R-class or Romolo-class submarine was a group of submarines built for the Royal Italian Navy (Regia Marina Italiana) during World War II. They were designed as blockade running transport submarines for transporting high-value cargo from Europe to Japan and vice versa. Axis-occupied Europe lacked strategic materials such as tungsten, tin and some commodities such as rubber.

== Design and description ==
The R-class submarines displaced 2,155 metric tons (2,121 long tons) surfaced and 2,560 metric tons (2,520 long tons) submerged. The submarines were 86.5 meters (283 ft 10 in) long, had a beam of 7.86 meters (25 ft 9 in) and a draft of 5.34 meters (17 ft 6 in). They had a cargo capacity of 600 tonnes (591 long tons).

For surface running, the boats were powered by two 1,300-brake-horsepower (969 kW) diesel engines, each driving one propeller shaft. When submerged each propeller was driven by a 450-horsepower (336 kW) electric motor. They could reach 13 knots (24 km/h; 15 mph) on the surface and 6 knots (11 km/h; 6.9 mph) underwater. On the surface, the R class had a range of 12,000 nautical miles (22,000 km; 14,000 mi) at 9 knots (17 km/h; 10 mph); submerged, they had a range of 110 nmi (200 km; 130 mi) at 3.5 knots (6.5 km/h; 4.0 mph).

The boats were only armed for self-defense with three 20-millimeter (0.79 in) light anti-aircraft guns. Some boats may have been equipped with a pair of internal 45 cm (17.7 in) torpedo tubes in the bow and stern.

== Boats ==
Twelve boats were ordered, but only two were completed, by Tosi:

- Remo, named after Remus, launched 28 March 1943 – Sunk by the British submarine HMS United 15 July 1943 in the Gulf of Taranto
- Romolo, named after Romulus, launched 21 March 1943 – Claimed by the British to have been sunk east of Sicily on 18 July, 1943 by a British Wellington aircraft (RAF Sq. 221/B), but sources differ regarding her fate. One source claims it was the Italian submarine Ambra that was attacked and the fate of the Romolo is unknown. Another source states that while the submarine was attacked, it continued to sail for hours, with the submarine perhaps sinking from an internal explosion.

The remaining 10 hulls were scuttled incomplete and scrapped after the war.

The sail of submarine R12 is now exhibited as a monument on the seafront of Gaeta.

== Bibliography ==
- Bagnasco, Erminio (1977). Submarines of World War Two. Annapolis, Maryland: Naval Institute Press. ISBN 0-87021-962-6.
- Chesneau, Roger, ed. (1980). Conway's All the World's Fighting Ships 1922–1946. Greenwich, UK: Conway Maritime Press. ISBN 0-85177-146-7.
- Rohwer, Jürgen (2005). Chronology of the War at Sea 1939–1945: The Naval History of World War Two (Third Revised ed.). Annapolis, Maryland: Naval Institute Press. ISBN 1-59114-119-2.
- Frampton, Viktor (2005). "Question 9/98: Italian North African Convoys of WW II". Warship International. XLII (4): 424–425. ISSN 0043-0374.

== See also ==
- Merchant submarine
- German submarine Deutschland, an unarmed transport submarine built by Germany in World War I.
