= Type U 151 submarine =

1917 class of German submarines

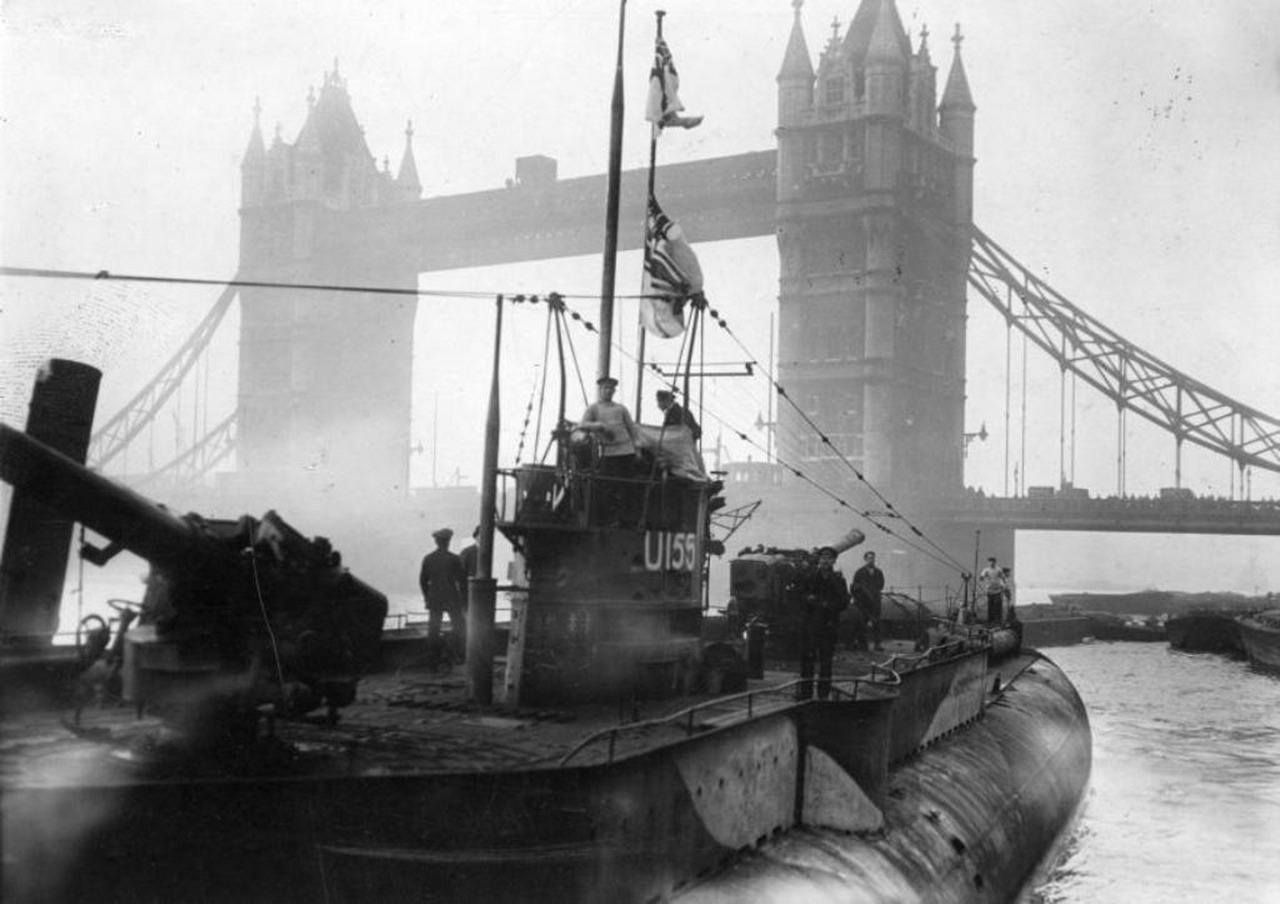
- U-155, a Type U 151 U-boat exhibited in London after the First World War.

Class overview
- Builders: Reiherstiegwerft (Hamburg); Flensburger Schiffbau (Flensburg); Atlas Werke (Bremen); Stülcken Sohn (Hamburg)
- Operators: Imperial German Navy
- Completed: 7

General characteristics
- Displacement: 1,512 tonnes (1,488 long tons) (surfaced); 1,875 tonnes (1,845 long tons) (submerged); 2,272 tonnes (2,236 long tons) (total)
- Length: 65.00 m (213 ft 3 in) (o/a); 57.00 m (187 ft) (pressure hull)
- Beam: 8.90 m (29 ft 2 in) (o/a); 5.80 m (19 ft) (pressure hull)
- Height: 9.25 m (30 ft 4 in)
- Draught: 5.30 m (17 ft 5 in)
- Installed power: 800 PS (590 kW; 790 bhp) (surfaced); 800 PS (590 kW; 790 bhp) (submerged)
- Propulsion: 2 × shafts; 2 × 1.60 m (5 ft 3 in) propellers
- Speed: 12.4 knots (23.0 km/h; 14.3 mph) surfaced; 5.2 knots (9.6 km/h; 6.0 mph) submerged
- Range: 25,000 nmi (46,000 km; 29,000 mi) at 5.5 knots (10.2 km/h; 6.3 mph) surfaced; 65 nmi (120 km; 75 mi) at 3 knots (5.6 km/h; 3.5 mph) submerged
- Test depth: 50 metres (160 ft)
- Complement: 6 officers, 50 enlisted
- Armament: 2 50 cm (20 in) bow torpedo tubes; 18 torpedoes; 2 × 15 cm (5.9 in) SK L/45 deck guns with 1672 rounds; 2 × 8.8 cm (3.5 in) Uk L/30 deck guns with 764 rounds

Type U 151 U-boats were a class of large, long-range submarines initially constructed during World War I to be merchant submarines and later used by the Kaiserliche Marine (Imperial German Navy).

== Background ==
In addition to the cargo-carrying submarines Deutschland and Bremen (disappeared on a cargo voyage in 1916 while it was still a merchant submarine), six further large cargo submarines were ordered, originally designed to ship material to and from locations otherwise denied German surface ships, such as the United States.

On 16 December 1916, four under construction in the Reiherstieg and Flensburger Schiffbau yards were taken over by the navy and converted to military specification as Type U 151 U-boats, being designated U-151 to U-154. The remaining two, along with Deutschland, which became U-155, passed into naval control in February 1917, as U-156 and U-157.

All were fitted with two bow torpedo tubes and could carry 18 torpedoes, with the exception of the former Deutschland, which was fitted with six tubes. All were armed with two 15 cm (5.9 in) SK L/45 deck guns, and carried a crew of 56. They had a cruising range of around 25,000 nautical miles (46,000 km; 29,000 mi).

The success of the Type U 151 submarines led to "Project 46", the larger Type U 139 "U-cruisers", designed from the outset as military submarines.

== Service ==
Deutschland made two successful commercial voyages before being commissioned into the Kaiserliche Marine on February 17, 1917, as U-155.

Max Valentiner commanded a Type U 151 U-boat, U-157, and undertook the longest cruise in the war from 27 November 1917 to 15 April 1918, a total of 139 days. High-scoring Waldemar Kophamel also commanded a Type U 151 U-boat, U-151 in late summer and fall of 1917.

== List of Type U 151 submarines ==
Seven Type U 151 submarines were built, of which six were commissioned into the Kaiserliche Marine.

- U-151
- U-152
- U-153
- U-154, sunk by HMS E35
- U-155, the former merchant submarine Deutschland
- U-156, probably lost to a mine in September 1918
- U-157

== Bibliography ==
- Gröner, Erich; Jung, Dieter; Maass, Martin (1991). U-boats and Mine Warfare Vessels. German Warships 1815–1945. Vol. 2. Translated by Thomas, Keith; Magowan, Rachel. London: Conway Maritime Press. ISBN 0-85177-593-4.
