= Submarine Cargo Vessel =

Cargo vessel proposal

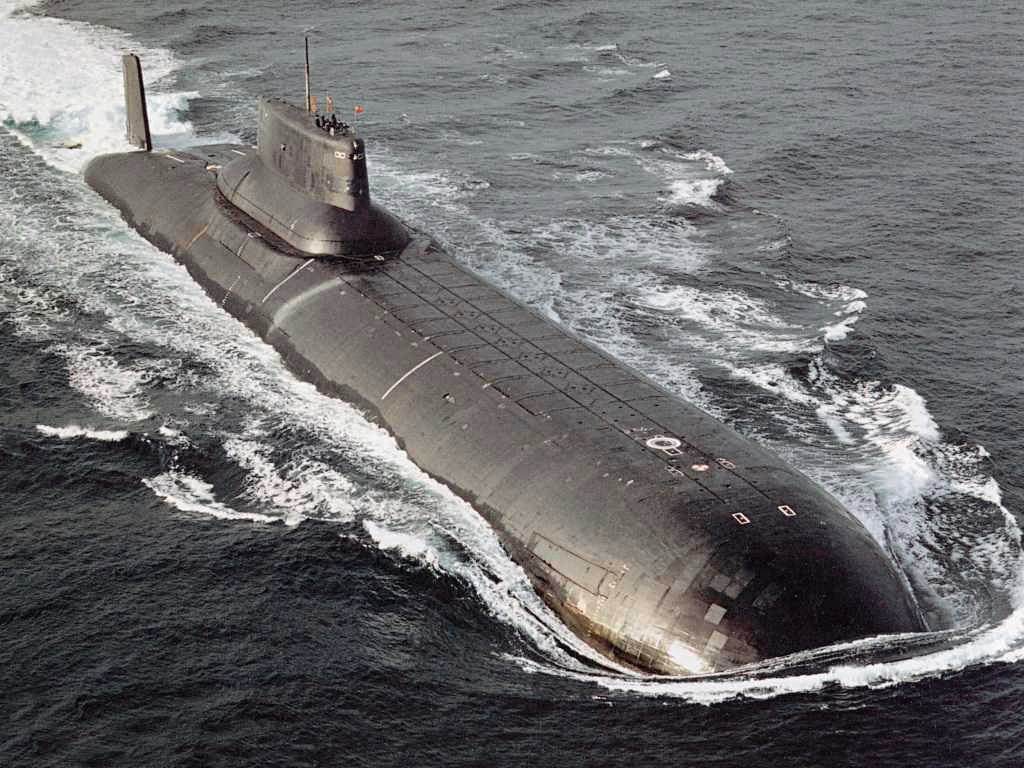
- Typhoon class submarine, the basis for the Submarine Cargo Vessel

Class overview
- Operators: Russian Navy

General characteristics
- Class & type: Typhoon-class submarine
- Length: 175 m (574 ft 2 in)
- Beam: 23 m (75 ft 6 in)
- Draft: 12 m (39 ft 4 in)
- Propulsion: 2 × pressurized-water nuclear reactors; 2 shafts
- Speed: 2–3 knots (3.7–5.6 km/h; 2.3–3.5 mph) surfaced (with solid ice cover up to 2.6 m); 16–18 knots (30–33 km/h; 18–21 mph) submerged
- Test depth: 400 m (1,300 ft)
- Capacity: Up to 10,000 t (9,842 long tons) of cargo
- Complement: 163 men (original Typhoon)
- Armament: None

The Submarine Cargo Vessel (Russian: Подводное транспортное судно) is a proposed idea from the Russian Rubin Design Bureau. The idea is to use decommissioned SSBNs (nuclear-powered ballistic missile submarine) from the Russian Navy to carry cargo under the Arctic Ocean. The reason for this solution is that it would be considerably cheaper than designing and producing an entirely new type of submarine.

== Concept ==
The basis for the project is a Project 941 Typhoon class submarine, which was designed by Rubin in 1976. It would have its ballistic missile launchers removed and replaced with cargo holds, as well as receive extra reinforcement for surface icebreaking.

The concept of Submarine Freight Transportation System (SFTS) was suggested in 1997 by Vladimir Postnikov. Present time this system is considered as a sea subsystem of Global Intelligent Transportation System.

== See also ==
- Merchant submarine
