= German submarine U-162 =

U-162 may refer to one of the following German submarines:

- SM U-162, a Type U 93 submarine launched in 1918; served in World War I until surrendered on 20 November 1918; became the French submarine Pierre Marrast until 27 January 1937; broken up
- German submarine U-162 (1941), a Type IXC submarine that served in World War II until sunk on 3 September 1943
