= Fidélitas University =

Private university in Costa Rica

- Universidad Fidélitas
- Motto: Impulsándote al éxito (Spanish)
- Established: 1980
- Students: 6,000
- Location: San José, Costa Rica
- Website: http://ufidelitas.ac.cr/

Fidélitas University is a private university in San José, Costa Rica. It has two campuses, the main campus in San Pedro and a second one in Heredia.

As of 2026, Universidad Fidélitas offers 24 careers in various fields such as engineering, education, business, law and psychology.

== Scholarships ==
Fidélitas University has a scholarship program, aimed at providing fifth year students who have continued their studies a grant and incentive to further their studies.

Fidélitas also participates in a program called "Stay in Class" to cooperate against student dropout in Costa Rica.
