= German minesweeper M 107 =

History

Nazi Germany
- Name: M 107; Von der Groeben; M 507
- Builder: Joh. C. Tecklenborg, Geestemünde
- Yard number: 317
- Laid down: 1917
- Launched: 3 July 1918
- Commissioned: 30 July 1918
- Fate: Sunk 15 June 1944 at Boulogne

General characteristics
- Class & type: M1916-class minesweeper
- Displacement: 548 tonnes (539 long tons) max; 508 tonnes (500 long tons) designed
- Length: 59.60 m (195 ft 6 in) o/a; 56.10 m (184 ft 1 in) CWL
- Beam: 7.30 m (23 ft 11 in)
- Draught: 2.15 m (7 ft 1 in)
- Propulsion: two triple-expansion engines, 1,840 PS (1,353 kW; 1,815 ihp)
- Speed: 16.0 knots (29.6 km/h; 18.4 mph)
- Range: 2,000 nmi (3,700 km; 2,300 mi) at 14 knots (26 km/h; 16 mph)
- Complement: 59
- Armament: 2 × 10.5 cm (4.1 in) SK L/45 guns; 30 naval mines

Service record
- Operations: Battle of the Danzig Bay; Action of 17-18 August 1942

German minesweeper M 107 was a mine-warfare vessel built for the Imperial German Navy during World War I, which served in the Reichsmarine and later the Kriegsmarine of World War II.

Laid down in 1917 at the Joh. C. Tecklenborg shipyard in Geestemünde, M 107 was launched on 3 July 1918 and commissioned on 30 July of the same year.

At the end of the war, M 107 was part of the 10th half-flotilla of the 4th Minesweeping Flotilla, based at Helgoland. After active service in 1918, the ship was retained by the Reichsmarine, which was renamed Kriegsmarine in 1935. On 15 April 1939, M 107 was re-classified as a Räumbootbegleitschiff for the newly established 3. Räumbootflottille and renamed Von der Groeben.

During the Invasion of Poland by Nazi Germany, Von der Groeben participated in the Battle of the Danzig Bay and supported the attacks on the Polish fortifications in the Battle of Westerplatte.

In 1940, Von der Groeben was transferred to the 4. Räumbootflottille and participated in the Operation Weserübung, the occupation of Denmark and Norway, as part of Kriegsschiffgruppe 11. On 9 April 1940, Von der Groeben with the rest of 4. Räumbootflottille occupied Thyborøn on the coast of Jutland during the German invasion of Denmark.

Later that year, Von der Groeben served as escort on the Belgian coast until she hit a mine off Dunkirk on 18 August 1940. The seriously damaged ship was beached and later salvaged. After repairs were completed, she was re-commissioned as M 507 on 1 October 1940.

M 507 was deployed to the English Channel coast until spring 1943, and took part of several action against British coastal forces, among them the action of 17-18 August 1942 off Gravelines, when Von der Groeben, along with five other minesweepers, escorted the Italian blockade runner Fidelitas through the English Channel; two British MTBs were sunk.

She eventually transferred to the Mediterranean for service on inland waterways. On 15 June 1944, M 507 was sunk in Boulogne-sur-Mer by Royal Air Force aircraft.
