= SS Fidelitas =

WWII Italian blockade runner

Coordinates: 62.5031°N 5.779°E

History
- Name: Fidelitas
- Owner: Lancashire Shipping Company (1914-1937); Minerva Steam Ship Company (1937-1939); Società Anonima di Navigazione Mare Nostrum (1939-1943); Reichsverkehrsministerium/Dampfschifffahrts-Gesellschaft Hansa (1943–1944)
- Port of registry: Genoa
- Builder: William Hamilton & Company Ltd.
- Launched: 14 April 1914
- Out of service: 27 November 1944
- Identification: JDFO (1914-1939); Call sign; ICEI (1939-1943); Call sign; DYAY (1943-1944); Call sign
- Fate: Sunk by British aircraft off Ålesund in 1944

General characteristics
- Type: Freighter
- Tonnage: 5,826 GRT
- Length: 129.3 m (424 ft 3 in)
- Beam: 16.15 m (53 ft 0 in)
- Draught: 9.1 m (29 ft 10 in)
- Installed power: 568 hp (424 kW)
- Propulsion: 1 x 3 triple expansion engine, single shaft, 1 screw
- Speed: 9 knots (17 km/h; 10 mph)

SS Fidelitas (former SS Bolton Castle) was an Italian World War II blockade runner. The steamer, escorted by German minesweepers, ran from Biscay through the English Channel in 1942, en route to Rotterdam. Fidelitas later operated in Norwegian waters, under German flag, before being sunk by RAF aircraft off Ålesund in 1944.

== Early career ==
The freighter was built as Bolton Caste in the shipyards of William Hamilton & Company, Port Glasgow, and launched on 14 April 1914. The next month she was acquired by the Lancashire Shipping Company Ltd., from Liverpool, and the ship travelled the London-Genoa-Singapore-Manila-New York route.

On 16 February 1916, while berthed at New York, Bolton Castle, along with the steamer Pacific were damaged when a fire that broke out in the port facilities spread to the barges in harbour, some of them loaded with ammunition and fuel, as part of a convoy to Vladivostok, Russia. The master, his wife and six members of the crew had a narrow escape, while one crewmember died in the accident. By October 1916, she was back in service, plying the America-Far East rout.

In 1937 Bolton Castle was sold to Minerva Steam Ship Company from London.

== Italian service ==
The ship was bought by the Società Anonima di Navigazione Mare Nostrum, from Genoa, in 1939, and renamed Fidelitas. The merchant ship sailed on the route from Genoa to different ports in the Americas.

On 10 May 1940, while arriving in Vlissingen, in the Netherlands, during a journey from New York to Antwerp, Fidelitas was bombed and hit by German Ju 88 bombers, which took her for an Allied ship. One sailor was killed and five wounded, but the vessel reached her port of destination the next day.

With the German invasion of Belgium under way, Fidelitas was one of the few ships to remain in Antwerp at the time. Italy was still a neutral country. She left Antwerp on 15 May without unloading, only to be attacked twice, both by German Ju 87 dive bombers and coastal batteries. Two more crewmembers were killed, and the Italian merchant ship Foscolo, which was also steaming out of Antwerp, was sunk.

=== Internment in Spain ===
The next month, just a few weeks before Italy´s entry in World War II, Fidelitas was at anchor in the Irish port of Cork. After a brief stay at Dublin, the vessel reached Cardiff, where her master intended to resupply the ship with coal, food and fresh water, but she sailed away when the Italian consul in the city told the captain of the imminent declaration of war by Italy.

Fidelitas hastily set sail to Corunna, where she arrived in on 10 June. The Italian consul informed the master at evening that Italy had declared war to France and Britain. Spanish authorities interned the ship and moved her to Ferrol, where she remained inactive with a skeleton complement of five.

In March 1942, the ship was chartered by the German company DDG Hansa. A replacement crew arrived from Italy, and the ship was repaired and refitted first at Ferrol and later at Bilbao before sailing for Bordeaux with a cargo of iron ore. The merchant was fitted with mountings for antiaircraft guns, to be manned by German personnel.

=== Blockade runner ===
Having spent some months at Bordeaux, Fidelitas departed in July for Brest. There, the Italian vessel would be escorted by the German minesweepers Von der Groeben (M 107), V 1501, V 1506 and V 1809 through the English Channel. The scheduled destination was Rotterdam, with Cherbourg, Les Hardreaux, Le Havre, Dunkirk and Dieppe as ports of call.

==== Action of 17/18 August 1942 ====
Action of 17/18 August 1942
- Part of the Battle of the Atlantic of World War II
| Date | 17/18 August 1942 |
| Location | English Channel |
| Result | Axis victory |

Belligerents
| United Kingdom | Germany; Italy |

Commanders and leaders
| (United Kingdom) C. L. G. Philpotts | (Fascist Italy) Aldo Martinero |

Strength
| 6 motor torpedo boats Coastal batteries | 4 minesweepers 1 armed merchant ship Coastal batteries |

Casualties and losses
| 2 motor torpedo boats sunk 2 motor torpedo boats damaged 9 killed | none |

In anticipation of the pass of the Fidelitas and her escort, the Royal Navy sent six motor torpedo boats (MTBs) to lurk in an area between Calais and Gravelines, in a position east-southeast from South Foreland. The flotilla was MTB 218, MTB 219, MTB 24, MTB 38, MTB 43 and MTB 204.

The convoy was shelled by 381 mm coastal batteries on their passage through Dover at midnight; the British Admiralty reported that 26 rounds were fired on Fidelitas and her escorts. The same source said that German artillery bombarded South Foreland with 14 rounds from the French coast from 0:30 to 01:00.

Fidelitas convoy was engaged by the MTBs between Dover and Gravelines at 01:35. MTB 204 and MTB 38 attacked with torpedoes and even depth charges, claiming one torpedo hit on an escort vessel. MTB 43 was hit by the escorts and left on fire north of Gravelines; she eventually sank and most of her crew was rescued by MTB 24. MTB 218 was also struck by return fire and lost two engines. The MTB was left adrift and sank when she hit two mines while trying to limp away through a mined area. The action died down by 2:40. Six seamen were killed on MTB 218, another two on MTB 43 and another one aboard MTB 38. The battle was visible from Dover Castle.

During the engagement Fidelitas' master, Aldo Martinero, ordered full reverse just in time to dodge two torpedoes fired by the British MTBs.

The convoy arrived unscathed in Dunkirk at 6:50.

== Rotterdam to Bergen ==
After unloading her cargo of iron ore and replenishing at Rotterdam, Fidelitas carried out a new delivery mission from Rotterdam to Bergen, in Norway, passing across the Kiel Canal. From 1942 and into 1943, Fidelitas operated along the Norwegian coast, carrying supplies for the German coastal garrisons in the region.

On 10 April 1943, Fidelitas was part of a nine ship German convoy bound for Finnmark, shepherded by an escort of eleven minesweepers and antisubmarine vessels. The ships survived the attack of a Soviet submarine and several aircraft of the same nationality before arrival.

On 30 July 1943, a secret report from the Abwehr at Wilhemshaven expressed their concerns regarding the loyalty of the Italian crew following the fall of Mussollini, fearing that the ship could try to defect to the Allies during a planned journey from Hamburg to Narvik.

=== Under German flag ===
The Italian ship was confiscated by German authorities on 8 September 1943, after the Cassibile armistice, and her crew was put under arrest. The Reichsverkehrsministerium (Minister of Transport) put the freighter under full control of the DDG Hansa. Captain Martinero was replaced for Giacomo Piana and the bulk of the crew was drafted from Italian sailors perceived as still loyal to Fascism and from anti-communist Russian and Ukrainians, plus German military personnel to man the ship's armament. The chief mate was also a German. Fidelitas was intended to cover the route between Denmark and Norway.

==== Sinking ====
On 27 November 1944, barely 30 minutes after departing from Ålesund with the German steamer Jersbek and four escorts, the convoy came under attack from RAF Beaufighters bombers from 404 Squadron and Beaufighters torpedo-bombers from 489 Squadron. While an escort minesweeper and Jersbek were engaged with rockets and damaged, Fidelitas was strafed with heavy machine guns and hit by two torpedoes. Loaded with heavy metals, the ship sank very quickly. The explosion of her boilers after the sinking is believed to have killed a number of survivors. Two Beaufighters were damaged by anti-aircraft fire but all the aircraft returned safely to their base.

Only nine members of the crew were rescued. Captain Piana, German Commander Janssen, 16 Italian ratings, 13 German ratings, seven Ukrainians and one Norwegian sailor went down with the ship.

== Bibliography ==
- Frädrich, Lothar, and Naims, Günther (2003). Seekrieg im Ärmelkanal. Vorpostenboote an vorderster Front. Mittler & Sohn. ISBN 3813208109 (in German)
