= Blockade runner =

Merchant ship used to evade a naval blockade

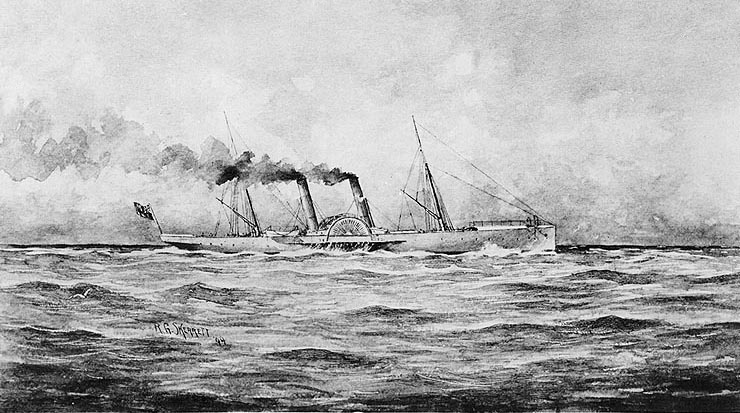
American Civil War blockade runner USS Banshee, 1863

A blockade runner is a merchant vessel used for evading a naval blockade of a port or strait. It is usually light and fast, using stealth and speed rather than confronting the blockaders in order to break the blockade. Blockade runners usually transport cargo, for example bringing food or arms to a blockaded city. They have also carried mail in an attempt to communicate with the outside world.

Blockade runners are often the fastest ships available, and come lightly armed and armored. Their operations are quite risky since blockading fleets would not hesitate to fire on them. However, the potential profits (economically or militarily) from a successful blockade run are tremendous, so blockade-runners typically had excellent crews. Although having modus operandi similar to that of smugglers, blockade-runners are often operated by states' navies as part of the regular fleet; states having operated them include the Confederate States of America during the American Civil War, and Germany during the World Wars.

== In history ==
=== Ancient Greece, Peloponnesian War ===
There were numerous blockades and attempts at blockade running during the Peloponnesian War. With his fleet blockaded, Leon of Salamis dispatched blockade runners to seek reinforcements from Athens.

=== Ancient Rome, Punic Wars ===
During the Punic Wars, the Carthaginian Empire attempted to evade Roman navy blockades of its ports and strongholds. At one point, blockade runners brought in the only food reaching the city of Carthage.

=== Middle age ===
During the 14th century, while Queen Margaret I of Denmark's forces were besieging Stockholm, the blockade runners who came to be known as the Victual Brotherhood engaged in war at sea and shipped provisions to keep the city supplied.

=== American Revolutionary War ===
Blockade runners in the American Revolution eluded the British naval blockades in order to supply resources to the army. French naval aid was vital.

=== American Civil War ===
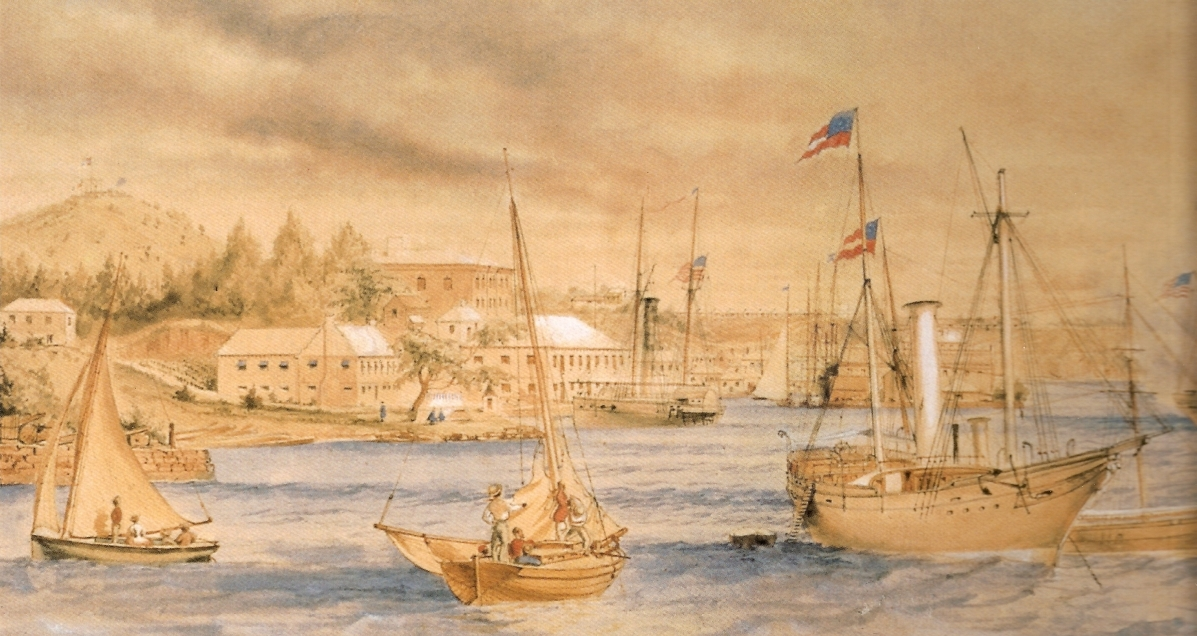
A Confederate blockade runner at anchor at St. George's, Bermuda

During the American Civil War, blockade running became a major enterprise for the Confederacy due to the Union blockade as part of the Anaconda Plan to cut off the Confederacy's overseas trade. Twelve major ports and approximately 3,500 miles of coastline along the Confederacy were patrolled by roughly 500 Union Navy ships.

The United Kingdom played a major role in Confederate blockade running. British merchants had conducted significant amounts of trade with the South prior to the war, and were suffering from the Lancashire Cotton Famine. The British Empire also controlled many of the neutral ports in the Caribbean, most notably the Bahamas and Bermuda. In concert with Confederate interests, British investors ordered the construction of steamships that were longer, narrower and considerably faster than most of the conventional steamers guarding the American coastline, thus enabling them to outmaneuver and outrun blockaders. Among the more notable was the CSS Advance that completed more than 20 successful runs through the Union blockade before being captured.

These vessels brought badly needed supplies, especially firearms, and Confederate mail. The blockade played a major role in the Union's victory over the Confederate states, though historians have estimated the supplies brought by blockade runners to the Confederacy lengthened the duration of the war by up to two years. By the end of the American Civil War, Union warships had captured more than 1,100 blockade runners and had destroyed or run aground another 355.

=== Cretan Revolt (1866–1869) ===
Greek blockade runners supplied the Christians during the Cretan revolt (1866–1869). Names of the ships include: Arkadion (named after the Arkadi Monastery, sunk by the Ottoman sloop-of-war Izzedin in August 1867); Hydra; Panhellenion; and Enosis (Unification), which was detained in Syros by Hobart Pasha in December 1868, just about the time the rebellion collapsed.

=== World War I ===
During World War I the Central Powers, most notably Germany, were blockaded by the Entente Powers. In particular the North Sea blockade made it nearly impossible for surface ships to leave Germany for the then neutral United States and other locations.

The blockade was run with cargo submarines, also called merchant submarines, Deutschland and Bremen, which reached the then neutral United States.

The Marie successfully ran the British North Sea blockade and docked, heavily damaged, in Batavia, Dutch East Indies (now called Jakarta) on May 13, 1916.

In 1917 Germany tried unsuccessfully to supply their forces in Africa by sending Zeppelin LZ104.

=== World War II ===
==== Axis blockade runners ====
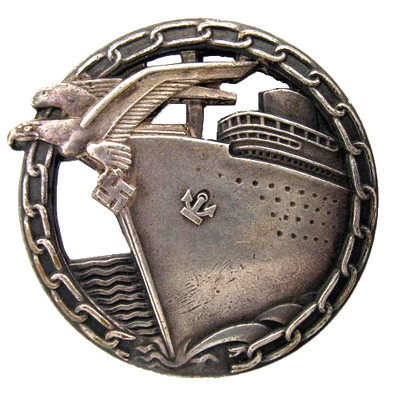
German Blockade Runner Badge

On the outbreak of war, the Royal Navy imposed a naval blockade of Germany. The fall of France provided the German occupying forces with access to the French Atlantic coast and between 1940 and 1942, many blockade running trips succeeded in delivering cargoes of critical war supplies - especially crude rubber - through the port of Bordeaux; a trade that increased with the entry of Japan into the war in December 1941. Allied attempts to disrupt these operations initially had only a limited effect; as in Operation Frankton. From 1943 improved Allied air superiority over the Bay of Biscay rendered blockade running by surface ships effectively impossible. By some counts, during the war Germans sent 32 (surface) blockade runners to Japan, only 16 of them reaching their destination. Later in the war, most of the trade between Germany and Japan was by cargo submarine.

Italian ships, interned in Spain after Italy entered the war in June 1940, crossed the Bay of Biscay to Bordeaux and some of them, such as Fidelitas and Eugenio C, dashed through the English Channel bound for Germany and Norway.

To transfer technology to Imperial Japan, on 25 March 1945 Nazi Germany dispatched a submarine, U-234, to sail to Japan. Germany surrendered before it arrived. The Japanese submarine I-8 completed a similar mission.

The German ship Ramses was in China when the war started. On Nov. 23, 1942, she attempted to sail from Batavia (now Jakarta), to Bordeaux with a cargo of rubber. The hope was that maintaining a sharp 24-hour lookout they could evade the Allied blockade. HMAS Adelaide (1918) caught and sank her.

A small number of planes succeeded in flying between the Axis-controlled Europe and the Japanese-controlled parts of Asia. The first known flight was by an Italian Savoia-Marchetti SM.75 Marsupiale, which flew in July 1942, according to various sources, either from Zaporozhye to Baotou or from Rhodes Island to Rangoon. Later, German Junkers Ju 290-A aircraft prepared for (or, according to some sources, completed) similar flights.

==== Allied blockade runners ====
During World War II, trade between Sweden (which remained neutral throughout the war) and Britain was severely curtailed by the German blockade of the Skagerrak straits between Norway and the northern tip of Denmark. In order to import vital materiel from Sweden, such as ball bearings for the British aircraft industry, five Motor Gun Boats, such as the Gay Viking, were converted into blockade runners, using winter darkness and high speed to penetrate the German maritime blockade. Larger Norwegian ships succeeded in escaping through the blockade to Britain in Operation Rubble but later attempts failed.

=== Modern era ===
In modern times, tracking equipment such as radar, sonar, and reconnaissance satellites make evading a total blockade by a world power nearly impossible. Drug smugglers and groups like the Tamil Tigers are able to run blockades due to the partial nature of the blockade, or because the navy imposing the blockade is weak and under-equipped. Reminiscent of earlier German attempts, drug smugglers have used semi-submersibles (narco-submarines) in their smuggling operations.

== See also ==
- Blockade runners of the American Civil War
- Postage stamps and postal history of the Confederate States § Blockade runners
- List of ships captured in the 19th century § American Civil War
- Airbridge (logistics), the route and means of delivering material by an airlift, sometimes across blockades
- CSS Lark
- Merchant submarine, first invented for blockade running in World War I
- Type 4 Ka-Tsu
- Hobart Pasha
- Swedish overseas trade during World War II
- Tantive IV, fictional spaceship in the Star Wars film series, referred to as a blockade runner

== Bibliography ==
- Coker, P. C., III. Charleston's Maritime Heritage, 1670-1865: An Illustrated History. Charleston, S.C.: Coker-Craft, 1987. 314 pp.
- Scharf, J. Thomas (1887). History of the Confederate States Navy. New York: Rogers & Sherwood.
- Wyllie, Arthur (2007). The Confederate States Navy.
  Lulu.com. p. 466. ISBN 978-0-615-17222-4. Url1
