= Merchant submarine =

Type of submarine intended for trade

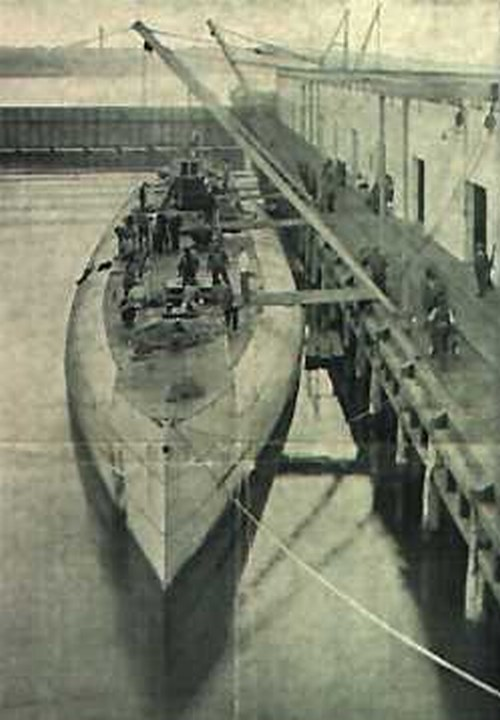
Deutschland unloading in New London, 1916.

A merchant submarine is a type of submarine intended for trade, and being without armaments, it is not considered a warship like most other types of submarines. The intended use would be blockade running, or to dive under Arctic ice.

Strictly speaking, only two submarines have so far been purpose-built for non-military merchant shipping use, outside of criminal enterprises, though standard or partly converted military submarines have been used to transport smaller amounts of important cargo, especially during wartime, and large-scale proposals for modern merchant submarines have been produced by manufacturers. Criminal enterprises have also built transport submarines to avoid authorities, such as narcosubs.

== Germany ==
Only two merchant submarines were built, both in Germany during World War I. They were constructed to slip through the naval blockade of the Entente Powers, mainly enforced by the efforts of the United Kingdom's Royal Navy. The British blockade had led to great difficulties for German companies in acquiring those raw materials which were not found in quantity within the German sphere of influence, and thus was hindering the German war efforts substantially.

The submarines were built in 1916 by a private shipping company created for the enterprise, the Deutsche Ozean-Reederei, a subsidiary company of the Norddeutscher Lloyd shipping company, now Hapag-Lloyd, and Deutsche Bank. They were intended to travel the route from Germany to the neutral US, bringing back required raw materials. As the US would not profit enough from receiving German currency, the ships were to carry trade goods both ways.

Britain soon protested with the US against the use of submarines as merchant ships, arguing that they could not be stopped and inspected for munitions in the same manner as other vessels. The US, under diplomatic pressure for supposedly showing favoritism while having declared itself neutral, rejected the argument. Even submarines, as long as they were unarmed, were to be regarded as merchant vessels and accordingly would be permitted to trade.

=== Deutschland ===
Deutschland had a carrying capacity of 700 tons, much of it outside the pressure hull, and could travel at 12.4 knots (14.3 mph; 23.0 km/h) on the surface and 7 knots (8.1 mph; 13.0 km/h) while submerged. It had a crew of 29 men and was commanded by Paul König, a former surface merchantman captain.

On its first journey to the US, departing on the 23 June 1916, Deutschland carried 163 tons of highly sought-after chemical dyes, as well as medical drugs and mail. Passing undetected through the English Channel she arrived in Baltimore on 8 July 1916 and soon re-embarked with 348 tons of rubber, 341 tons of nickel, and 93 tons of tin, arriving back in Bremerhaven on 25 August 1916. She had traveled 8,450 nautical miles (9,724 mi; 15,649 km), though only 190 nmi (219 mi; 352 km) of these submerged.

The American submarine pioneer Simon Lake had unsuccessfully negotiated to construct cargo submarines for Kaiserliche Marine prior to the war, and attempted to block Deutschland's return to Germany by raising patent infringement allegations. Lake was placated when a Krupp representative and a Norddeutscher Lloyd agent suggested Lake build 5,000-ton merchant submarines for them in the United States.

The profit from the journey was 17.5 million Reichsmarks, more than four times the construction cost, mainly because of the high prices of the patented, highly concentrated dyes, which would have cost 26,844 US dollars per pound adjusted for inflation. In return, the raw materials brought back covered the needs of the German war industry for several months.

A second journey in October–December of the same year was also successful, again trading chemicals, medicines and gems for rubber, nickel, alloys and tin. However, Deutschland was lightly damaged during a collision with a tug in New London. Following his return, captain Paul König wrote a book, or possibly had it ghostwritten, about the journeys of Deutschland. The book was heavily publicized, as it was intended to sway public opinion in both Germany and the US.

A third journey, planned for January 1917, was aborted after the US entered the war against Germany. The declaration of war had been partly due to US anger over the actions of German submarines sinking shipping bound for Great Britain, sometimes just outside American territorial waters (See SM U-53). Deutschland was taken over by the German Imperial Navy and converted into the submarine cruiser (U-Kreuzer) U-155, a type of submarine with added artillery to fight when surfaced. It was successful in three war cruises, sinking 43 ships. After the war it was taken to England as a war trophy in December 1918. Scrapped in 1921, the boat's history ended with five workers dying due to an explosion ripping apart the sub during dismantling.

=== Bremen ===
A second merchant submarine, the sister ship of Deutschland, launched its first journey in August 1916 under Karl Schwartzkopf, but never arrived in the US. Its fate was never decisively uncovered, though she may have collided with the British armed merchant cruiser HMS Mantua south of Iceland, as was theorized after the war. There was also the theory that she might have hit a mine off the Orkney Islands.

=== Other boats ===
Six further merchant submarines were in the process of being built by the Deutsche Ozean-Reederei when the US entered the war in early 1917. The construction of the merchant submarines was subsequently halted or changed into submarine cruisers, similar to the fate of Deutschland. When hostilities between Germany and the United States halted Simon Lake's attempts to build merchant submarines for Germany, Lake approached the United States Shipping Board with a proposal to build one-hundred merchant submarines to alleviate shipping losses being suffered from unrestricted submarine warfare.

In World War II, Germany used Milk Cow submarines to refuel its hunter U-boats in the Atlantic. As these boats were part of the Kriegsmarine, they did carry light armaments (anti-aircraft guns), and never engaged in trade as such, they do not qualify as merchant submarines. However, they shared the large amounts of cargo space compared to normal submarines of their day.

After large Italian submarines successfully transported supplies to North Africa avoiding British Mediterranean Fleet patrols, some of these submarines had their torpedo tubes and offensive deck gun armament removed to increase cargo capacity. Five of these converted submarines were seized in Axis ports for operation by German crews after the Italian armistice in September 1943.

Germany enlarged the ocean-going type IX U-boat design to an extended range type IXD1 variant with torpedo tubes removed and battery capacity reduced to increase cargo capacity for transport of strategic materials between German and Japanese ports. After the Italian submarines were converted for this cargo role, most of the extended range design were completed as an armed type IXD2 variant.

German submarine U-234, a Type X, left port in April 1945 carrying a cargo of uranium oxide, Me-262 jet fighter planes and various other items and high-ranking officers bound for Japan, but Germany surrendered while they were still in the Atlantic.

== Italy ==
A 12-boat R class of 2,100-GRT submarines had been designed in Italy to carry approximately 600 long tons (610 t) of cargo with a surface speed of 13 kn (24 km/h; 15 mph) and submerged speed of 6 kn (11 km/h; 6.9 mph). A 63-man crew would operate defensive armaments of three 20 mm guns. Romolo and Remo were laid down in July 1942 at the Tosi Yard in Taranto with launch scheduled for March 1943. Ten large submarines built for combat service were also scheduled for conversion to merchant service after their designs had been found unsuitable for use against Allied convoys. These were the 880-GRT Archimede, the 940-GRT Barbarigo, the 951-GRT Comandante Cappellini, the 1,030-GRT Alpino Bagnolini and Reginaldo Giuliani, the 1,036-GRT Leonardo da Vinci and Luigi Torelli, the 1,331-GRT Enrico Tazzoli and Giuseppe Finzi, and the 1,504-GRT Ammiraglio Cagni.

Conversions were to be accomplished at Bordeaux, with armament limited to defensive machine guns, while the conversion cargo capacity of 160-GRT also reduced reserve buoyancy from 20 to 25 percent to 3.5 to 6 percent. Several French submarines captured at Bizerta—the 974-GRT Phoque, Requin, Espadon, and Dauphin—were also scheduled for conversion.

The ships were used on an eastbound route from Bordeaux to Singapore (then in Japanese, thus Axis, hands) with cargoes of mercury, steel and aluminium bars, welding steel, bomb prototypes, 20 mm guns, blueprints for tanks and bombsights and up to a dozen passengers. Return trip loadings were 110 to 155 long tons (112 to 157 t) of rubber, 44 to 70 long tons (45 to 71 t) of zinc, 5 long tons (5.1 t) of tungsten, 2 long tons (2.0 t) of quinine, 2 long tons (2.0 t) of opium, bamboo, rattan and passengers. Comandante Cappellini, Reginaldo Giuliani, and Enrico Tazzoli departed Bordeaux in May 1943. The first two completed their voyages in July and August, but Enrico Tazzoli was destroyed by Allied bombers in the Bay of Biscay. Barbarigo was similarly destroyed during a June departure but Luigi Torrelli reached Singapore in August.

Following the Italian armistice in September, Giuseppe Finzi and Alpino Bagnolini were seized by Germany while undergoing conversion at Bordeaux, and named UIT-21 and UIT-22, respectively. Reginaldo Giuliani, Commandante Cappellini, and Luigi Torelli were seized by the Japanese in the East Indies, given to Germany, as UIT-23, UIT-24 and UIT-25, respectively. UIT-22 departed Bordeaux for Sumatra in January 1944 and was destroyed by a 262 Squadron RAF Catalina bombers off South Africa in March. UIT-23 was sunk by the British submarine Tally-Ho in February. UIT-24 departed Sumatra for Bordeaux in February but returned to Sumatra in March after its refuelling ship was sunk.

Of the other ships, Ammiraglio Cagni surrendered at South Africa following the Italian Armistice, Archimede and Leonardo da Vinci were sunk before conversion to merchant service while Romolo, Remo, and the French Phoque were sunk prior to loading. The remaining R-class submarines were not completed and conversion work ceased on the remaining three French submarines.

== Japan ==
During World War II, the Imperial Japanese Navy′s I-351-class submarines and I-361-class submarines and the Imperial Japanese Army′s Type 3 submergence transport vehicles were constructed for transportation and supply.

== Soviet Union ==
The Soviet Union had plans to construct cargo submarines both during World War II and in the Cold War, but these plans were never carried out. These would not strictly count as merchant submarines, as they would have been at least lightly armed and used mainly for directly war-related duties, such as supplying troops or delivering military forces to their targets. However, in the post-Cold War period, Soviet designers also proposed purely peaceful applications.

=== World War II ===
In World War II, the Soviet Union used submarines (as well as other ships) to supply the besieged Crimean port of Sevastopol. The largest could transfer up to 95 tons of cargo, loading even the torpedo tubes with supplies. Around 4,000 tons were delivered by about 80 runs of 27 submarines, though Sevastopol still eventually fell.

Based on this experience, the Soviet naval high command initiated a transport submarine program. A first project (Project 605) envisaged a sub that would function as a barge, towed by a standard sub. The idea was discarded due to towing difficulties. Later, a small cargo submarine design (Project 607) with a capacity of 250-300 tons of solid cargo and two folding cargo cranes was proposed. No weapons beyond two deck guns were envisaged, and the design borrowed many existing parts from the earlier VI and VI-bis submarine series to simplify construction. However, by 1943 the strategic situation had changed, and the plans were not executed.

=== Cold War ===
The Soviet Union envisaged and almost realized various concepts for large cargo submarines during the 1950s and 1960s, though these would not have been counted as merchant ships, being envisaged as navy landing ships to transport troops. They would have been amongst the largest submarines of their day, had they been built.

=== Post-Cold War ===
In the 1990s, the Malachite design bureau in St. Petersburg proposed submarines capable of transporting petroleum or freight containers in or through Arctic regions. It was envisaged that these ships would dive under the polar ice cap to travel directly between European and Asian ports, and possibly northern Canada, with the designers noting that:

"Given equal cargo capacity, the efficiency of an underwater container ship is considerably higher, for example, than that of an icebreaker transport ship of the Norilsk type. The underwater tanker is competitive."

The tanker and container variants would follow the same design as standard military nuclear submarines, with the tanker variant carrying almost 30,000 tons of petroleum, to be loaded and discharged from surface or underwater terminals. The container carrier was to transport 912 standard (20-foot) freight containers, loaded within 30 hours through hatches, assisted by internal conveyance systems. However, these plans came to nothing in the hard financial straits following the Dissolution of the Soviet Union.

A similar design has been proposed by the Rubin Design Bureau with the 'Submarine Cargo Vessel', a civilian redesign of the famous Typhoon-class submarine of the Cold War. A submarine freight transportation system (SFTS) was suggested in 1997 by Vladimir Postnikov and is considered as a sea-going component of a global intelligent transportation system.

== Russia ==
In March 2020, Malakhit Marine Engineering Bureau in St. Petersburg, designers of attack submarines such as the Akula and Victor classes, proposed a submersible LNG tanker named Pilgrim that would be the largest submarine in history should the project come to fruition. Powered by three nuclear reactors, the boat would be 1,180 feet (360 m) in length with a beam of 230 feet (70 m), capable of transporting up to 180,000 tons, and would primarily sail under the Arctic ice.

== United States ==
Simon Lake's merchant submarine proposal was shelved as the World War I convoy system reduced merchant shipping losses. In July and August 1942, Lake's proposals were again mentioned in Senate Subcommittee hearings regarding cargo submarines as well as cargo aircraft. Mostly it was regarding to the vital supply of aluminum from South and Central America via submarines to avoid being sunk by enemy U-boats.

In 1931, with financial support from William Randolph Hearst, Lake and Sir Hubert Wilkins attempted to demonstrate potential use of merchant submarines to navigate under polar ice with a leased US Navy submarine, ex-USS O-12 (SS-73) (renamed Nautilus). Financial limitations of the Great Depression made this early attempt less successful than the post-war accomplishments of a nuclear-powered submarine of the same name; USS Nautilus (SSN-571).

In 1958, during a presidential address announcing the first journey of a submarine under the North pole by USS Nautilus, called Operation Sunshine, President Eisenhower mentioned that one day nuclear cargo submarines might use that route for trade.

Similar to the post-Cold War ideas of the Russian Federation, there have been some concept plans to use atomic-powered submarine oil tankers to exploit Arctic oilfields in Alaska and Siberia. General Dynamics had apparently approached German shipbuilders during the early 1980s about the possible construction of either a US$725 million nuclear-powered or a US$700 million methane-powered version of a liquefied natural gas (LNG) submarine tanker to carry LNG from the Arctic to North America and Europe. This was an expansion of an earlier 1974 United States Merchant Marine Academy scholar project by Patrick Moloney.

== Other uses ==
Another (albeit black market) type of "trade" usage is the known use of narco-submarines or "drug subs" by drug smugglers. In one case, a Colombian drug cartel was interrupted before finishing the construction of a professional-grade, 30 m long, 200 ton carrying-capacity submarine apparently intended for the cocaine trade with the US. At the time of the police raid, the submarine was being constructed in segmented parts in a warehouse high in the Andes near Bogotá. However, most drug subs so far are not as sophisticated as legal merchant submarines would be, being mainly intended to run just under the surface, rather than deeply submerged.

== See also ==
- Amphibious assault submarine
- Submarine Cargo Vessel
- Defensively Equipped Merchant Ships
