= USS Taurus (AF-25) =

Cargo ship of the United States Navy

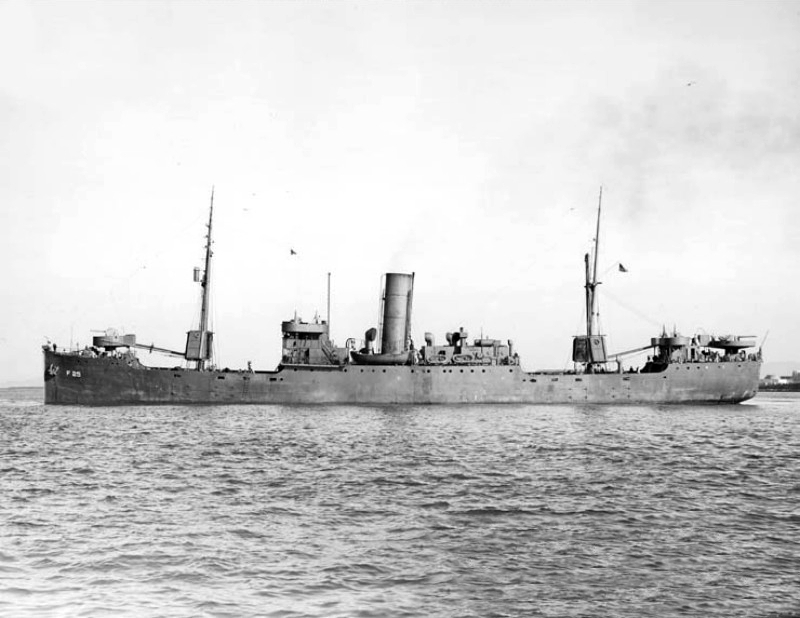

History
- Name: SS San Benito (1921–42) USS Taurus (1942–45)
- Owner: United Fruit Company Steamship Co (1921–30) Balboa Shipping Co, Inc.
- Operator: Clark and Service (1921–30) United Fruit Company (1931–42) United States Navy (1942–45)
- Port of registry: (United Kingdom) Glasgow (1921–30); (Panama) (1931–42); (United States) (1942–46)
- Builder: Workman, Clark and Company, Belfast
- Launched: 12 August 1921
- Completed: September 1921
- Acquired: 2 October 1942
- Commissioned: 28 October 1942
- Decommissioned: 11 December 1945
- Stricken: 3 January 1946
- Identification: code letters KJNS (until 1930); code letters RXCI (1933); Call sign HPCI (from 1934)
- Fate: Scrapped 1953

General characteristics
- Tonnage: 3,724 GRT; tonnage under deck 3,122; 2,086 NRT
- Displacement: 6,600 long tons (6,706 t) full load
- Length: 325.3 ft (99.2 m)
- Beam: 46.3 ft (14.1 m)
- Draft: 24 ft (7.3 m)
- Depth: 29.2 ft (8.9 m)
- Installed power: 2,500 shp
- Propulsion: BT-H turbo-electric transmission, single screw
- Speed: 13 knots (24 km/h)
- Complement: 106 (1944)
- Armament: 1 × single 4"/50 caliber guns; 1 × single 3"/50 caliber guns; 6 × single 20 mm AA gun mounts

USS Taurus (AF-25) (formerly called the SS San Benito) was a refrigerated banana boat of the United Fruit Company that may have been the first merchant ship to be built with turbo-electric transmission. From October 1942 to December 1945 she was a United States Navy stores ship in the Pacific Ocean theatre of World War II. She was scrapped in 1953.

== United Fruit Company ==
=== Building ===
Workman, Clark and Company of Belfast, Northern Ireland built San Benito in 1921, launching her on 12 August. British Thomson-Houston built her turbo generator and electric propulsion motor. The turbo generator also powered her electric refrigeration equipment.

=== Owners and managers ===
Until 1930 San Benito was owned by the United Fruit Company, which registered her in Glasgow, Scotland and contracted the British company of Clark and Service to manage her. In 1930 or 1931 United Fruit transferred San Benito to its subsidiary Balboa Shipping Company, Inc, which registered her under the Panamanian flag of convenience.

=== Subsequent turbo-electric ships ===
After San Benito, Balboa Shipping ordered further turbo-electric refrigerated ships. In 1930 Workman, Clark built SS Musa for Balboa and Cammell Laird of Birkenhead, England built Musa's sister ship SS Platano. After 1930 Balboa's diesel electric motor vessel Darien was re-engined as a turbo-electric. In 1931–33 Newport News Shipbuilding and Bethlehem Shipbuilding Corporation supplied six passenger and refrigerated cargo liners that in the Second World War were requisitioned as the Mizar-class stores ships.

== US Navy service ==
On 20 August 1942 San Benito was renamed Taurus and designated AF-25, and on 2 October 1942 the War Shipping Administration acquired her for the US Navy. The Bethlehem Shipbuilding Corporation in Alameda, California converted her into a provisions store ship, and on 28 October 1942 she was commissioned into the Navy, commanded by Lt. Cmdr. Edward T. Collins.

=== World War II Pacific Theatre operations ===
After over a month of false starts and technical problems, Taurus finally loaded cargo and left San Francisco, California, on 1 December. Her voyage to the South Pacific Ocean took her via Pago Pago, Samoa, to Auckland, New Zealand. On the voyage the ship suffered at least 32 more technical failures and lost a third of her cargo through the failure of her refrigeration plant. On arrival at Auckland, Taurus went into a five-week availability to correct as many of the deficiencies as possible before beginning her tour of duty with the Service Squadron, South Pacific Force.

Repairs were completed in the first week in February 1943 and Taurus loaded cargo bound for Espiritu Santo in the New Hebrides. On 9 February she began the first of four round-trip voyages carrying cargo between Auckland and Espiritu Santo to be staged on to the forward areas.

By August her sphere of operations was widened to include the Solomon Islands. On each of her next six voyages Taurus took cargo from Auckland via Espiritu Santo to Guadalcanal.

Through 1944 and much of 1945 Taurus continued to operate in the South Pacific on relatively uneventful supply missions. Early in 1944 she added Napier, New Zealand, and Noumea, New Caledonia, to her ports of call. By late April she was operating as far north in the Solomons as New Georgia and Bougainville. In May and June she visited Efate, Napier, Noumea, and Espiritu Santo. In July and September she made resupply runs to the Russell Islands in the Solomons. Through the end of 1944 and in the first three months of 1945, Taurus continued supplying the Solomons; primarily to Guadalcanal, Bougainville, and the Russells.

After overhaul at Auckland from 6 March to 16 April 1945, Taurus left for Hollandia, New Guinea. Through the end of August, all her voyages – save one to Manus in the Admiralty Islands – were between Auckland and Hollandia. She returned to Auckland on 30 August and departed again nine days later for New Caledonia and thence to the Philippines. After a stop at Noumea between 12 and 14 September, Taurus arrived at Samar on the 25th.

=== End-of-war duties ===
From Samar, Taurus began her voyage back to the United States. By 23 November she had transited the Panama Canal and had reported for duty with the US Atlantic Fleet. Though originally ordered to Norfolk, Virginia, she was rerouted to Taranaki, New Orleans Region. She reported to the Commandant, 8th Naval District, on 29 November 1945.

On 11 December 1945 Taurus was decommissioned and returned, via the War Shipping Administration, to her owner. Her name was struck from the Navy list on 3 January 1946.

=== Military awards and honors ===
Taurus' crew members were awarded the following medals:

- American Campaign Medal
- Asiatic–Pacific Campaign Medal
- World War II Victory Medal
