= SS Darien =

Cargo ship

History

Panama
- Name: MV La Marea (1924–29); SS Darien (1930– )
- Owner: Balboa Shipping Co, Inc.
- Operator: United Fruit Company
- Port of registry: (Panama)
- Builder: Cammell Laird, Birkenhead
- Completed: April 1924
- Identification: Call sign HPBD (from 1934)

General characteristics
- Tonnage: as built: 3,689 GRT; tonnage under deck 3,183; 2,148 NRT; after lengthening: 4,281 GRT; tonnage under deck 3,533; 2,276 NRT
- Length: as built: 325.2 ft (99.1 m) after lengthening: 352.7 ft (107.5 m)
- Beam: 48.1 ft (14.7 m)
- Draught: as built: 22 ft 5.5 in (6.85 m) after lengthening: 22 ft 6.5 in (6.87 m)
- Depth: 28.3 ft (8.6 m)
- Installed power: as built: 981 NHP; as re-engined: 839 NHP
- Propulsion: single screw; as built: diesel-electric; as re-engined: turbo-electric

SS Darien was a refrigerated cargo ship operated by the United Fruit Company. She was built by Cammell Laird of Birkenhead, England, and completed in 1924 as MV La Marea. She had been renamed Darien by 1930 and by 1931, her original diesel-electric propulsion system had been replaced with steam power

The ship was owned by Balboa Shipping Co, Inc, a subsidiary of the United Fruit Company, and registered under the Panamanian flag of convenience. She was still in service in 1945.

== Building ==
La Marea was built as a diesel-electric motor vessel, with four four-cylinder single-acting two-stroke diesel engines. They powered electric generators that supplied current to a single electric propulsion motor rated at 981 NHP that turned a single propeller shaft. She was equipped with both submarine signalling and wireless.

== Rebuilding ==
By 1930 Darien had been lengthened by 27.5 feet (8.4 m), which increased her gross register tonnage by 592 tons. By 1931 she had been converted from diesel-electric to steam turbo-electric propulsion. Her four diesel engines and four electric generators were replaced with two water-tube boilers and a single British Thomson-Houston turbo generator. Her boilers had a combined heating surface of 8,660 square feet (805 m^{2}) and a working pressure of 400 lb_{f}/in^{2}. The conversion reduced Darien's power output to 839 NHP.

Darien was not United Fruit's first turbo-electric ship. As early as 1921 Workman, Clark and Company of Belfast had completed SS San Benito for Balboa Shipping, again using a BT-H turbo generator and propulsion motor.
