= SS Musa =

History

Panama, Honduras
- Name: SS Musa
- Owner: Balboa Shipping Co. (1930– ); Empressa Hondurena de Vapores (by 1964)
- Operator: United Fruit Company
- Port of registry: (Panama) (1930– ); (Honduras) (by 1964)
- Builder: Workman, Clark and Company, Belfast
- Completed: 1930
- Identification: Call sign HPCF (from 1934)

General characteristics
- Tonnage: 5,833 GRT; tonnage under deck 5,016; 2,974 NRT
- Length: 416.4 ft (126.9 m)
- Beam: 56.3 ft (17.2 m)
- Depth: 30.9 ft (9.4 m)
- Propulsion: turbo-electric transmission, single screw
- Speed: 15.5 knots (28.7 km/h)
- Sensors & processing systems: echo sounding device
- Notes: sister ship: SS Platano

SS Musa was a refrigerated banana boat of the United Fruit Company. She was built in 1930 and still in service in 1945.

== Building ==
Musa was built by Workman, Clark and Company of Belfast, Northern Ireland and completed in 1930. United Fruit had a sister ship, SS Platano, built in the same year by Cammell Laird of Birkenhead, England.

Musa had turbo-electric transmission built by British Thomson-Houston of Rugby, Warwickshire. Her oil-fired boilers supplied steam to a turbo generator that fed current to a propulsion motor on her single propeller shaft.

== Career ==
Musa was owned by a United Fruit subsidiary, Balboa Shipping Co, Inc, which registered her under the Panamanian flag of convenience. In the Second World War the US War Shipping Administration allocated Musa and Platano to the United States Army Transportation Corps.

On 18 February 1943 the Director of the Naval Transportation Service approved acquiring the two ships as United States Navy auxiliary ships and on 1 March the Auxiliary Vessels Board endorsed the decision. Soon the plan was changed, with an older banana boat, SS Ulua, being substituted for Musa. The Navy's acquisition of Platano was deferred and in May 1944 it was finally canceled.

By 1964 United Fruit had transferred Platano from Balboa Shipping to another subsidiary, Empressa Hondurena de Vapores, which registered her under the Honduran flag of convenience.

== Sources ==
- Harnack, Edwin P (1938) [1903]. All About Ships & Shipping (7th ed.). London: Faber and Faber.
- Harnack, Edwin P (1964) [1903]. All About Ships & Shipping (11th ed.). London: Faber and Faber.
