= SS Platano =

Former cargo ship

History
- Name: 1930–1965: SS Platano; 1965–1966: SS El Toro
- Owner: from 1930: Balboa Shipping; by 1964: Empressa Hondurena de Vapores
- Operator: United Fruit Company
- Port of registry: 1930–1947: Panama; 1947–1966: Honduras
- Builder: Cammell Laird, Birkenhead, England
- Launched: 14 March 1930
- Completed: June 1930
- Identification: Call sign HPCG (from 1934)
- Fate: Scrapped 1966

General characteristics
- Tonnage: 6,012 GRT; tonnage under deck 5,151; 2,784 NRT
- Length: 416.3 ft (126.9 m) p/p 432 ft (132 m) o/a
- Beam: 56.2 ft (17.1 m)
- Draft: 25.75 ft (7.85 m) fully laden
- Depth: 30.5 ft (9.3 m)
- Propulsion: turbo-electric transmission, single screw
- Speed: 15.5 knots (28.7 km/h)
- Sensors & processing systems: echo sounding device
- Armament: 1 × 4"/50 caliber gun (1942)
- Notes: sister ship: SS Musa

SS Platano was a refrigerated banana boat of the United Fruit Company. She was built in 1930, reflagged in 1947, renamed El Toro in 1965 and scrapped in 1966.

== Building ==
Platano was built by Cammell Laird of Birkenhead, England, launched on 13 March 1930 and completed that June. United Fruit had a sister ship, SS Musa, built in the same year by Workman, Clark of Belfast, Northern Ireland.

Platano had turbo-electric transmission built by British Thomson-Houston of Rugby, Warwickshire. Her oil-fired boilers supplied steam to a turbo generator that fed current to a propulsion motor on her single propeller shaft.

== Career ==
Platano was owned by a United Fruit subsidiary, Balboa Shipping Co, Inc, which registered her under the Panamanian flag of convenience. In the Second World War the US War Shipping Administration allocated Platano and Musa to the United States Army Transportation Corps.

On 18 February 1943 the Director of the Naval Transportation Service approved acquiring the two ships as United States Navy auxiliary ships and on 1 March the Auxiliary Vessels Board endorsed the decision. On 16 March the Naval Transportation Service requested that Platano be assigned to the Navy and on 24 March the Auxiliary Vessels Board confirmed this had been done.

Soon the plan was changed, with an older banana boat, SS Ulua being substituted for Musa. On 22 April 1943 the Vice Chief of Naval Operations assigned Platano and Ulua the names and classifications USS Octans (AF-26) and USS Pictor (AF-27). Ulua was duly acquired, renamed and commissioned into the Navy but Platano was not. The Auxiliary Vessels Board decided on 22 May 1944 to cancel Platano's acquisition, and the cancellation was executed on 26 May.

In 1947 United Fruit reflagged Platano from Panama to the Honduran flag of convenience. By 1964 the company had transferred her from Balboa Shipping to another subsidiary, Empressa Hondurena de Vapores. She kept her original name until 1965, when she was renamed El Toro. She was scrapped in 1966.

== Sources ==
- Harnack, Edwin P (1938) [1903]. All About Ships & Shipping (7th ed.). London: Faber and Faber.
- Harnack, Edwin P (1964) [1903]. All About Ships & Shipping (11th ed.). London: Faber and Faber.
