= British Thomson-Houston =

British engineering and heavy industrial company

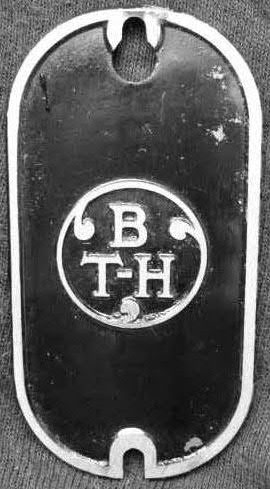
- BTH logo on an electric motor access plate
- Industry: Heavy industrial
- Founded: 1886 as Laing, Wharton and Down
- Headquarters: Rugby, Warwickshire,
- Parent: General Electric

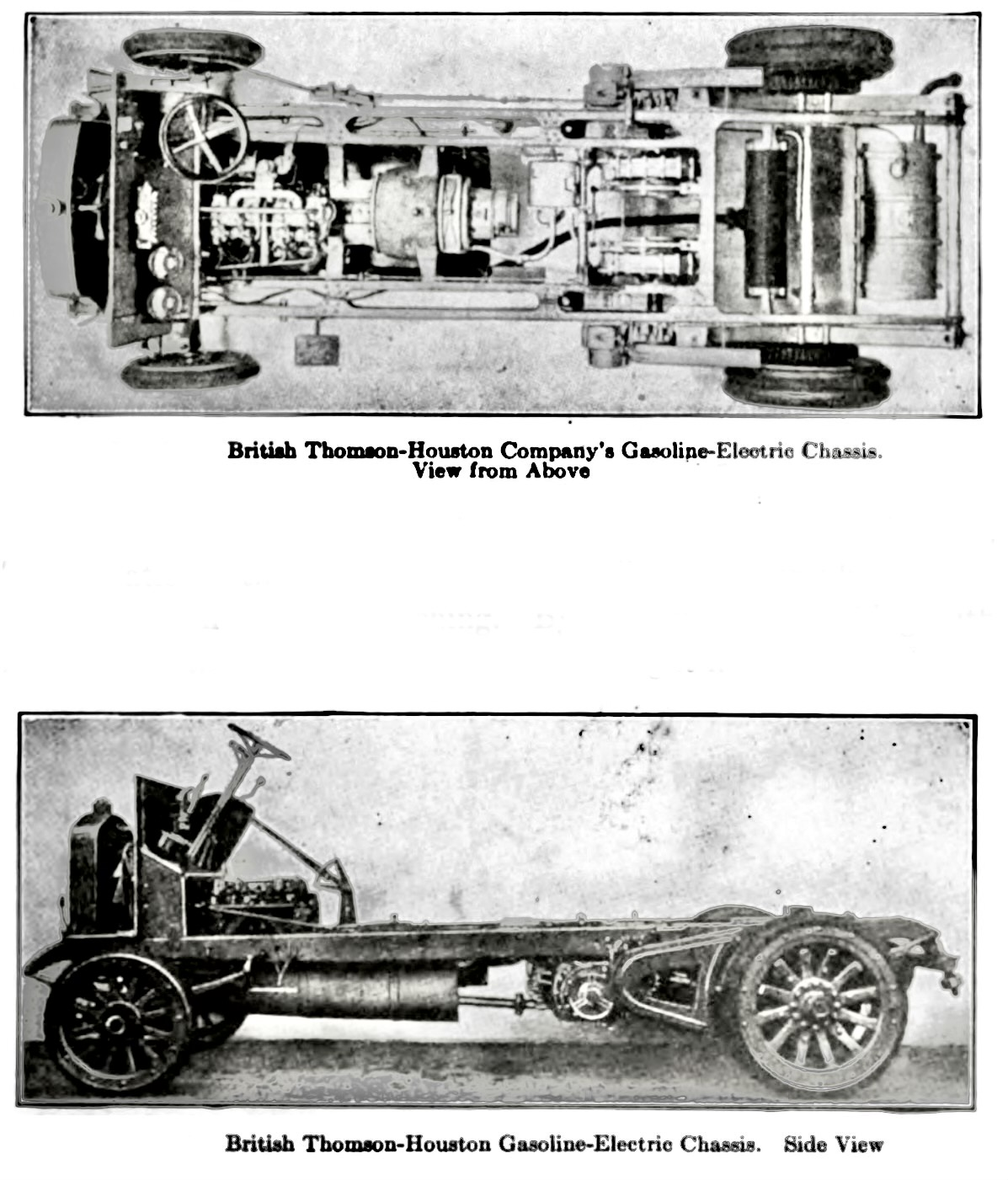
British Thomson-Houston joint venture with Wolseley Motors to make petrol-electric buses (1907-1914)

British Thomson-Houston (BTH) was a British engineering and heavy industrial company, based at Rugby, Warwickshire, England. Originally founded to sell products from the Thomson-Houston Electric Company, it soon became a manufacturer using licences from the American company. They were known primarily for their electrical systems and steam turbines.

BTH merged with the Metropolitan-Vickers company in 1928 to form Associated Electrical Industries (AEI), but the two brand identities were maintained until 1960. The holding company, AEI, was bought by GEC in 1967.

In the 1960s AEI's apprenticeships were highly thought-of, both by the apprentices themselves and by their future employers, because they gave the participants valuable experience in the design, production and overall industrial management of a very wide range of electrical products. Over a hundred of the apprentices – who came to Rugby from all over the UK, and a few from abroad – lodged in the nearby Apprentices' Hostel at Coton House which was uphill from Rugby on the road to Lutterworth and Leicester.

Each year in Rugby there was a big parade of floats run by the apprentices.

In 1980, G.E.C. Turbine Generators Ltd, on the Rugby site, was awarded a Queen's Awards for Enterprise.

== History ==
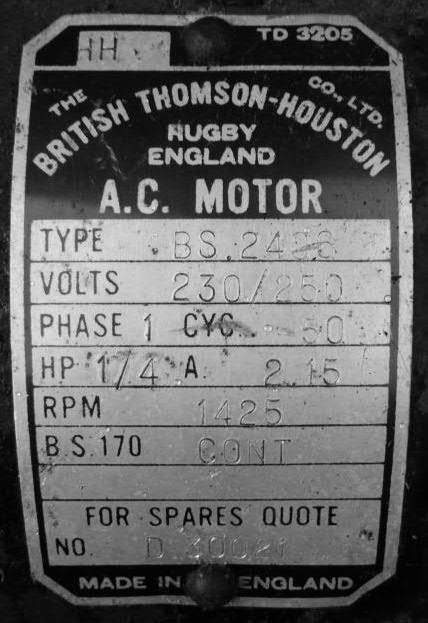
Showing correct company name and format

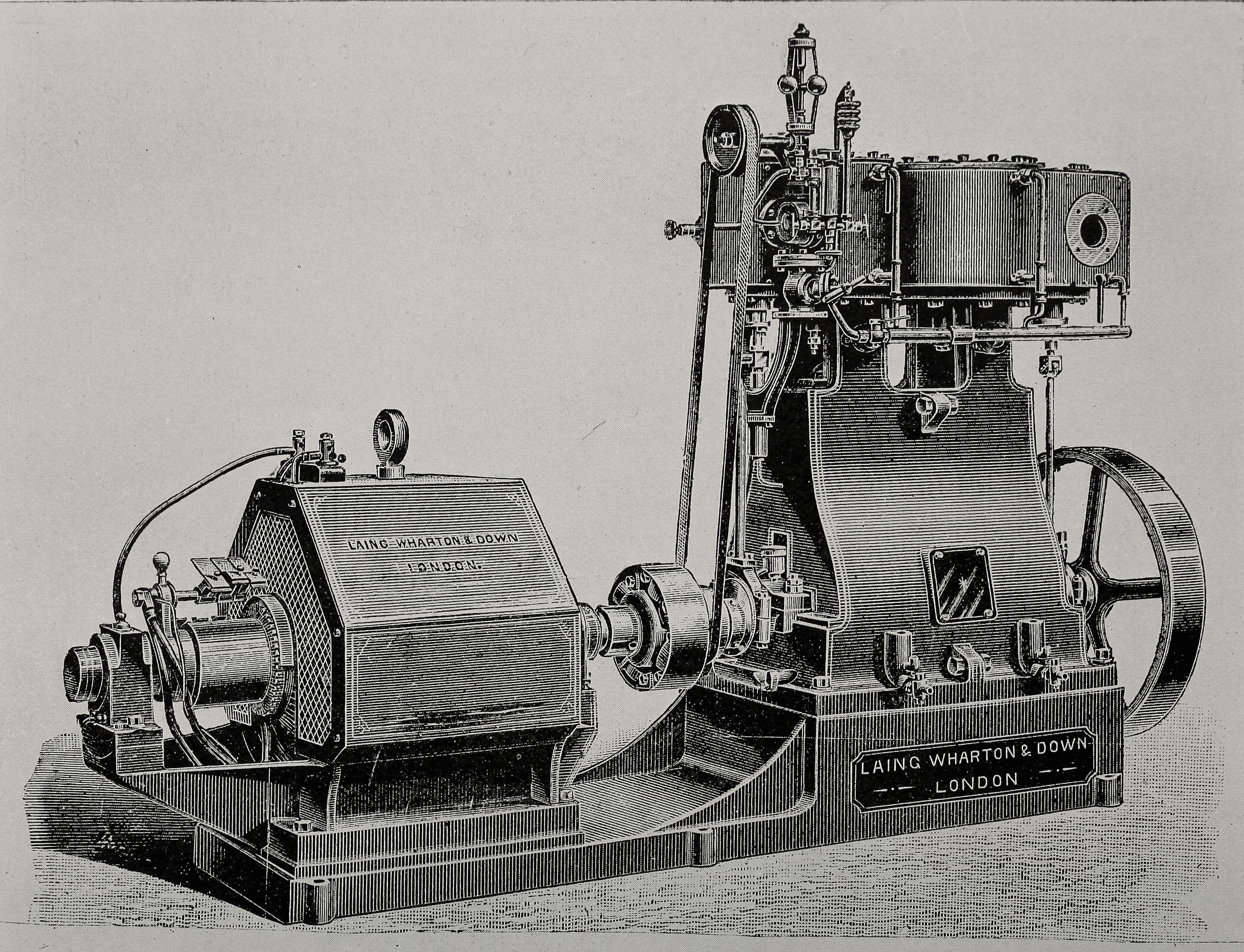
British Thomson-Houston had its origins in Laing, Wharton & Down. One of their steam-driven generators was described in the September 1892 issue of Cassier's Magazine.

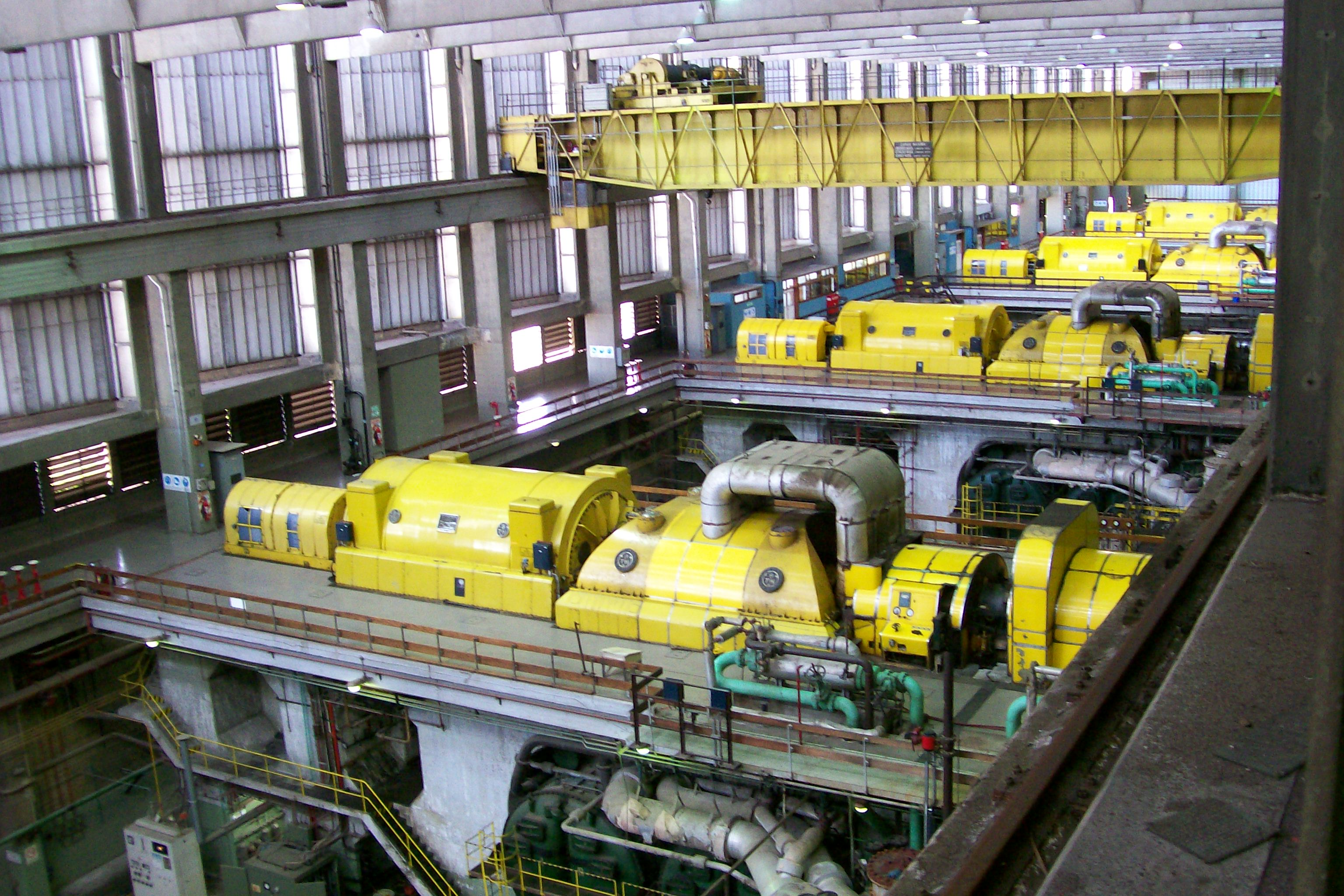
BTH 120 MW turbo-alternators, installed at Costanera Power Station, Buenos Aires, Argentina

The company Laing, Wharton and Down was formed in 1886 to sell products from the Thomson-Houston Electric Company. Laing, Wharton and Down soon won a contract for electrical lighting for the east end of London.

In 1894 Laing, Wharton and Down purchased patents and exclusive production rights from the American company, now known as General Electric after Thomson-Houston merged with Edison General Electric Company in 1892. At this stage Laing, Wharton and Down was renamed as British Thomson-Houston and General Electric became the majority owner of the company.

Once BTH had the production licences for Thomson-Houston's products it started setting up factories in the English Midlands, with Rugby, Warwickshire chosen as the main location due to its good accessibility by rail and a local coal supply. In 1900 BTH bought Glebe Farm on the west side of Mill Road north of the railway in Rugby for £10,000, from Thos. Hunter & Co., to build their factory on it. The Mill Road factory opened in 1902 and made electric motors and generators. In the same year BTH obtained a licence to produce the Curtis steam turbine, which became one of the company's major products. In 1905 BTH made its first turbo-alternator and in 1911 got licences for all of General Electric's drawn-wire light bulbs, which it produced under the Mazda trademark.

For much of the late 19th century BTH competed for electrical generation and distribution contracts with British Westinghouse, mirroring the same company's battles in the US between their parents, General Electric and Westinghouse. The Power Act 1900 let BTH and British Westinghouse get new contracts to supply electric power to large areas.

As well as manufacturing, BTH also began to move into transport. On 22 December 1898 BTH opened the Cork Electric Tramways and Lighting Company, followed by the Isle of Thanet Electric Tramways on 4 April 1901 and the Chatham and District Light Railways Company in June 1902. In 1903 BTH was contracted to supply the electrical equipment for the Tyneside Electrics railway network in Newcastle upon Tyne. In 1907 BTH started a joint venture with Wolseley Motors to make petrol-electric buses and in 1909 the company supplied major coal-fired steam generators to London to power an electric trolley system that was being set up.

=== Consolidation ===
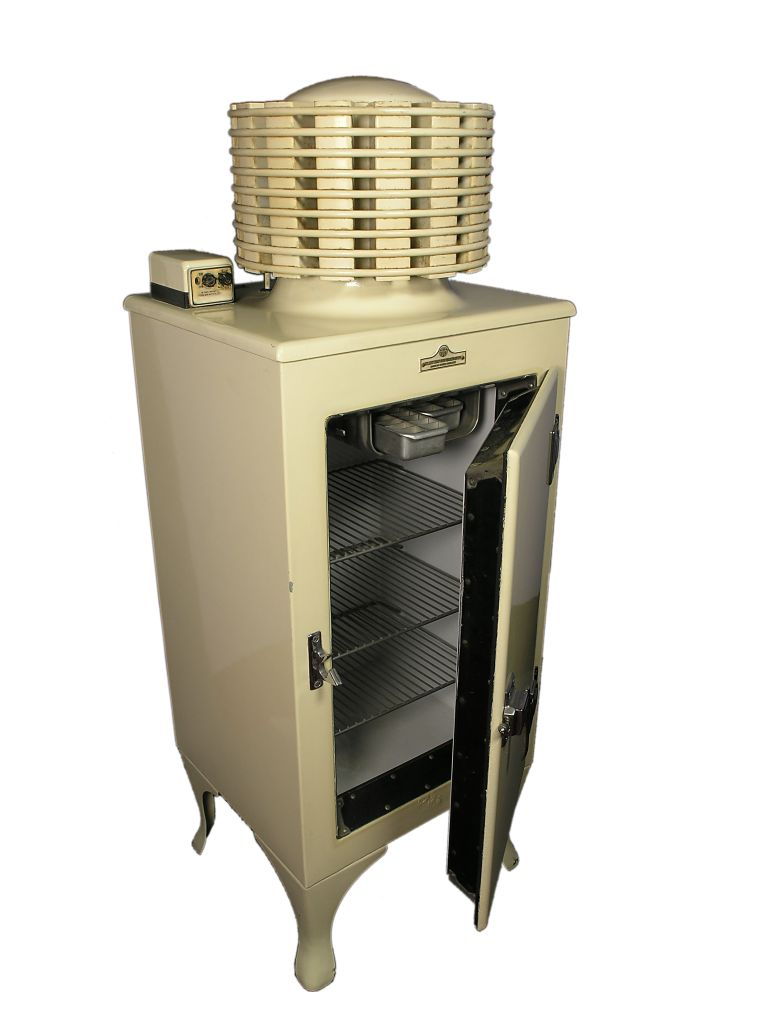
The 'Bee Hive' Refrigerator Birmingham Museums Trust

During World War I BTH expanded into naval electrical equipment, supplying the Royal Navy with various lighting, radio and signalling gear.

After the war BTH expanded dramatically, adding or expanding factories at Willesden, Birmingham, Chesterfield, and Lutterworth. It later had factories in Coventry, and in Larne in Northern Ireland. From 1924 to 1927 Demetrius Comino worked as an apprentice for BTH.

In 1926 Gerard Swope, president of General Electric, proposed that BTH, Westinghouse, General Electric Company (GEC) and English Electric should amalgamate. Lord Hirst of GEC was not interested in Swope's scheme, but a new holding company was formed, Associated Electrical Industries (AEI), and in 1928 AEI bought BTH and Metropolitan-Vickers (Metrovick). BTH had been in the process of buying the Edison and Swan Electric Light Company (Ediswan) and Ferguson, Pailin & Co, with AEI completing the purchases in 1929. Howard C. Levis, chairman of BTH from 1916, became chairman of AEI in 1928, retiring the following year.

In 1927 BTH sold the Chatham and District Light Railways Company to Maidstone and District Motor Services Ltd.

Throughout the 1920s BTH made turbo generators and motors for ocean liners including RMS Mooltan, RMS Viceroy of India, RMS Strathnaver and RMS Strathaird. The BTH factory in Northern Ireland made the turbo generator and propulsion motor for one of the world's first turbo-electric merchant ships, the banana boat SS San Benito, in 1921. This was followed by turbo generators and propulsion motors for the banana boats SS Musa, SS Platano and SS Darien.

The site at Rugby was also developed. Building 52, the research laboratory, was purpose-built in 1924. In the late 1920s AEI started to build buildings west of the footpath that runs north through the AEI site in Rugby to the Leicester Road, known in the area as the Black Path because it was surfaced with cinders, clinker and bitumen. During World War II BTH expanded north of the River Avon into the Boughton Road site to make magnetos for aircraft engines and other war products.

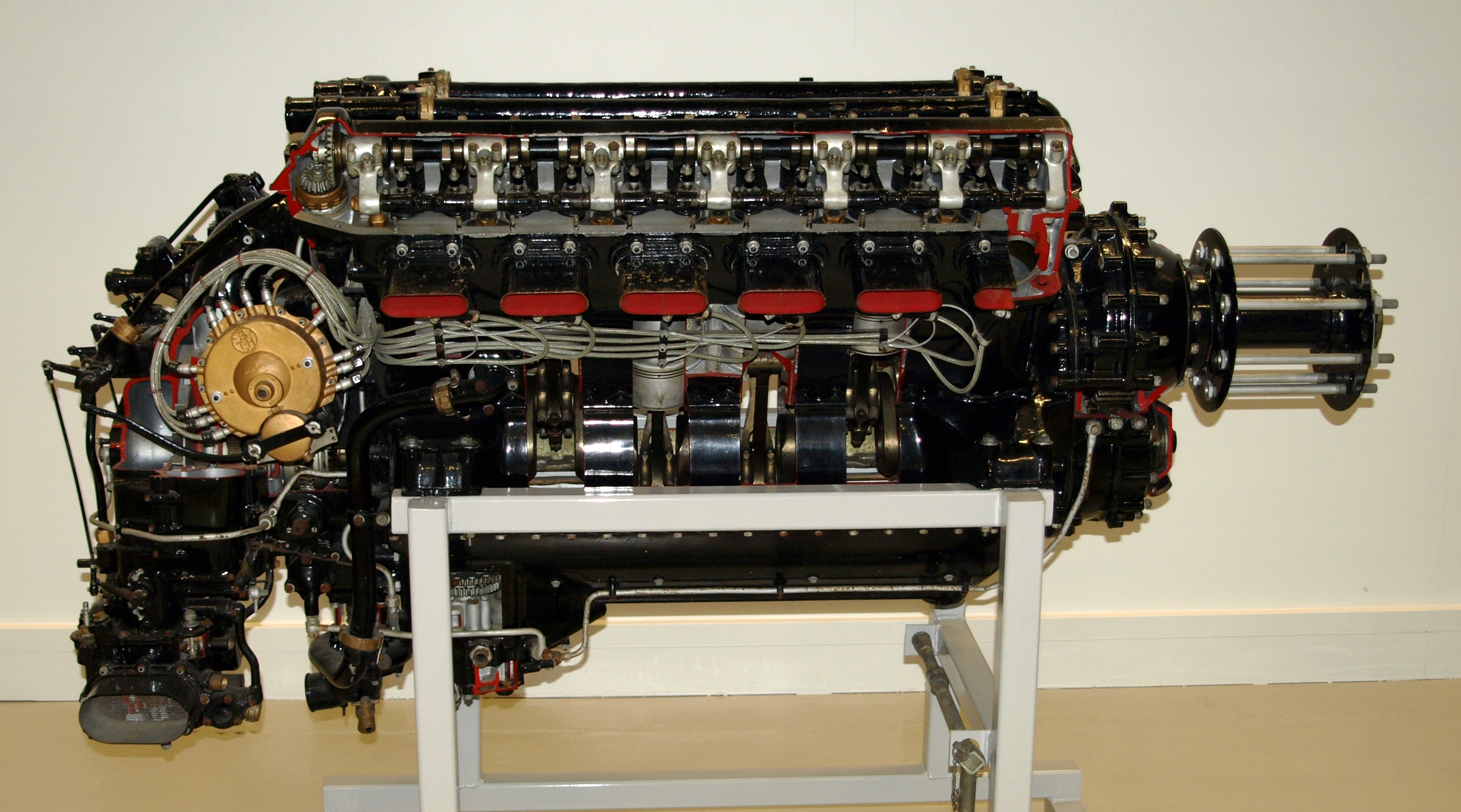
One of the two British Thomson-Houston distributors (the circular gold-coloured component) on a Rolls-Royce Kestrel aero engine

BTH had a major role in developing the world's first prototype jet engine, which was built by Frank Whittle's Power Jets company at the BTH works in Rugby in 1937. Development was later moved to the Lutterworth works, which were falling into disuse at the time. BTH's directors seemed sceptical of the design and offered little help, and in 1940 decided they were not really interested in making jet engines due to their commitment to electrical equipment. Rover was soon selected to make jet engines, but exchanged jet engine production with Rolls-Royce for making tank engines in 1943. In 1944 the Lutterworth Power Jets work was nationalised.

After World War II Oliver Lyttelton took over as chairman of AEI, and started a massive expansion. He returned as chairman between 1954 and 1963 and oversaw the opening of a massive new £8 million turbine works at Larne in 1957. In 1955 AEI acquired Siemens Brothers, which was merged with Edison Swan in 1957 to form the Siemens Edison Swan subsidiary. Rivalry with Metrovick intensified, particularly after BTH won the contract to build the new Buenos Aires Central Costanera S.A. power station, valued at £35 million, in 1957. Lyttelton continued to try to reduce this friction, leading to several unsuccessful reorganisations and slipping profits.

The postwar period saw continued development at BTH. The Hungarian scientist Dennis Gabor invented holography at the BTH site in Rugby in 1947, and in 1951 BTH supplied a 890 kW (1,200 bhp) gas turbine for the Auris, the first commercial ship to use gas-turbine propulsion. In 1955 BTH supplied 18 New Zealand DSC class locomotive Rolls-Royce powered locomotives for New Zealand Railways. The Ediswan trademark appeared on semiconductors in 1956 and the following year British Rail Class 15 diesel-electric locomotives were designed by BTH.

=== AEI (Associated Electrical Industries) ===
To try to cure internal political and efficiency problems, AEI stopped using the BTH and Metrovick names on 1 January 1960. This led to a huge decline in sales because no-one had heard of "AEI" before, and in turn, a massive drop in AEI's stock price. Continued attempts to streamline what were two separate management structures continued to fail, and by the mid-60s the entire AEI group was in financial trouble. The AEI name was first used on products in 1961. By 1967 AEI brands included Siemens Edison Swan, Hotpoint, Birlec and W.T. Henley.

The AEI research lab (building BR57) was built in 1960 at the Boughton Road site. At this point the size of the Rugby site peaked, with all of the company's land west of the Black Path built over.

Britain's first commercial nuclear power facility was built between 1956 and 1962 at Berkeley. This was followed by the building and commissioning of the 25 m Chilbolton radar dish at Chilbolton Observatory between 1963 and 1967.

=== GEC (General Electric Company) ===
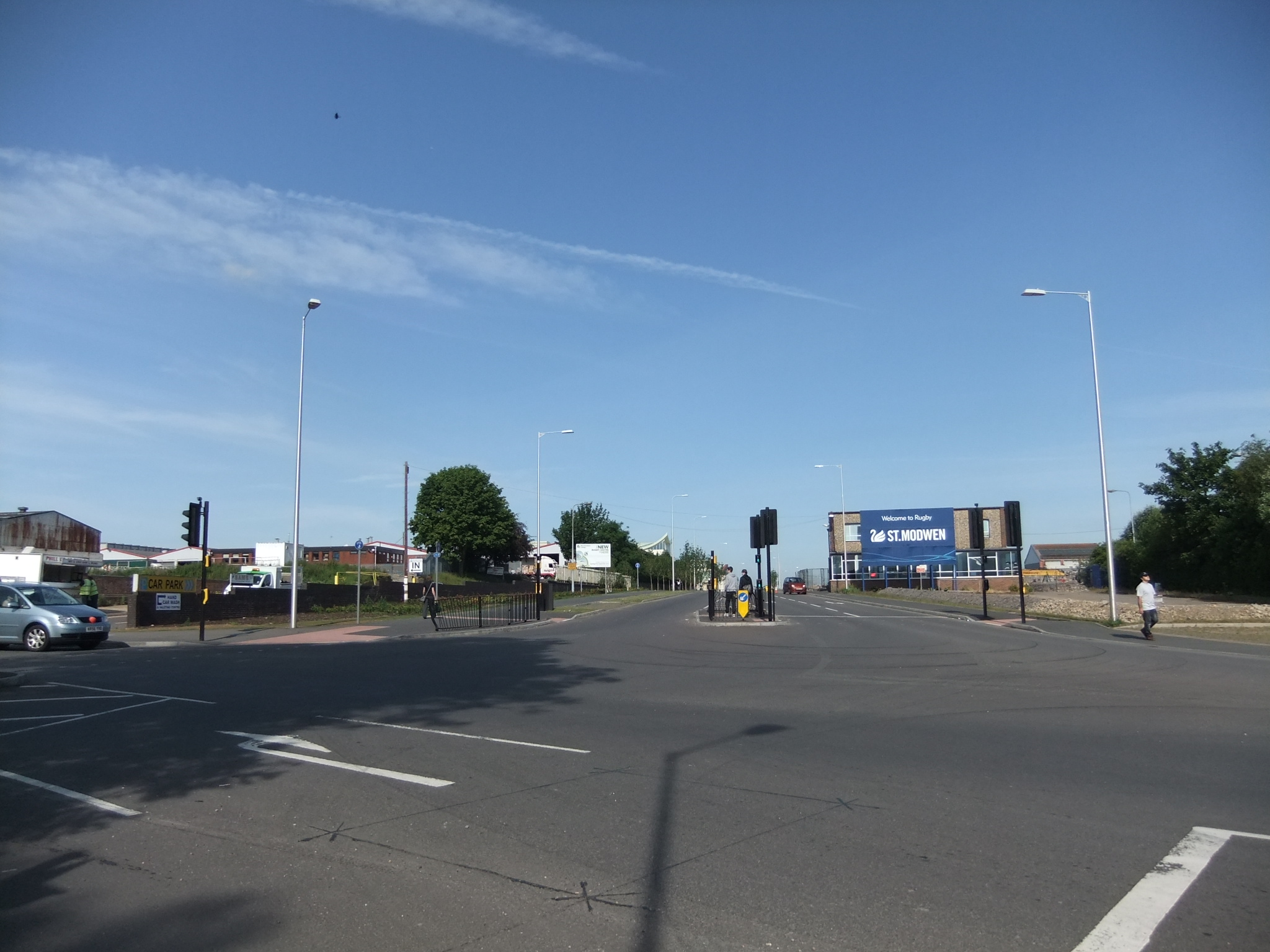
View across Mill Road, Rugby of where the east entrance of BTH was

In 1967 GEC bought AEI outright and became the UK's largest electrical group. A year later GEC acquired English Electric, prompting a series of mergers and reorganisations. GEC-AEI Electronics (Blackbird Road and New Parks, Leicester) was merged with Marconi's Radar Division (Chelmsford) and Elliott's Aerospace Control Division to form Marconi Radar Systems Ltd. (MRSL) in 1969.

In 1980 GEC Turbine Generators Ltd received The Queen's Award for Enterprise: International Trade (Export).

During the 1980s GEC Rugby shrank and buildings were demolished. The south part of the area to the west of the Black Path became a supermarket site. The Boughton Road site became several separate small firms. In 1989 GEC Rugby split into GEC Alsthom and Cegelec Projects, which were reunited in 1998 as Alstom.

The firm's clubhouse on Hillmorton Road was demolished in 2007, and the south edge of its surrounding sports field was encroached along for house building.

By 2011 the Mill Road factory site was greatly changed and included Rugby College. Quartzelec and Converteam worked on electrical engineering projects in some of the early BTH buildings, notably buildings 4, 193 and 140. A public road was built through the site between its former east and west gates. In 2012 Converteam was bought out by General Electric, therefore coming full circle back to when they were partnered in AEI. Converteam (now GE) produced rotating machines and used former-BTH equipment (machines) for running tests.

== Research ==
After World War II, AEI established a consolidated research effort at Aldermaston in Berkshire, England. The research centre was based at Aldermaston Court, a large stately home owned by AEI that had been requisitioned for military use in the war era.

== Preserved locomotives ==
One of the BTH-built batch of New Zealand Railways DSC class Bo-Bo shunters has been preserved and is used in industrial service, complete with original Rolls-Royce engines. The locomotive (DSC406) is the primary motive power at Alliance Ltd, Pukeuri, New Zealand. All the others were scrapped between 1986 and 1990.

Metro-Cammell-BTH diesel electric locomotive 4102 has been preserved in New South Wales, Australia.

Another BTH diesel locomotive is preserved in the UK This locomotive was purchased from Ford Dagenham by AEI and presented to the Kent and East Sussex Railway for preservation. See Rolling stock of the Kent & East Sussex Railway (heritage) for details.

== See also ==
- British Thomson-Houston Company War Memorial
- RMS Viceroy of India
