= United Fruit Company =

American fruit company (1899–1970)

- The house flag of the United Fruit Company

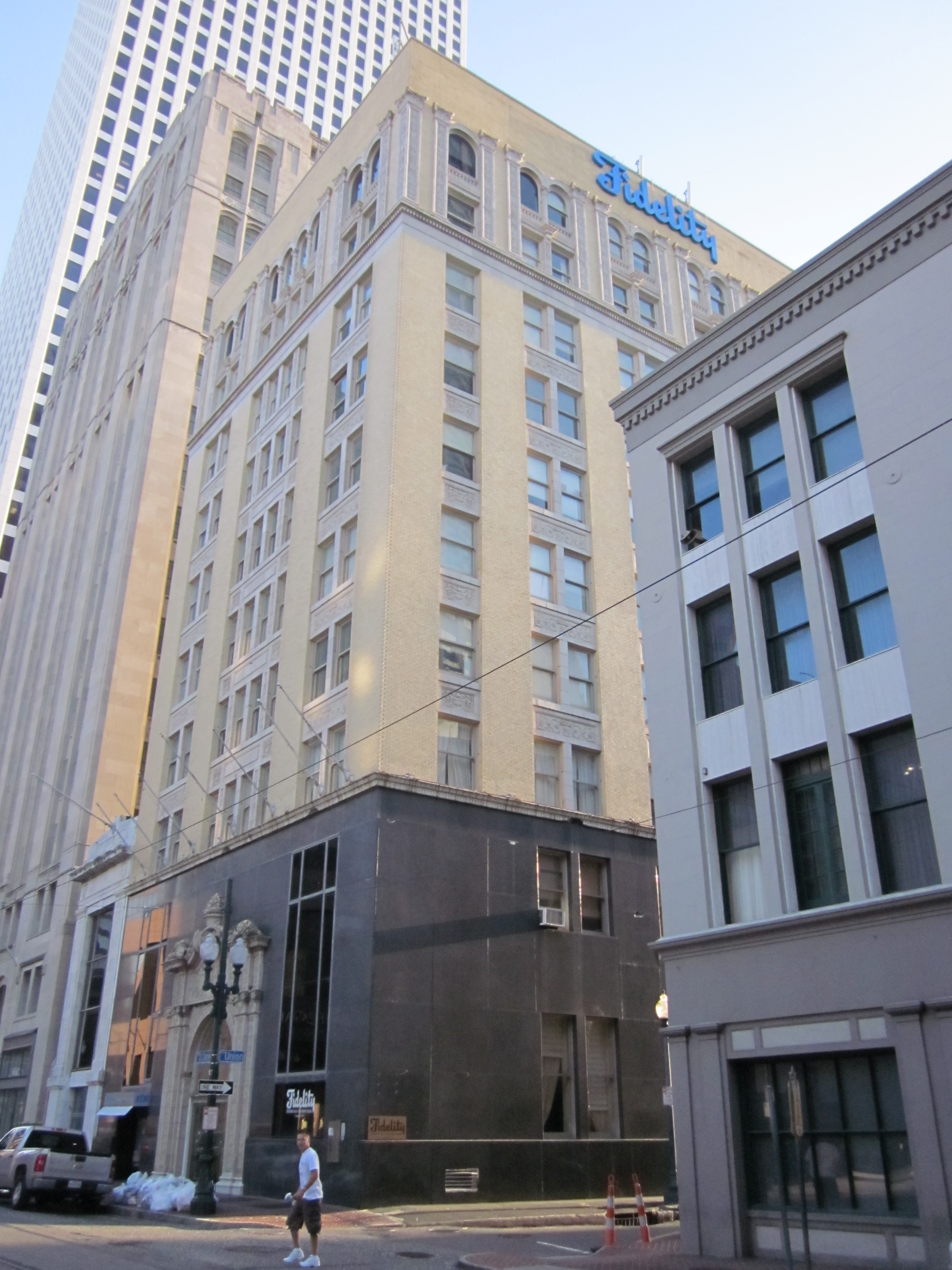
- The United Fruit Company's former headquarters at 321 St. Charles Avenue, New Orleans, Louisiana.
- Industry: Agriculture
- Predecessors: Boston Fruit Company; Tropical Trading & Transport
- Founded: March 30, 1899
- Founders: Minor C. Keith; Bradley Palmer; Andrew W. Preston
- Defunct: June 30, 1970 (as United Fruit Company); August 1984 (as United Brands)
- Fate: Merged with AMK to become United Brands Company
- Successor: Chiquita Brands International
- Area served: United States, Europe, Canada
- Products: Primarily bananas Also pineapples, grapefruits, and other fruits
- Production output: 49,845,000 bunches of bananas (stalks)
- Net income: $22.7 million (1927)
- Number of employees: 67,000 (1930)

The United Fruit Company (later the United Brands Company) was an American multinational corporation that traded in tropical fruit (primarily bananas) grown on Latin American plantations and sold in the United States and Europe. The company was formed in 1899 from the merger of the Boston Fruit Company with Minor C. Keith's banana-trading enterprises. It flourished in the early and mid-20th century, and it came to control vast territories and transportation networks in Central America, the Caribbean coast of Colombia, and the West Indies. Although it competed with the Standard Fruit Company (later Dole Food Company) for dominance in the international banana trade, it maintained a virtual monopoly in certain regions, some of which came to be called banana republics – such as Costa Rica, Honduras, and Guatemala.

United Fruit had a deep and long-lasting effect on the economic and political development of several Latin American countries. Critics often accused it of exploitative neocolonialism, and they described it as the archetypal example of the influence of a multinational corporation on the internal politics of the so-called banana republics. After a period of financial decline, United Fruit merged with Eli M. Black's AMK in 1970 to become the United Brands Company. In 1984, Carl Lindner Jr. transformed United Brands into the present-day Chiquita Brands International.

== Corporate history ==
=== Background ===
In 1871, U.S. railroad entrepreneur Henry Meiggs signed a contract with the government of Costa Rica to build a railroad connecting the capital city of San José to the port of Limón in the Caribbean. Meiggs was assisted in the project by his young nephew, Minor C. Keith, who took over Meiggs's business concerns in Costa Rica after his death in 1877. Keith began experimenting with the planting of bananas as a cheap source of food for his workers.

When the Costa Rican government defaulted on its payments in 1882, Keith had to borrow £1.2 million from London banks and from private investors to continue the difficult engineering project. In exchange for this and for renegotiating Costa Rica's own debt, in 1884, the administration of President Próspero Fernández Oreamuno agreed to give Keith 800,000 acres (3,200 km^{2}) of tax-free land along the railroad, plus a 99-year lease on the operation of the train route. The railroad was completed in 1890, but the flow of passengers proved insufficient to finance Keith's debt. However, the sale of bananas grown in his lands and transported first by train to Limón, then by ship to the United States, proved very lucrative. Keith eventually came to dominate the banana trade in Central America and along the Caribbean coast of Colombia.

=== United Fruit (1899–1970) ===
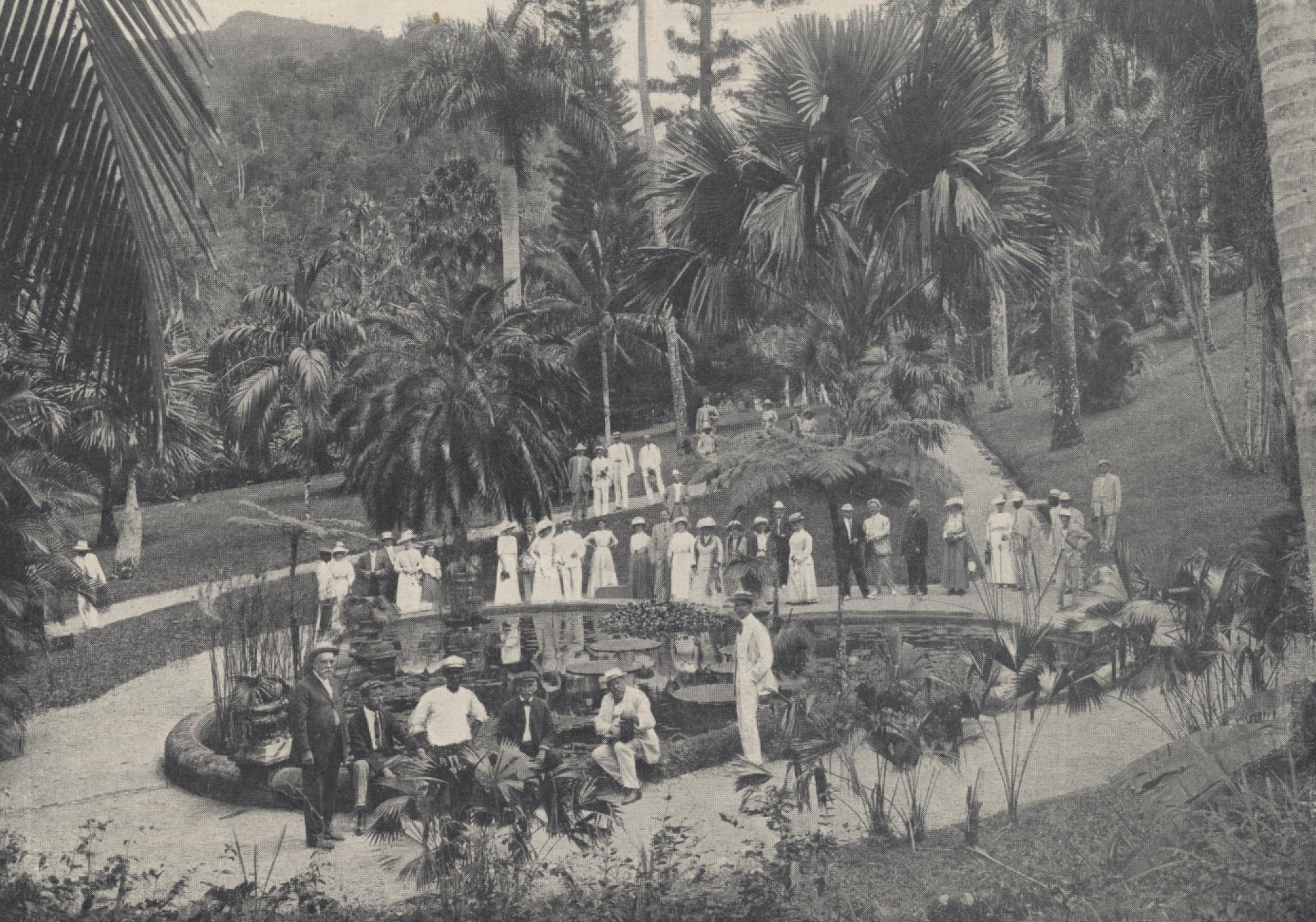
Banana company staff in Jamaica as part of United Fruit Company campaign to promote tourism

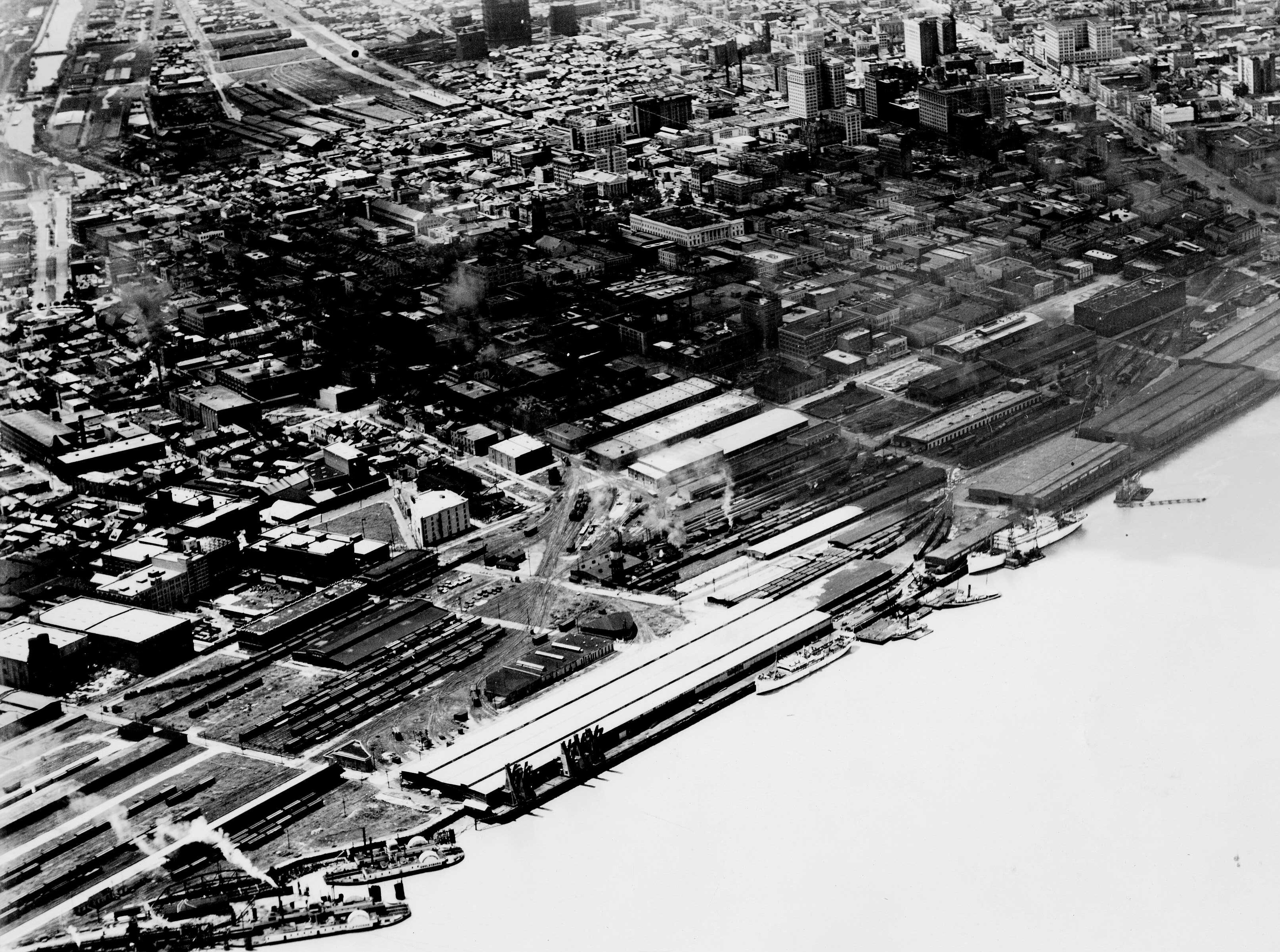
Docks of the United Fruit Company in New Orleans, 1922

In 1899, Keith lost $1.5 million when Hoadley and Co., a New York City broker, went bankrupt. He then traveled to Boston, Massachusetts, to participate in the merger of his banana trading company, Tropical Trading and Transport Company, with the rival Boston Fruit Company. Boston Fruit had been established by Lorenzo Dow Baker, a sailor who, in 1870, had bought his first bananas in Jamaica, and by Andrew W. Preston. Preston's lawyer, Bradley Palmer, had devised a scheme for the solution of the participants' cash flow problems and was in the process of implementing it. The merger formed the United Fruit Company, based in Boston, with Preston as president and Keith as vice-president. Palmer became a permanent member of the executive committee and for long periods of time the director. From a business point of view, Bradley Palmer was United Fruit. Preston brought to the partnership his plantations in the West Indies, a fleet of steamships, and his market in the U.S. Northeast. Keith brought his plantations and railroads in Central America and his market in the U.S. South and Southeast. At its founding, United Fruit was capitalized at $11.23 million. The company at Palmer's direction proceeded to buy, or buy a share in, 14 competitors, assuring them of 80% of the banana import business in the United States, then their main source of income. The company catapulted into financial success. Bradley Palmer overnight became a much-sought-after expert in business law, as well as a wealthy man. He later became a consultant to presidents and an adviser to Congress.

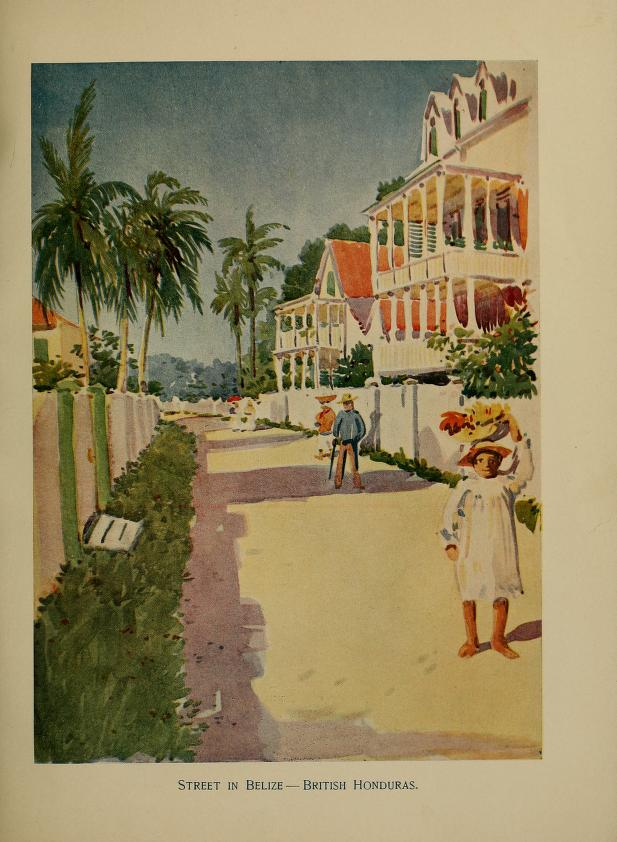
An illustration from The Golden Caribbean

In 1900, the United Fruit Company produced The Golden Caribbean: A Winter Visit to the Republics of Colombia, Costa Rica, Spanish Honduras, Belize and the Spanish Main – via Boston and New Orleans written and illustrated by Henry R. Blaney. The travel book featured landscapes and portraits of the inhabitants pertaining to the regions where the United Fruit Company possessed land. It also described the voyage of the United Fruit Company's steamer, and Blaney's descriptions and encounters of his travels.

In 1901, the government of Guatemala hired the United Fruit Company to manage the country's postal service, and in 1913 the United Fruit Company created the Tropical Radio and Telegraph Company. By 1930, it had absorbed more than 20 rival firms, acquiring a capital of $215 million and becoming the largest employer in Central America. In 1930, Sam Zemurray (nicknamed "Sam the Banana Man") sold his Cuyamel Fruit Company to United Fruit and retired from the fruit business. By then, the company held a major role in the national economies of several countries and eventually became a symbol of the exploitative export economy. This led to serious labor disputes by the Costa Rican peasants, involving more than 30 separate unions and 100,000 workers, in the 1934 Great Banana Strike, one of the most significant actions of the era by trade unions in Costa Rica.

By the 1930s the company owned 3.5 million acres (14,000 km^{2}) of land in Central America and the Caribbean and was the single largest land owner in Guatemala. Such holdings gave it great power over the governments of small countries. That was one of the factors that led to the coining of the phrase "banana republic".

In 1933, concerned that the company was mismanaged and that its market value had plunged, Zemurray staged a hostile takeover. Zemurray moved the company's headquarters to New Orleans, Louisiana, where he was based. United Fruit went on to prosper under Zemurray's management; Zemurray resigned as president of the company in 1951.

In addition to many other labor actions, the company faced two major strikes of workers in South and Central America, in Colombia in 1928 and the Great Banana Strike of 1934 in Costa Rica. The latter was an important step that would eventually lead to the formation of effective trade unions in Costa Rica since the company was required to sign a collective agreement with its workers in 1938. Labor laws in most banana production countries began to be tightened in the 1930s. United Fruit Company saw itself as being specifically targeted by the reforms, and often refused to negotiate with strikers, despite frequently being in violation of the new laws.

In 1952, the government of Guatemala began expropriating unused United Fruit Company land to landless peasants. The company responded by intensively lobbying the U.S. government to intervene and mounting a misinformation campaign to portray the Guatemalan government as communist. In 1954, the U.S. Central Intelligence Agency armed, funded, and trained a military force that deposed the democratically elected government of Guatemala and installed a pro-business military dictatorship.

In 1967, United Fruit Company acquired A&W Restaurants.

=== United Brands (1970–1984) ===
Corporate raider Eli M. Black bought 733,000 shares of United Fruit in 1968, becoming the company's largest shareholder. In June 1970, Black merged United Fruit with his own public company, AMK (owner of meat packer John Morrell), to create the United Brands Company. United Fruit had far less cash than Black had counted on, and Black's mismanagement led to United Brands becoming crippled with debt. The company's losses were exacerbated by Hurricane Fifi in 1974, which destroyed many banana plantations in Honduras. On February 3, 1975, Black committed suicide by jumping out a window from the 44th floor of the Pan Am Building in New York City. Later that year, the U.S. Securities and Exchange Commission exposed a scheme by United Brands (dubbed Bananagate) to bribe Honduran president Oswaldo López Arellano with $1.25 million, plus the promise of another $1.25 million upon the reduction of certain export taxes. Trading in United Brands stock was halted, and López was ousted in a military coup.

=== Chiquita Brands International ===
After Black's suicide, Cincinnati-based American Financial Group, one of billionaire Carl Lindner, Jr.'s companies, bought into United Brands. In August 1984, Lindner took control of the company and renamed it Chiquita Brands International. The headquarters was moved to Cincinnati in 1985. By 2019, the company's main offices left the United States and relocated to Switzerland.

Throughout most of its history, United Fruit's main competitor was the Standard Fruit Company, now the Dole Food Company.

== History in Latin America ==
The United Fruit Company (UFCO) owned huge tracts of land in the Caribbean lowlands. It also dominated regional transportation networks through its International Railways of Central America and its Great White Fleet of steamships. In addition, UFCO branched out in 1913 by creating the Tropical Radio and Telegraph Company. UFCO's policies of acquiring tax breaks and other benefits from host governments led to it building enclave economies in the regions, in which a company's investment is largely self-contained for its employees and overseas investors and the benefits of the export earnings are not shared with the host country.

One of the company's primary tactics for maintaining market dominance was to control the distribution of arable land. UFCO claimed that hurricanes, blight and other natural threats required them to hold extra land or reserve land. In practice, what this meant was that UFCO was able to prevent the government from distributing land to peasants who wanted a share of the banana trade. The fact that the UFCO relied so heavily on manipulating land use rights to maintain their market dominance had a number of long-term consequences for the region. For the company to maintain its unequal land holdings it often required government concessions. And this in turn meant that the company had to be politically involved in the region even though it was an American company. In fact, the heavy-handed involvement of the company in often-corrupt governments created the term "banana republic", which represents a servile dictatorship. The term "Banana Republic" was coined by American writer O. Henry.

=== Colombia ===
In the early to mid-20th century, the UFCO dominated the banana industry throughout the northern regions. The introduction of this multinational corporation meant that small farmers needed to be displaced. The UFCO acquired their land for their plantations in regions such as Urabá and Magdalena through deals with local elites and the government, which often displaced these small farmers living and working on the land. These farmers had little recourse in these land disputes, because of the close relationship that the UFCO had with the national government, the legal systems often favored corporate interests. Additionally, as peasants left haciendas to stake new land claims on public land that would be used for cultivation, however, land sharks and the Colombian government would encroach on their land with fabricated property titles to claim ownership of their land. This forced displacement of small farmers created resentment throughout Colombia which led to numerous resistance movements.

With the UFCO interfering with local issues throughout Colombia, the Liberal Party often fought back against the Conservative party for supporting the exploitation of multinational corporations towards the Colombian people. Not only did the majority of liberal Colombians have strong criticisms against tax and railway concessions from the UFCO, but it also led to Liberal newspapers expressing their opposition to their operations throughout the region. Many Colombians were upset that UFCO received numerous tax breaks from the Colombian government, as the UFCO didn't contribute to the national treasury while simultaneously profiting off of Colombian resources. The Liberal Party favored policies that promoted domestic industry and reduced foreign influence in Colombia, which is why they wanted to oust the UFCO's monopolistic practices. The opposition from the Liberal Party put pressure on the UFCO and its government backed allies to create a more equitable society, however their disregard for the Colombian people often led to labor strikes such as the Banana Massacre.

The expansion of banana plantations also changed everyday life in the Colombian banana zones. Plantation regions developed towns that were dominated by companies. Workers relied on commissaries for necessities. This system tied workers and their families to the plantations, making it difficult for them to leave employment even when wages were low or conditions were poor. As a result, entire communities became socially and economically dependent on the banana industry.

Not only was the UFCO known for monopolizing land and resources along with sidelining Colombian farmers, but their workers often experienced exploitative and inhumane labor conditions. From the 1960s to the 70s, UFCO plantation workers were subjected to grueling working schedules and a lack of basic amenities such as water and housing while living on company property. The majority of workers worked up to twenty hours each day, often leading to physical exhaustion and long-term health issues. The UFCO provided camps for workers to live in, however, the company exercised significant control over their workers' social conditions and access to resources. Lack of basic infrastructure such as clean drinking water and electricity meant that workers lived in unsanitary conditions, which could further exacerbate existing health issues. The UFCO perpetuated cycles of poverty and violence towards their workers, which led to violent repression ultimately leading to its demise in Colombia in the early 1970s.

==== Banana massacre ====
A strike by United Fruit workers broke out on 12 November 1928 near Santa Marta on the Caribbean coast of Colombia. On December 6, Colombian Army troops allegedly under the command of General Cortés Vargas opened fire on a crowd of strikers in the central square of Ciénaga. Estimates of the number of casualties vary from 47 to 2,000. The military justified this action stating that the strike was subversive, and its organizers were Communist revolutionaries. Congressman Jorge Eliécer Gaitán claimed that the army had acted under instructions from the United Fruit Company. The ensuing scandal contributed to President Miguel Abadía Méndez's Conservative Party being voted out of office in 1930, putting an end to 44 years of Conservative rule in Colombia. The first novel of Álvaro Cepeda Samudio, La Casa Grande, focuses on this event, and the author himself grew up in close proximity to the incident. The climax of García Márquez's novel One Hundred Years of Solitude is based on the events in Ciénaga.

General Cortés Vargas issued the order to shoot, arguing later that he had done so because of information that US boats were poised to land troops on Colombian coasts to defend American personnel and the interests of the United Fruit Company. Vargas issued the order so the United States would not invade Colombia.

The telegram from Bogotá Embassy to the U.S. Secretary of State, dated December 5, 1928, stated:

I have been following Santa Marta fruit strike through United Fruit Company representative here; also through Minister of Foreign Affairs who on Saturday told me government would send additional troops and would arrest all strike leaders and transport them to prison at Cartagena; that government would give adequate protection to American interests involved.

The telegram from Bogotá Embassy to Secretary of State, date December 7, 1928, stated:

Situation outside Santa Marta City unquestionably very serious: outside zone is in revolt; military who have orders 'not to spare ammunition' have already killed and wounded about fifty strikers. Government now talks of general offensive against strikers as soon as all troopships now on the way arrive early next week.

The dispatch from U.S. Bogotá Embassy to the U.S. Secretary of State, dated December 29, 1928, stated:

I have the honor to report that the legal advisor of the United Fruit Company here in Bogotá stated yesterday that the total number of strikers killed by the Colombian military authorities during the recent disturbance reached between five and six hundred; while the number of soldiers killed was one.

The dispatch from the U.S. embassy to the U.S. Secretary of State, dated January 16, 1929, stated:

I have the honor to report that the Bogotá representative of the United Fruit Company told me yesterday that the total number of strikers killed by the Colombian military exceeded one thousand.

The Banana massacre is said to be one of the main events that preceded the Bogotazo, the subsequent era of violence known as La Violencia, and the guerrillas who developed in the bipartisan National Front period, creating the ongoing armed conflict in Colombia.

==== Aiding and abetting a terrorist organization ====
In March 2007 Chiquita Brands pleaded guilty in a United States Federal court to aiding and abetting a terrorist organization, when it admitted to the payment of more than $1.7 million to the United Self-Defense Forces of Colombia (AUC), a group that the United States has labeled a terrorist organization since 2001. Under a plea agreement, Chiquita Brands agreed to pay $25 million in restitution and damages to the families of victims of the AUC. The AUC had been paid to protect the company's interest in the region.

In addition to monetary payments, Chiquita has also been accused of smuggling weapons (3,000 AK-47s) to the AUC and in assisting the AUC in smuggling drugs to Europe. Chiquita Brands admitted that they paid AUC operatives to silence union organizers and intimidate farmers into selling only to Chiquita. In the plea agreement, the Colombian government let Chiquita Brands keep the names of U.S. Citizens who brokered this agreement with the AUC secret, in exchange for relief to 390 families.

Despite calls from Colombian authorities and human rights organizations to extradite the U.S. citizens responsible for war crimes and aiding a terrorist organization, the U.S. Department of Justice has refused to grant the request, citing 'conflicts of law'. As with other high-profile cases involving wrongdoing by American companies abroad, the U.S. State Department and the U.S. Department of Justice are very careful to hand over any American citizen to be tried under another country's legal system, so for the time being Chiquita Brands International avoided a catastrophic scandal, and instead walked away with a humiliating defeat in court and eight of its employees fired.

=== Costa Rica ===
In the 20th century, many parts of Latin America were not positively operated and invested in compared to the region of Costa Rica. The United Fruit Company, according to researchers, made positive impacts in the region that continued past the bankruptcy and ceasing of production in 1984.

Since 1880 with the first initial U.S. investment in 4% of the country's territory, the UFCO grew in Costa Rica to develop around 7% of their labor force. With a growing labor force and plantations expanding, camps for farmers and families emerged. With the emergence of the workforce came the construction of commissaries, schools, electric plants, sewage systems, hospitals, and recreation facilities all funded by the UFCO.

According to Yale Insights, the impact of the infrastructure still persists today in astonishing numbers. In 1973, households living within the boundaries of UFCO were 26% less likely to be poor compared to outside households. A most recent research statistic in 2011 states that only 63% of the poverty gap had closed by 2011. The impact of the UFCO investment in capital among families had statistically paid off as outside work options had around a 1% increase in probability of being poor in 2011 since 1973 compared to the 0.73% lower probability on a UFCO location.

The development of banana plantations in Costa Rica also had a huge social and environmental impact on the local communities. The need to produce large quantities of bananas compelled massive clearings of the tropical forests along the Caribbean lowlands, heavily altering the ecosystem. Migration to other regions of Central America was also a major contributor to plantation agriculture. This formed ethnically diverse, though economically divided societies in places like Limón. Although the banana industry supported many people by offering them jobs, it linked the lives of many local people to the success of the plantations owned by foreigners and the prices in the international banana market.

=== Cuba ===
By the early 20th century, the UFCO began its operations in Cuba by controlling large tracts of land and influencing local governance and labor markets. In the early 1920s, the UFCO established its central hub for operations in the Cuban city of Banes where the banana plantations were run by the antillano population: migrants from the British Caribbean, specifically from Jamaica and Haiti. With the introduction of the UFCO in Banes, the city was transformed socially and economically, due to an increase in employment, better infrastructure, and more law enforcement.

The United Fruit Company also had an impact on local communities in Cuba, especially in the eastern province of Oriente. The company obtained massive land areas and developed farming facilities in the area. New plantation work attracted masses of workers, including immigrant workers from neighboring countries.

Company holdings in Cuba, which included sugar mills in the Oriente region of the island, were expropriated by the 1959 revolutionary government led by Fidel Castro. By April 1960 Castro was accusing the company of aiding Cuban exiles and supporters of former leader Fulgencio Batista in initiating a seaborne invasion of Cuba directed from the United States. Castro warned the U.S. that "Cuba is not another Guatemala" in one of many combative diplomatic exchanges before the U.S. organized the failed Bay of Pigs Invasion of 1961.

=== Guatemala ===
Although UFCO sometimes promoted the development of the nations where it operated, its long-term effects on their economy and infrastructure were often devastating. In Central America, the Company built extensive railroads and ports, provided employment and transportation, and created numerous schools for the people who lived and worked on Company land. On the other hand, it allowed vast tracts of land under its ownership to remain uncultivated and, in Guatemala and elsewhere, it discouraged the government from building highways, which would have lessened the profitable transportation monopoly of the railroads under its control. UFCO also destroyed at least one of those railroads upon leaving its area of operation.

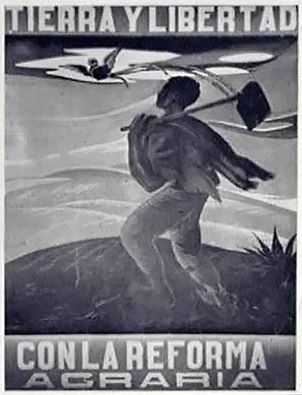
When President Jacobo Árbenz Guzmán attempted a redistribution of land, he was overthrown in the 1954 Guatemalan coup d'état

The expansion of banana plantations in Guatemala also affected Indigenous Maya communities who had lived in the regions where plantations were established. Groups such as the Qʼeqchiʼ Maya experienced displacement and land loss as plantations expanded during the late nineteenth and early twentieth centuries. New laws allowed private owners and foreign companies to acquire land that had previously been held communally by Indigenous communities, furthering the consolidation of land under private ownership.

In 1954, the Guatemalan government of Colonel Jacobo Árbenz, elected in 1950, was toppled by forces led by Colonel Carlos Castillo Armas who invaded from Honduras. Commissioned by the Eisenhower administration, this military operation was armed, trained and organized by the U.S. Central Intelligence Agency (see Operation PBSuccess). The directors of United Fruit Company (UFCO) had lobbied to convince the Truman and Eisenhower administrations that Colonel Árbenz intended to align Guatemala with the Eastern Bloc. Besides the disputed issue of Árbenz's allegiance to communism, UFCO was being threatened by the Árbenz government's agrarian reform legislation and new Labor Code. UFCO was the largest landowner and employer in Guatemala, and the Árbenz government's land reform program included the expropriation of 40% of UFCO land. U.S. officials had little proof to back their claims of a growing communist threat in Guatemala; however, the relationship between the Eisenhower administration and UFCO demonstrated the influence of corporate interest on U.S. foreign policy. United States Secretary of State John Foster Dulles, an avowed opponent of communism, was also a member of the law firm, Sullivan and Cromwell, which had represented United Fruit. Many individuals who directly influenced U.S. policy in Guatemala in the 1950s also had direct ties to UFCO.

After the overthrow of Árbenz, a military dictatorship was established under Carlos Castillo Armas. Soon after coming to power, the new government launched a concerted campaign against trade unionists, in which some of the most severe violence was directed at workers on the plantations of the United Fruit Company.

Despite UFCO's government connections and conflicts of interest, the overthrow of Árbenz failed to benefit the company. Its stock market value declined along with its profit margin. The Eisenhower administration proceeded with antitrust action against the company, which forced it to divest in 1958. In 1972, the company sold off the last of its Guatemalan holdings after over a decade of decline.

=== Honduras ===
==== Attempt at state capture ====
Following the Honduran declaration of independence in 1838 from the Central American Federation, Honduras was in a state of economic and political strife due to constant conflict with neighboring countries for territorial expansion and control. Liberal President Marco Aurelio Soto (1876–1883) saw instating the Agrarian Law of 1877 as a way to make Honduras more appealing to international companies looking to invest capital into a promising host export-driven economy. The Agrarian Law would grant foreign multinational companies leniency in tax regulations along with other financial incentives. Acquiring the first railroad concession from liberal President Miguel R. Dávila in 1910, the Vaccaro brothers and Company helped set the foundation on which the banana republic would struggle to balance and regulate the relationships between American capitalism and Honduran politics.

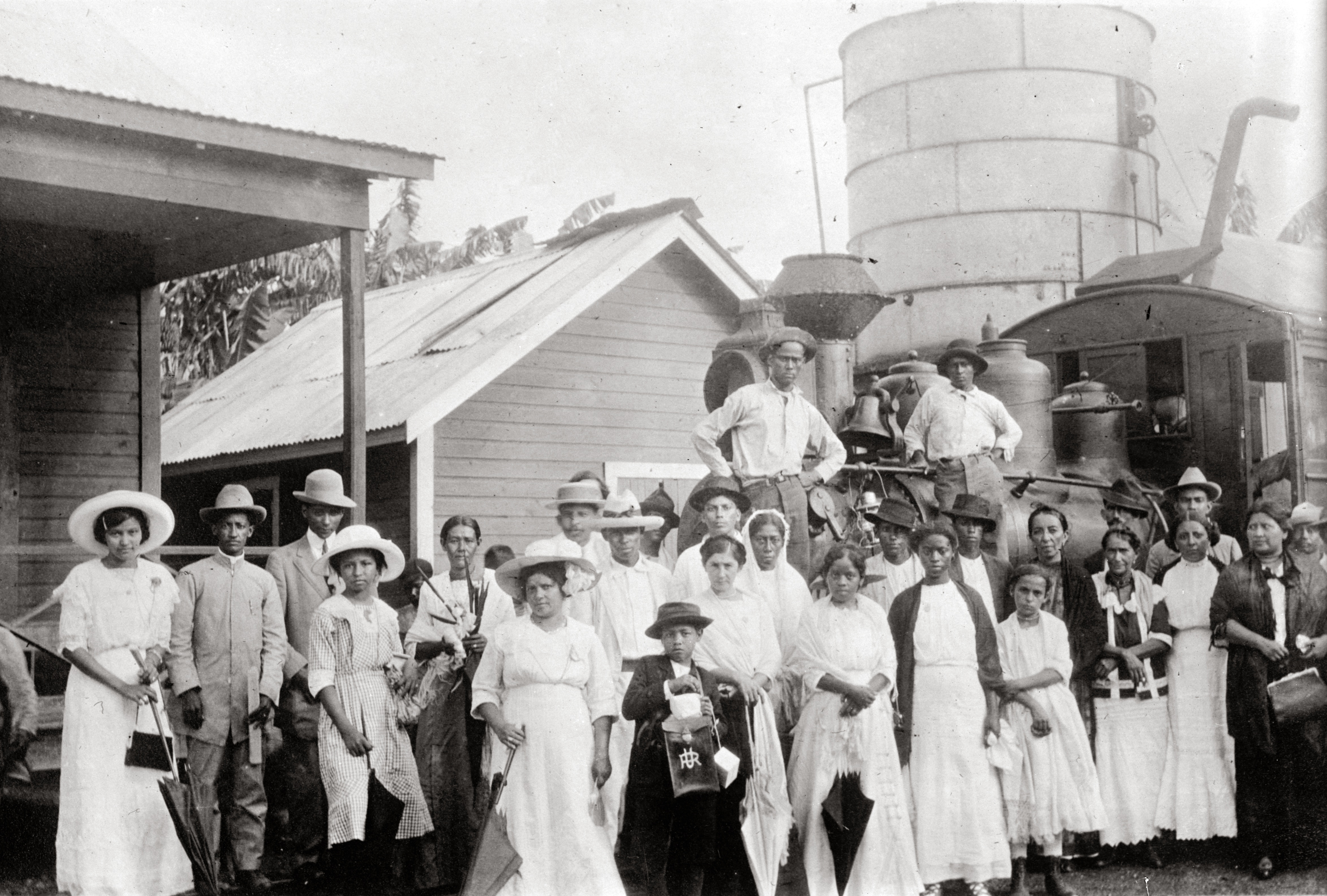
Main railroad station in La Ceiba, Honduras, in 1920

Samuel Zemurray, a small-sized American banana entrepreneur, rose to be another contender looking to invest in the Honduran agricultural trade. In New Orleans, Zemurray found himself strategizing with the newly exiled General Manuel Bonilla (nationalist ex-president of Honduras 1903–1907, 1912–1913) and fomented a coup d'état against President Dávila. On Christmas Eve, December 1910, in clear opposition of the Dávila administration, Samuel Zemurray, U.S. General Lee Christmas, and Honduran General Manuel Bonilla boarded the yacht "Hornet", formerly known as the USS Hornet and recently purchased by Zemurray in New Orleans. With a gang of New Orleans mercenaries and plenty of arms and ammunition, they sailed to Roatán to attack, then seize the northern Honduran ports of Trujillo and La Ceiba. Unbeknownst to Zemurray, he was being watched by the US Secret Service. Having captured the aging fort at Roatán, he quickly sold the Hornet to a Honduran straw buyer on the island to avoid falling foul of the Neutrality Act. After successfully attacking the port of Trujillo, the Hornet unexpectedly encountered the U.S. gunboat Tacoma and was towed back to New Orleans. The nascent revolution continued apace, Zemurray's media contacts having spread the word in advance. President Dávila was forced to step down, with Francisco Bertrand becoming interim president until General Bonilla handily won the November 1911 Honduran presidential elections.

In 1912, General Bonilla quickly granted the second railroad concession to the newly incorporated Cuyamel Fruit Company owned by Zemurray. The period of some of these exclusive railroad land concessions was up to 99 years. The first railroad concession leased the national railroad of Honduras to the Vaccaro Bros. and Co. (once Standard Fruit Company and currently Dole Food Company). Zemurray granted his concession to the Tela Railroad Company—another division within his own company. Cuyamel Fruit Company's concession would also be awarded to the Tela Railroad Company. United Fruit Company (currently Chiquita Brands International) would partner with President Bonilla in the exchange of access and control of Honduran natural resources plus tax and financial incentives. In return, President Bonilla would receive cooperation, protection and a substantial amount of U.S. capital to build a progressive infrastructure in Honduras.

==== Banana multinational establishment and expansion ====
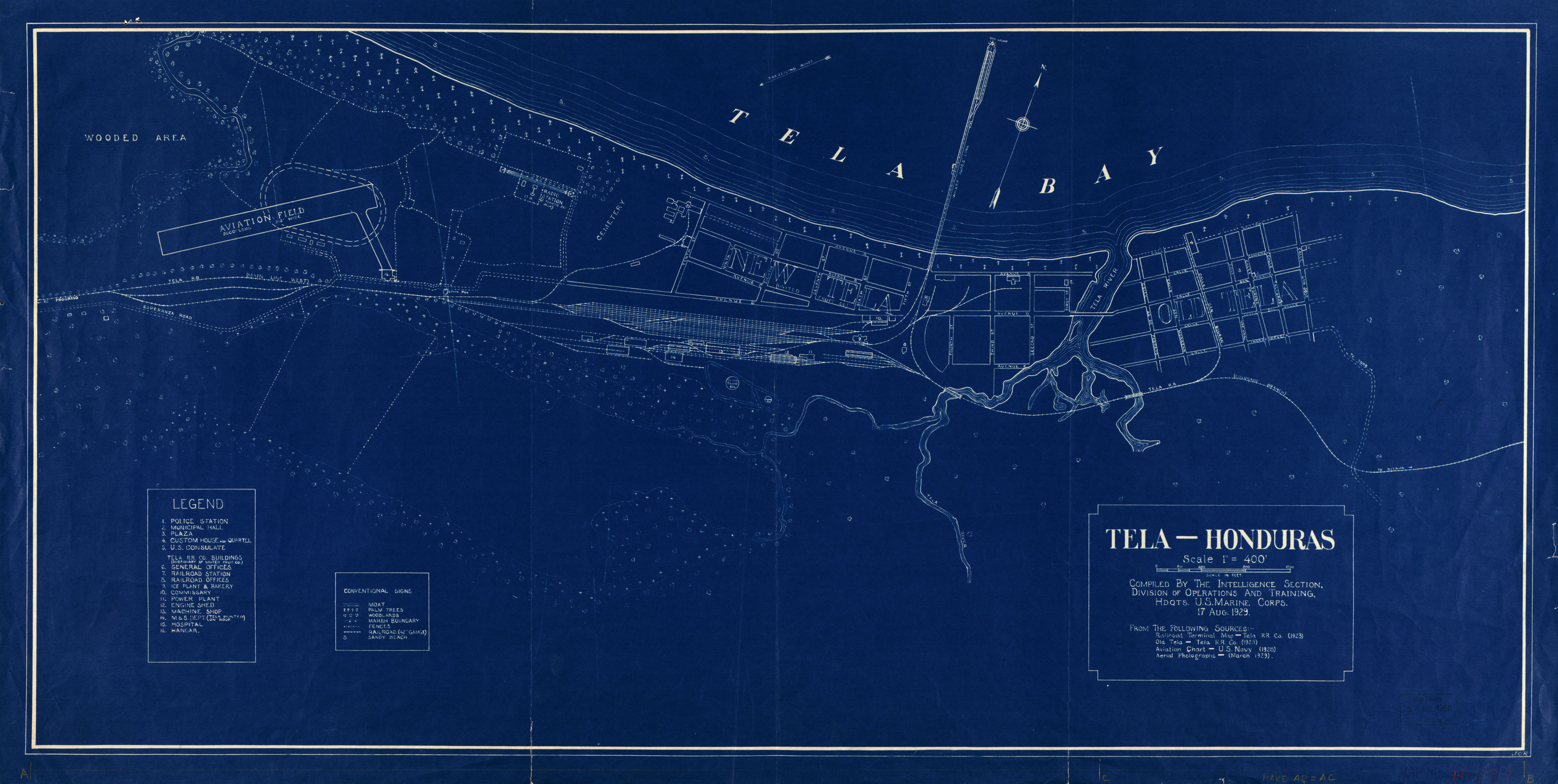
1929 map of the town of Tela

The granting of land ownership in exchange for the railroad concession started the first official competitive market for bananas and giving birth to the banana republic. Cuyamel Fruit Company and the Vaccaro Bros. and Co. would become known as being multinational enterprises. Bringing western modernization and industrialization to the welcoming Honduran nation. All the while Honduran bureaucrats would continue to take away the indigenous communal lands to trade for capital investment contracts as well as neglect the fair rights of Honduran laborers. After the peak of the banana republic era, resistance eventually began to grow on the part of small-scale producers and production laborers, due to the exponential rate in growth of the wealth gap as well as the collusion between the profiting Honduran government officials and the U.S. fruit companies (United Fruit Co., Standard Fruit Co., Cuyamel Fruit Co.) versus the Honduran working and poor classes.

Due to the exclusivity of the land concessions and lack of official ownership documentation, Honduran producers and experienced laborers were left with two options to regain these lands—dominio util or dominio pleno. Dominio util—meaning the land was intended to be developed for the greater good of the public with a possibility of being the granted "full private ownership" versus dominio pleno was the immediate granting of full private ownership with the right to sell. Based on the 1898 Honduran agrarian law, without being sanctioned the right their communal lands, Honduran villages and towns could only regain these lands if granted by the Honduran government or in some cases it was permitted by U.S. companies, such as United Fruit Co., to create long-term contracts with independent producers on devastatingly diseased infested districts. Even once granted land concessions, many were so severely contaminated with either the Panaman, moko, or sigatoka, that it would have to reduce the acreage used and the amount produced or changed the crop being produced. Additionally, accusations were reported of the Tela Railroad Company placing intense requirements, demanding exclusivity in distribution, and unjustly denying crops produced by small-scale farmers because they were deemed "inadequate". Compromise was attempted between small-scale fruit producers and the multinationals enterprises but were never reached and resulted in local resistance.

The U.S. fruit corporations were choosing rural agriculture lands in Northern Honduras, specifically using the new railroad system for their proximity to major port cities of Puerto Cortes, Tela, La Ceiba, and Trujillo as the main access points of transport for shipments designated back to the United States and Europe. To get an understanding of the dramatic increase in amount of bananas being exported, firstly "in the Atlantida, the Vaccaro Brothers (Standard Fruit) oversaw the construction of 155 kilometers of railroad between 1910 and 1915...the expansion of the railroad led to a concomitant rise exports, from 2.7 million bunches in 1913 to 5.5 million in 1919." Standard Fruit, Cuyamel, and the United Fruit Co. combined surpassed past profit performances, "In 1929 a record 29 million bunches left Honduran shores, a volume that exceeded the combined exports of Colombia, Costa Rica, Guatemala, and Panama."

==== Agriculture research and training ====
Early 20th-century Honduras agricultural brochure

Samuel Zemurray employed agronomists, botanists, and horticulturists to aid in research studies for United Fruit in their time of crisis, as early as 1915, when the Panama disease first inhabited crops. Funding specialized studies to treat Panama disease and supporting the publishing of such findings throughout the 1920s–1930s, Zemurray consistently was an advocate for agricultural research and education. This was first observed when Zemurray funded the first research station of Lancetilla in Tela, Honduras in 1926 and led by Dr. Wilson Popenoe.

Zemurray also founded the Zamorano Pan-American Agricultural School (Escuela Agricola Panamericana) in 1941 with Dr. Popenoe as the head agronomist. There were certain requirements before a student could be accepted into the fully paid for 3-year program including additional expenses (room and board, clothing, food, stc), a few being a male between the ages of 18 and 21, 6 years of elementary education, plus an additional 2 years of secondary. Zemurray, established a policy where, "The School is not for the training or improvement of the company's own personnel, but represents an outright and disinterested contribution to the improvement of agriculture in Spanish America...This was one way in which the United Fruit Company undertook to discharge its obligation of social responsibility in those countries in which it operates-and even to help others." Zemurray was so intensely adamant in his policy, that students were not allowed to become employees at the United Fruit Company post-graduation.

==== Labor health risks ====
Both United Fruit Company production laborers and their fellow railroad workers from the Tela Railroad Company were not only at constant risk from long periods of chemical exposure in the intense tropical environment, but there was a possibility of contracting malaria and yellow fever from mosquito bites or inhale the airborne bacteria of tuberculosis from infected victims.

In 1950, Prisión Verde ("The Green Prison"), written by Ramón Amaya Amador, a leading member of the Honduran Communist Party, exposed the injustices of working and living conditions on banana plantations with the story of Martin Samayoa, a former Bordeaux spray applicator. This literary piece is the personal account of everyday life, as an applicator, and the experienced as well as witnessed injustices pre/post-exposure to the toxic chemicals within these fungicidal treatments and insecticides. The Bordeaux spray in particular is a blue-green color and many sources referring to its usage usually bring to light the apparent identification of those susceptible to copper toxicity based on their appearance after working. For example, Pericos ("parakeets") was the nickname given to spray workers in Puerto Rico because of the blue-green coloring left on their clothing after a full day of spraying. In 1969, there was only one documented case of vineyard workers being studied in Portugal as they worked with the Bordeaux spray whom all suffered similar health symptoms and biopsied to find blue-green residue within the victim's lungs.

Little evidence was collected in the 1930s–1960s by either the American or Honduran officials to address these acute, chronic, and deadly effects and illnesses warranted from the chemical exposure such as tuberculosis, long-term respiratory problems, weight loss, infertility, cancer, and death. Many laborers were discouraged to voice the pain caused from physical injustices that occurred from the chemicals penetrating their skin or by inhalation from fungicide fumes in long labor-intensive hours spraying the applications. Without any specialized health care targeted to cure these unabating ailments and little to no compensation of workers who did become gravely ill. Bringing awareness to such matters especially against major powers such as United Fruit Co. amongst other multinational companies and the involved national governments would be feat for any single man/ woman to prove and demand for change. That is until the legalization of labor unionization and organized resistance.

==== Resistance and reformation ====
Labor resistance, although was most progressive in the 1950s to the 1960s, there has been a consistent presence of abrasiveness towards multinational enterprises such as United Fruit. General Bonilla's choice to approve the concessions without demanding the establishment of fair labor rights and market price, nor enforce a comprise between small-scale fruit producers and the conglomerate of U.S. fruit enterprises would create the foundation in which strife would ensue from political, economic, and natural challenges. The first push for resistance began from the labor movement, leading into the Honduran government's turn towards nationalism, compliance with Honduran land and labor reformations (1954–1974)*, and the severance of U.S. multinational support in all host countries' governmental affairs (1974–1976)*. As United Fruit battles with Honduran oppositions, they also fight similar battles with the other host Central American nations, let alone their own Great Depression and the rising threat of communism.

==== Labor unionization ====
From 1900 to 1945, the power and economic hegemony allotted to the American multinational corporations by host countries was designed to bring nations such as Honduras out of foreign debt and economic turmoil all the while decreasing the expenses of production, increasing the levels of efficiency and profit, and thriving in a tariff-free economic system. However, the growing demand for bananas surpassed the supply because of challenges such as invasive fruit diseases (Panama, sigtaoka, and moko) plus human illnesses from extreme working conditions (chemical toxicity and communicable diseases).

Laborers began to organize, protest, and expose the conditions in what they were suffering from at the location of their division. Small-scale fruit producers would also join the opposition to regain equality in the market economy and push for the redistribution of the taken communal lands sold to American multinational corporations. Referencing to the Honduran administrations from 1945 to 1954, business historian Marcelo Bucheli interpreted their acts of collusion and stated "The dictators helped United Fruit's business by creating a system with little or no social reform, and in return United Fruit helped them remain in power". As the rise of dictatorship flourished under Tiburcio Carías Andino's national administration (1933–1949) and prevailed for 16 years until it was passed onto nationalist President Juan Manuel Gálvez (a former lawyer for the United Fruit Company).

The General Strike of 1954 in Tela, Honduras was largest organized labor opposition against the United Fruit company. However, it did involve the laborers from United Fruit, Standard Fruit, along with industrial workers from San Pedro Sula. Honduran laborers were demanding fair pay, economic rights, checked national authority, and eradication of imperialist capitalism. The total number of protesters was estimated at greater than 40,000. On the 69th day, an agreement was made between United Fruit and the mass of protesters leading to the end of the General Strike. Under the administration of Galvez (1949–1954) strides were taken to put into effect the negotiated improvements of workers' rights. Honduran laborers gained the right for shorter workdays, paid holidays, limited employee responsibility for injuries, the improvement of employment regulation over women and children, and the legalization of unionization. In the summer of 1954 the strike ended, yet the demand for economic nationalism and social reform was just beginning to gain even more momentum going into the 1960s–1970s.

==== Nationalist movement ====
By legalizing unionization, the large mass of laborers were able to organize and act on the influences of nationalist movement, communist ideology, and becomes allies of the communist party. As like in the neighboring nation of Cuba and the rise communism led by Fidel Castro, the fight for nationalism spread to other Latin American nations and ultimately led to a regional revolution. Americans struggled to maintain control and protect their capital investment while building tensions grew between America, the communist, and nationalist parties.

The 1970s energy crisis was a period where petroleum production reached its peak, causing an inflation in price, leading to petroleum shortages, and a 10-year economic battle. Ultimately the United Fruit Company, among other multinational fruit enterprises, would attempt to recover capital lost due to the oil crisis through the Latin American nations. The United Fruit's plan for recovery would ensue by increasing taxation and reestablishing exclusivity contracts with small-scale farmers. "The crisis forced local governments to realign themselves and follow protectionist policies" (Bulmer-Thomas, 1987). The fight to not lose their control over Honduras and other sister host nations to communism failed, yet the nature of their relationship did change to where the national government had the higher authority and control.

==== Hurricane Fifi ====
In September 1974, Hurricane Fifi made landfall in Honduras as a Category 2 hurricane. The northern coastal region of Honduras was ravaged by this hurricane, especially the United Fruit Company's banana plantations which were flattened by high winds and flooded up to thirty feet of storm surge. Banana plants were vulnerable to flooding and high winds, which uprooted and destroyed these plantations, significantly reducing the company's productivity in Honduras. The hurricane caused extensive damage to the infrastructure such as roads, railways, and ports which all supported banana production since they were used to transport bananas to export markets. Rebuilding this infrastructure added to the economic burden on the company, which its demise in 1970 only worsened.

==== Social welfare programs for employees of United Fruit Company ====
U.S. food corporations, such as United Fruit established community services and facilitates for mass headquartered (production) divisions, settlements of banana plantations throughout their partnered host countries such in the Honduran cities of Puerto Cortes, El Progreso, La Ceiba, San Pedro Sula, Tela, and Trujillo.) Because of the strong likelihood of these communities being in extremely isolated rural agricultural areas, both American and Honduran workers were offered on-site community services similar to those found in other company towns, such as free, furnished housing (similar to barracks) for workers and their immediate family members, health care via hospitals/clinics/health units, education (2–6 years) for children/younger dependents/ other laborers, commissaries (grocery/retail), religious (United Fruit built on-site churches) and social activities, agricultural training at the Zamorano Pan-American Agricultural School, and cultural contributions such as the restoration of the Mayan city Zaculeu in Guatemala.

According to a 2022 study in Econometrica, the UFCo had a positive and persistent effect on living standards in Costa Rica, which had granted substantial land concessions to the company from 1899 to 1984. The reason is that the company invested heavily in local amenities, such as education and health care, in order to attract and maintain a sizable workforce.

==== End of the Honduran banana republic era ====
At the end of the 1970s energy crisis, Honduras was under the administration of Oswaldo Lopez Arellano after he seized control from President Ramon Villeda Morales. Trying to redistribute the taken lands of Honduras, President Arellano attempted to aid the Honduran people in regaining their economic independence but was stopped by President Ramón Ernesto Cruz Uclés in 1971. In 1960, the Organization of the Petroleum Exporting Countries (OPEC) was created and did not involve Costa Rica, Guatemala, Honduras, Panama, and Colombia. Designed to strengthen the same nations that experienced extreme economic turmoil, the authority and control of foreign multinational companies, 1970s energy crisis, and the inflation of trade tariffs. Through nullification of the concession contracts originally granted to the U.S. multinational companies, Latin American countries were able to further their plan for progress but were met with hostility from the U.S. companies. Later in 1974, President Arellano approved a new agrarian reform granting thousands of acres of expropriated lands from the United Fruit Company back to Honduran people. The worsened relations between the U.S. and the newly affirmed powers of the Latin American countries would bring all parties into the 1974 banana War.

The United Fruit Company is reported to have been involved in bribing government officials in exchange for preferential treatment and working to consolidate monopolies. Latin American journalists sometimes referred to the company as el pulpo ("the octopus"), and leftist parties in Latin America encouraged the company's workers to strike. Criticism of the United Fruit Company became a staple of the discourse of the communist parties in several Latin American countries, where its activities were often interpreted as illustrating Vladimir Lenin's theory of capitalist imperialism. Major writers in Latin America, such as Carlos Luis Fallas of Costa Rica, Ramón Amaya Amador of Honduras, Miguel Ángel Asturias and Augusto Monterroso of Guatemala, Gabriel García Márquez of Colombia, Carmen Lyra of Costa Rica, and Pablo Neruda of Chile, denounced the company in their literature.

The Fruit Company, Inc. reserved for itself the most succulent piece, the central coast of my own land, the delicate waist of America. It rechristened its territories 'Banana Republics', and over the sleeping dead, over the restless heroes who brought about the greatness, the liberty, and the flags, it established the comic opera: it abolished free will, gave out imperial crowns, encouraged envy, attracted the dictatorship of flies ... flies sticky with submissive blood and marmalade, drunken flies that buzz over the tombs of the people, circus flies, wise flies expert at tyranny.

— Pablo Neruda, "La United Fruit Co." (1950)

The business practices of United Fruit were also frequently criticized by journalists, politicians, and artists in the United States. Little Steven released a song in 1987 called "Bitter Fruit", with lyrics that referred to a hard life for a company "far away", and whose accompanying video depicted orange groves worked by peasants overseen by wealthy managers. The lyrics and scenery are generic, but United Fruit (or its successor Chiquita) was reputedly the target.

US Secretary of State John Foster Dulles and his law firm of Sullivan & Cromwell negotiated land giveaways to the United Fruit Company in Guatemala and Honduras. John Foster Dulles's brother, Allen Dulles, who was head of the CIA under Eisenhower, also did legal work for United Fruit. The Dulles brothers and Sullivan & Cromwell were on the United Fruit payroll for thirty-eight years.

=== United fruit and labor challenges ===
==== Invasive banana diseases ====
Epidemic diseases would cyclically strike the banana enterprise in the form of Panama disease, black sigatoka, and Moko (Ralstonia solanacearum). Large investments of capital, resources, time, tactical practices, and extensive research would be necessary in search for a solution. The agriculture research facilities employed by United Fruit pioneered in the field of treatment with physical solutions such as controlling Panama disease via "flood fallowing" and chemical formulations such as the Bordeaux mixture spray.

These forms of treatment and control would be rigorously applied by laborers on a daily basis and for long periods of time so that they would be as effective as possible. Potentially toxic chemicals were constantly exposed to workers such as copper(II) sulfate in Bordeaux spray (which is still used intensively today in organic and "bio" agriculture), 1,2-dibromo-3-chloropropane in Nemagon the treatment for Moko, or the sigatoka control process that began a chemical spray followed by an acid wash of bananas post-harvesting. The fungicidal treatments would cause workers to inhale fungicidal dust and come into direct skin contact with the chemicals without means of decontamination until the end of their workday. These chemicals would be studied and proven to carry their own negative repercussions towards the laborers and land of these host nations.

While the Panama disease was the first major challenging and aggressive epidemic, again United Fruit would be faced with an even more combative fungal disease, Black sigatoka, in 1935. Within a year, sigatoka plagued 80% of their Honduran crop and once again scientists would begin a search for a solution to this new epidemic. By the end of 1937 production resumed to its normal level for United Fruit after the application of Bordeaux spray, but not without creating devastating blows to the banana production. "Between 1936–1937, the Tela Railroad Company banana output fell from 5.8 to 3.7 million bunches" and this did not include independent farmers who also suffered from the same epidemics, "export figures confirm the devastating effect of the pathogen on non-company growers: between 1937-1939 their exports plummeted from 1.7 million bunches to a mere 122,000 bunches". Without any positive eradication of sigatoka from banana farms due to the tropical environment, the permanent fungicidal treatment was incorporated and promoted in every major banana enterprise, which would be reflective in the time, resources, labor, and allocation of expenses needed for rehabilitation.

==== Environmental effects ====
The United Fruit Company's plantation-style agriculture degraded arable land and negatively impacted the environment. Infrastructure used to farm and transport fruit was constructed by clearing out forests, filling in low, swampy areas, and installing sewage, drainage, and water systems. To create farmland, the UFCO would either clearcut forests or drain wetlands to cultivate soil suitable for banana plant growth. Ecosystems that existed prior to the introduction of farming were destroyed, reducing biodiversity. The most common practice in farming was "shifting plantation agriculture," which intensely used soil and hydrological resources before relocating when yields fell and banana plant pathogens appeared.

In addition, non-native species were introduced into the environment. UFCO employees introduced 1,800 largemouth bass into Lake Yojoa in Honduras. From 1954–55 to about 1970, the bass population exploded and negatively impacted native fish populations.

=== Reputation ===
The United Fruit Company is reported to have been involved in bribing government officials in exchange for preferential treatment and working to consolidate monopolies. Latin American journalists sometimes referred to the company as el pulpo ("the octopus"), and leftist parties in Latin America encouraged the company's workers to strike. Criticism of the United Fruit Company became a staple of the discourse of the communist parties in several Latin American countries, where its activities were often interpreted as illustrating Vladimir Lenin's theory of capitalist imperialism. Major writers in Latin America, such as Carlos Luis Fallas of Costa Rica, Ramón Amaya Amador of Honduras, Miguel Ángel Asturias and Augusto Monterroso of Guatemala, Gabriel García Márquez of Colombia, Carmen Lyra of Costa Rica, and Pablo Neruda of Chile, denounced the company in their literature.

The Fruit Company, Inc. reserved for itself the most succulent piece, the central coast of my own land, the delicate waist of America. It rechristened its territories 'Banana Republics', and over the sleeping dead, over the restless heroes who brought about the greatness, the liberty, and the flags, it established the comic opera: it abolished free will, gave out imperial crowns, encouraged envy, attracted the dictatorship of flies ... flies sticky with submissive blood and marmalade, drunken flies that buzz over the tombs of the people, circus flies, wise flies expert at tyranny.

— Pablo Neruda, "La United Fruit Co." (1950)

The business practices of United Fruit were also frequently criticized by journalists, politicians, and artists in the United States. Little Steven released a song in 1987 called "Bitter Fruit", with lyrics that referred to a hard life for a company "far away", and whose accompanying video depicted orange groves worked by peasants overseen by wealthy managers. The lyrics and scenery are generic, but United Fruit (or its successor Chiquita) was reputedly the target.

US Secretary of State John Foster Dulles and his law firm of Sullivan & Cromwell negotiated land giveaways to the United Fruit Company in Guatemala and Honduras. John Foster Dulles's brother, Allen Dulles, who was head of the CIA under Eisenhower, also did legal work for United Fruit. The Dulles brothers and Sullivan & Cromwell were on the United Fruit payroll for thirty-eight years.

== The Great White Fleet ==
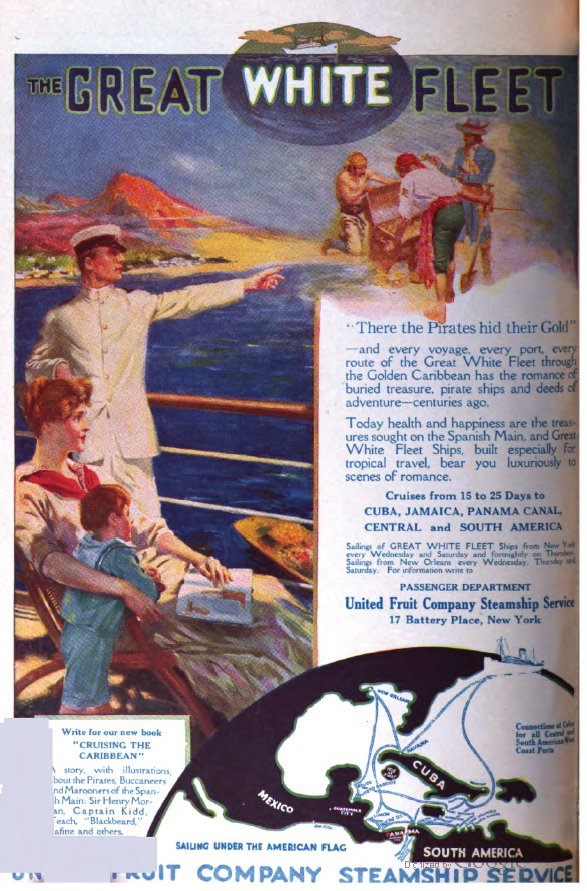
1916 advertisement for the United Fruit Company steamship service

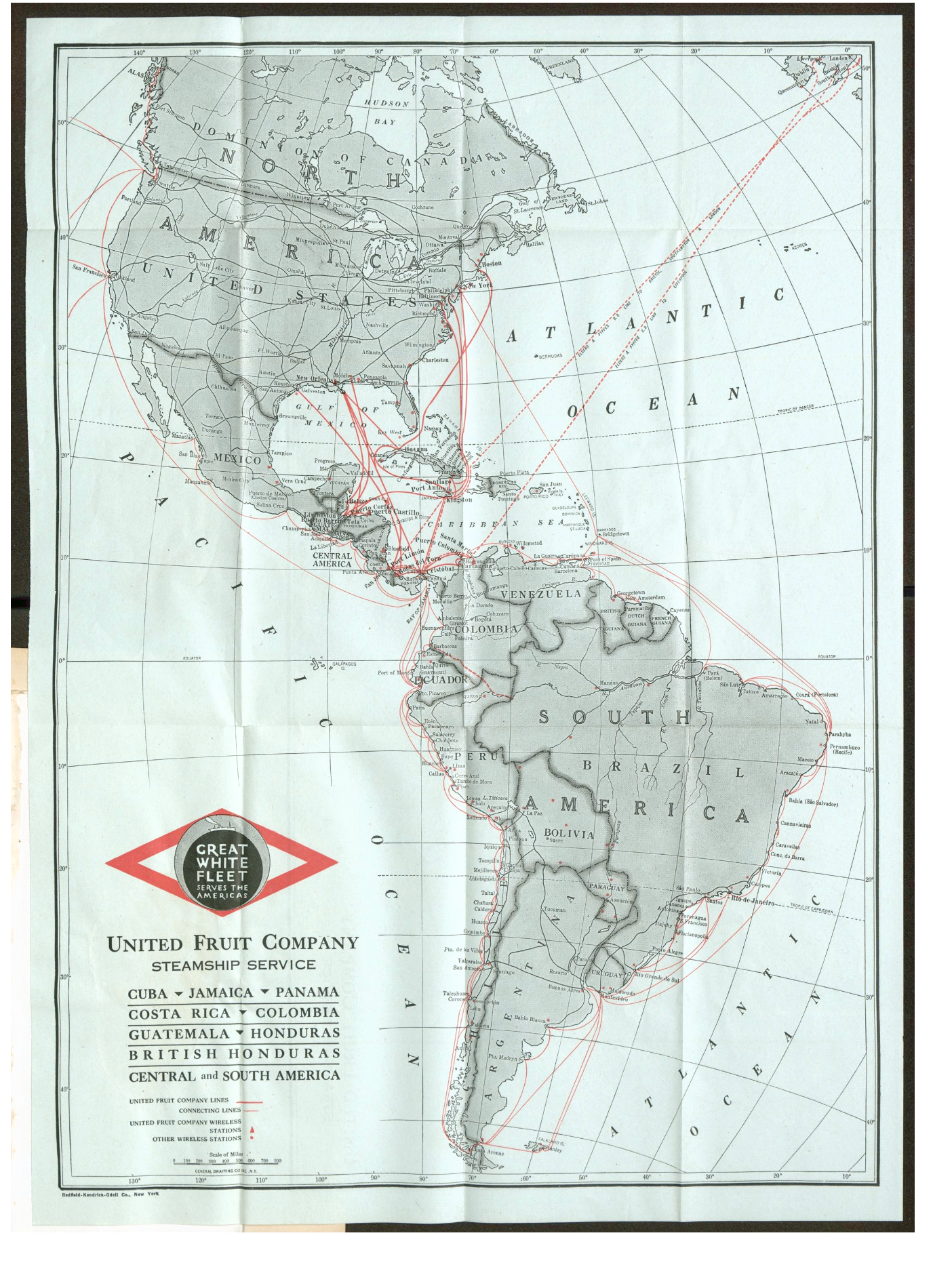
Routes of United Fruit Company steamship service (1924)

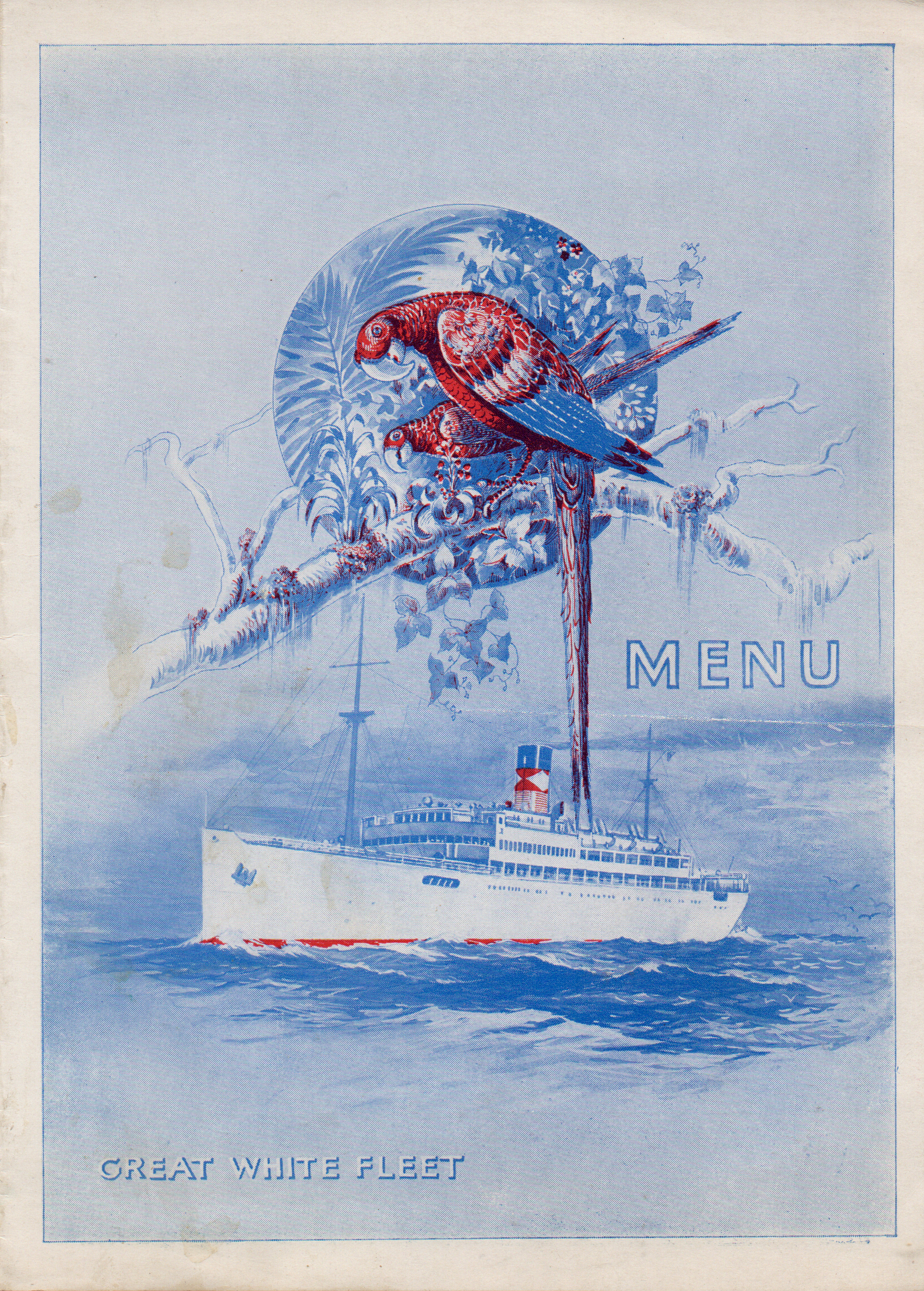
Dinner menu, T.E.S. Chiriqui, 1935

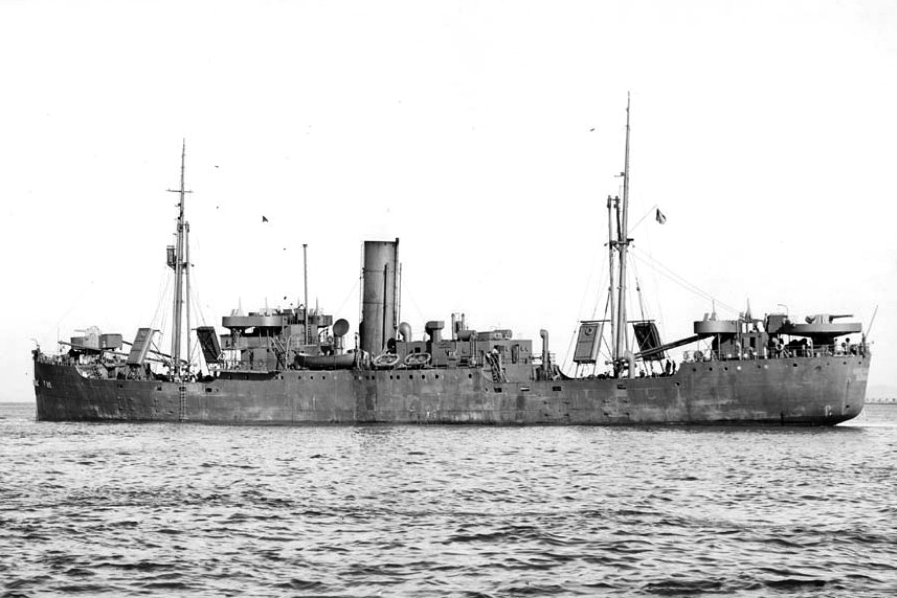
USS Taurus, which was built as San Benito in 1921, may have been the world's first turbo-electric merchant ship

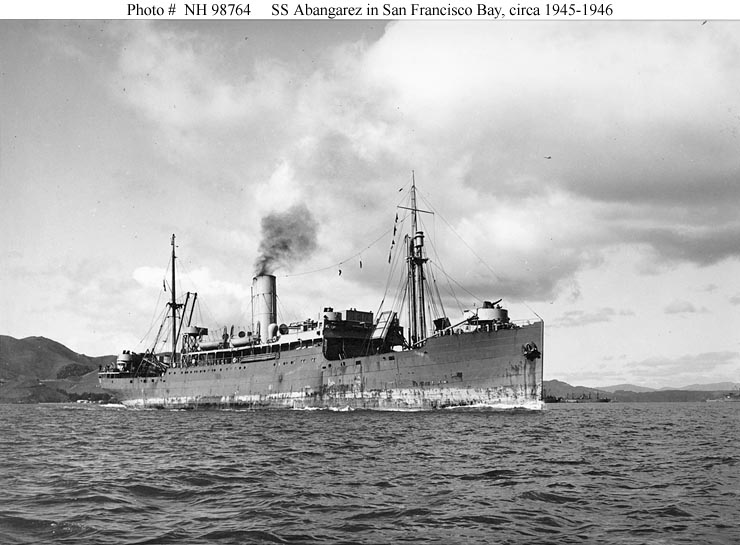
SS Abangarez, a United Fruit banana boat, c. 1945

The United Fruit Company’s Great White Fleet played a central role in maintaining the company’s banana export operations in the Caribbean and Central America during the early to mid-20th century. The fleet consisted of refrigerated steamships designed to transport perishable goods efficiently to markets in the United States. In addition to carrying bananas, the ships often transported passengers and general cargo, linking port cities in the region with major U.S. hubs such as New Orleans and New York. The development of refrigerated shipping technology allowed United Fruit to expand the scale and reliability of its export system, reducing spoilage and transit time. The fleet operated on regular schedules, which helped standardize supply chains and stabilize export volumes. Historians note that this logistical network was a key component of the company’s vertically integrated business model.

- Admiral Dewey, Admiral Schley, Admiral Sampson and Admiral Farragut (1899) were United States Navy vessels declared surplus after the Spanish–American War. Each carried 53 passengers and 35,000 bunches of bananas.
- Venus (1903) United Fruit Company's first refrigerated banana ship
- San Jose, Limon and Esparta (1904) first banana reefers built to United Fruit design. San Jose and Esparta were sunk by U-boats in World War II.
- Atenas (1909) class of 13 5,000-ton banana reefers built in Ireland
- Tivives (1911) 4,596 GRT fruit carrier built by Workman, Clark & Company of Belfast, changed from British to United States registry 1914 when war broke out in Europe, served briefly as commissioned transport for U.S. Navy in World War I, and was again in service for World War II under U.S. Army charter then as War Shipping Administration transport. Torpedoed and sunk October 21, 1943 by German aircraft off Algeria in Convoy MKS-28.
- Carrillo and Sixaola, sister ships of Tivives, both 1911, both U.S. Navy in WW I. Carrillo as ID-1406 and Sixaola as ID-2777/4524. Both in WW II as United Fruit operated vessels for the War Shipping Administration. Carrillo survived to be scrapped 1948. Sixaola was torpedoed and sunk 12 June 1942.
- Pastores (1912) 7241-ton cruise liner became USS Pastores (AF-16)
- Calamares (1913) 7,622-ton banana reefer became USS Calamares (AF-18)
- Toloa (1917) 6,494-ton banana reefer
- Ulua (1917) 6,494-ton banana reefer became USS Octans (AF-26)
- San Benito (1921) 3,724-ton turbo-electric banana reefer became USS Taurus (AF-25)
- Mayari and Choluteca (1921) 3,724-ton banana reefers
- La Playa (1923) banana reefer
- La Marea (1924) 3,689-ton diesel-electric banana reefer became Darien 4,281-ton turbo-electric banana reefer in about 1929–31
- Telda, Iriona, Castilla and Tela (1927) banana reefers
- Aztec (1929) banana reefer
- Platano and Musa (1930) turbo-electric banana reefers
- Talamanca (1931) 6,963-ton turbo-electric passenger and cargo liner became USS Talamanca (AF-15)
- Jamaica (1931) 6,968-ton turbo-electric passenger and cargo liner became USS Ariel (AF-22)
- Chiriqui (1931) 6,963-ton turbo-electric passenger and cargo liner became USS Tarazed (AF-13)
- SS Antigua (1931) 6,982-ton Turbo-electric passenger and cargo liner providing two-week cruises of Cuba, Jamaica, Colombia, Honduras and the Panama Canal Zone.
- Quirigua (1932) 6,982-ton turbo-electric passenger and cargo liner became USS Mizar (AF-12)
- Veraqua (1932) 6,982-ton turbo-electric passenger and cargo liner became USS Merak (AF-21)
- Oratava (1936) banana reefer
- Comayagua, Junior, Metapan, Yaque and Fra Berlanga (1946) banana reefers
- Manaqui (1946) bulk sugar ship

== See also ==
- Chiquita Brands International
- United Fruit Company strike (1913)
- Lancetilla Botanical Garden

== Sources ==
- Schoultz, Lars (1998). Beneath the United States. Harvard University Press. ISBN 9780674922761.
