= USS Octans =

Cargo ship of the United States Navy

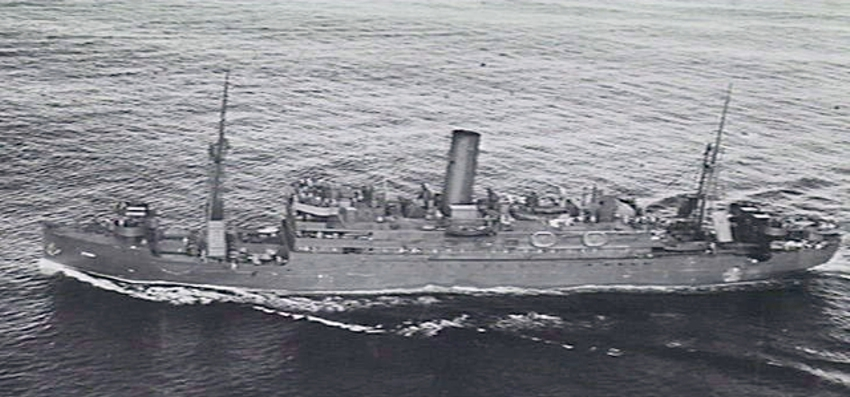

History

United States
- Builder: Workman Clark Belfast
- Laid down: date unknown
- Launched: in 1917 as SS Ulua
- Acquired: 8 May 1943
- Commissioned: 11 June 1943
- Decommissioned: 6 March 1946
- Stricken: 20 March 1946
- Fate: Scrapped 1948

General characteristics
- Displacement: 11,030 t.(fl)
- Length: 440 ft (130 m)
- Beam: 54 ft 4 in (16.56 m)
- Draught: 26 ft 2 in (7.98 m)
- Propulsion: Reciprocating engines, twin screws, 6,000hp
- Speed: 13.5 kts. (max)
- Complement: 227
- Armament: one single 5 in (130 mm) dual purpose gun mount, four 3 in (76 mm) dual purpose guns, eight 20 mm guns

USS Octans (AF-26) was a stores ship acquired by the United States Navy for service in World War II, named after the constellation Octans. She was responsible for delivering necessary goods and equipment to ships and stations in the war zone.

Octans (AF–26) was built as SS Ulua in 1917 by Workman Clark and Co., Ltd., Belfast; acquired by the Navy 8 May 1943 under charter through the War Shipping Administration from her owner, the United Fruit Co.; and commissioned 11 June.

== World War II Pacific Theatre operations ==
Following two weeks of fitting out at Oakland, California, Octans departed San Francisco Bay on 25 June 1943, bound for Nouméa, New Caledonia. Arriving there 17 July, she took up her mission of transporting fresh and frozen provisions from New Zealand and Australian ports to ships and bases located in the Solomons, the Admiralties, and New Guinea.

== Transporting wounded soldiers ==
During an availability at Sydney, Australia, in November 1944, another capability and task was added with the installation of a 30-bed sick bay. On succeeding trips to Australia from more-advanced bases, wounded soldiers and sailors were transferred from the battle areas to recovery havens.

== Shooting down a Japanese plane in the Philippines ==
From that time also, Octans began to range farther to the north as she made supply trips to Leyte, Mindoro, and Luzon. While returning from Leyte Gulf on 1 January 1945, she was credited with downing one of a number of Japanese planes which attacked her convoy.

== Post-war activity ==
With almost two years of supply duty behind her, Octans returned to the West Coast of the United States for a brief overhaul, arriving at Oakland 15 May. Seven weeks later, following a stop in Seattle, Washington, for provisions, she again crossed the Pacific Ocean, arriving at Manila on 13 August. After two more trips to Australia, the stores ship made deliveries to Shanghai, China, and departed 29 December for the United States.

== Post-war decommissioning ==
Octans sailed to the U.S. East Coast and arrived in Baltimore, Maryland, on 20 February 1946. Decommissioning on 6 March, she was returned to her owner the same day and struck from the Navy List on 20 March.

== Military awards and honors ==
Octans' crew members were authorized the following medals:

- China Service Medal (Extended)
- American Campaign Medal
- Asiatic-Pacific Campaign Medal
- World War II Victory Medal
- Philippines Liberation Medal
