= Turbo generator =

Electric generator connected to a turbine

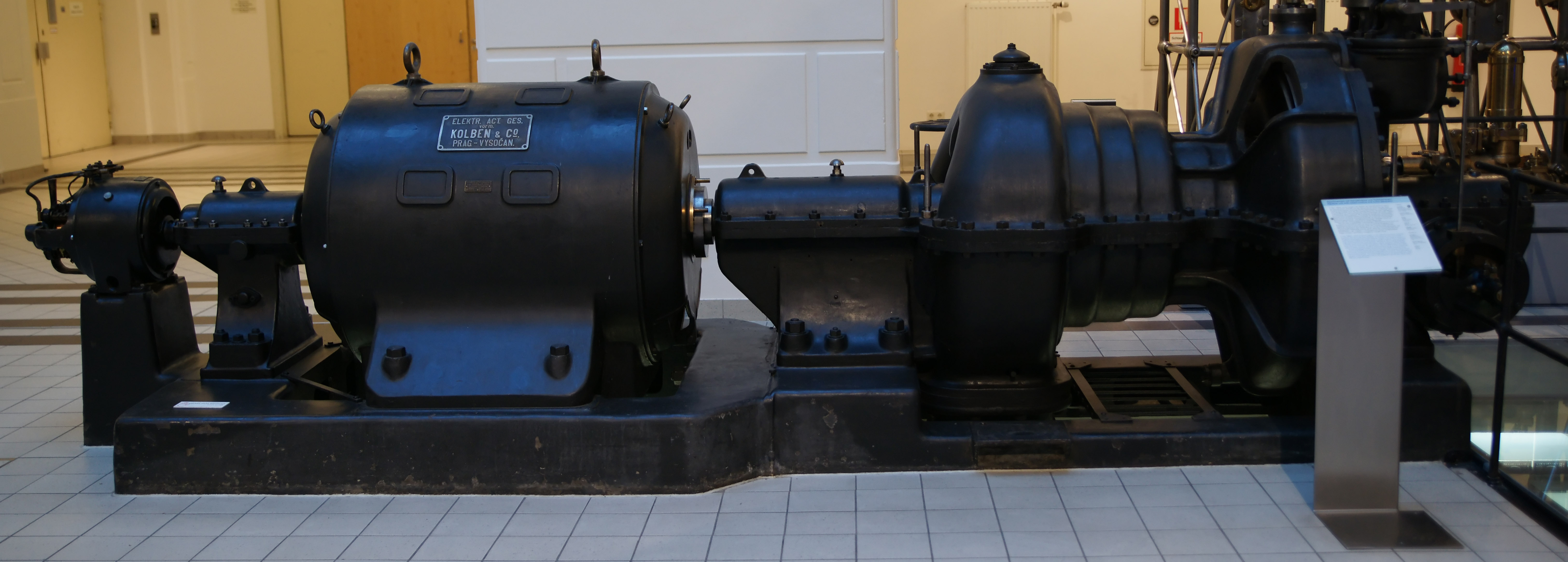
250 kW steam turbine generator set (1910)

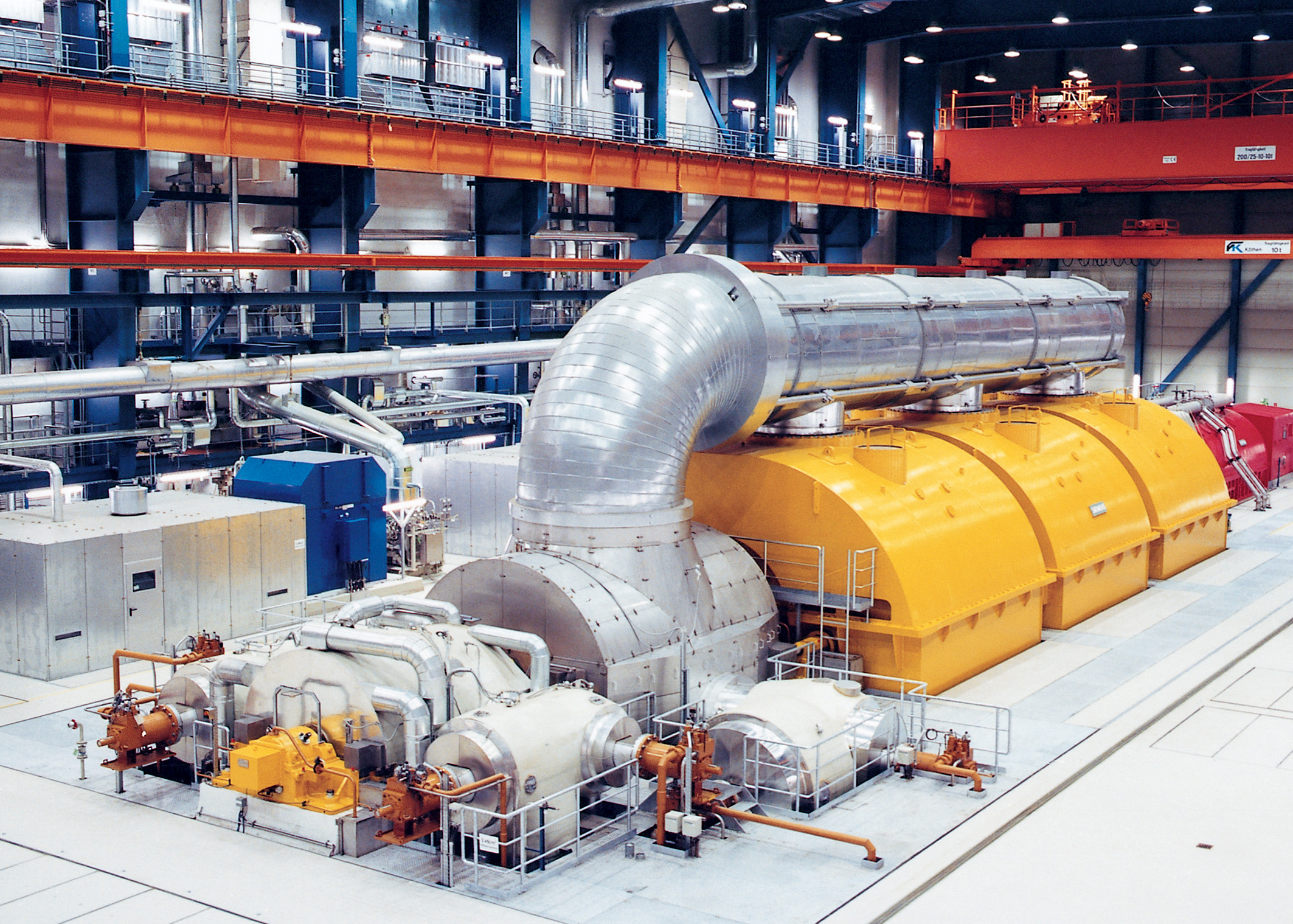
500 MW Siemens multi stage steam turbine with generator set (rear, red)

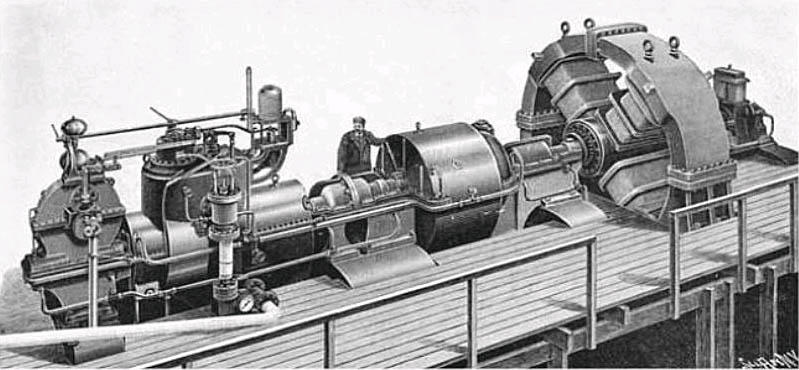
Parsons first 1 MW steam turbine driven "Turbogenerator" (made 1900 for a plant in Elberfeld, Germany)

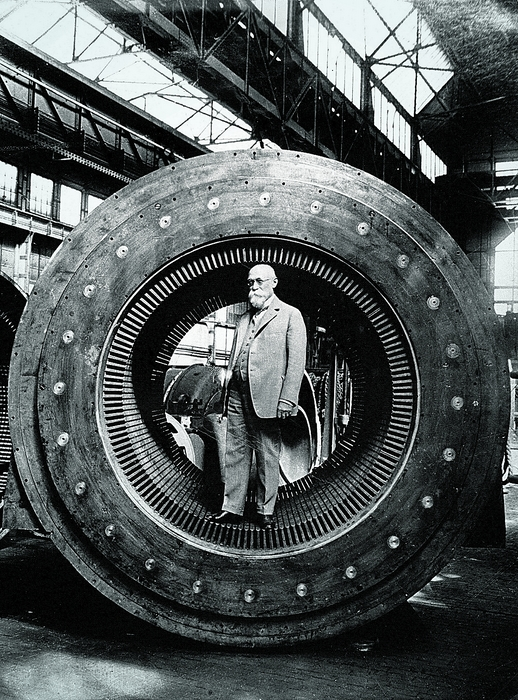
Ottó Bláthy in the armature of a Ganz turbo generator (1904)

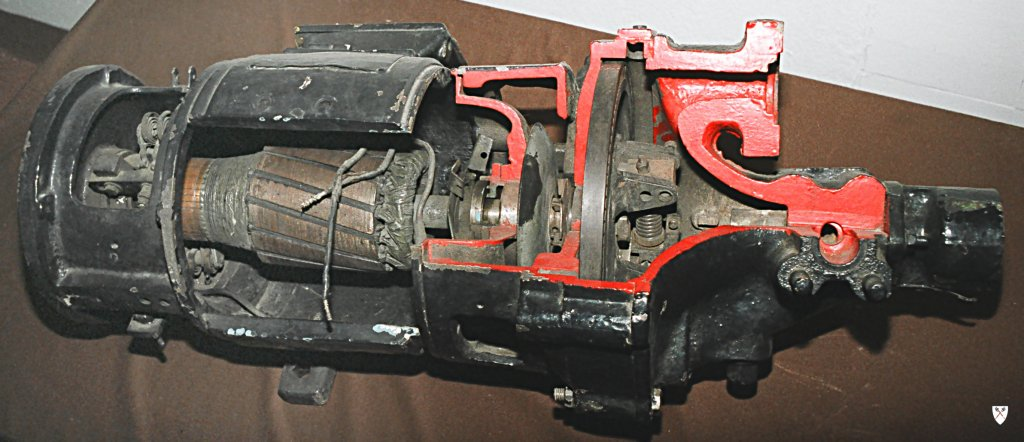
Small RP4 steam turbo generator set 500W/24V for a steam locomotive: alternator (left) + turbine (right)

A turbo generator is an electric generator connected to the shaft of a turbine (water, steam, or gas) for the generation of electric power. (Note: For the purposes of this article, the term turbo generator means the electrical machine that converts mechanical power from a rotating turbine shaft to electrical power. However, there is inconsistency between sources about the definition of turbo-generator. Some online dictionaries give a definition: "A turbo generator is the combination of a turbine directly connected to an electric generator for the generation of electric power" , and there is a similar definition here . Other dictionaries and most electrical engineering sources give a definition that is limited to the electrical machine, with the turbine identified as a separate entity. See , , and from the IEEE: and . Sources from manufacturers also support the definition being limited to the electrical machine. and , and "Turbo generators for thermal power plants". ANDRITZ. Archived from the original on May 31, 2023.) Large steam-powered turbo generators provide the majority of the world's electricity and are also used by steam-powered turbo-electric and gas-turbine-electric powered ships.

Small turbo-generators driven by gas turbines are often used as auxiliary power units (APU, mainly for aircraft).

== History ==
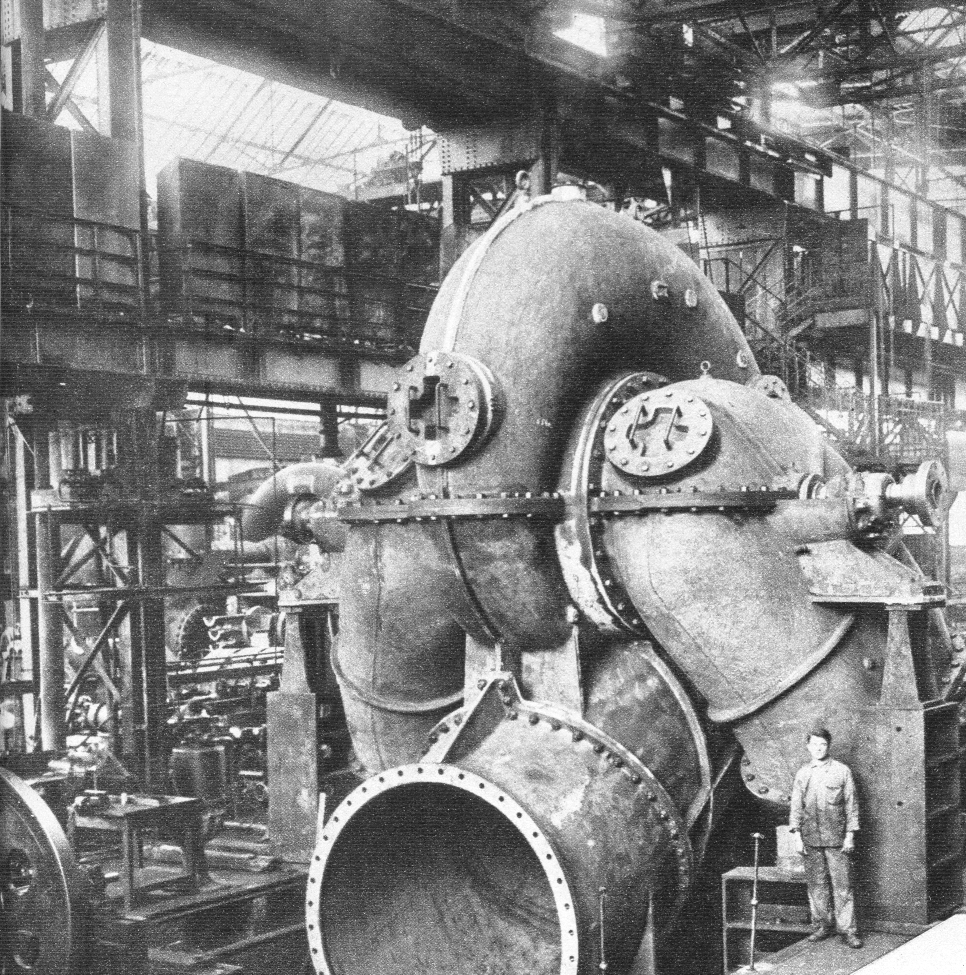
Turbine construction at the Ganz Company c. 1886

The first turbo-generators were electric generators powered by water turbines. The first Hungarian water turbine was designed by the engineers of the Ganz Works in 1866; industrial-scale production with dynamo generators started only in 1883. Engineer Charles Algernon Parsons demonstrated a DC steam-powered turbo generator using a dynamo in 1887, and by 1901 had supplied the first large industrial AC turbo generator of megawatt power to a plant in Elberfeld, Germany.

Turbo generators were also used on steam locomotives as a power source for coach lighting and water pumps for heating systems.

== Construction features ==
Turbo generators are used for high shaft rotational speeds, typical of steam and gas turbines. The rotor of a turbo generator is a non-salient pole type usually with two poles.

The normal speed of a turbo generator is 1500 or 3000 rpm with four or two poles at 50 Hz (1800 or 3600 rpm with four or two poles at 60 Hz). The rotating parts of a turbo generator are subjected to high mechanical stresses because of the high operation speed. To make the rotor mechanically resistant in large turbo-alternators, the rotor is normally forged from solid steel and alloys like chromium-nickel-steel or chromium-nickel-molybdenum are used. The overhang of windings at the periphery will be secured by steel retaining rings. Heavy non-magnetic metal wedges on top of the slots hold the field windings against centrifugal forces. Hard composition insulating materials, like mica and asbestos, are normally used in the slots of the rotor. These materials can withstand high temperatures and high crushing forces.

The stator of large turbo generators may be built of two or more parts while in smaller turbo-generators it is built up in one complete piece.

== Hydrogen-cooled turbo generator ==
Based on the air-cooled turbo generator, gaseous hydrogen first went into service as the coolant in a hydrogen-cooled turbo generator in October 1937, at the Dayton Power & Light Co. in Dayton, Ohio. Hydrogen is used as the coolant in the rotor and sometimes the stator, allowing an increase in specific utilization and a 99.0% efficiency. Because of the high thermal conductivity, high specific heat and low density of hydrogen gas, this is the most common type in its field today. The hydrogen can be manufactured on-site by electrolysis.

The generator is hermetically sealed to prevent escape of the hydrogen gas. The absence of oxygen in the atmosphere within significantly reduces the damage of the windings' insulation by eventual corona discharges. The hydrogen gas is circulated within the rotor enclosure, and cooled by a gas-to-water heat exchanger.

== See also ==
- Alternator
- Thermal power station
