= Workman, Clark and Company =

Shipbuilding company

- Company type: Private
- Industry: Shipbuilding
- Founded: 1879
- Defunct: 1935
- Fate: Went in receivership
- Headquarters: Belfast, UK
- Key people: Sir George Clark

Workman, Clark and Company, also known as Workman & Clark, was a shipbuilding company based in Belfast. It operated from 1879 until it went out of business in 1935.

== History ==
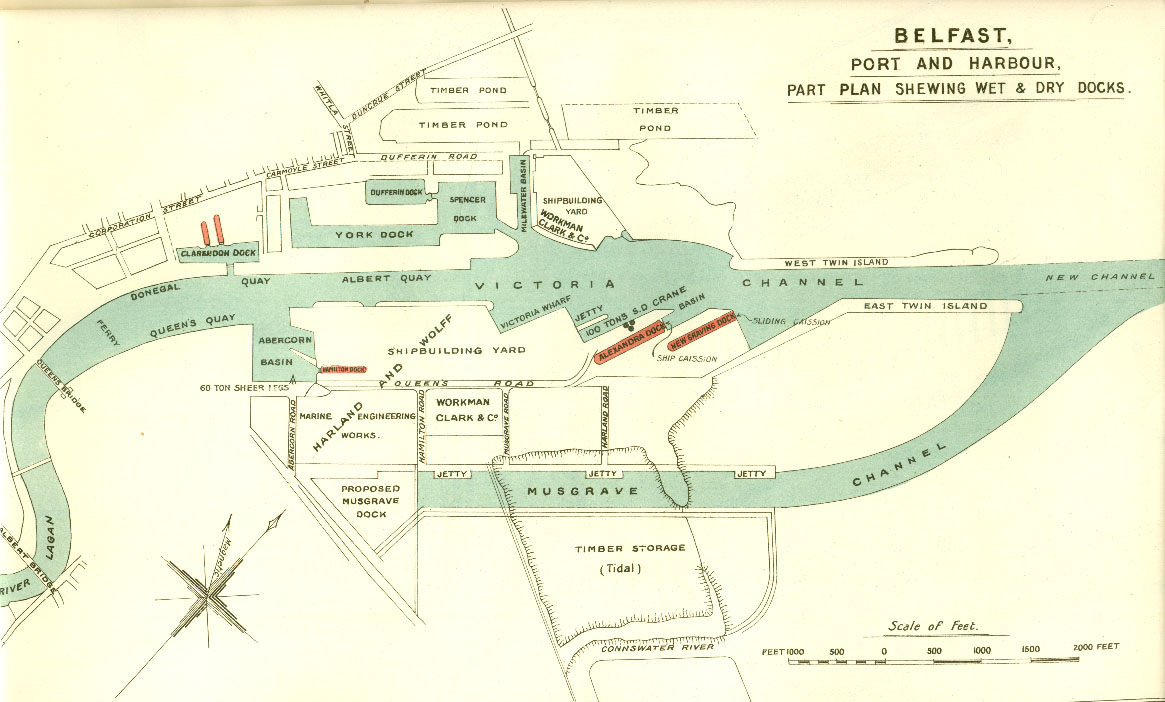
A map of Belfast Port shows Workman & Clark premises on both sides of the Victoria Channel in 1909

The business was established by Frank Workman and George Clark in Belfast Harbour in 1879 and incorporated as Workman, Clark and Company Limited in 1880. Both founders had family connections in the shipbuilding industry and had previously worked for Harland & Wolff.

By 1895 it was the fourth largest shipbuilder in the United Kingdom of Great Britain and Ireland and by 1900 it was building transatlantic liners for major customers such as Cunard Line and Alfred Holt. It expanded further to meet demand during the First World War and was acquired by the Northumberland Shipbuilding Company in 1918.

Both founders retired from the board in 1921 after various problems at the company. Northumberland Shipbuilding went into receivership in 1927. Workman, Clark and Company was then temporarily resurrected, only to go into receivership itself in 1935.

== Frank Workman ==
Frank Workman, then a Belfast city councillor, was a leading figure in the foundation in 1912 of the Young Citizen Volunteers (YCV). From soon after its inception the YCV faced financial problems, and by early 1914 Workman was paying for the upkeep of the group from his own funds.
