= USS Putnam =

USS Putnam may refer to the following ships of the United States Navy:

- USS Putnam (DD-287), was a Clemson-class destroyer, commissioned in 1919 and decommissioned in 1929
- USS Putnam (DD-537), is a Fletcher-class destroyer, renamed and commissioned in 1943 as The Sullivans
- USS Putnam (DD-757), was an Allen M. Sumner-class destroyer, commissioned in 1944 and struck in 1973

== See also ==
- USS General Putnam (1857), a gunship that served during the Civil War (1861–65).
