= SS Appomattox (1893) =

History
- Name: Appomattox (1893-1910); Seyyar (1910-16)
- Owner: Chesapeake & Ohio Steam Ship Company (1893-1902); Elders and Fyffes (1902-10); M. Gumuchdjian (1910-16)
- Builder: Furness Withy, Middleton
- Yard number: 199
- Launched: 12 July 1893
- Completed: September 1893
- Fate: Sunk on 12 March 1916

General characteristics
- Class & type: Banana boat
- Tonnage: 2,875 GRT
- Length: 345 ft 1.75 in (105.20 m)
- Beam: 41 ft 4 in (12.60 m)
- Propulsion: 1 x screw

SS Appomattox was a 3,338 ton banana boat of the Fyffes Line.

== History ==
She was built in 1893 for the Chesapeake & Ohio Steam Ship Company (hence the Virginian name) and sold to Elders & Fyffes in 1902. She undertook occasional work for the United Fruit Company until 1910, when she was sold to M. Gumuchdjian, of Turkey and renamed Seyyar. She was sunk off Karasu by Russian warships on 12 March 1916.
