= TSS Golfito =

Cargo and passenger ship

- TSS Golfito

History

United Kingdom
- Name: Golfito
- Owner: Elders and Fyffes
- Operator: Elders and Fyffes
- Route: Southampton or Avonmouth in England to Barbados, Trinidad and up to five ports in Jamaica (Kingston, Port Antonio, Montego Bay, Oracabessa and Bowdin)
- Builder: Alexander Stephen and Sons
- Launched: 6 October 1948
- Fate: Scrapped 1972

General characteristics
- Type: Passenger-cargo ship/banana boat
- Tonnage: 8,687 gross register tons (GRT)
- Length: 448 feet (137 m)
- Speed: 17.7 knots (32.8 km/h)

TSS Golfito was a 8,687 GRT passenger-carrying banana boat of the Fyffes Line, a fleet of ships owned and operated by the UK banana importer Elders and Fyffes Limited. She was 448 feet (137 m) long and had a top speed of 17.7 knots (32.8 km/h)

== History ==
She was built in 1949 by Alexander Stephen and Sons of Glasgow and scrapped at Faslane in 1972.

== Accommodation ==
She had three passenger decks with cabins for 94 first class passengers, public rooms and open-air deck spaces. These were centred between four large refrigerated cargo holds, two forward and two aft, that could handle 140,000 stems (1,750 tons) of bananas.

== Trade ==
Her main trade was general cargo outwards (mostly British manufactured goods), returning with bananas.

== Routing ==
She was routed on 4-5 week voyages from Southampton or Avonmouth in England to Barbados, Trinidad and up to five ports on Jamaica (Kingston, Port Antonio, Montego Bay, Oracabessa and Bowden) where bananas were loaded through the cool of the night.

== Sister ship ==
In 1956 she was joined by a sister ship, Camito. Together they provided a regular fortnightly service between the UK and the Caribbean.

== See also ==
- The Ships List: Elders & Fyffes.
