= HMS Palomares =

1937 British banana boat converted to anti-aircraft ship

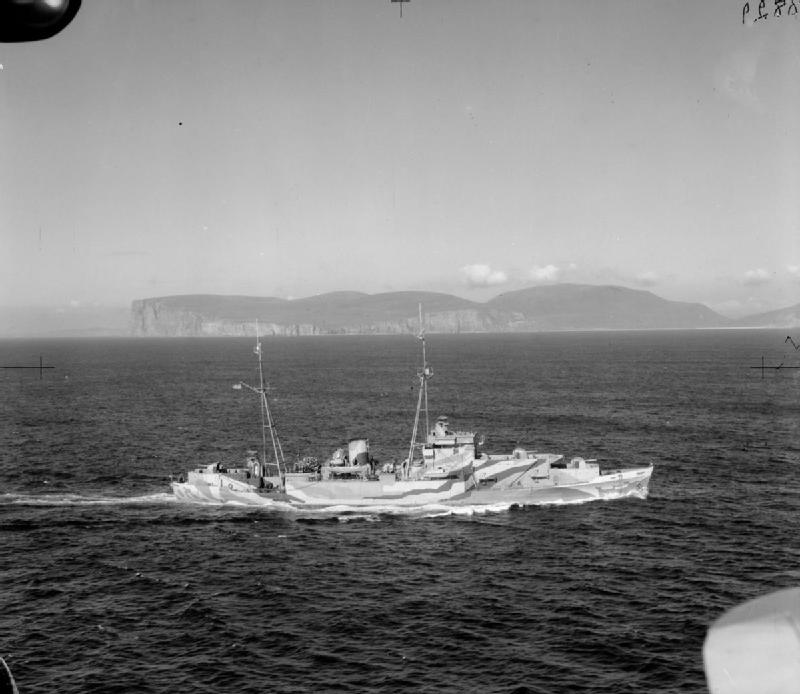
- HMS Palomares in August 1941

History

United Kingdom
- Name: MV Palomares
- Operator: MacAndrews Line
- Builder: William Doxford & Sons, Sunderland
- Launched: 20 October 1937
- Out of service: 1940
- Fate: Sold

United Kingdom
- Name: HMS Palomares
- Owner: Royal Navy
- Acquired: 1940
- Identification: Pennant number: F98
- Fate: Sold

United Kingdom
- Name: MV Palomares
- Operator: MacAndrews Line
- Fate: Sold 1959, wrecked 1961

General characteristics as HMS Palomares
- Tonnage: 1,896 GRT
- Armament: 4 × 2 4-inch guns, 2 × 4 2-pounder guns

HMS Palomares was a British anti-aircraft ship of the Second World War.

Originally MV Palomares, built by William Doxford & Sons, Sunderland yard in 1937, it operated as a merchant fruit carrier ship (a 13.5 kn (25.0 km/h; 15.5 mph) banana boat) for service on the MacAndrews Line in January 1938 with their Spanish service.

== Service ==
She was purchased by the Admiralty in 1940, as these fruit ships were considered to be fast and manoeuvrable. In 1941 the Admiralty converted her to an anti-aircraft ship and then to a fighter direction ship ("seagoing anti-aircraft auxiliaries"). Most likely the conversion took place at Fairfields yard in Govan on the River Clyde with her sister ship HMS Pozarica.

In March 1942, she sailed with Pozarica, and the corvettes HMS Poppy, Lotus, La Malouine and Dianella for the port of Seyðisfjörður in Iceland. In June 1942, she sailed as an escort in Convoy PQ 17, where 25 out of 36 ships were lost to the Germans, while working around Murmansk and Archangel.

In November 1942, Palomares took part in the Operation Torch landings in Algiers as an anti-aircraft ship. The ship left Gibraltar on 3 November and arrived on 8 November. The next day Palomares was hit by a bomb that caused many casualties, caused a large fire and put the steering gear out of action. Deceased seamen were transferred to the corvette HMS Samphire for burial at sea and her steering gear was repaired by 10 November.

In September 1943, during the Salerno landings of Italy on 9 September, Palomares was a fighter direction ship, directing fighters with her radar system.

In January 1944, Palomares again served as a fighter direction ship during the Anzio landings. Arriving at the beachhead on 22 January, she struck a mine and was towed back to Naples by the tugs Edenshaw and Evea. In September 1945, Palomares was to have participated in the Malaya landings but could not, as a fire had damaged her engine room.

== Armaments and displacement ==
Upon conversion to an anti-aircraft ship, HMS Palomares was equipped with eight 4-inch AA guns in four turrets and eight 2-pounder (40mm) pom-poms in two quadruple mounts. In December 1942, to take the role of a fighter-direction ship, Palomares was fitted with radar for directing fighter aircraft. HMS Palomares had a weight of 1,896 GRT and could move at 13.5 kn (25.0 km/h; 15.5 mph).

== Returned ==
Surviving the war, Palomares was returned to the MacAndrews Line in 1946, where she continued service with the company until 1959. She was then sold, being renamed Mary Sven and in 1961 sold again becoming Sarabande. On 5 October 1961 following a fire she drifted aground and was wrecked.
