= Banana boat (ship) =

Reefer ships engaged in banana trade

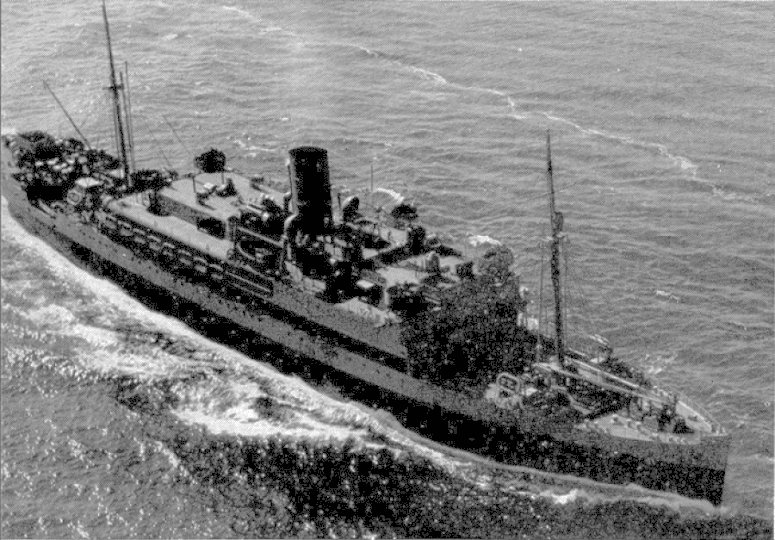
United Fruit Company's Veragua as USS Merak

Banana boat is a descriptive nickname that was given to fast ships, also called banana carriers, engaged in the banana trade. They were designed to transport easily spoiled bananas rapidly from tropical growing areas to North America and Europe. They often carried passengers as well as fruit.

== History ==
In 1871 the Trinidad correspondent of The Gardeners' Chronicle said that bananas were the only export of Aspinwall (Colón, Panama). The trade was mainly confined to four merchants. They sent the fruit by American steamers, known to the people as banana boats, which carried five to six thousand bunches on each trip. Plantations were around 7 miles (11 km) or 8 miles (13 km) from the town, and annually the merchants contracted sole rights with growers to take their entire crop at a set price per bunch, delivered to the side of the railroad. When a steamer was sighted, the farms were alerted to prepare and, once the merchant had confirmed how many bunches it could take, his agents went to contracted farms telling each how many thousand bunches it was to provide. Aspinwall exported around 150,000 bunches of bananas to New York each year. Shipping companies were set up, and the American United Fruit Company was formed through mergers in 1899.

Doris Turnbull in coveralls, as a passenger enjoying life on a banana boat, May 1926, Barbados to Avonmouth, England after working in Barbados. Her handwritten note at bottom reads "After visit round Banana holds."

In 1901, banana boats began calling at Avonmouth, England, where the dock workers, employed on a casual basis, valued getting several days work with good wages and overtime, and called them the "plum" ships. Elders & Fyffes began operations, then itself came under control of the United Fruit Company in 1910. In the 1930s, refrigerated ships such as SS Antigua and SS Contessa which were engaged in the Central America to United States trade also operated as luxurious passenger vessels. Surplus naval vessels were converted in some cases in the search for speed with Standard Fruit converting four U.S. Navy destroyer hulls, without machinery, to the banana carriers Masaya, Matagalpa, Tabasco and Teapa in 1932. Transfers to naval service served as transports and particularly chilled stores ships such as USS Mizar, the United Fruit passenger and banana carrier Quirigua, and the lead ship of a group that were known as the Mizar class of stores ships. Modern banana boats tend to be reefer ships or other refrigerated ships that carry cooled bananas on one leg of a voyage, then general cargo on the return leg.

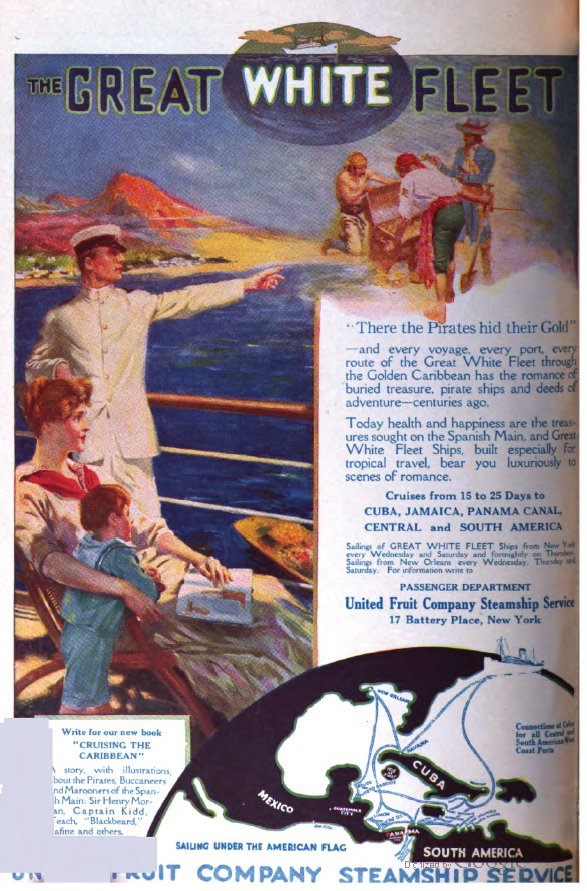
1916 advertisement for the United Fruit Company Steamship Service

The large companies in the banana trade, such as Standard Fruit Company and United Fruit Company in the United States, and Fyffes Line in the UK, acquired or built ships for the purpose, some strictly banana carriers and others with passenger accommodations.

United Fruit operated a large fleet, advertised as The Great White Fleet, for over a century until its successor Chiquita Brands International sold the last ships in a sale with leaseback in 2007 of eight refrigerated and four container ships that transported approximately 70% of the company's bananas to North America and Europe. At one time the fleet consisted of 100 refrigerated ships and was the world's largest private fleet with some being lent to the Central Intelligence Agency to support the attempted overthrow of the Castro regime in the Bay of Pigs landing.

== In popular culture ==
In the 1930s, these ships were often seen on the River Clyde, and in Glasgow the phrase "do you think I came up the Clyde in a banana boat?", as a way of saying "do you think I'm stupid?", became a favoured retort when asked a question with an obvious answer. Retired Clydebank headteacher Carl Vaughan, who left Jamaica by banana boat with other volunteer RAF recruits in 1942, recalled the phrase as "most often said in response to the telling of an incredible story, or after someone tries to pull a trick on another, but is found out", a typically Glaswegian humorous reply. Variations of the phrase have been used in several countries, often in a self-deprecating friendly way but at other times in a derogatory way to mock incomers. By the 1970s, most of the British African-Caribbean community had been born in the UK.

Travellers on banana boats to and from the West Indies included the West Indian cricket team in England in 1928, which went out on SS Camino. That 1915 built ship was torpedoed by a German submarine in 1941. Its successor, TSS Camito, was built in 1956, and in December 1959 took the English cricket team to the West Indies for the MCC tour. Although air travel had become more common, the sea voyage was favoured to give players time to acclimatise. Storms affected the unladen banana boat; "It pitched and rolled for most of the ten-day voyage and some of the team never left their cabins", so this became the last MCC tour to sail to the Caribbean.

The term "banana boat" is perhaps best known today in the context of Harry Belafonte's 1956 hit recording "Day-O (The Banana Boat Song)", a traditional Jamaican folk song in the calypso music style with call and response lyrics from the point of view of dock workers who have worked overnight loading bananas, and want their work counted up so that they can go home. The song's original setting was Boundbrook Wharf in Port Antonio, Jamaica, where bananas are still loaded for shipping to Europe and the United States.

== Gallery ==
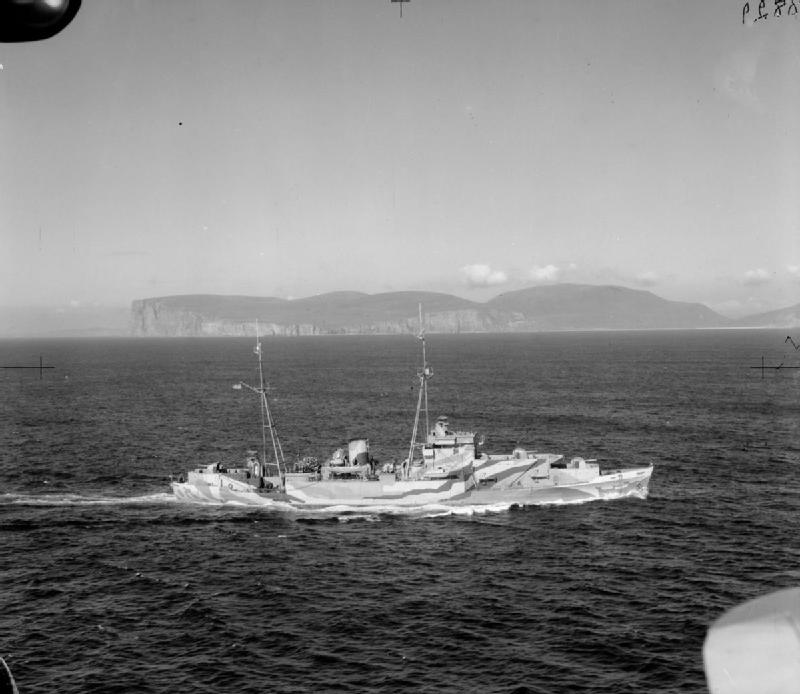
Anti-aircraft ship HMS Palomares, 1941 (converted banana boat MV Palomares)

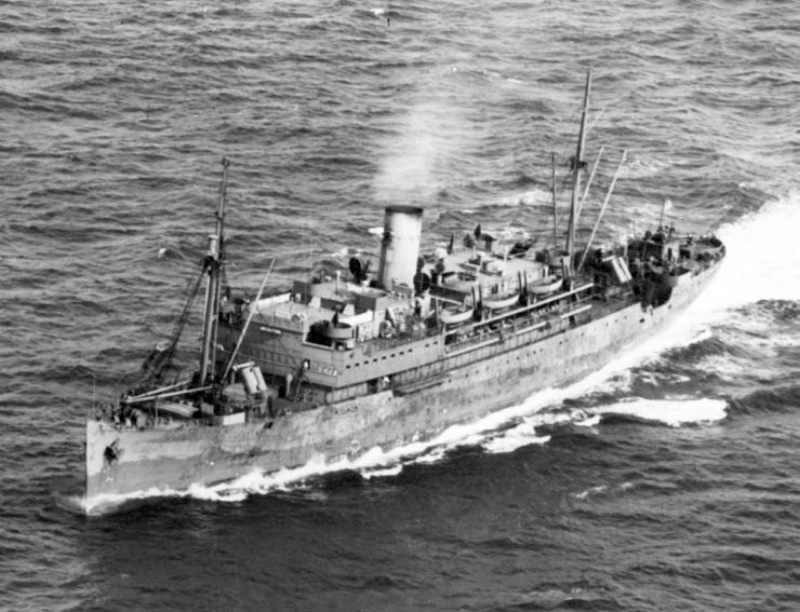
SS Antigua, November 1942

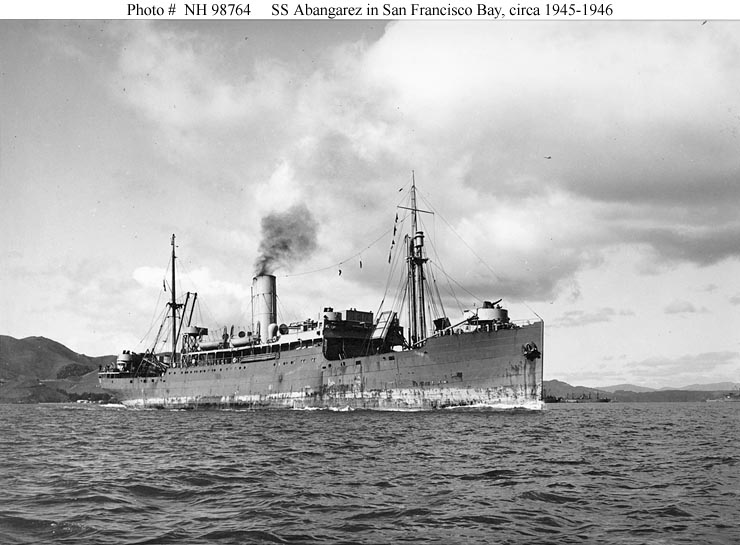
SS Abangarez, a United Fruit banana boat, circa 1945

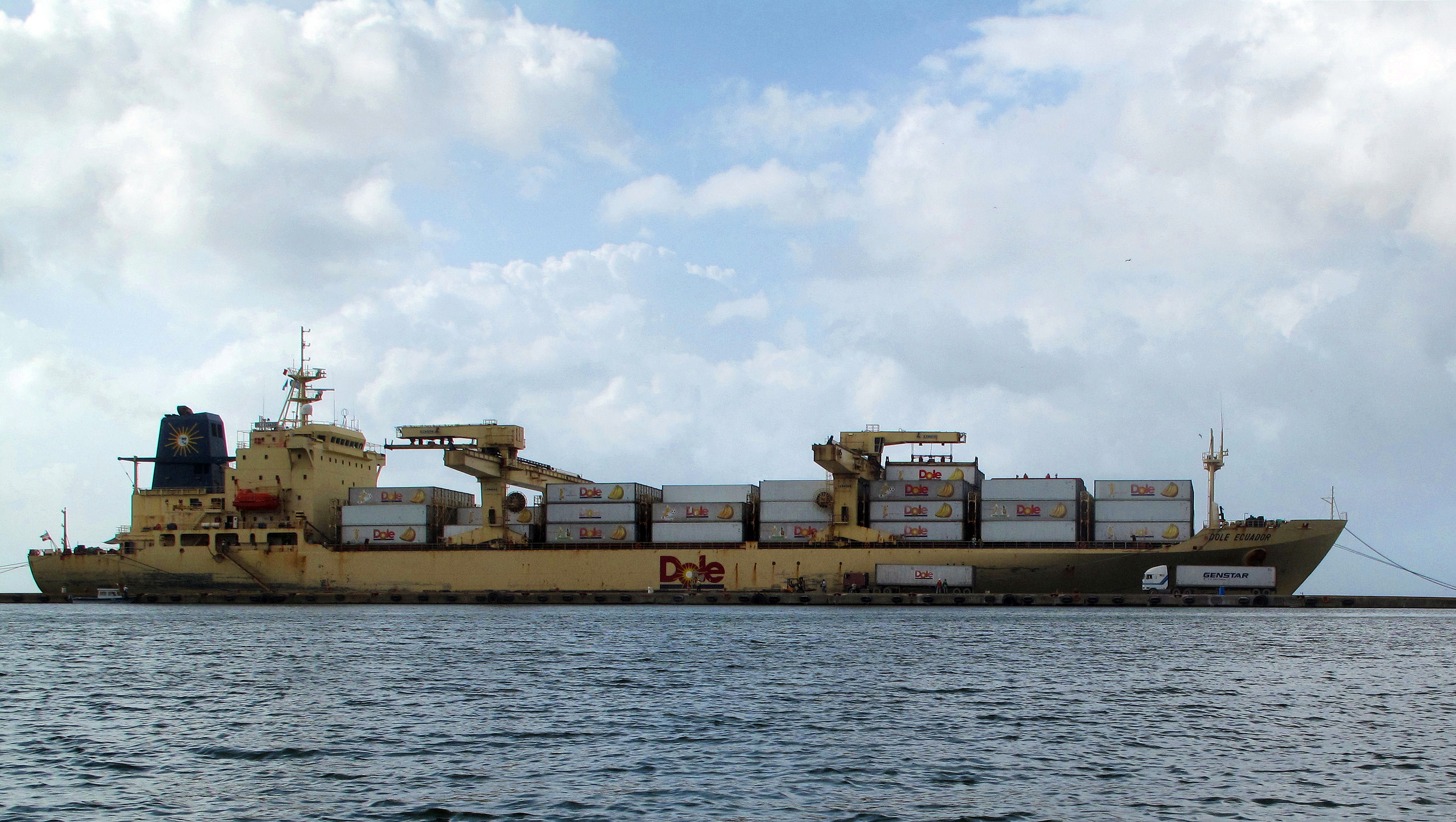
MV Dole Ecuador

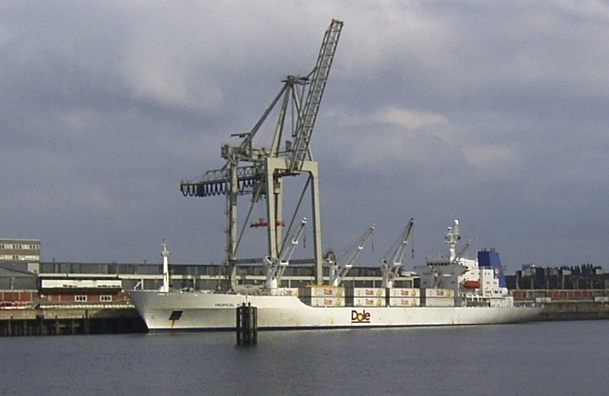
Dole's ship Tropical Mist, Hamburg port

== See also ==
- Banana republic
