= TSS Camito =

- TSS Camito c. 1956

History

United Kingdom
- Name: TSS Camito
- Owner: Fyffes Line
- Operator: Fyffes Line
- Route: Southampton or Avonmouth in England to Barbados, Trinidad and up to 5 ports in Jamaica (Kingston, Port Antonio, Montego Bay, Oracabessa and Bowdin)
- Builder: Alexander Stephen & Sons, Glasgow,
- Launched: 27 March 1956
- Identification: IMO number: 5059173
- Fate: Scrapped 1973

General characteristics
- Type: Passenger-cargo ship/Banana boat
- Tonnage: 8,687 GRT
- Length: 448 feet
- Speed: 18 kn (33 km/h; 21 mph)

TSS Camito was a passenger-carrying banana boat of the Fyffes Line. She measured 8,687 GRT and was the second ship to bear the name.

== History ==
She was built in 1956 by Alexander Stephen and Sons, of Glasgow, Scotland, and scrapped at Taiwan in 1973.

== Accommodation ==
She had three passenger decks with cabins for 96 first class passengers, public rooms and open-air deck spaces, centered between four large refrigerated cargo holds, two forward and two aft, that could handle 140,000 stems (1,750 tons) of bananas.

== Trade ==
Her main trade was general cargo outwards (mostly British manufactured goods), returning with bananas.

== Routing ==
She was routed on 4–5 week voyages from Southampton (rarely Avonmouth) in England to Trinidad (for bunkers); up to 5 ports on Jamaica (Kingston, Port Antonio, Montego Bay, Oracabessa and Bowden). She always started her run round the Jamaican coast by arriving at Kingston; and always finished at Port Antonio, which was an unusual loading port because she went alongside a dock. The intermediate Jamaican ports were less sophisticated then; and most of them loaded bananas through side-shell doors in the ship while she anchored in the bay (mostly at Oracabessa and Montego Bay) from lightering craft that were sculled out under one-man power. Loading took place 24 hours a day.

== Sister ship ==
There was a similar but much older vessel, the TSS Golfito, which was broadly of the same design. Together they provided a regular fortnightly service between Southampton Empress Dock (straight across from the Ocean Terminal, where the Queens docked regularly), to and from the West Indies.

== Name prefix ==
When new, she was known as TSS Camito. This was an abbreviation for "Twin Screw Ship". This was always her "official" designation by her owners, Elders and Fyffes (later to be Fyffes Group Ltd), though the shorter and more generic abbreviation SS (Steam Ship) was often used throughout her life.

== See also ==
- The Ships List: Elders & Fyffes.
