= USS Osborne =

Clemson-class destroyer

USS Osborne (DD-295)
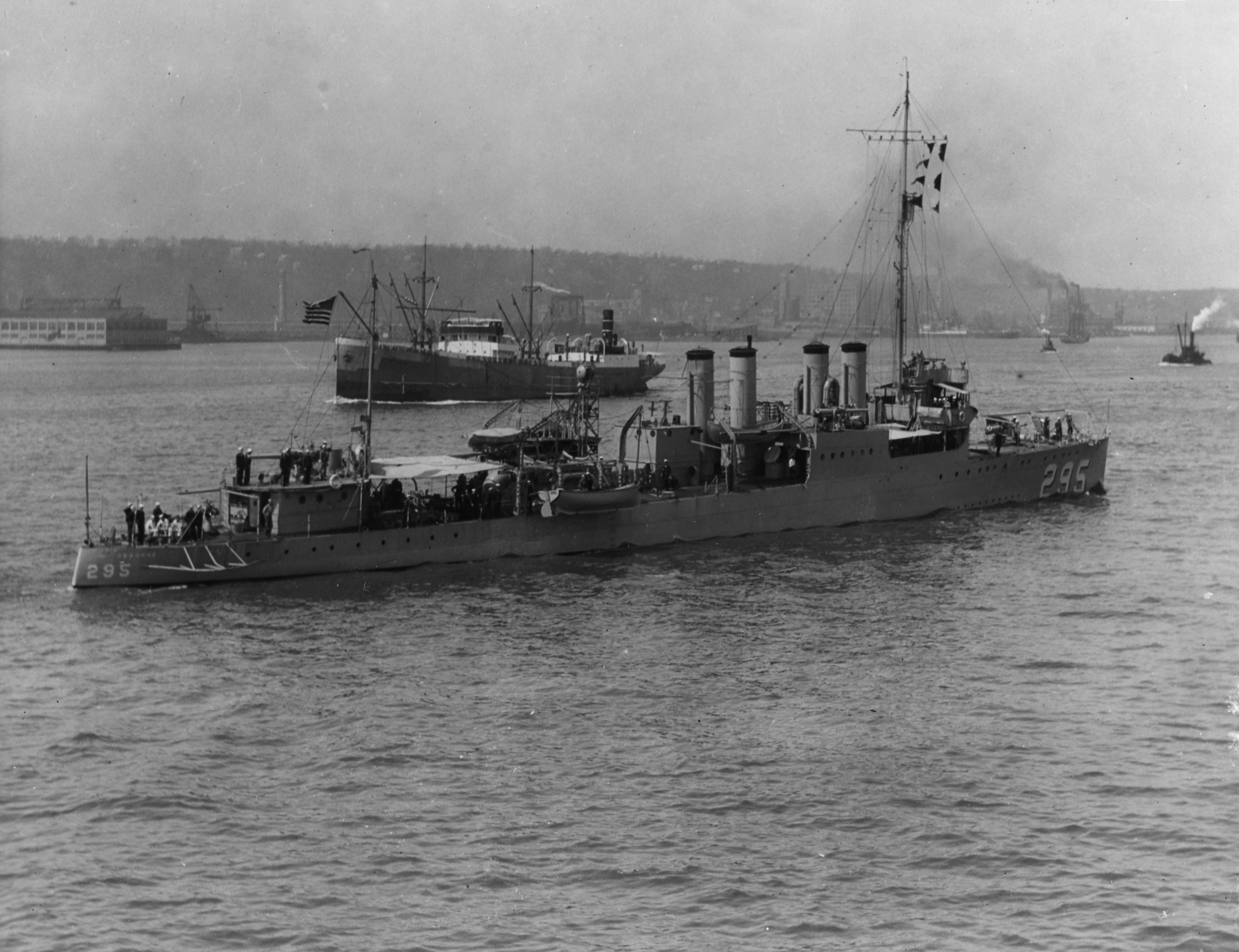
- USS Osborne underway in the Hudson River, during the 1920s.

History

United States
- Namesake: Weedon Osborne
- Builder: Bethlehem Shipbuilding Corporation, Squantum Victory Yard
- Laid down: 23 September 1919
- Launched: 29 December 1919
- Commissioned: 17 May 1920
- Decommissioned: 1 May 1930
- Stricken: 22 October 1930
- Fate: Sold 17 January 1931; Converted into cargo ship Matagalpa; Burned 26 June 1942; not repaired; Scuttled 6 September 1947

General characteristics
- Class & type: Clemson-class destroyer
- Displacement: 1,190 tons
- Length: 314 ft (96 m)
- Beam: 31 ft 8 in (9.65 m)
- Draft: 9 ft 4 in (2.84 m)
- Propulsion: 26,500 shp (19,800 kW); geared turbines, 2 screws
- Speed: 35 knots (65 km/h; 40 mph)
- Range: 4,900 nmi (9,100 km; 5,600 mi) at 15 knots (28 km/h; 17 mph)
- Complement: 120 officers and enlisted
- Armament: 4 × 4 in (102 mm)/50 guns; 1 × 3 in (76 mm)/25 guns; 12 × 21 inch (533 mm) torpedo tubes
- Notes: Ships were stripped to hulks before being rebuilt for commercial service with two new Ingersoll-Rand Diesel engines and all other systems.

USS Osborne (DD-295) was a Clemson-class destroyer in the United States Navy following World War I. She was named for Weedon Osborne.

== Naval Service ==
Osborne was laid down 23 September 1919 at Bethlehem Shipbuilding Corporation, Squantum, Massachusetts; launched 29 December 1919; co-sponsored by Mrs. Elizabeth Osborne Fisher, sister of Ltjg W. E. Osborne and Mrs. C. H. Cox; and commissioned 17 May 1920.

Commissioned into a peacetime navy curtailed by a retrenching Congress, the undermanned four-stacker departed Boston, Massachusetts 25 June to join DESRON 3, Atlantic Fleet. The limited coastal operations of 1920 were supplemented by 2 months of fleet exercises and battle problems off Cuba during the first quarter of 1921. Whether operating out of Charleston, South Carolina, her normal base of operations, or out of the Brooklyn or Philadelphia Navy Yards Osborne regularly steamed southward early each year for these competitive exercises and large scale tactical maneuvers. These useful testing periods brought a familiarization not only with the Caribbean area but also the Pacific coast of Panama. Under the new command of Raymond A. Spruance, Osborne steamed from Boston 18 June 1925, to "show the flag" on an extensive year-long cruise in the western half of the Mediterranean Sea and along the western European coastline.

On 20 September 1929 entered the Philadelphia Navy Yard for inactivation. Osborne decommissioned 1 May 1930 with her crew transferring to the newly recommissioned USS Taylor (DD-94). In accordance with the agreements reached at the London Naval Disarmament Conference of 1930, she was struck from the Navy List 22 October 1930 and sold for scrap 17 January 1931.

== Commercial service ==
The ship was sold to Standard Fruit Company of New Orleans where she was gutted to her hull and fitted with two new deck houses, electrical plant and other ship service plants and with dual 750 hp (560 kW) Ingersoll-Rand Diesel engines by Todd Dry Dock and Construction Company. With the new name Matagalpa and four holds capable of carrying a total of 25,000 banana stems between Central America and New Orleans the Standard Fruit & Steamship Company operated banana boat operated until the eve of World War II. The ship was surveyed and taken by the Navy under a bare boat charter until the urgent need to resupply the Philippines as Japanese forces took Manila resulted in their being taken over by the United States Army.

== U.S. Army service ==
On 22 February 1942 General MacArthur had requested direct support from Honolulu rather than Australia as it was lacking in resources. Within a day a very high level study of the situation concluded three old ex destroyers converted into fast commercial fruit carriers, now named Masaya, Matagalpa and Teapa, (Note: It is unclear from cited references currently in Wikipedia whether Teapa was ex-Putnam or ex-Worden. Four ships were converted to banana boat service of which three became fast Army transports. Weight of other references, in specialist forums and in Attempts to Supply The Philippines by Sea: 1942 by Charles Dana Gibson and E. Kay Gibson clearly have Putnam becoming Teapa.) and recently taken over under bare boat charter by the War Department with intentions to use them as inter-island transports would be suited to that supply requirement. Under urgent Presidential orders to support the forces in Bataan and Corregidor the Army began to prepare the ships to run the Japanese blockade of the Philippines. Cargoes were shipped to New Orleans for the three ships. They were originally due to sail on 28 February 1942 but difficulties, including securing naval gun crews to put on the ships, delayed sailing. Masaya sailed on 2 March 1942, Matagalpa on 11 March and Teapa on 18 March. While the situation in the Philippines became desperate the three ships were forced to stop in Los Angeles for repair. On 13 April General MacArthur reported blockade running was "useless," but the War Department decided to make the attempt. The ships were reloaded with Matagalpa loaded for Mindanao and arriving in Honolulu on 8 May 1942, too late to relieve Corregidor. Matagalpa and the other ships intended for supply of the Philippines, were diverted to Australia.

== Fate ==
On 26 June 1942 Matagalpa burned at her berth in Sydney, Australia, as over one hundred firefighters worked to unload gasoline drums and fight the fire. Matagalpa was not repaired and was scuttled in the "disposal area" off Sydney on 6 September 1947.

== Bibliography ==
- Rau, William M. (1990). "Question 47/88". Warship International. XXVII (4): 423. ISSN 0043-0374.
