= USS Putnam (DD-757) =

Allen M. Sumner-class destroyer

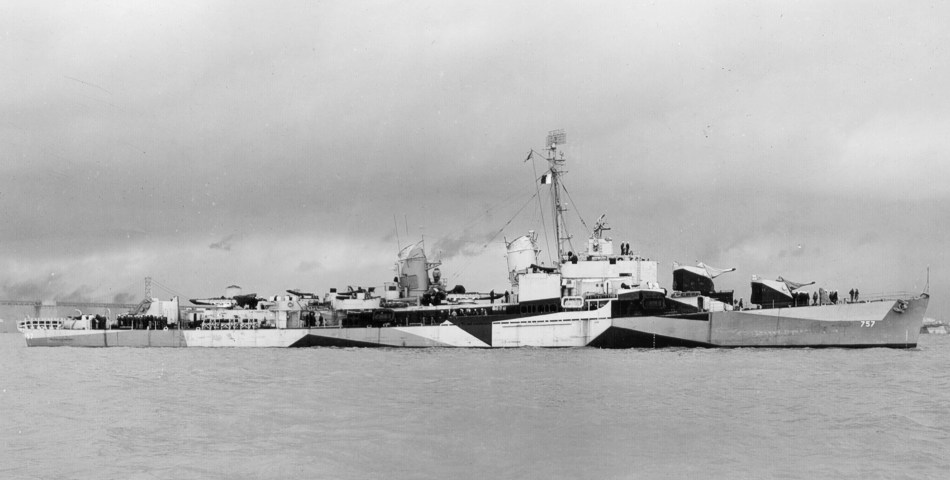
- USS Putnam

History

United States
- Name: Putnam
- Namesake: Charles Putnam
- Builder: Bethlehem Steel, San Francisco
- Laid down: 11 July 1943
- Launched: 26 March 1944
- Commissioned: 12 October 1944
- Decommissioned: 6 August 1973
- Stricken: 6 August 1973
- Motto: We've Been There
- Fate: Sold 24 June 1974 for scrap

General characteristics
- Class & type: Allen M. Sumner-class destroyer
- Displacement: 2,200 tons
- Length: 376 ft 6 in (114.76 m)
- Beam: 40 ft (12 m)
- Draft: 15 ft 8 in (4.78 m)
- Propulsion: 60,000 shp (45,000 kW); 2 propellers
- Speed: 34 knots (63 km/h; 39 mph)
- Range: 6,500 nmi (12,000 km; 7,500 mi) at 15 kn (28 km/h; 17 mph)
- Complement: 336
- Armament: 6 × 5 in (127 mm)/38 cal. guns, 12 × 40 mm AA guns, 11 × 20 mm AA guns, 10 × 21 inch (533 mm) torpedo tubes, 6 × depth charge projectors, 2 × depth charge tracks

USS Putnam (DD-757), an Allen M. Sumner-class destroyer, was the second ship of the United States Navy to be named for Charles Putnam. She was built and saw action in the Pacific during World War II. She was laid down on 11 July 1943 by Bethlehem Steel Co., Shipbuilding Division, San Francisco, California and launched on 26 March 1944; sponsored by Mrs. Doana Putnam Wheeler. The ship was commissioned on 12 October 1944. Cdr. Frederick V. H. Hilles was in command.

== Service history ==
=== World War II ===
Following shakedown off the Pacific Coast, Putnam glided beneath the Golden Gate Bridge on 30 December 1944 to take her place with the Pacific Fleet. Arriving Pearl Harbor 2 January 1945, the destroyer prepared for her first offensive operation, and got under way on 29 January for the Marianas Islands, screening the transports carrying 4th and 5th Marine Divisions.

Pausing briefly at Eniwetok, Saipan, and Tinian, the destroyer steamed from Guam 17 February in convoy en route to Iwo Jima. She arrived off Iwo Jima on D-Day (19 February) with the amphibious landing and battle underway. Gunfire support ships lying off-shore kept a thunderous rain of destruction pouring on the island.

Putnam inched in dangerously close to attack shore installations in support of the invading Marines and illuminated Japanese troop concentrations at night with star shells. On 23 February, Secretary of the Navy James Forrestal and a high-ranking Navy-Marine Corps party, after observing the initial phases of the landing, embarked in Putnam for transportation to Guam and a conference with Fleet Admiral Chester W. Nimitz.

Putnam departed Guam 12 March and escorted logistics ships to Leyte in the Philippine Islands, arriving five days later. She stood out of San Pedro Bay, Philippines 27 March and escorted a transport group to Okinawa; arriving Easter Sunday, the destroyer immediately took up anti-aircraft screening duties. After escorting a convoy to Ulithi, Putnam returned to Okinawa and was assigned a gunfire support station southwest of the island 16 April.

Later assigned to a radar picket station, Putnam vectored Navy fighters against kamikazes. She remained unscathed only because an unidentified American pilot crashed into a kamikaze on 16 June just seconds before it would have hit the destroyer.

Soon after sundown the same day, a torpedo dropped from a low-flying Japanese plane struck Twiggs to port and exploded her No. 2 magazine. Captain Glenn R. Hartwig, the squadron commander in Putnam, quickly closed. Exploding ammunition made rescue operations hazardous, but of 188 Twiggs survivors snatched from the sea, Putnam accounted for 114.

Putnam retired from Okinawa on 1 July 1945. Aircraft from the carriers of Task Force 38 were cutting Japanese supply lines in the East China Sea. Putnam's guns assisted in screening the carriers in these anti-shipping strikes, through 8 August 1945.

With the "cease hostilities" order of 15 August, the occupation of the Japanese home islands became the primary mission, and through the first week of September Putnam served as a guide and rescue destroyer for Tokyo-bound transport planes. She left her station, some 100 miles north of Okinawa, 13 September to serve in the escort for the battleship New Jersey as she steamed for Wakayama, on the central island of Honshū.

Putnam stood into Tokyo Bay 17 September, where she rode out a howling typhoon. She then made a return to Wakayama 25 September, thence to Okinawa 1 October, and then back to Wakayama. Steaming via Eniwetok 5 December, the destroyer touched at Pearl Harbor on 10 December for fuel, and dropped her hook at San Diego on 22 December.

Putnam received three battle stars for World War II service.

=== Post-war ===
Standing out of San Diego 3 January 1946, Putnam steamed for the New York Naval Shipyard, Brooklyn, for availability. She subsequently operated out of Newport, Rhode Island until the beginning of 1947, when she made Pensacola, Florida, her base. Late April 1947, Putnam called at Norfolk, Virginia, to be readied for a peacetime cruise to European waters.

Putnam was one of three destroyers assigned 19–25 April 1948 to the United Nations mediator, Count Folke Bernadotte, to attempt to maintain peace between Arab and Israeli forces during the 1948 Arab-Israeli War. When the truce temporarily broke down Putnam stood into Haifa 23 July to evacuate the UN team from that port. She was thus the first U.S. Navy ship to fly the United Nations flag.

After a brief period of decommissioned reserve status with the Atlantic Reserve Fleet, Putnam reactivated in October 1950. A Mediterranean cruise took her away from Norfolk from October 1951 through 4 June 1952. Local operations and overhaul were followed by Caribbean refresher training 21 May through 10 July 1953. Putnam departed Norfolk 25 September and transited the Suez Canal 15 October, arriving Yokosuka 10 November. She operated in the Sea of Japan and the East China Sea through 11 March 1954. Departing Midway 17 March, she touched at Pearl Harbor 21 March, called at various West Coast ports.

Putnam, in late 1954, had a prominent role in the movie The Bridges at Toko-Ri filmed on the West Coast, as the destroyer steaming alongside the USS Oriskany, receiving via transfer lines disciplinary-transferred helicopter pilot Mickey Rooney and aircrewman Earl Holliman. Putnam then transited the Panama Canal and arrived Norfolk 1 May.

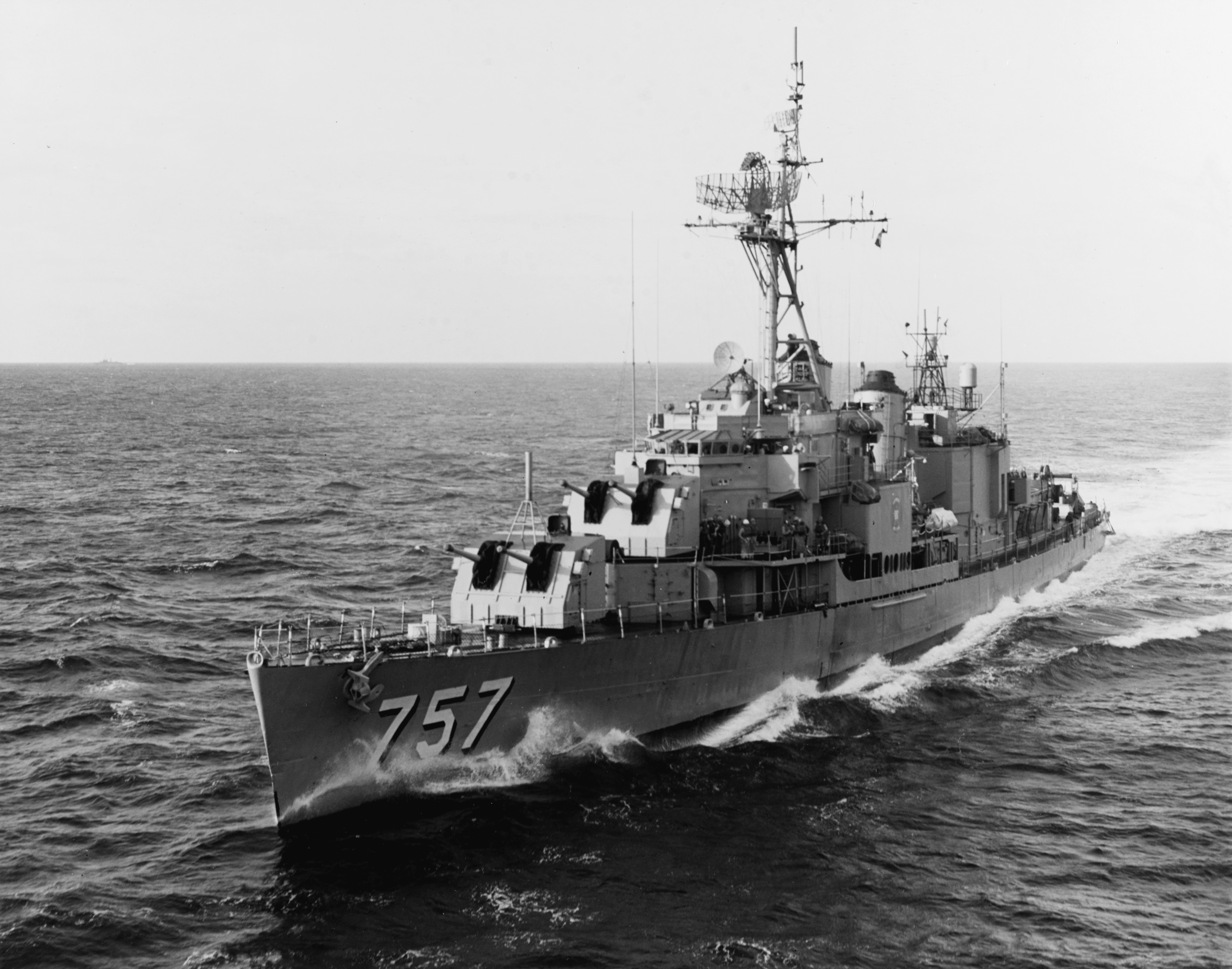
Putnam underway in 1964.

A round of training cruises and deployments ("Lantflex" 1–55) took Putnam from the East Coast to the Mediterranean and the Caribbean. Her 1955 and 1956 Mediterranean deployments were followed by NATO North Atlantic exercises late 1957. A September 1958 Mediterranean deployment was followed by overhaul at the Philadelphia Naval Shipyard.

Summer 1959 found Putnam participating in the first operation "Inland Seas" during which she steamed in all five of the Great Lakes. Between 1960 and 1969 the destroyer made nine annual deployments to the Mediterranean, interspersed with northern European operations, coast-wise trips, and visits to the Caribbean. In June 1962 she entered the New York Naval Shipyard for a FRAM II conversion, which was completed in March 1963.

Putnam continued active deployments to 1970.

After a short repair availability in Baltimore in mid-1970, USS Putnam was reassigned to New Orleans, Louisiana where she finished out her days performing the duties of a Reserve Trainer.(Crew member 1968-1970 )

On 6 August 1973, Putnam was decommissioned and struck from the Navy List. Within a year she was sold for scrapping.

Noted in the movie The Bridges of Toko-Ri used for under way replenishment with USS Oriskany (CV/CVA-34). The Bridges at Toko-Ri is a 1954 American war film about the Korean War and stars William Holden, Grace Kelly, Fredric March, Mickey Rooney, and Robert Straus
