= Fyffes Line =

UK fleet of passenger-carrying banana boats

Fyffes Line house flag circa 1970

Fyffes Line was the name given to the fleet of passenger-carrying banana boats owned and operated by the UK banana importer Elders & Fyffes Limited.

== History ==
With the formation of Elders & Fyffes Ltd in 1901 it was necessary to procure suitable ships on which to transport their bananas from the West Indies to the UK. Therefore, in 1902 when the Furness Line was anxious to sell three steamships each of 2,875 gross register tons (GRT), the new company raised the necessary funds to buy them. Named Appomattox, Chickahominy and Greenbriar, they were all refitted in Newcastle upon Tyne and a special cooling system installed to keep the fruit firm in the crossing. The first of these entered service later the same year as a banana boat and a fourth vessel, the Oracabessa, was also added to the fleet.

In 1904, three purpose built banana boats were ordered, each of 3,760 GRT. In 1910 the company came under the control of the United Fruit Company but retained its identity. The new ships also carried a small number of passengers in relative comfort, especially when compared to the Royal Mail steamers of that era. As such they have been acknowledged as playing a significant part in bringing the first tourists to Jamaica.

By the start of World War I, the Fyffes fleet had grown to 18 ships, but almost all were then requisitioned by the UK Government for war work. In the next four years ten ships were sunk by torpedoes or mines.

The company recovered quickly and less than five years after the war had achieved an even stronger position than it occupied in 1914. Then major problems arose; the 1923 dock strike and the Great Depression in the United Kingdom, a series of floods and hurricanes in Jamaica and the Spanish Civil War all produced their own difficulties. By 1938 the Fyffes fleet which had numbered 36 ships in 1932 was down to 21.

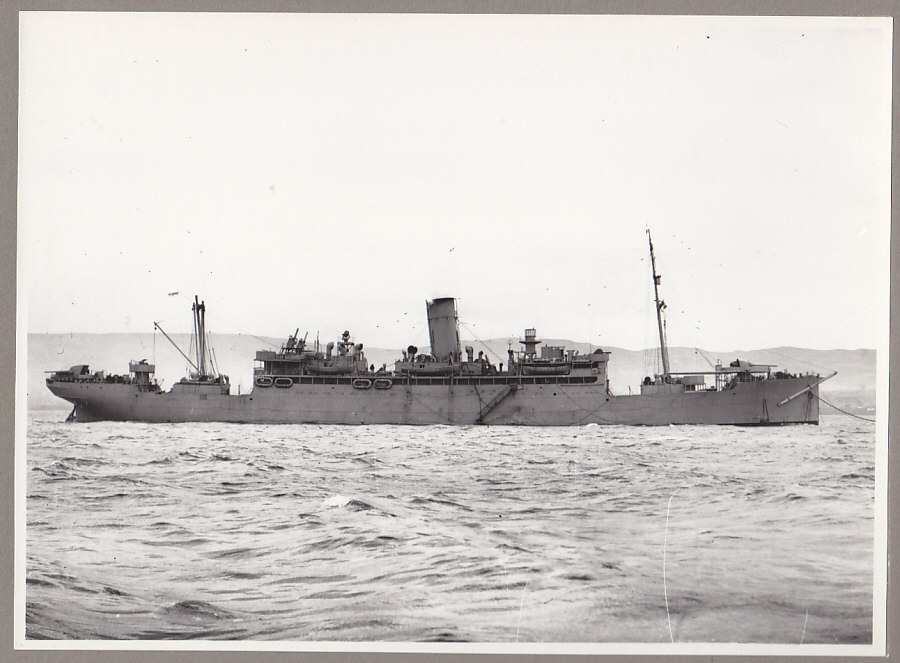
HMS Cavina, a 6,908 GRT Elders & Fyffes banana boat built in 1924 and converted into an ocean boarding vessel in 1940

By September 1939 there had been 56 ships which had flown the Fyffes flag in the previous 38 years. In the next six years of World War II, 14 ships were lost at sea.

In November 1940 the UK Government imposed a total ban on the import of bananas, having decided that the only fruit that could be imported for the duration of the war was oranges. This ban continued until 30 December 1945 when the SS Tilapa, flying the Fyffes Line flag, arrived in the UK with the first cargo of bananas to be seen for over five years.

After the war, Fyffes regularly carried distinguished passengers on its ships including Princess Alice, Countess of Athlone, who, as Chancellor of the University of the West Indies, made frequent visits to Jamaica, and the West Indies Cricket Team who came to play test cricket matches in England. The team always ended its visit by playing a private game against Elders & Fyffes' own cricket team at the company’s sports ground in New Malden, Surrey.

Fyffes had two final ships built: TSS Golfito (1949) and TSS Camito (1956), which together provided a fortnightly service between the UK and the Caribbean until the company's withdrawal from ship-owning in the early 1970s. Thereafter its fleet acquisitions were second-hand ships, such as three turbo-electric cargo and passenger liners from the early 1930s that the United Fruit Company transferred to Fyffes in 1958. They were Quirigua, Talamanca and Veragua, which Fyffes renamed Samala, Sulaco and Sinaloa respectively.

== Sources ==
- Beaver, Patrick (1976). Yes! We have some: The story of Fyffes. Publications for Companies. ISBN 978-0-904928-02-0.
