= USS Dale (DD-290) =

Clemson-class destroyer

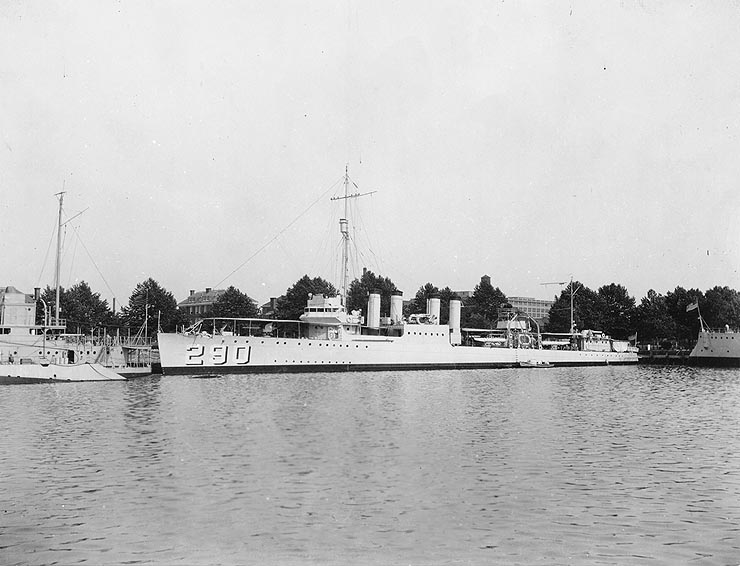
- USS Dale at the Philadelphia Naval Yard on 11 June 1926

History

United States
- Name: Dale
- Namesake: Richard Dale
- Builder: Bethlehem Shipbuilding Corporation, Squantum Victory Yard
- Laid down: 28 July 1919
- Launched: 19 November 1919
- Commissioned: 16 February 1920
- Decommissioned: 1 May 1930
- Stricken: 22 October 1930
- Fate: Sold 17 January 1931; Became commercial cargo ship Masaya; Sunk 28 March 1943

General characteristics
- Class & type: Clemson-class destroyer
- Tonnage: 1,174 GRT as Masaya
- Displacement: 1,190 tons
- Length: 314 ft 5 in (95.8 m)
- Beam: 31 ft 8 in (9.7 m)
- Draft: 9 ft 3 in (2.8 m)
- Propulsion: 26,500 shp (19,800 kW); geared turbines, 2 screws
- Speed: 35 knots (65 km/h; 40 mph); Converted to motor power plant as Masaya
- Range: 4,900 nmi (9,100 km; 5,600 mi) at 15 knots (28 km/h; 17 mph)
- Complement: 120 officers and enlisted
- Armament: 4 × 4 in (102 mm)/50 guns; 2 × 3 in (76 mm)/25 guns; 4 × 21 in (533 mm) torpedo tubes
- Notes: Navy stripped ship of "propelling machinery, war gear, shafting, propellers and struts" before sale. Conversion involved total new power plant

The third USS Dale (DD-290) was a Clemson-class destroyer in the United States Navy. She was named for Richard Dale.

== Service history ==
=== United States Navy ===
Dale was launched 19 November 1919 by Bethlehem Shipbuilding Corporation, Squantum, Massachusetts; sponsored by Mrs. A. J. Peters; and commissioned 16 February 1920.

From 3 March to 3 April 1920 Dale patrolled New England waters aiding in the recalibration of radio compass stations in the 1st Naval District. Assigned to Destroyer Force, U.S. Atlantic Fleet, she operated with destroyer squadrons along the Atlantic coast, in the Gulf of Mexico, and in the Caribbean Sea. Her activities included tactical exercises and battle practice; fleet maneuvers, war exercises, and fleet search problems; training naval reservists; and service from Norfolk, Virginia in the calibration of radio compass stations in the 5th Naval District.

On 17 June 1924 Dale sailed from Newport, Rhode Island under the command of William F. Halsey, Jr. to make courtesy visits to ports in Germany, Denmark, Norway, Scotland, England, France, Spain, and Portugal. Arriving at Gibraltar on 21 September, she cruised in the Mediterranean Sea until June, engaging in battle practice, intelligence work, and international goodwill calls. She departed Gibraltar on 2 July 1925 for New York City, arriving on 16 July.

Dale operated with Destroyer Squadrons, Scouting Fleet, on the United States East Coast, in the Caribbean, and in the Panama Canal Zone until arrival at Philadelphia, on 21 September 1929. She was decommissioned there on 1 May 1930 and sold on 17 January 1931.

=== Commercial banana boat ===
The destroyer equipped with a new propulsion plant, converted to a banana carrier and renamed MV Masaya operating for the Standard Fruit and Steamship Co., of New Orleans, Louisiana from 1933.

=== United States Army and fate ===
With the Philippines cut off by Japanese forces the War Department attempted to use blockade runners. Some were to make the attempt from Australia or Java, but some were to make the attempt directly from the United States. One recommendation, carried directly to the President of the United States, was the acquisition by bareboat charter and use of three World War I destroyers that had been converted to fast banana carriers, one immediately available in New Orleans. Cargos for two other vessels, then in the Caribbean, were to be sent to await their availability in New Orleans. Delays occurred, but Masaya departed New Orleans on 2 March 1942 with Matagalpa following on 11 March and Teapa on 18 March. All were delayed for repairs in Los Angeles with reloading for Corregidor. They reached Hawaii too late to relieve Corregidor. The ship was instead sent to the Southwest Pacific Area, entering the Southwest Pacific Area command's permanent local fleet on 12 March 1942, where in an effort to support operations in Buna she was bombed and sunk five miles to the east of Oro Bay, New Guinea on 28 March 1943. Casualties were 10 killed + 1 DOW/4 wounded

== Bibliography ==
- Naval History And Heritage Command. "Dale III". Dictionary of American Naval Fighting Ships. Naval History And Heritage Command.
- Fetterly, Don (17 February 2013). "The Saga of SS Masaya". Pacific Wrecks. Archived from the original on 23 October 2013.
- Gill, G. Hermon (1968). Royal Australian Navy 1939–1942. Australia in the War of 1939–1945. Series 2 – Navy. Vol. 2. Canberra: Australian War Memorial. Archived from the original on 27 September 2013.
- Lloyds (1934–1935). "Lloyd's Register" (PDF). Lloyd's Register (through PlimsollShipData).
- Masterson, Dr. James R. (1949). U. S. Army Transportation in the Southwest Pacific Area 1941–1947. Washington, D. C.: Transportation Unit, Historical Division, Special Staff, U. S. Army.
- Morton, Lewis (1993). The War in the Pacific: The Fall Of The Philippines. United States Army in World War II. Washington, D.C.: Center of Military History, United States Army. LCCN 53-63678.
- Rau, William M. (1990). "Question 47/88". Warship International. XXVII (4): 423. ISSN 0043-0374.
