= Charles F. Putnam =

American US Navy officer

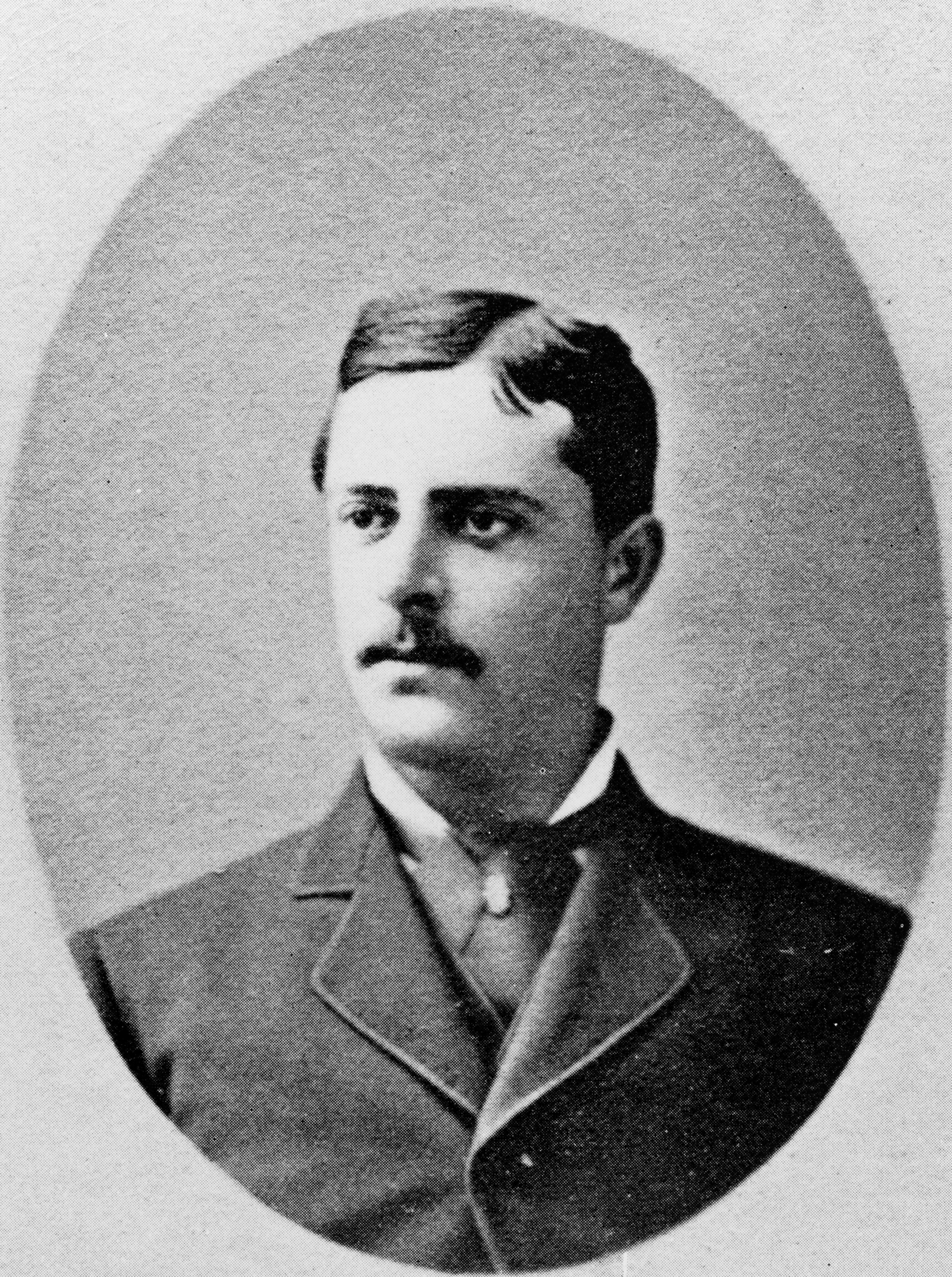
- Born: Charles Flint Putnam; December 1, 1854; Freeport, Illinois, U.S.
- Died: January 10, 1882 (aged 27) Cape Serdtse-Kamen, Russia
- Allegiance: United States
- Branch: United States Navy
- Education: United States Naval Academy

Charles Flint Putnam (1 December 1854 – c. 10 January 1882) was an officer in the United States Navy.

== Biography ==
Born in Freeport, Illinois, Putnam entered the United States Naval Academy at the age of 14. Upon his request at graduation in 1873, he was ordered to the Far East on USS Kearsarge, serving in that vessel with the Asiatic Squadron until 1875. Master Putnam was stationed at San Francisco, California, in 1876 and was attached to schoolship USS Jamestown from 1877 to 1878.

In 1879, he joined the Coast Survey steamer Hassler in the North Pacific. Putnam volunteered in 1881 for service in USS Rodgers, fitted out to search for USS Jeannette, which had been lost in the Arctic on an expedition to reach the North Pole. When Rodgers burned at Saint Lawrence Bay, Chukotka, on 30 November 1881, Putnam took supplies to the survivors on dog sledges.

On his return to his depot at Cape Serdze, he missed his way in a blinding snow storm 10 January 1882, drifted out to sea on an ice-floe and was never heard from again.

== Namesakes ==
Three ships have been named USS Putnam for him.
