= USS Putnam (DD-287) =

Clemson-class destroyer

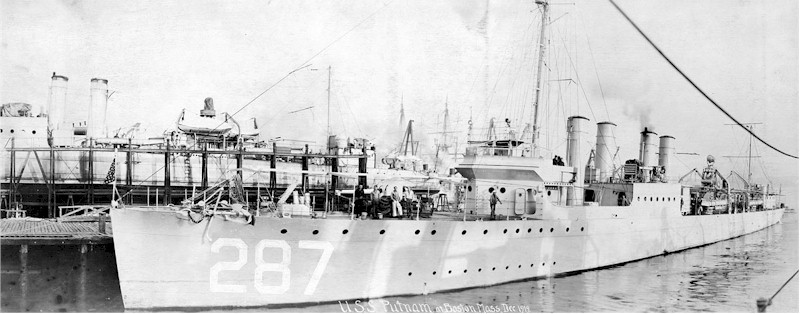

History

United States
- Namesake: Charles Putnam
- Builder: Bethlehem Shipbuilding Corporation, Squantum Victory Yard
- Laid down: 30 June 1919
- Launched: 30 September 1919
- Commissioned: 18 December 1919
- Decommissioned: 21 September 1929
- Stricken: 22 October 1930
- Fate: Sold for scrap, 17 January 1931

General characteristics
- Class & type: Clemson-class destroyer
- Displacement: 1,190 tons
- Length: 314 feet 5 inches (95.83 m)
- Beam: 31 feet 8 inches (9.65 m)
- Draft: 9 feet 3 inches (2.82 m)
- Propulsion: 26,500 shp (20 MW); geared turbines, 2 screws
- Speed: 34 knots (63 km/h)
- Range: 4,900 nmi (9,100 km); @ 15 kt
- Complement: 120 officers and enlisted
- Armament: 4 × 4 in (102 mm)/50 guns, 1 × 3 in (76 mm)/25 gun, 12 × 21 inch (533 mm) torpedo tubes

USS Putnam (DD-287) was a Clemson-class destroyer in the United States Navy following World War I. She was named for Charles Putnam.

== History ==
Putnam was laid down by the Bethlehem Shipbuilding Corporation, Squantum, Massachusetts 30 June 1919, launched 30 September 1919, sponsored by Miss Katherine Brown; and commissioned at Boston, Massachusetts 18 December 1919.

Upon completion of shakedown out of Boston, Putnam was assigned to Division 43, Squadron 3, Destroyer Force Atlantic Fleet based at Newport, Rhode Island. She sailed from Newport 8 February 1920 for Guantanamo Bay where she carried out target practice until 26 April. Putnam was later sent to Tampico, Mexico, to join Isherwood and Reid in observing the volatile political situation there 10 May – 14 June. She made a reservist training cruise between Philadelphia and Newport before being placed in reserve at Charleston 22 September.

Putnam was reassigned to Destroyer Division 49, Squadron 1 upon returning to active duty 1 May 1921 and took part in summer exercises with the Destroyer Force out of Newport until 16 November. After spending the winter in reserve at Charleston, South Carolina, she was ordered to Destroyer Division 25 Squadron 9 at Newport 27 June 1922. Putnam engaged in gunnery drills at Guantanamo Bay (16 April – 25 May 1923) before returning to Boston for periodic overhaul. She rejoined her division at Guantanamo Bay 5 April 1924 for maneuvers with Scouting Fleet Destroyers there and later off Hampton Roads until 29 October. Putnam rendezvoused with the fleet for torpedo exercises in the Caribbean again 6 January – 10 February 1925.

Following repairs at Boston (14 February – 1 July 1925), Putnam reported to the Newport Naval Torpedo Station for experimental duty and participated in the search to locate the wreck of USS S-51 on 26 September. She departed Newport 2 October for Gonaïves, Haiti, Guantanamo Bay and the Panama Canal Zone to continue her readiness operations with Scouting Fleet Destroyers. Putnam sailed for Boston 20 February 1926 for a refit.

Upon completion of repairs at Boston 28 April 1926, Putnam resumed her schedule of experimental torpedo duty at Newport and fleet maneuvers off Haiti until October 1927. She then proceeded to Charleston for Fleet Problem II (30 October – 2 December).

After exercises off Haiti in January and February, Putnam completed three reservists' training cruises between Philadelphia and Newport (30 June – 24 August) before sailing 31 August for Charleston and depth charge practice. She resumed operations in Panamanian waters 16 January 1929, participated in Fleet Problem IX, transited and retransmitted the Panama Canal and later engaged in gunnery drills off Haiti before sailing for Boston 27 April. Putnam served as a reservists' training ship for two cruises out of Tompkinsville, New York (19 July – 30 August).

== Fate ==
Putnam decommissioned at Philadelphia 21 September 1929; was struck from the Navy List 22 October 1930, sold 17 January 1931. The ship was converted to the MV Teapa that was acquired by the Army in an effort to resupply Corregidor.

== Bibliography ==
- Rau, William M. (1990). "Question 47/88". Warship International. XXVII (4): 423. ISSN 0043-0374.
