= Reefer ship =

Refrigerated cargo ship

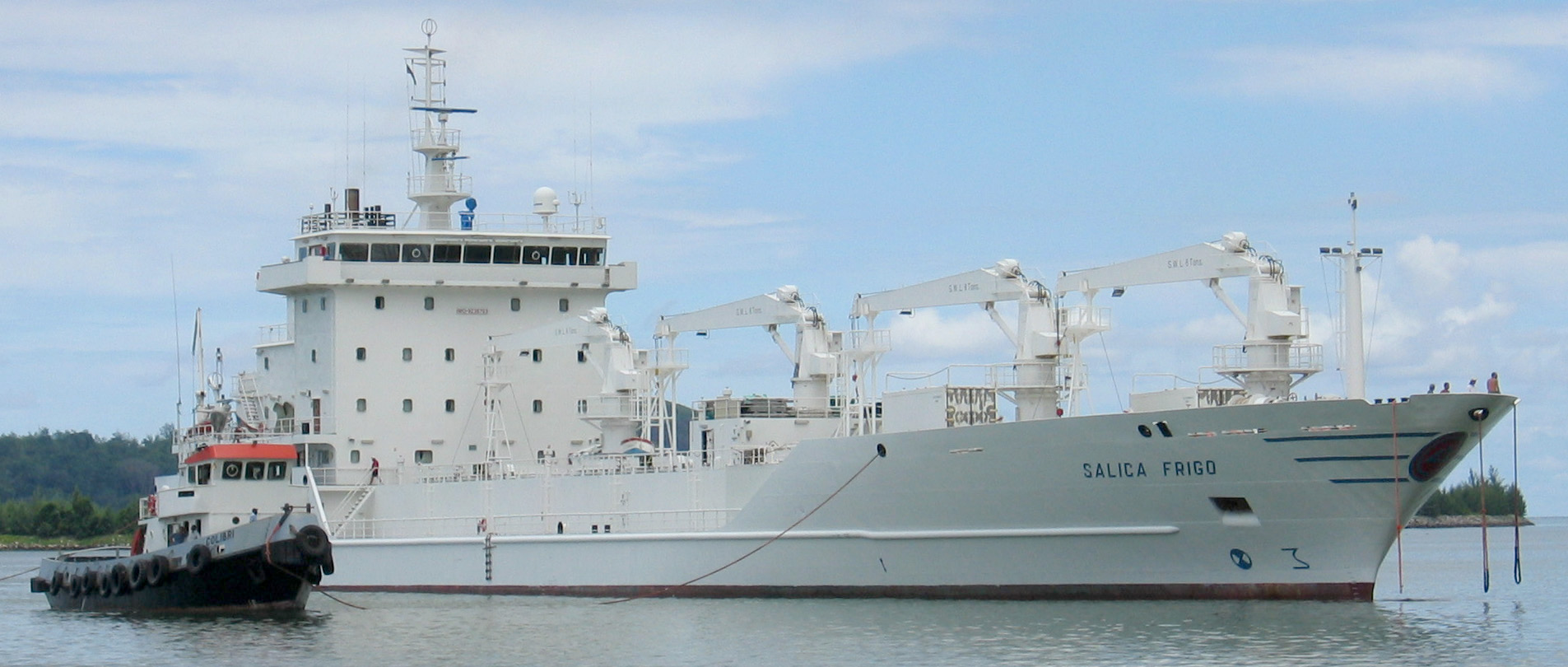
Reefer Salica Frigo

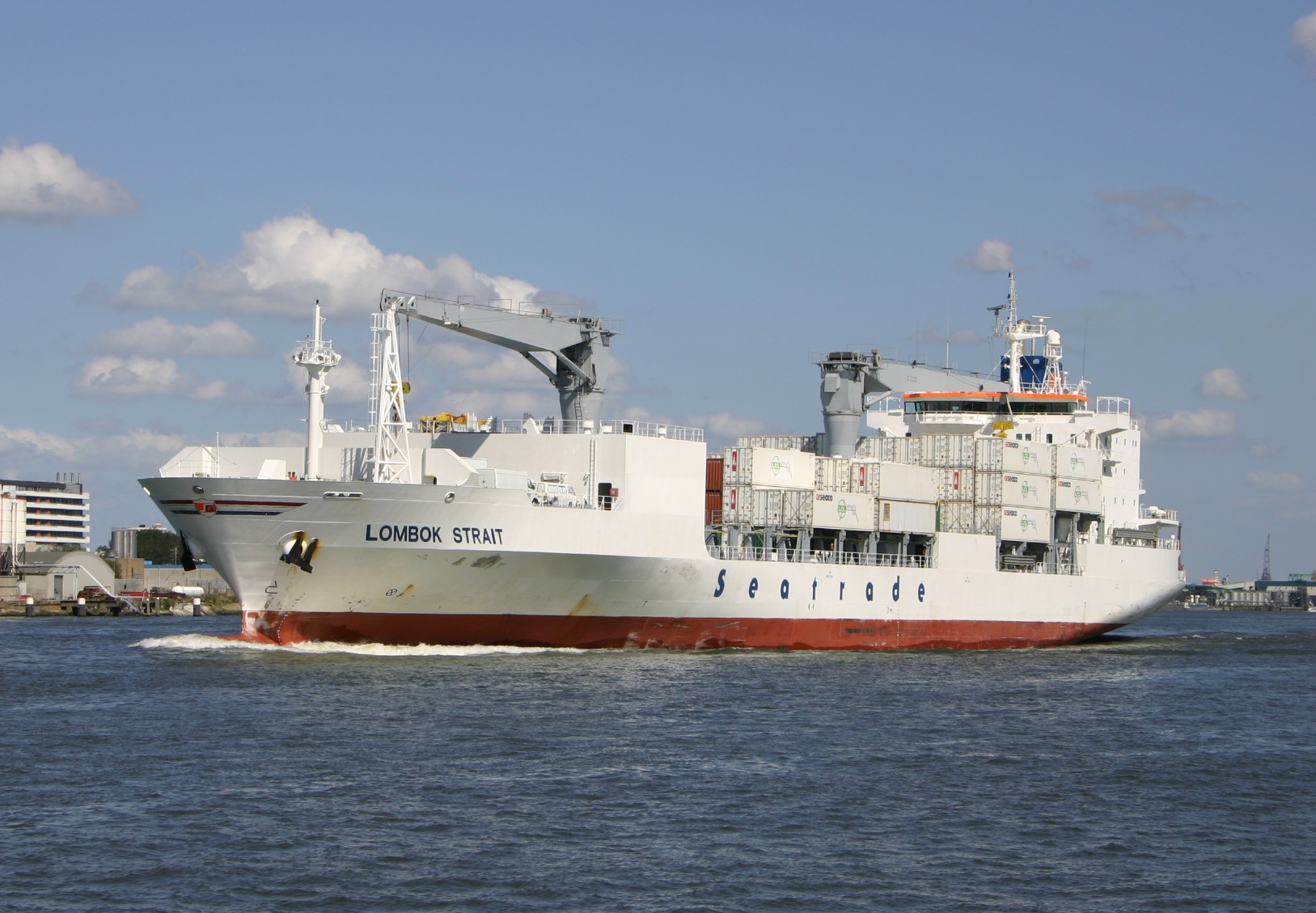
Reefer Lombok Strait of SeaTrade

A refrigerated cargo ship, also known as a reefer ship, is a refrigerated cargo ship typically used to transport perishable cargo, which require temperature-controlled handling, such as fruits, meat, vegetables, dairy products, and similar items.

== Description ==
Types of reefers: Reefer ships may be categorised into three types:

1. Side-door vessels have water-tight ports on the ship's hull, which open into a cargo hold. Elevators or ramps leading from the quay serve as loading and discharging access for the forklifts or conveyors. Inside these access ports or side doors, pallet lifts or another series of conveyors bring the cargo to the respective decks. This special design makes the vessels particularly well suited for inclement weather operations as the tops of the cargo holds are always closed against rain and sun.
2. Conventional vessels have a traditional cargo operation with top opening hatches and cranes/derricks. On such ships, when facing wet weather, the hatches need to be closed to prevent heavy rain from flooding the holds. Both above ship types are well suited for the handling of palletized and loose cargo.
3. Refrigerated container ships are specifically designed to carry containerised unit loads where each container has its individual refrigerated unit. These containers are nearly always twenty-foot equivalent units (often called TEU) that are the size of "standard" cargo containers that are loaded and unloaded at container terminals and aboard container ships. These ships differ from conventional container ships in their design, power generation, and electrical distribution equipment. They need provisions made for powering each container's cooling system. Because of their ease of loading and unloading cargo many container ships are now being built or redesigned to carry refrigerated containers.

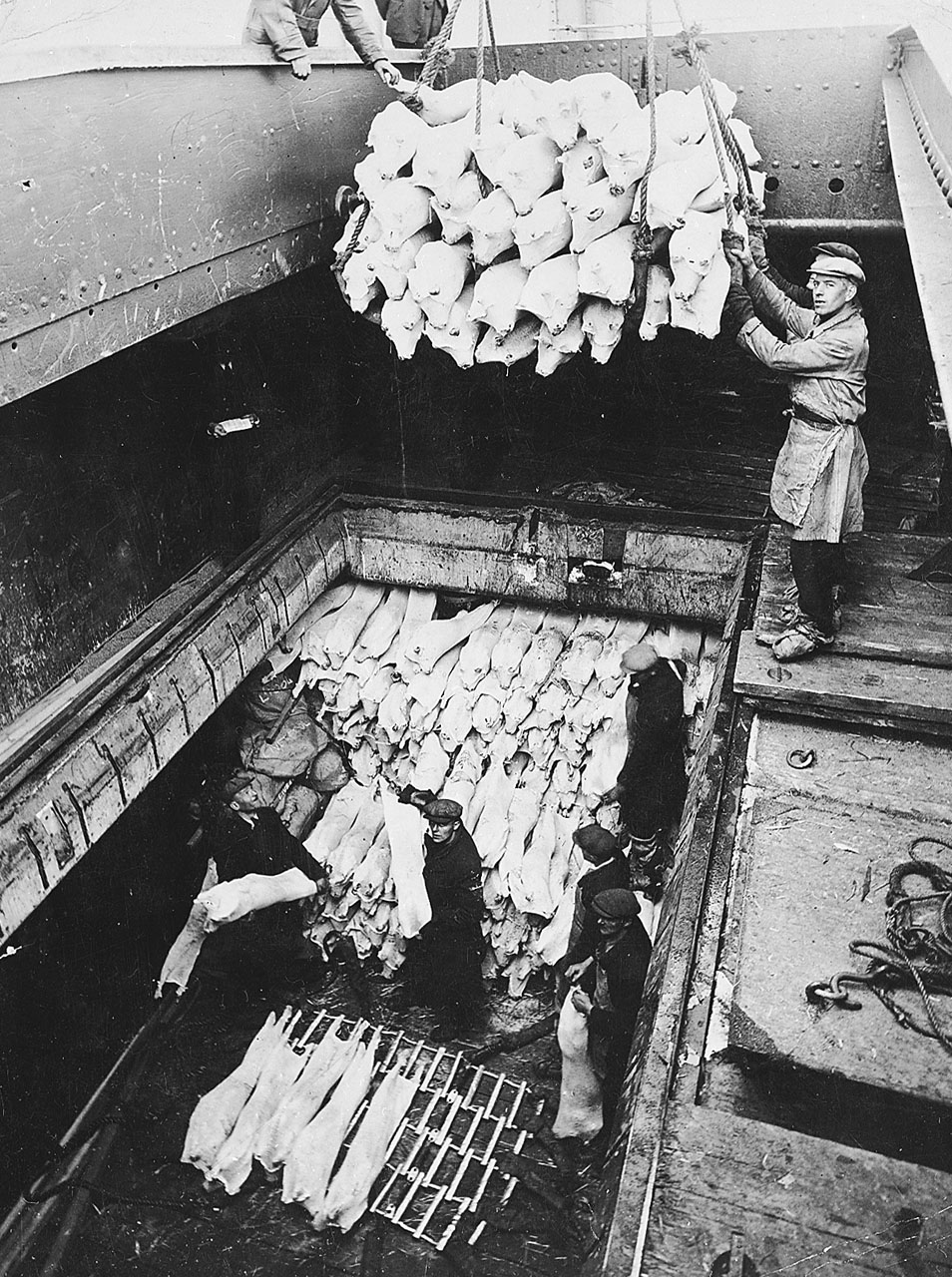
Unloading frozen pork from the Clan Line ship Clan MacDougall in the mid-20th century

A major use of refrigerated cargo hold type ships was for the transportation of bananas and frozen meat, but most of these ships have been partly replaced by refrigerated containers that have a refrigeration system attached to the rear end of the container. While on a ship these containers are plugged into an electrical outlet (typically 440 VAC) that ties into the ship's power generation. Refrigerated container ships are not limited by the number of refrigeration containers they can carry, unlike other container ships which may be limited in their number of refrigeration outlets or have insufficient generator capacity. Each reefer container unit is typically designed with a stand-alone electrical circuit and has its own breaker switch that allows it to be connected and disconnected as required. In principle each individual unit could be repaired while the ship was still underway.

Refrigerated cargo is a key part of the income for some shipping companies. On multi-purpose ships, refrigerated containers are mostly carried above deck, as they have to be checked for proper operation. Also, a major part of the refrigeration system (such as a compressor) may fail, which would have to be replaced or unplugged quickly in the event of a fire. Modern container vessels stow the reefer containers in cellguides with adjacent inspection walkways that enable reefer containers to be carried in the holds as well as on the deck. Modern refrigerated container vessels are designed to incorporate a water-cooling system for containers stowed under deck. This does not replace the refrigeration system but facilitates cooling down of the external machinery. Containers stowed on the exposed upper deck are air-cooled, while those under deck are water-cooled. The water cooling design allows additional refrigerated containers under deck, as water can be used to dissipate the high amount of heat they generate. This system draws fresh water from the ship's water supply, which in turn transfers the heat through heat exchangers to the abundantly available sea water.

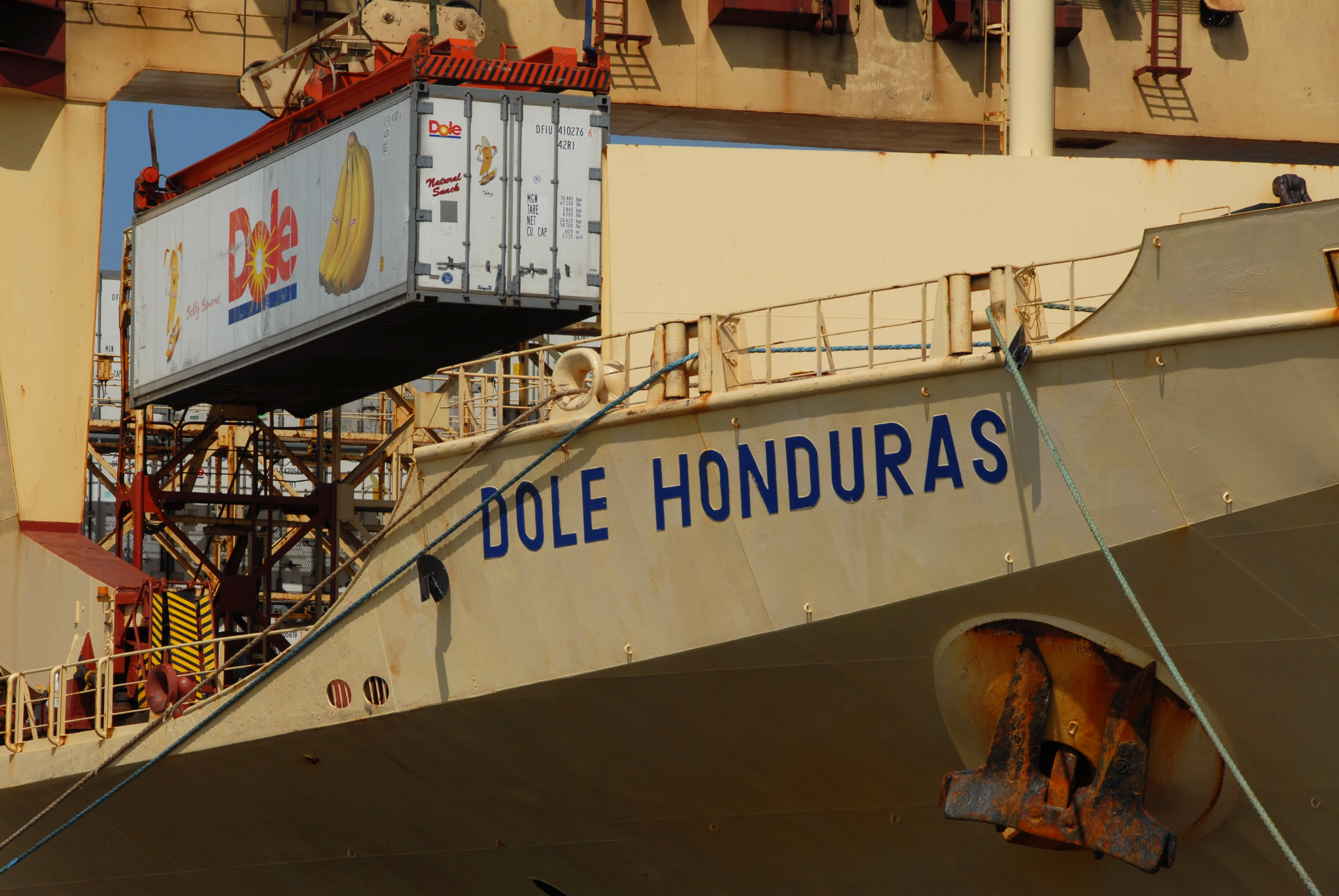
The reefer ship Dole Honduras unloading bananas in the Port of San Diego

There are also refrigeration systems that have two compressors for very precise and low-temperature operations, such as transporting a container of blood to a war zone. Cargoes of shrimp, asparagus, caviar and blood are considered among the most expensive refrigerated items. Bananas, fruit and meat have historically been the main cargo of refrigerated ships.

== History of ship refrigeration ==
In 1869, reefers were shipping beef carcasses frozen in a salt-ice mixture from Indianola, Texas, to New Orleans, Louisiana, to be served in hospitals, hotels, and restaurants. In 1874, shipping of frozen beef from America to London had already begun, which developed into an annual tonnage of around 10,000 short tons (8,900 long tons; 9,100 t). The insulated cargo space was cooled by ice, which was loaded on departure. The success of this method was limited by insulation, loading techniques, ice block size, distance and climate.

The first attempt to ship refrigerated meat across the Pacific was made when the Northam sailed from Australia to the UK in 1876. The refrigeration machinery broke down en route and the cargo was lost.

In the same 1876, French inventor Charles Tellier bought the ex-Elder-Dempster a 690 tons cargo ship Eboe and fitted a Methyl-ether refrigerating plant of his design. The ship was renamed Le Frigorifique and successfully imported a cargo of refrigerated meat from Argentina. However the machinery could be improved and in 1877 another refrigerated ship called Paraguay with a refrigerating plant improved by Ferdinand Carré was put into service on the South American run. Paraguay completed the first successful travel with its shipment of 5500 frozen muttons from Argentina arriving to France in excellent condition despite a collision that delayed the delivery for several months, thus proving the concept of refrigerated ships, if not the economics. In 1879, Strathleven, equipped with compression refrigeration, sailed successfully from Sydney to the UK with 40 tons of frozen beef and mutton as a small part of her cargo.

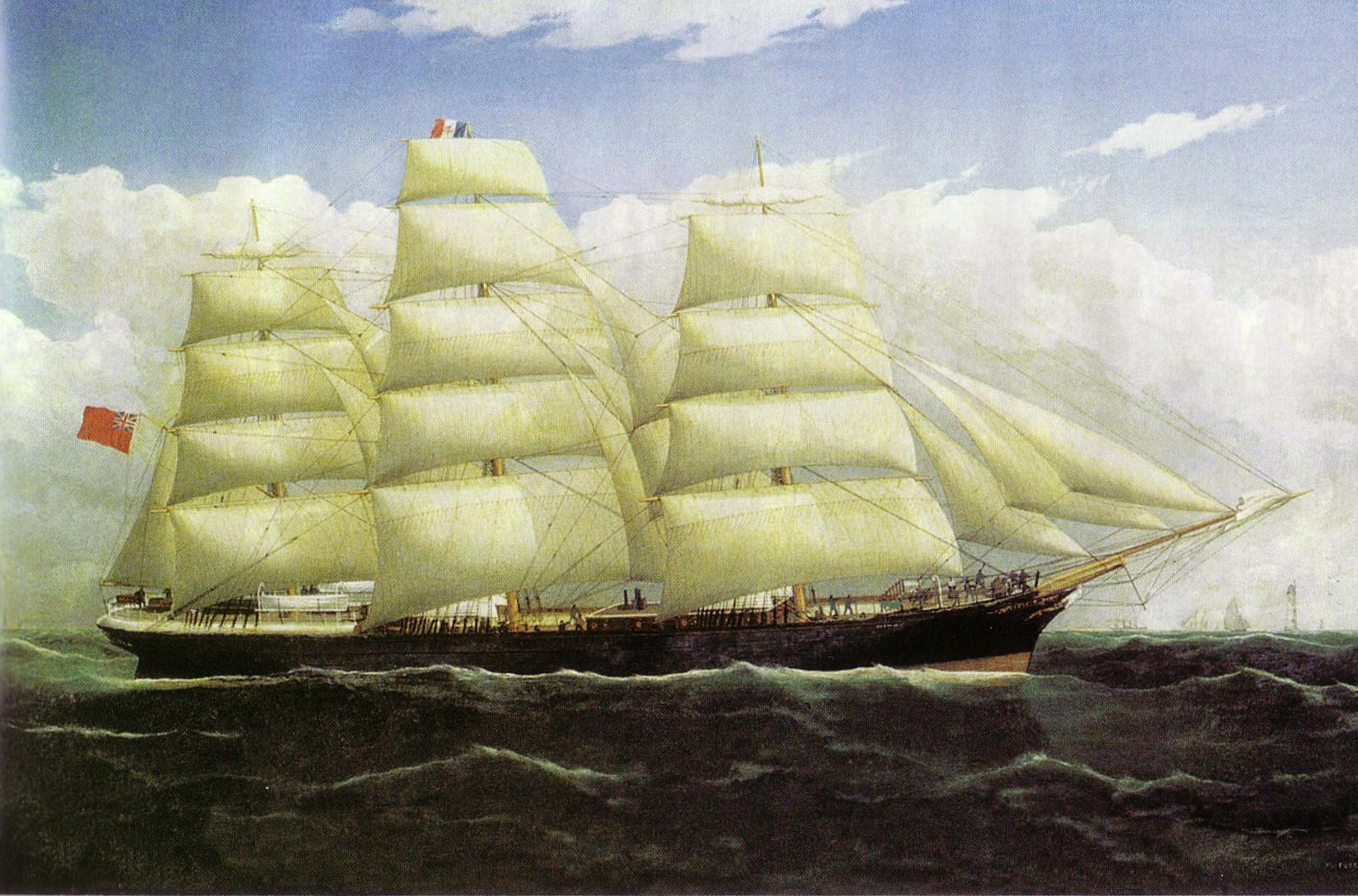
Dunedin, first refrigerated clipper ship to complete a successful shipment of refrigerated meat

The clipper sailing ship Dunedin, owned by the New Zealand and Australian Land Company (NZALC), was refitted in 1881 with a Bell-Coleman compression refrigeration machine. This freezer unit worked by compressing air, then releasing it into the hold of the ship. The expanding air absorbed heat as it expanded, cooling the cargo in the hold. Burning three tons of coal a day in the steam engine that ran the compressor, it could lower the temperature of the hold by 40 °F (22 °C) compared to the surrounding air temperature, which froze the cargo in the temperate climate of southern New Zealand and then maintained it below freezing (32 °F, 0 °C) through the tropics. Dunedin's most visible sign of being an unusual ship was the funnel for the refrigeration plant placed between her fore and main masts (sometimes leading her to be mistaken for a steamship which had been common since the 1840s). In February 1882, Dunedin sailed from Port Chalmers, New Zealand, with 4,331 mutton, 598 lamb and 22 pig carcasses, 246 kegs of butter, and hare, pheasant, turkey, chicken and 2,226 sheep tongues. It arrived in London after sailing 98 days with its cargo still frozen. After meeting all costs, the NZALC company made a £4,700 profit from the voyage.

Soon after Dunedin's successful voyage, an extensive frozen meat trade from New Zealand and Australia to the UK was developed with over 16 different refrigerated and passenger refrigerated ships built or refitted by 1900 in Scotland and Northern England shipyards for this trade. Within 5 years, 172 shipments of frozen meat were sent from New Zealand to the United Kingdom. Refrigerated shipping also led to a broader meat and dairy boom in Australia, New Zealand and Argentina. Frozen meat and dairy exports continue to form the backbone of New Zealand's economy.

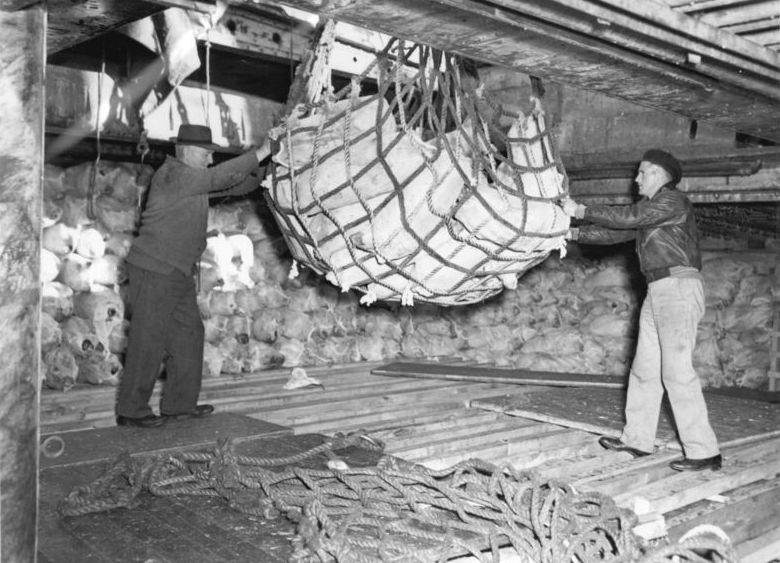
Loading Clan McDougall with frozen meat for England (Archives New Zealand)

The Nelson brothers, butchers in County Meath, Ireland, started shipping extensive live beef shipments to Liverpool, England. They successfully expanded their beef business until their imports from Ireland were insufficient to supply their rapidly growing business and Nelson decided to investigate the possibility of importing meat from Argentina. The first refrigerated ship they bought was Spindrift which they renamed in 1890 SS Highland Scot. A vessel of 3,060 gross tons bought by James Nelson and Sons in 1889 and fitted with a somewhat primitive refrigerating plant operating on the cold air system became one of the pioneer vessels in the trade of refrigerated meat and other perishable commodities. They hauled beef carcasses from Argentina to Britain. Their regularly scheduled shipments and ships developed into the Nelson Line that was formed in 1880 for the meat trade from Argentina to UK. Refrigeration made it possible to import meat from the United States, New Zealand, Argentina and Australia.

=== Timeline ===
- In 1876, French engineer Charles Tellier bought the ex-Elder-Dempster 690 tons cargo ship Eboe and fitted a Methyl-ether refrigerating plant of his design. The ship was renamed Le Frigorifique and successfully imported a cargo of refrigerated meat from Argentina. However the machinery could be improved and in 1877 another refrigerated ship called Paraguay with a refrigerating plant improved by Ferdinand Carré was put into service on the South American run.
- In 1879, Henry Bell (1848–1931) and John Bell (1850–1929) of Scotland and Joseph James Coleman FRSE (1838–1888) of Scotland completed the Bell–Coleman dense-air machine on the Anchor liner Circassia, which successfully brought a cargo of chilled beef from the US to London.
- In 1880, Strathleven, equipped with a Bell–Coleman air machine and loaded with successfully shipped beef, mutton, butter and kegs, sailed from Melbourne, Australia, to London—a nine-week voyage of about 15,000 miles (24,000 km).
- In 1881, Alfred Seale Haslam (1844–1927) of England equipped the liner Orient with Haslam refrigeration compressors. He bought the Bell–Coleman dense-air patents in 1878 and eventually equipped four hundred plants and ships with Bell-Coleman machines.
- By 1899, refrigerated fruit ship traffic to the US reached 90,000 tons per year.
- By 1890, after acquiring the patent rights of Franz Windhausen's CO_{2}-compression refrigeration system, the J & E Hall company installed the first marine CO_{2} refrigerator system on the Nelson Line ship Highland Chief.
- In 1900, a worldwide survey found 356 refrigerated ships, 37% of which had air machines, 37% ammonia compressors and 25% CO_{2} compressors.
- In 1900, Great Britain imported over 360,000 metric tons of refrigerated meat: 220,000 tons from Argentina, 95,000 tons from New Zealand and 45,000 tons from Australia. There were weekly sailings on refrigerated "banana boats" from the UK to Central America by Elders and Fyffes Ltd, which had been importing bananas since 1888 to the UK in their own ships. Round trips took 28 days.
- In 1901, the first refrigerated banana ship, Port Morant, was equipped with a CO_{2} machine and carried 23,000 stems of bananas at a controlled temperature from Jamaica to the UK.
- In 1902, Lloyd's Register recorded 460 ships with refrigerating plants.
- By 1902, the United Fruit Company started having refrigerated banana boats built in the UK to add to their fleet which hauled passengers and bananas between ports in the United States and Central America.
- By 1910, UK refrigerated meat imports rose to 760,000 tons per year.
- By 1910, the British company J & E Hall had installed 1800 CO_{2} refrigeration machines in ships.
- By 1913, the UK fleet included 230 refrigerated ships with a total cargo capacity of 440,000 tons.
- By 1935, refrigerated imports into Britain totaled 1,000,000 metric tons (980,000 long tons; 1,100,000 short tons) of meat, 500,000 tons of butter, 130,000 tons of cheese, 430,000 tons of apples and pears, and 20 million stems of bananas.

== United Fruit Company reefer ships ==
The United Fruit Company has used some type of reefers, often combined with cruise ship passenger accommodations, since about 1889. Because of their cargo was mostly bananas, they were nicknamed the "Banana Fleet". Since bananas are relatively light and the normal shipping route was to Central America and then back to various US ports, these ships were often built as combination cargo ships and what are now called cruise ships to pay for more of their operating expenses. After about 1910, they called these combination cruise and cargo ships the "Great White Fleet" based on their heat-reducing white paint. To avoid US shipping regulations and taxes they are registered in about six other countries, with very few now maintaining US registry. European associates with their own ships were often employed to ship fruit to Europe. United Brands was taken over by Chiquita Brands International in the 1980s and owns the largest fleet of banana boats in the world, but none of them now sails under the US flag. SS Pastores and SS Calamares were built in Ireland in 1912 and 1913 for the United Fruit Company as a combination cruise ship and refrigerated cargo ship. The United Fruit Company's fleet of about 85 ships was one of the largest civilian fleets in the world. These ships normally carried up to 95 cruise ship passengers and a crew to ports in Central America and then would return to the United States with passengers and a cargo of refrigerated bananas and miscellaneous cargo.

The renamed USS Pastores and USS Calamares were taken over by the United States Navy in World War I and used to take troops and refrigerated supplies to and from Europe. After hostilities ceased they were returned to United Fruit Company in 1919. They were requisitioned again on 2 June 1941 from United Fruit for use in World War II. After hostilities ceased they were then returned again to United Fruit Company in 1946.

== Reefers in US Navy service ==
=== World War I ===
In World War I, the US Navy contracted for 18 refrigerated ships for hauling provisions to the troops in Europe. They were launched 1918 and 1919 as the war was ending and were nearly all scrapped by 1933 in the Great Depression as an economy move. Most were built in Baltimore Dry Dock in Baltimore, Maryland, Moore Dry Dock Company in Oakland, California, and Standard SB Co. in Shooters Island, New York.

=== World War II ===
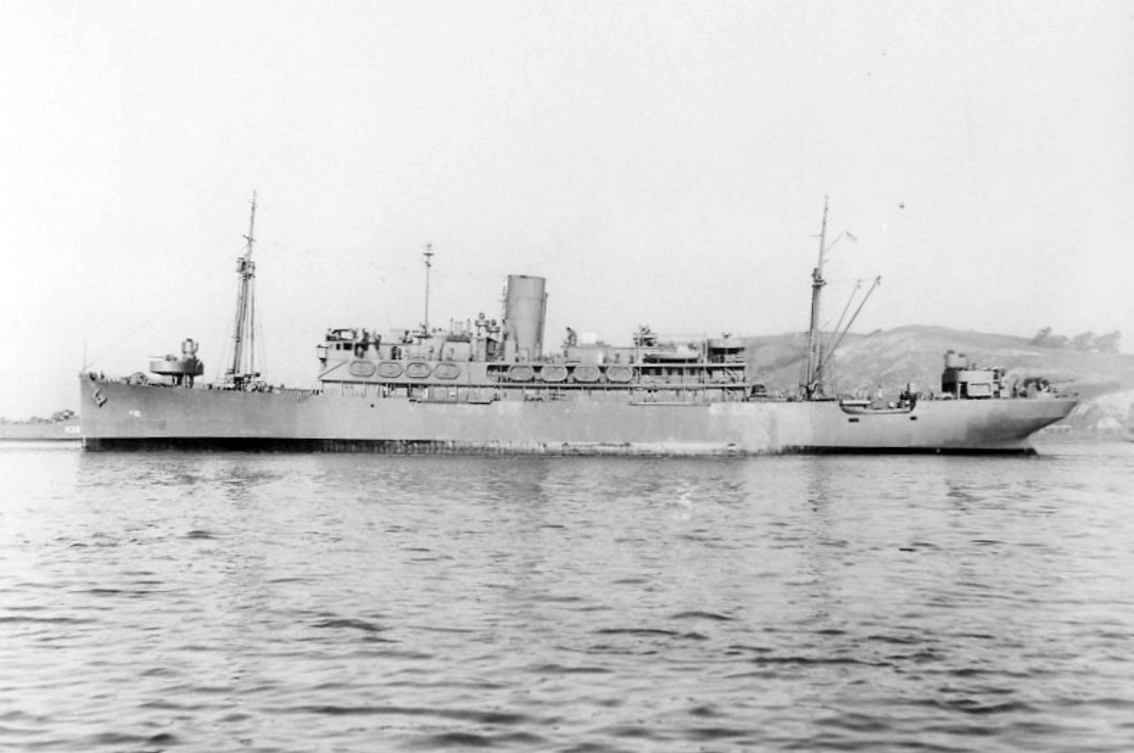
USS Mizar, formerly the United Fruit Co's SS Quirigua

The Mizar-class stores ships were six United Fruit passenger and refrigerated cargo liners built in 1931–1933 that the United States Maritime Commission requisitioned in 1941–1942. They were USS Antigua, USS Ariel, USS Merak, USS Mizar, USS Talamanca and USS Tarazed. Antigua, although requisitioned, was never commissioned into the Navy. United States Maritime Commission Type R ship were Reefer ships.

In April 1943, the Navy also requisitioned SS Ulua from the United Fruit Co. After US navy officers boarded the ship and took possession as it approached the Golden Gate Bridge, the ship became the USS Octans. It was the last of the UFC 'reefer' ships to be taken over.

Other reefers converted for US Navy use were the Danish ships USS Pontiac, USS Roamer and USS Uranus.

In addition, the US Maritime Commission ordered 41 new refrigerated ships for the Navy. Because of the difficulty of building refrigerated ships only two were delivered in 1944. 26 were delivered in 1945 and the remainder in 1946–1948.

== Worldwide service ==
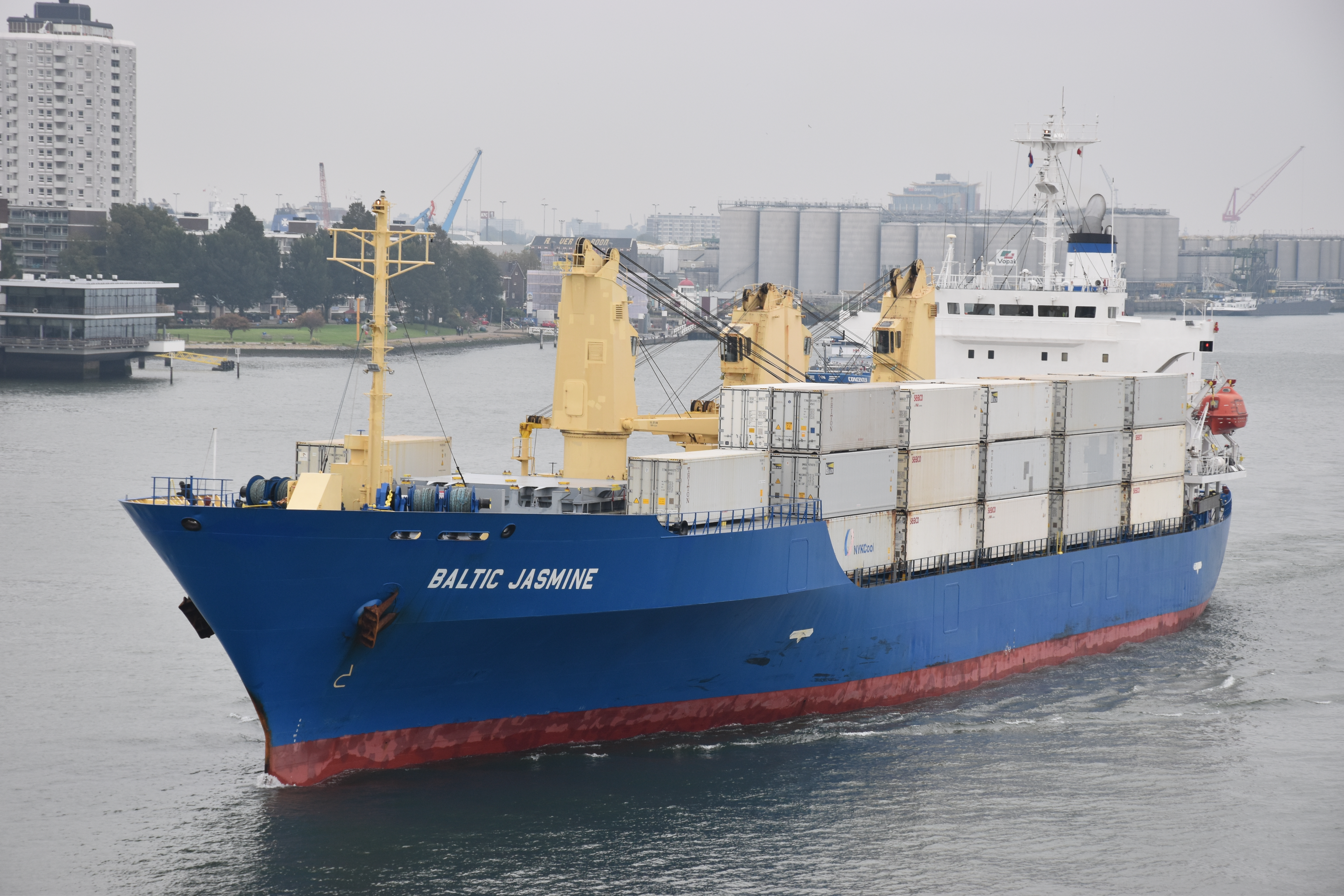
Reefer Baltic Jasmine at Rotterdam

According to the CIA's The World Factbook, there were about 38,000 registered merchant ships in the world in 2010, of which about 920 were designed as refrigerated cargo ships. Because of the proliferation of self-contained refrigerated container systems on container ships, there are many more ships than those designed for only refrigerated cargo that are also carrying some refrigerated cargo. As of 2010, the countries with the largest numbers of reefer ships in their registries are the world's two most prominent flags of convenience: Panama with 212 and Liberia with 109.

== See also ==
- Cold chain
- Refrigeration
- Refrigerator car
- Refrigerator truck
- List of auxiliaries of the United States Navy § Provisions Store Ships (AF, T-AF)
