= USS Mizar (AF-12) =

Cargo ship of the United States Navy

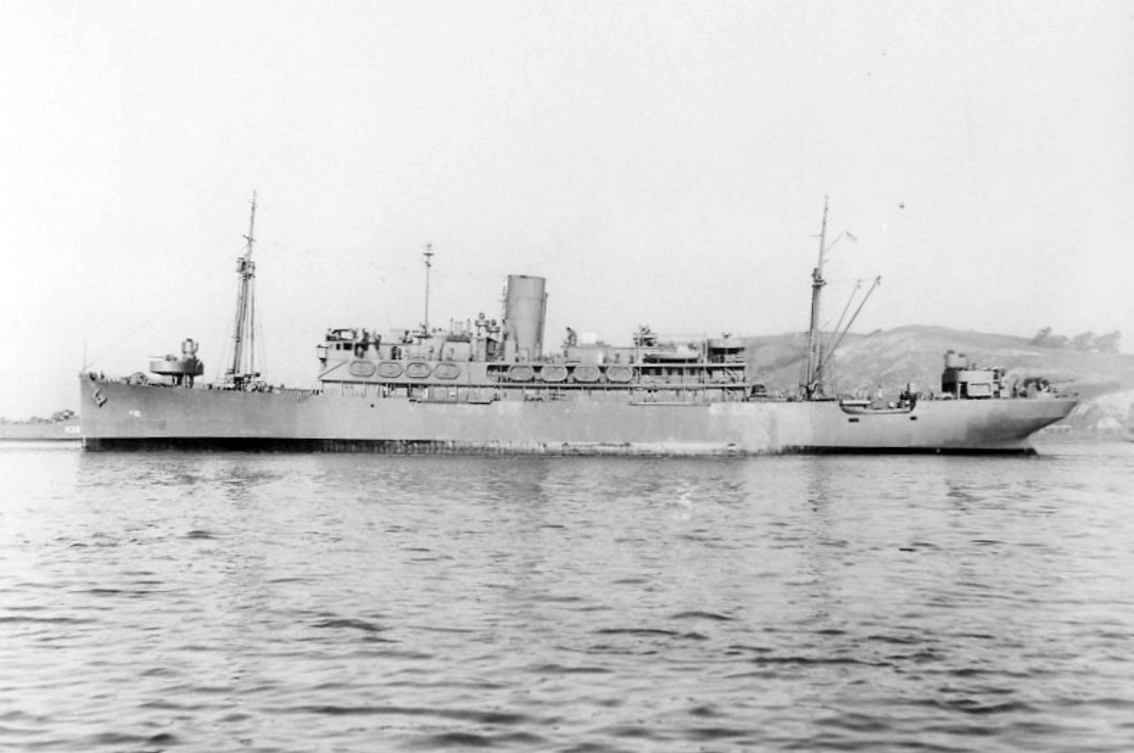

History
- Name: Quirigua (1932–41, 1946–58); Mizar (1941–46); Samala (1958–64)
- Owner: United Fruit Company
- Operator: United Mail Steamship Company (1932–41, 1946–58); US Navy (1941–46); Elders and Fyffes (1958–64)
- Port of registry: New York US and UK
- Route: New York to Caribbean and Central America
- Ordered: August 1930
- Builder: Bethlehem Shipbuilding Corporation
- Laid down: 1931
- Launched: 6 February 1932
- Completed: Delivered 4 June 1932
- Maiden voyage: 8 June 1932
- Identification: U.S. Official Number: 231645; Signal: KDCR
- Fate: Scrapped 1964
- Notes: Ship acquired by WSA for U.S. Navy by bareboat charter, 2 June 1941, commissioned USS Mizar 14 June 1941. Decommissioned and returned to WSA 1 April 1946, restored for former use, returned to owners 15 February 1947.

General characteristics
- Class & type: "Mail class" (United Fruit); Navy: Mizar-class stores ship
- Type: Civilian: passenger, fruit and mail liner
- Tonnage: 6,982 GRT, 3,178 NRT, 2,615 long tons deadweight (DWT)
- Displacement: 10,940
- Length: 447 ft 10 in (136.50 m) (overall); 415.7 ft (126.7 m) (registry)
- Beam: 60.3 ft (18.4 m)
- Draft: 24 ft 9 in (7.5 m) (molded) (Note: Design max draft, commercial.); 25 ft 2 in (7.67 m) (Navy)
- Depth of hold: 24.1 ft (7.3 m)
- Installed power: 4 oil fired Babcock & Wilcox header-type boilers, 350 psi 230° superheat driving GE generator sets for main propulsion and auxiliary power
- Propulsion: 2 GE 4,200 kw, 5,500 hp at 125 rpm, twin 15 ft 6 in (4.7 m), 3 blade screws
- Speed: 17.5 kn (20.1 mph; 32.4 km/h) (Contract service speed)
- Capacity: Commercial: Passengers: design 113, postwar 95; Cargo: 240,070 cu ft (6,798.0 m^{3}) refrigerated; 5,370 cu ft (152.1 m^{3}) baggage, mail & other
- Troops: more than 100
- Complement: Navy: 238
- Crew: Commercial: 112
- Armament: one single 5"/38 caliber gun, four 3"/50 caliber guns AA and anti submarine and up to eight Oerlikon 20 mm cannon anti-aircraft guns

USS Mizar (AF-12) was the United Fruit Company fruit, mail and passenger liner Quirigua that served as a United States Navy Mizar-class stores ship in World War II.

Quirigua was one of six fast turbo-electric transmission driven ships built for United Fruit's subsidiary United Mail Steamship Company, the first of its ships built in the U.S., to take advantage of subsidies and mail contracts. The ships were refrigerated fruit carriers with substantial passenger capacity and, as a result of the mail contract connection, termed "Mail class" by the line. Three were built by Newport News Shipbuilding and three by Bethlehem Shipbuilding Corporation of Quincy, Massachusetts. Quirigua was the second of the group built by Bethlehem Shipbuilding. Three ships served the Pacific routes and three the Atlantic routes with Quirigua operating out of New York.

During the buildup of United States defenses in preparation for war, the ship was acquired for use by the Navy under a bareboat charter as refrigerated stores ships on 2 June 1941 that was administered by the War Shipping Administration (WSA) on creation of that organization in early 1942. The ship was commissioned USS Mizar and served in the Atlantic and Pacific. Mizar decommissioned and returned to WSA at Baltimore 1 April 1946 then, with United Fruit operating the vessel under a General Agency Agreement with WSA, the ship arrived in August 1946 at Bethlehem Steel's Staten Island Shipyard for re-conversion to former use. The conversion complete, the ship was returned to its owner 15 February 1947 as Quirigua.

United Fruit transferred the ship to its British subsidiary Elders and Fyffes where it served as Samala, after an earlier Fyffes ship, until scrapping 1964.

== Construction ==
Quirigua was one of six ships ordered in August 1930 and built under the Merchant Marine Act of 1928 (Jones-White Act) for the United Mail Steamship Company, a subsidiary of the United Fruit Company, designed with specialized cooling and handling arrangements for transporting bananas. Three of the ships were built by Bethlehem Shipbuilding Corporation, Quincy, Massachusetts with Quirigua being the second, preceded by Antigua and followed by Veragua. The other three, built by Newport News Shipbuilding, were Chiriqui, Peten (originally Segovia, later Jamaica) and, the first of the six to be launched, Talamanca. The six ships were of the same basic design with specific developments of that design left to the two builders. The six ships were the first for the line not built in Europe. Construction in U.S. yards was a result of the Merchant Marine Act and more liberal government support in the form of mail contracts.

The carriage of fruit was the primary purpose of the ships, though passengers, mail and general cargo were important components. The design was driven by the special requirements of a refrigerated fruit carrier, in effect an enhanced "banana boat", in which refrigeration and banana handling capability was incorporated in the basic design. An expensive feature, required by the government for loans, was the "two compartment" rule requiring the ship to stay afloat with any two compartments flooded. The ships were subdivided into nine compartments by eight watertight bulkheads. As a result of shorter compartments more refrigeration equipment was required driving costs and requiring larger ships than the former "banana boats" for the same amount of fruit cargo. Sixteen refrigerated cargo compartments were located in two cork insulated holds forward and two aft of the central superstructure with York Ice Machinery Corporation refrigeration units located below the orlop deck aft.

The contract required minimum speed of 17.5 kn (20.1 mph; 32.4 km/h), though in trials some of the ships made over 19 kn (22 mph; 35 km/h), and guaranteed 10,500 horsepower. That was met with a turbo-electric transmission system with four Babcock & Wilcox oil fired boilers providing steam for two turbine driven General Electric (GE) generators and auxiliary generator sets for ship's power. Propulsion was by two 3,150 volt, 4,200 kilowatt, 5,500 horsepower at 125 revolutions GE electric motors driving twin 15 ft 6 in (4.7 m), 3 blade screws. Ship's service electricity was provided by three GE turbine generator sets, 500 kilowatts each with 120 and 240 volt service, driven by steam from the boilers to power electric motors on auxiliaries and deck machinery as well as the electrical systems for quarters and navigation. All auxiliaries normally required at sea were electric motor driven.

The two yards were allowed to develop specific designs from the design characteristics established for the six ships. As a result, there are slight differences in principal characteristics between the Newport News and Bethlehem built ships beyond the normal small differences in measurement type, agency and time. (Note: For comparison the principle characteristics given for the lead ship of both yards, Newport News' Talamanca, published in Pacific Marine Review, "Important Addition to Pacific Shipping" of January 1932 as being 446 ft 9 in (136.2 m) overall length, 430 ft (131.1 m) length on 24 ft (7.3 m) waterline, 415 ft (126.5 m) length between perpendiculars, 60 ft (18.3 m) molded beam, 36 ft 9 in (11.2 m) depth molded to upper deck, 24 ft 9 in (7.5 m) molded maximum draft, 11,345 tons displacement at maximum draft, 6,963 GRT, 3,183 NRT, 196,000 cu ft (5,550.1 m^{3}) cargo capacity, 1,450 tons of fuel oil and 626 tons fresh water capacity.) Comparable figures for Bethlehem's lead ship, Quirigua's yard predecessor Antigua, are given as being 447 ft 10 in (136.5 m) overall length, 428 ft 9 in (130.7 m) length on 24 ft (7.3 m) waterline, 415 ft (126.5 m) length between perpendiculars, 60 ft (18.3 m) molded beam, 34 ft 9 in (10.6 m) depth molded to upper deck, 24 ft (7.3 m) molded, 10,928 tons displacement at the design waterline, 7,035 GRT, 3,523 NRT, 240,070 cu ft (6,798.0 m^{3}) refrigerated cargo capacity, 5,370 cu ft (152.1 m^{3}) for baggage and mail, 1,405 tons of fuel oil and 730 tons fresh water capacity. Accommodations were designed for 113 persons. Bethlehem Shipbuilding designed the passenger spaces, using a modern design for both stateroom and public spaces with the exception of two "period" style rooms, the dining room and library. Both passenger and crew spaces were steam heated and provided with mechanical ventilation.

== Commercial service ==
The company named its ships for Central and South American cities, mountain ranges or provinces. Quiriguá was a Mayan city in south-eastern Guatemala. Quirigua, yard hull number 1445, was launched 6 February 1932 and completed 4 June. The ship was registered at New York, New York with U.S. Official Number 231645 (Note: MARAD status card has the 6 and 4 transposed, as 231465. Registers are clear it was 231645.) signal KDCR at 6,982 GRT, 3,178 NRT, 415.7 ft (126.7 m) registry length, 60.3 ft (18.4 m) beam and depth of 24.1 ft (7.3 m) with 11,000 horsepower engines and a registered crew of 112. The planned crew breakdown by department was deck 24, engineering 34, stewards (passenger services) 48, and doctors, pursers and radio operators 6. The company designated Quirigua and the other five ships as "mail class" ships.

On 8 June 1932 Quirigua sailed from New York for Port Everglades, Havana, Kingston, Cristobal and Limón to begin express liner services between Central America and New York. Scheduled sailings for January through March 1933 show Quirigua, Veragua and Peten operating on a New York, Havana, Kingston, Cristobal, Limón and return to New York omitting Kingston as a port of call. The other three, Antigua, Talamanca and Chiriqui meanwhile operated on a San Francisco to Balboa route with return to San Francisco via Puerto Armuelles and Los Angeles. An intercoastal service for passengers and cargo was formed by the ships connecting in Panama. That schedule remained through 1936. In January 1939 all the ships operated on the New York to Panama route.

== US Navy service ==
Quirigua was delivered to the War Shipping Administration (WSA) for potential wartime service at New York on 2 June 1941 under bareboat charter and simultaneously delivered by WSA to the Navy Department under the same terms. (Note: The on-line DANFS title has AP vice correct AF classification. It is a transcription to digital error as the print DANFS has AF-12.) The original charter to WSA expired on 30 June 1943 but was renewed at Sydney, Australia, on 22 November 1943 retroactive to the expiration.

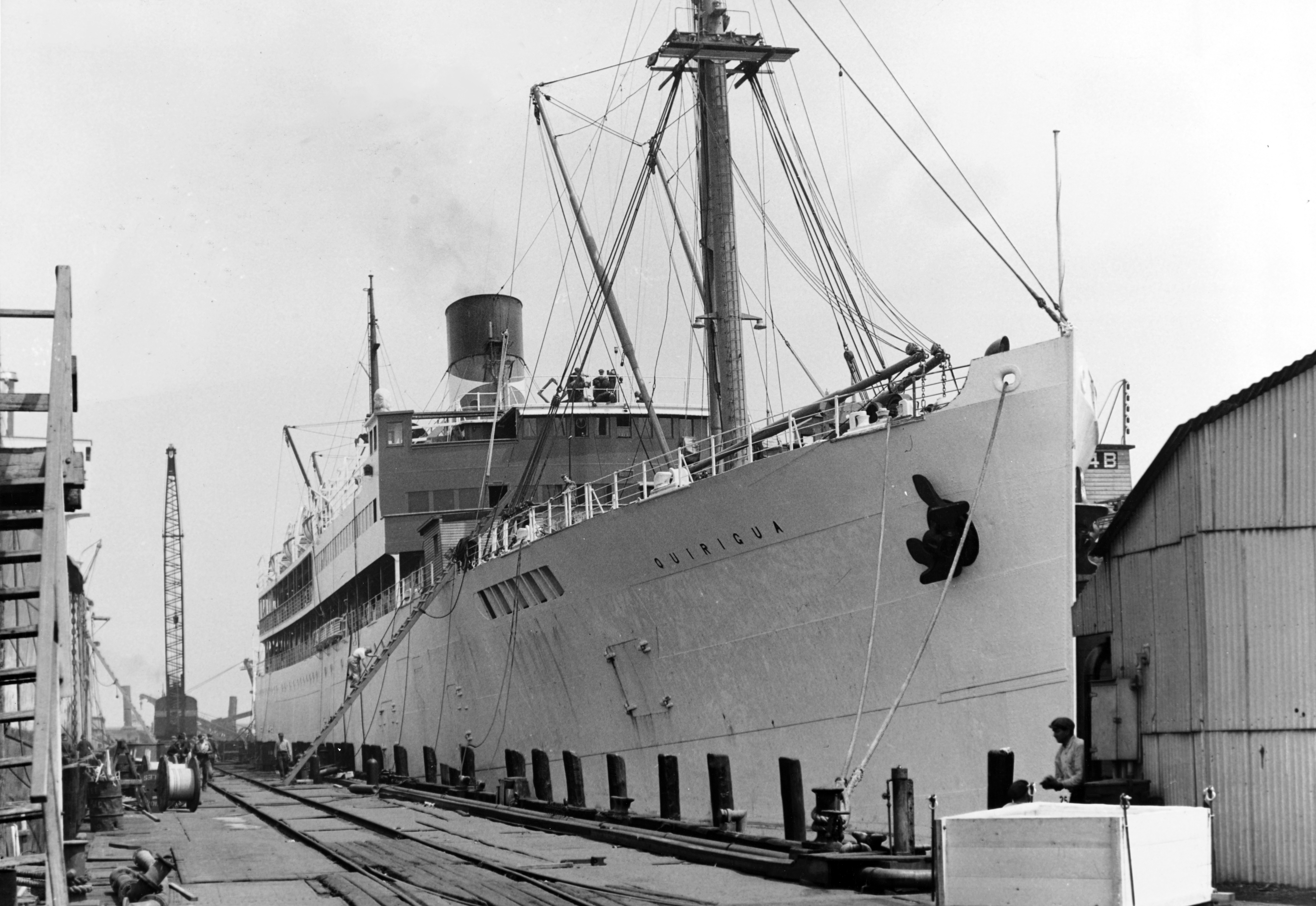
Quirigua at Brewer Ship Yard, Staten Island, N.Y. to be converted, 6 June 1941.

Brewer's Drydock Co. of Staten Island, New York converted the ship for Navy service. The library was converted to office space, the main dining room was converted to a mess hall, the luxury lounge became the officer's wardroom. Staterooms, the verandah cafe and ever other available space was packed with standee berths. Some hold space became ammunition storage and naval alarm and electrical systems, including degaussing, were added. Some 800 tons of concrete ballast was also poured into the ship. Armament was added with a single 5"/38 caliber gun, four 3"/50 caliber guns on raised platforms fore and aft for anti-aircraft (AA) and anti-submarine use and up to eight Oerlikon 20 mm cannon AA guns.

On 14 June 1941 the ship was commissioned as Mizar into the US Navy under the command of Cmdr E.D. Walbridge. Mizar was with Task Force 16 in August 1941 composed of the battleship Mississippi, heavy cruisers Quincy and Wichita, five destroyers, transports when joined by the carrier Wasp, the heavy cruiser Vincennes and escorts all bound for Iceland with the first occupation troops. The ship left Reykjavik on 12 August 1941 in convoy with the other transports and escorts. Mizar was back in Iceland at Hvalfjordur in May 1942 where she supplied the battleship Washington and other ships of Task Force 99. For the next year Mizar operated in the western Atlantic from a number of US East Coast ports supplying bases and ships from Iceland to the Virgin Islands.

Mizar was then modified with more berthing before departing from Norfolk, Virginia, 10 June 1942 with task force TF 39, carrying the 1st Parachute Battalion attached to the 1st US Marine Division who were to take part in the invasion of the Solomon Islands. The force transited the Panama Canal on its month-long voyage to Wellington, New Zealand arriving on 11 July 1942.

Continuing in the southwest Pacific as part of Service Force, US 7th Fleet, she operated initially from Australian ports supporting the successful Australian and American campaign to stop the Japanese on New Guinea. The Army forces engaged in the New Guinea campaign were suffering a critical shortage of fresh food requiring refrigerated transport. In August 1943 the Navy made unused refrigerated space in Mizar available on trips into Milne Bay, New Guinea to help meet Army requirements giving some relief as the Army sought more refrigerated space in its own vessels assigned to the South West Pacific Area. Mizar made seven unescorted voyages to San Francisco, California, between 12 October 1942 and 9 February 1945 to get fresh meat, fruit, vegetables, dairy products and eggs to supply advanced bases and combatant ships. When not making these crossings of the Pacific Ocean she normally worked between Brisbane and Milne Bay.

After the advance of US and Allied Forces in the Pacific she extended her Australian-based service to the Admiralty Islands in May 1944 and anchored in Leyte Gulf in the Philippines on 18 February 1945. She continued carrying men and supplies throughout these areas until 4 January 1946.

Mizar reached San Francisco 25 January 1946 making her last Pacific crossing but soon received orders to go to the US East Coast. Previewing a return to civilian status, en route she took bananas for the United Fruit Company from Quepos, Costa Rica to Charleston, South Carolina.

Mizar averaged over 5,000 miles a month in World War II and received four battle stars for her service. She was decommissioned as a naval vessel at Baltimore, Maryland on 1 April 1946, and struck from the Navy list of active ships on 17 April. The War Shipping Administration took possession of the ship on 1 April at Baltimore placing it under General Agency Agreement for operation by United Fruit in preparation for its return to commercial service.

== Post-war commercial service ==
In August 1946, still in its wartime configuration, paint and with the F-12 on its bow, the ship entered Bethlehem Steel's Staten Island Shipyard at Mariners Harbor for conversion to its former role and name. Some forty cork insulated, waterline, hull plates damaged in alongside replenishment of ships were replaced and fiberglass insulation was installed in place of the old cork. The 800 tons of concrete ballast had to be broken up in place and removed. The naval electrical and degaussing system were removed. The Navy had sealed the 22 cargo doors and those had to be replaced. Engines, refrigeration, fire and cargo handling machinery was all reconditioned. Passenger accommodations for 105, though the company announced the "mail class" ships would only carry 96 passengers, were refurbished and brought up to current safety standards with public areas were rebuilt to a similar luxury of the original 1932 condition. A 1950 brochure shows cabin layouts and public rooms for up to 95 passengers. Quirigua's conversion back to civilian use was complete in February 1947 with delivery to United Fruit at Pier 9, North River, New York on 15 February 1947. The April to December 1950 schedule shows the ship on a New Orleans, Havana, Puerto Barrios and direct return to New Orleans with 1952 showing New Orleans, Cristobal, Tela and direct return to New Orleans.

In 1958 United Fruit transferred Quirigua and her sisters Talamanca and Veragua to its British subsidiary Elders and Fyffes. Quirigua was renamed SS Samala after an earlier Fyffes ship of the same name. She was scrapped in 1964.

== Other Ships in the Mizar class ==
Strictly these ships were not a Navy "class" in the formal sense of ships built or completed to a common design for the Navy. They were all ships built to a basic design for United Fruit Company's subsidiary the United Mail Steamship Company by two builders that were allowed to apply the design with minor variations to the three ships each were contracted to build. The design was for a refrigerated fruit cargo ship with significant passenger capacity and to meet requirements for mail contracts, the last resulting in the company designating the ships the company's "Mail class" ships. The five that the Navy obtained under bareboat charter through the War Shipping Administration and commissioned in effect formed a class.

Ownership of all the ships remained with the United Fruit Company with WSA acquisition under bareboat charters and those transferred to Navy operating under a sub bareboat charter from WSA.

- USS Ariel (AF-22) was the United Fruit Company ship Jamaica (ex Peten, ex Segovia) (Note: Segovia burned at the outfitting pier just before completion. The ship was rebuilt under a different yard hull number as Peten.) (Note: There is no record of the ship being named Dione in 1942. It was a prospective name for the Navy but conflicted with another vessel and never used.) launched 15 August 1931 by Newport News Shipbuilding. The ship was delivered to WSA 24 March 1942 at New Orleans and simultaneously delivered to the Navy. The Navy commissioned the ship as Ariel designated AF-22 on 14 May 1942 after conversion for naval use by Todd Galveston Dry Dock, Galveston, Texas. Ariel was decommissioned and delivered to WSA on 21 June 1946 at New York. Jamaica was operated by United Fruit as WSA's agent under a General Agency Agreement until returned to the company for commercial operation on 9 December 1947. The ship was sold to German owners in December 1957 and broken up in 1969 as Blumenthal.
- USS Merak (AF-21) was the United Fruit Company ship Veragua launched 23 April 1932 by Bethlehem Shipbuilding. Veragua was delivered to WSA on 20 March 1942 at New Orleans and simultaneously delivered to the Navy. The ship was converted for naval use by Todd Galveston Dry Dock, Galveston, and commissioned 8 May 1942 as Merak designated AF-21. The ship decommissioned on 21 June 1946 at New York and was returned to WSA. Veragua was placed with United Fruit Company as agents under a General Agency Agreement for repairs at Bethlehem Shipbuilding. The ship was returned to the company on 9 January 1948. In December 1958 Veragua was sold to owners in the United Kingdom and renamed Sinaloa. The ship was scrapped 2 October 1964.
- USS Talamanca (AF-15) was the United Fruit Company ship Talamanca, launched 15 August 1931 by Newport News Shipbuilding & Drydock Company, as the lead ship of the six United Fruit "Mail class" cargo liners. The ship was delivered to WSA at New York on 16 December 1941 under bareboat charter and delivered to the Navy the same day under sub bareboat charter. After conversion at Maryland Drydock Company, Baltimore, the ship was commissioned as USS Talamanca designated AF-15 on 28 January 1942. The ship was returned to WSA at New Orleans to be operated by United Fruit as the WSA agent under a General Agency Agreement until returned to the company on 8 July 1947 at Mobile, Alabama. The ship was sold to a United Kingdom company in November 1958, renamed Sulaco to be scrapped in 1964.
- USS Tarazed (AF-13) was the United Fruit Company ship Chiriqui launched 14 November 1931 by Newport News Shipbuilding & Drydock Company. On 4 June 1941 Chiriqui was delivered to WSA at New York under bareboat charter and delivered to the Navy the same day under sub bareboat charter. After conversion at Brewer's Drydock Company, Staten Island, New York, the Navy commissioned the ship as USS Tarazed designated AF-13 on 14 June 1941. On 4 January 1946 Tarazed decommissioned at New Orleans and was delivered to WSA. Chiriqui operated for WSA with United Fruit as agent under General Agency Agreement until 15 June 1947 when it was returned to the company at New Orleans. The ship was sold to Union-Partenreederei T/S, a German company, in September 1957 to be renamed Blexen and eventually scrapped in 1969.

One of the six ships was considered for Navy use but was WSA operated throughout the war by United Fruit as agent:

- Antigua was a United Fruit passenger and refrigerated cargo liner launched 12 December 1931 by Bethlehem Shipbuilding. Delivered to the War Shipping Administration (WSA) on 26 December 1941 at New York and assigned to United Fruit for operation under WSA agreement as agent. Antigua was considered for Navy use, assigned the designation AF-17, and got more elaborate gun installations at Maryland Drydock Co., Baltimore in prospect of that use but was never acquired or commissioned. The ship was WSA operated but allocated to Navy requirements. Antigua was returned to United Fruit 17 March 1947 and scrapped in 1964 as Tortuga.

Older United Fruit Company passenger and refrigerated ships were also acquired by the Navy in 1942. USS Pastores (AF-16) and USS Calamares (AF-18) were built in 1912 and 1913 and had been requisitioned in World War I then returned to United Fruit. The converted "reefers" USS Uranus (AF-14), USS Roamer (AF-19) and USS Pontiac (AF-20) were former Danish refrigerated ships requisitioned by the US Maritime Commission in 1942.

== Bibliography ==
- Beyer, Edward F. (1986). "Question 11/85". Warship International. XXIII (3): 312. ISSN 0043-0374.
