= SS Antigua =

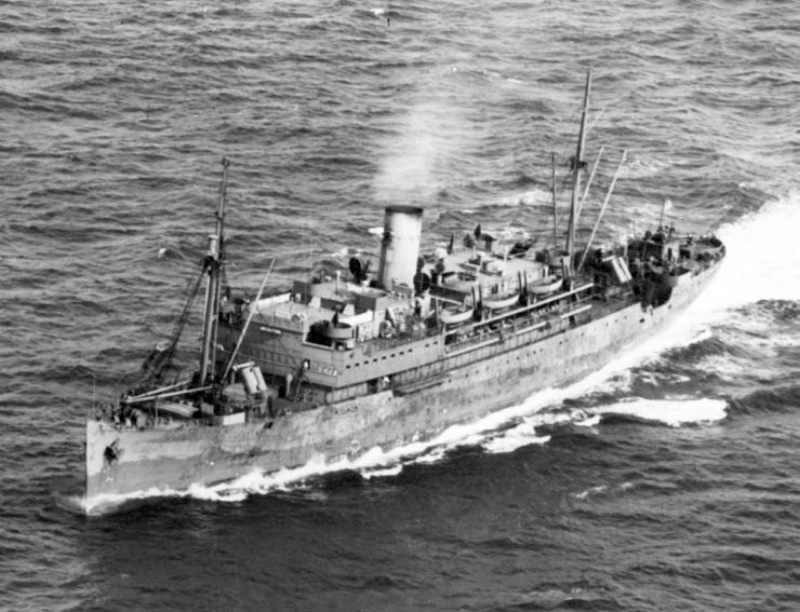
- SS Antigua on 27 November 1942

History

United States
- Name: Antigua (1932–58); Tortuga (1958–64)
- Namesake: Antigua in the Leeward Islands; (1932–58)
- Owner: United Fruit Company/United Mail Steamship Company (1932–57) (Note: United Mail was an operating subsidiary of United Fruit. In about 1935—1936 the ships came under direct ownership and operation of the parent company.); Swedish company (1957—1964)
- Operator: United Mail Steamship Company (1932 about 1936); United Fruit Company (1936—1941); War Shipping Administration (1941—1947); United Fruit Company (1947—1957); Swedish company (1957—1964)
- Port of registry: (United States) New York (1932–58)
- Ordered: August 1930
- Builder: Bethlehem Shipbuilding, Quincy, MA
- Yard number: 1444
- Laid down: 30 April 1931
- Launched: 12 December 1931
- Completed: delivered 1 April 1932
- Acquired: War Shipping Administration under bareboat charter 26 December 1941
- Identification: signal code MJQR (1932–33); Call sign KDCJ (1934–58)
- Fate: Scrapped 1964
- Notes: Not commissioned into the US Navy. Returned to United Fruit by 17 March 1947.

General characteristics
- Class & type: "Mail class" passenger/cargo (United Fruit)
- Tonnage: 6,982 GRT, 3,178 NRT; tonnage under deck 3,985
- Length: 447 ft 10 in (136.50 m) LOA; 415.7 ft (126.7 m) (Registry); 428 ft 9 in (130.68 m) on designed waterline
- Beam: 60.3 ft (18.4 m)
- Draft: 24 ft 0 in (7.32 m) (molded)
- Depth: 24.1 ft (7.3 m); 34 ft 9 in (10.59 m) moulded to upper deck side
- Installed power: 4 oil fired Babcock & Wilcox header-type boilers, 325 psi 230° superheat driving GE generator sets for main propulsion and auxiliary power
- Propulsion: 2 GE 4,200 kw, 5,500 hp at 125 rpm, twin 15 ft 6 in (4.7 m), 3 blade screws
- Speed: 17.5 knots (32.4 km/h) (contract); 19 knots (35 km/h) (max)
- Capacity: Commercial: Passengers: design 113, postwar 95; Cargo: 240,070 cu ft (6,798.0 m^{3}) refrigerated; 5,370 cu ft (152.1 m^{3}) baggage, mail & other
- Crew: 113

SS Antigua was a United Fruit Company passenger and refrigerated cargo liner completed as one of six nearly identical vessels, three built by Newport News Shipbuilding and three by Bethlehem Shipbuilding Corporation, for operation by the company's subsidiary the United Mail Steamship Company. The ship was the first of the ships built by Bethlehem Shipbuilding Corporation, Quincy, Massachusetts.

The company's primary business was the banana trade, but some passenger service had been a part of its business. Requirements of the United States implemented to obtain subsidies and mail contracts drove a design for a larger ship to transport the same amount of fruit. The resulting design was for a ship with more passenger space and features of ocean liners not before incorporated into the company's ships. The ships were designed to carry up to 113 passengers, all first class, with public spaces including a swimming pool, a ballroom and other features of passenger liners. Special mail transport features were in the design and included special space for valuables. The company designated the six ships as its "Mail class" ships. Three ships were assigned routes from New York to Cristóbal, Colón, Panama and three, including Antigua, to its San Francisco to Balboa, Panama route. An intercoastal connection was thus maintained for the line's passengers and freight.

By 1936 the line transferred its ships to the Atlantic and with U.S. entry into the war the ships were all placed under bareboat charter to the War Shipping Administration (WSA) for the duration. Antigua was the only ship of the six not then placed under sub bareboat charter to the Navy to be commissioned and serving as a Navy ship with naval crew. After the war the ship was returned to the company and served on a similar route as before the war. In December 1957 the ship was sold to Swedish owners and renamed Tortuga operating until scrapping in 1964.

== Construction ==
The ship was one of six built under the Merchant Marine Act of 1928 for the United Mail Steamship Company, a subsidiary of the United Fruit Company, designed with specialized cooling and handling arrangements for transporting bananas with Babcock & Wilcox boilers and General Electric turbo-electric transmission: Chiriqui, Peten (originally Segovia) andTalamanca from Newport News Shipbuilding and Antigua, Quirigua and Veragua from Bethlehem Shipbuilding Corporation's Fore River Shipyard in Quincy, Massachusetts.

The six ships were of the same basic design with specific developments of that design left to the two builders. They were the first for the line not built in Europe. Construction in U.S. yards was a result of the Merchant Marine Act and more liberal government support in the form of mail contracts.

Design of the ships was driven by the fact that bananas, requiring refrigeration, were the primary cargo and the United States government subsidies required compliance with the latest safety measures. The "two compartment" rule requiring the ship to stay afloat with any two compartments flooded was an expensive feature. The ships were subdivided into nine compartments by eight watertight bulkheads. As a result of shorter compartments more refrigeration equipment was required driving costs and requiring larger ships for the same amount of fruit cargo than earlier banana boats. Sixteen refrigerated cargo compartments were located in two cork insulated holds forward and two aft of the central superstructure with York Ice Machinery Corporation refrigeration units located below the orlop deck aft. The holds were used for general cargo on southbound trips with steel being one of the main items. Aft at the main deck level was a special hold for cargo such as meat requiring lower temperatures than the fruit.

The larger hull allowed for more passenger space and features of ocean liners previously not incorporated into the company's ships. The public areas included a swimming pool and deck ballroom. The mail contracts were met with a special bulk mail compartment and strong room for carriage of bullion and other valuables was located starboard at main deck level with direct access through entry ports. The company designated the ships as its "Mail class" due to their design to meet requirements for mail carriage subsidies. Antigua was the first of the ships from Bethlehem Shipbuilding Corporation with keel laying 30 April 1931, launch on 12 December 1931 and delivery on 1 April 1932.

Design specifications were for a ship of 7,035.12 GRT, 3,523 NRT, 447 ft 10 in (136.50 m) length overall,415 ft (126 m) length between perpendiculars and 428 ft 9 in (130.68 m) on designed waterline, with a beam of 60 ft 0 in (18.29 m), a design draft of 24 ft 0 in (7.32 m) (molded), and depth 24 ft 0 in (7.32 m) molded to the upper deck. Displacement to designed waterline was 10,928, with cargo capacities of 240,070 cubic feet refrigerated space in two holds forward, two aft and two special low temperature holds aft with 5,370 cubic feet of mail and baggage storage. Normal service speed of 17.5 knots was driven by engines with of 10,500 normal shaft horsepower and the ship reached 19 knots during trials. Design was for a crew of 112 and up to 113 passengers.

Antigua was registered with U.S. Official Number 231465, signal KDCJ at 6,982 GRT, 3,178 NRT, registry length of 415.7 ft (126.7 m), 60.3 ft (18.4 m) beam, 24.1 ft (7.3 m) depth, 11,000 horsepower, 113 crew with home port of New York and owner as United Mail Steamship Company.

== Commercial service ==
On delivery Antigua was placed in the Pacific coastal passenger and banana trade between San Francisco and Armuelles. Schedules in 1933 show Antigua, Chiriqui and Talamanca operating on a route of San Francisco to Balboa with return via Puerto Armuelles and Los Angeles. Between 1935 and 1936 schedules the ship changed from Pacific service to service from New York to Cuba and Puerto Barrios, Guatemala with that service continuing through 1941.

== War Shipping Administration service ==
Antigua was delivered by United Fruit Company to the War Shipping Administration (WSA) on 26 December 1941 at New York and assigned to United Fruit for operation under WSA agreement as agent. On 27 December 1941 the US Navy designated the ship as the Mizar-class stores ship Antigua (AF-17). Navy records indicate the ship was allocated to the Navy and perhaps considered for acquisition and commissioning; however, Antigua never received a naval crew nor was it formally taken over by the Navy. The Navy cancelled the name "Antigua" on 22 May 1944.

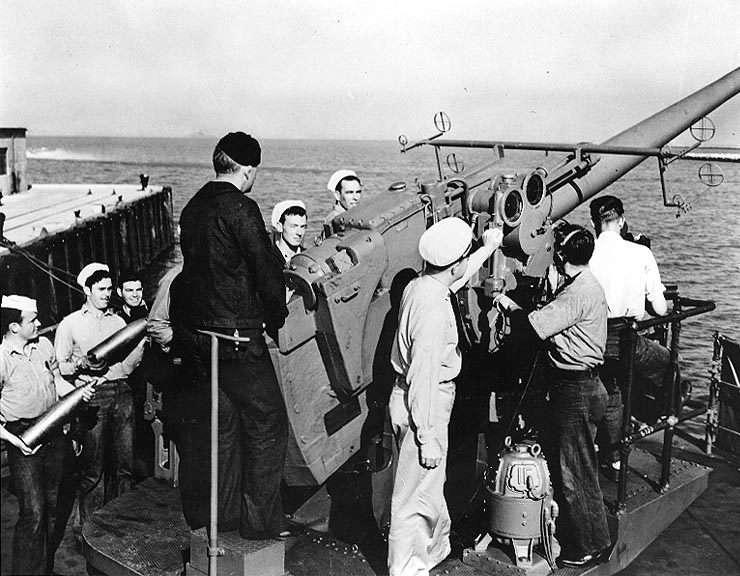
5"/38 caliber gun with crew of 12–20 men

The ship underwent a limited modification at Maryland Drydock Company, of Baltimore, Maryland. Armament included a single 5"/38 caliber gun and four 3"/50 caliber guns for anti-aircraft and anti submarine use and up to eight Oerlikon 20 mm cannon anti-aircraft guns. With some modification Antigua was able to carry a number of troops as well as refrigerated stores.

The ship operated under WSA with United Fruit Company acting as its agent and providing the civilian crew. The ship apparently continued to operate in the Pacific with mentions at Eniwetok late September 1944 and being aground and pulled off a reef in Hawaiian waters during 14–21 October 1944 by USS Jicarilla (ATF-104). Antigua continued to operate under WSA until returned to United Fruit 17 March 1947.

== Later career ==
Postwar Antigua resumed operations departing from New Orleans for destinations in Cuba, Guatemala and Honduras.

In December 1957 Antigua was sold to Swedish owners who renamed her Tortuga. She was scrapped in 1964.
