= USS Merak (AF-21) =

Cargo ship of the United States Navy

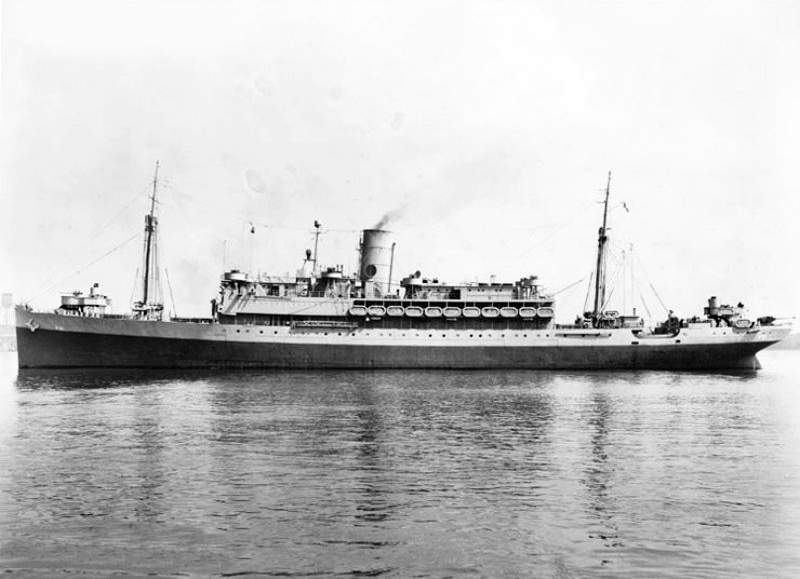

History
- Name: Veragua (1932–42; 1946–58); Merak (1942–46); Sinaloa (1958–64)
- Owner: United Fruit Company; Elders and Fyffes (1958–64)
- Operator: United Fruit Company (1932–42; 1946–58); United States Navy (1942–46); Elders and Fyffes (1958–64)
- Port of registry: New York (1932–1958); United Kingdom (1958–1964)
- Ordered: August 1930
- Builder: Bethlehem Shipbuilding Corporation
- Yard number: 1446
- Launched: 23 April 1932
- Acquired: Delivered: 5 August 1932; Navy: 20 March 1942 (bareboat charter)
- Maiden voyage: 11 August 1932
- In service: 1932
- Out of service: 1965
- Identification: U.S. Official Number: 231755; Signal: KDCT
- Fate: Scrapped 1965
- Notes: Commissioned U.S. Navy: 8 May 1942—21 June 1946

General characteristics
- Class & type: "Mail class" passenger/cargo (United Fruit); Navy: Mizar-class stores ship
- Type: Passenger & cargo liner
- Tonnage: 6,982 GRT, 3,178 NRT, 4,750 DWT
- Displacement: 7,068 t.(lt) 10,928 t.(fl)
- Length: 447 ft 10 in (136.50 m) (LOA); 415.8 ft (126.7 m) (Registry)
- Beam: 60.3 ft (18.4 m)
- Draft: 24 ft 6 in (7.47 m)
- Depth: 24.1 ft (7.3 m)
- Installed power: 4 oil fired Babcock & Wilcox header-type boilers, 350 psi 230° superheat driving GE generator sets for main propulsion and auxiliary power
- Propulsion: 2 GE 4,200 kw, 5,500 hp at 125 rpm, twin 15 ft 6 in (4.7 m), 3 blade screws
- Speed: 19 knots (35 km/h) (max)
- Capacity: Commercial: Passengers: design 113, postwar 95; Cargo: 240,070 cu ft (6,798.0 m^{3}) refrigerated; 5,370 cu ft (152.1 m^{3}) baggage, mail & other
- Troops: 100+
- Complement: Navy: 238
- Crew: 103 registry, 113 design
- Armament: one single 5 in (130 mm) dual purpose gun mount, four single 3 in (76 mm) dual purpose gun mounts, eight 20 mm guns

USS Merak (AF-21), the second Navy ship of the name, was the United Fruit Company cargo and passenger liner Veragua that served as a United States Navy Mizar-class stores ship in World War II.

Veragua was built for United Fruit's subsidiary United Mail Steamship Company by Bethlehem Shipbuilding Corporation, Fore River Plant, Quincy, Massachusetts. The ship was one of six nearly identical ships with three each built by Newport News Shipbuilding and Drydock Company and Bethlehem Shipbuilding.

The ships were designed to take advantage of U.S. subsidies, including mail contracts, and designated by the line as its "Mail class" vessels to meet the company's primary purpose of refrigerated banana transport with passenger and mail being important sources of revenue. Veragua, launched 23 April 1932 and delivered 5 August was one of three ships assigned to the company's Atlantic routes to Panama allowing an intercoastal connection with the three ships assigned to the Pacific.

Veragua was delivered to the War Shipping Administration (WSA) in March 1942 for wartime operation under bareboat charter. The Navy acquired the ship from WSA under sub bareboat charter at the same time, commissioning the ship 8 May 1942 as Merak designated AF-21 after modifications were made for wartime naval service. The ship served in the Atlantic throughout the war. After decommissioning of Merak in June 1946 Veragua was reconverted to commercial operations and then returned to the company for resumption of service on a similar route as before the war. The ship, with two sister ships, was transferred to its British subsidiary Elders and Fyffes to be renamed Sinaloa operating until 1965 when the ship was scrapped.

== Construction ==
Veragua, named for a mountain range in Panama, was the last of six nearly identical ships, the first being Talamanca, launched for the United Mail Steamship Company, a United Fruit Company subsidiary. (Note: The last ship delivered was Peten due to it burning during final fitting out under its original name, Segovia. The ship was rebuilt as a different yard hull number and renamed with delivery on 24 February 1933.) The six ships were built to a common design by two builders, Newport News Shipbuilding and Drydock Company and Bethlehem Shipbuilding. Newport News Shipbuilding built Talamanca, Chiriqui and Peten. The other Bethlehem ships were Antigua and Quirigua.

United Fruit's primary business was transport of bananas from Central and South America with passengers, mail and general cargo as important components. The design was thus driven by the special requirements of a refrigerated fruit carrier, in effect an enhanced "banana boat", in which refrigeration and banana handling capability was incorporated in the basic design. An expensive feature, required by the government for loans, was the "two compartment" rule requiring the ship to stay afloat with any two compartments flooded. The ships were subdivided into nine compartments by eight watertight bulkheads. As a result of shorter compartments more refrigeration equipment was required driving costs and requiring larger ships than the former "banana boats" for the same amount of fruit cargo. Sixteen refrigerated cargo compartments were located in two cork insulated holds forward and two aft of the central superstructure with York Ice Machinery Corporation refrigeration units located below the orlop deck aft. The company designated the ships as its "Mail class" due to their design to meet requirements for mail carriage subsidies.

Bethlehem Shipbuilding Corporation of Quincy, Massachusetts built the ship as yard hull 1446 with launch on 23 April 1932 and delivery in August 1932. Design was based on Antigua, the first of the ships from Bethlehem Shipbuilding Corporation, with slight variance from the Newport News implementation. Specifications were 447 ft 10 in (136.50 m) , length between perpendiculars of 415 ft 0 in (126.49 m) and 428 ft 9 in (130.68 m) on designed waterline. Beam of 60 ft 0 in (18.29 m) with a design draft, molded of 24 ft 0 in (7.32 m) and depth, molded to upper deck of 24 ft 0 in (7.32 m). Displacement tonnage to the designed waterline was 10,928, gross 7,035.12 and net 3,523 with cargo capacities of 240,070 cubic feet refrigerated space in two holds forward, two aft and two special low temperature holds aft with 5,370 cubic feet of mail and baggage storage. Normal service speed of 17.5 knots was achieved by two turbo-electric transmission with of 10,500 normal shaft horsepower and some of the ships reached 19 knots during trials.

Veragua was registered with U.S. Official Number 231755, signal KDCT at 6,982 GRT, 3,178 NRT, registry length of 415.8 ft (126.7 m), 60.3 ft (18.4 m) beam, 24.1 ft (7.3 m) depth, 10,500 horsepower, 103 crew with home port of New York and owner as United Mail Steamship Company.

== Commercial service ==
Veragua was delivered 5 August 1932 and made her maiden voyage on 11 August to Havana, Kingston, Cristobal and Limón. Scheduled sailings for January through March 1933 show Veragua along with Quirigua and Peten operating on a New York, Havana, Kingston, Cristobal, Limón and return to New York omitting Kingston as a port of call. The other three, Antigua, Talamanca and Chiriqui meanwhile operated on a San Francisco to Balboa route with return to San Francisco via Puerto Armuelles and Los Angeles. An intercoastal service for passengers and cargo was formed by the ships connecting in Panama. That schedule remained through 1936. In January 1939 all the ships operated on the New York to Panama route.

On 2 February 1940 naval historian Samuel E. Morison and his Harvard Columbus Expedition returned to New York aboard Veragua after retracing the voyages of Christopher Columbus since the previous August.

== US Navy service ==
On 20 March 1942 United Fruit delivered Veragua to the War Shipping Administration (WSA) at New Orleans under bareboat charter. Simultaneously the Navy acquired the ship under sub bareboat charter. The ship was converted to naval use by Todd Pacific Shipyards of Galveston, Texas and commissioned Merak, designated AF-21, on 8 May 1942, commanded by Cmdr L.E. Divoll.

shakedown training began on her maiden Navy voyage to Charleston, South Carolina. By 20 March 1943 she completed 10 voyages in convoy from east coast ports to Caribbean islands. She then made one supply voyage to Reykjavík, Iceland, arriving on 10 April. She then made two short deliveries to Cuba before making her first transatlantic crossing in July, delivering men, mail, and stores in Algeria, North Africa. Between further Caribbean trips, Merak voyaged to both Sicily and Scotland before the end of 1943.

She continued Caribbean sailings and transatlantic voyages until February 1945, including four crossings from Bayonne, New Jersey, to Italian ports. After a brief drydocking she supplied ships and bases from Iceland to Trinidad. On her last voyage to Reykjavík, on 14 July 1946 a blizzard blew her ashore while anchored at Argentia, Newfoundland. She was freed by tugs and completed her voyage. She then made two more trips to San Juan, Puerto Rico, and Trinidad before being released by the Navy.

Merak’s crew were awarded the following medals: American Campaign Medal, Europe-Africa-Middle East Campaign Medal and World War II Victory Medal.

== Post-war commercial service ==
On 21 June 1946 Merak was decommissioned at New York and returned the ship to WSA. Veragua was then operated by United Fruit as WSA's agent under a General Agency Agreement to be converted back to commercial service and then returned to the company on 8 January 1948. The April to December 1950 schedule shows the ship on a New Orleans, Havana, Puerto Barrios and direct return to New Orleans with 1952 showing New Orleans, Cristobal, Tela and direct return to New Orleans.

== Sale ==
In December 1958 United Fruit transferred Veragua and her sisters Quirigua and Talamanca to its British subsidiary Elders and Fyffes, which changed Veragua's name to SS Sinaloa. She was scrapped in Ghent, Belgium in 1965.
