= USS Ariel (AF-22) =

Cargo ship of the United States Navy

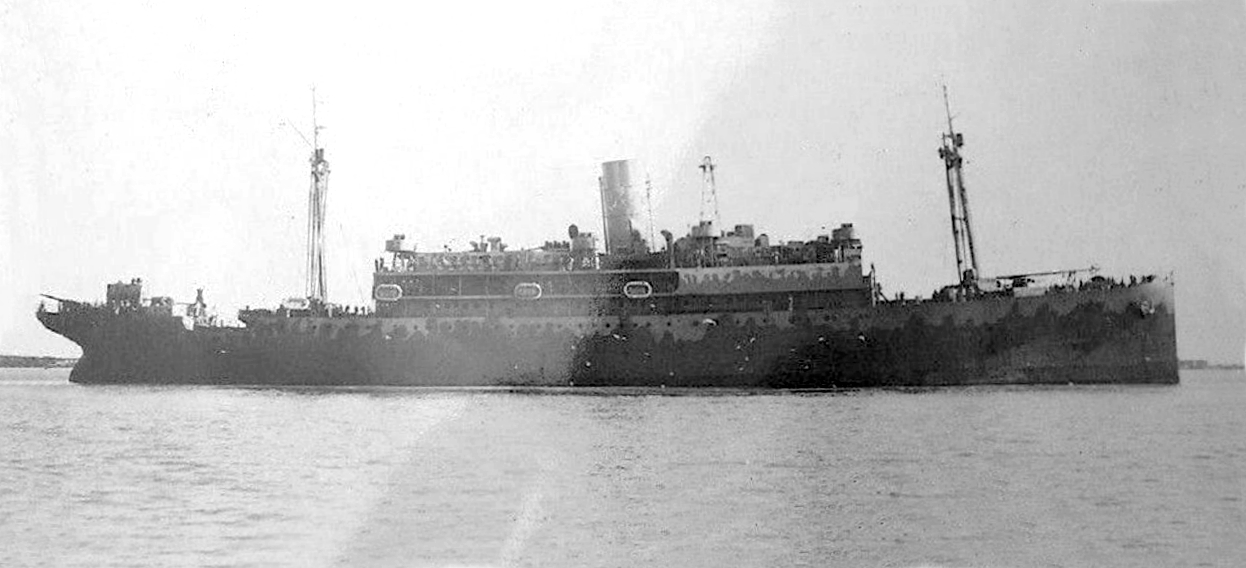

History
- Name: Segovia (1931); Peten (1932–37); Jamaica (1937–42, 1946–1957); Ariel (1942–46); Blumenthal (1957–1969)
- Namesake: Ariel in Shakespeare's The Tempest
- Owner: United Mail Steamship Co (1933–37); United Fruit Company (1937– ); Union-Partenreederei ( –1969)
- Operator: United Fruit Company (1933–42, 1946–1957); United States Navy (1941–46); Union-Partenreederei (1957–1969)
- Port of registry: New York
- Ordered: August 1930
- Builder: Newport News Shipbuilding & Drydock Co
- Yard number: 354
- Laid down: 9 March 1931
- Launched: 15 August 1931; Note: Ship christened Peten 15 August 1932, anniversary of original christening, after fire, rebuilding and renaming.
- Acquired: Delivered: 24 February 1933; Navy: 24 March 1942 ( bareboat charter through WSA)
- Maiden voyage: 2 March 1933
- In service: 1933
- Out of service: 1969
- Identification: U.S. Official Number: 232139; Signal KDCY
- Fate: Scrapped 1969
- Notes: Name Ariel struck from Navy list 3 July 1946

General characteristics
- Class & type: "Mail class" passenger/cargo (United Fruit); Navy: Mizar-class stores ship
- Tonnage: 6,968 GRT, 3,152 NRT
- Displacement: 7,068 long tons (7,181 t) light; 11,875 long tons (12,066 t) full load
- Length: 447 ft 9 in (136.47 m) (LOA); 415.4 ft (126.6 m) (Registry)
- Beam: 60.2 ft (18.3 m)
- Draft: 26 ft (7.9 m)
- Depth: 24 ft (7.3 m)
- Installed power: 4 oil fired Babcock & Wilcox header-type boilers, 350 psi 230° superheat driving GE generator sets for main propulsion and auxiliary power
- Propulsion: 2 GE 4,200 kw, 5,500 hp at 125 rpm, twin 15 ft 6 in (4.7 m), 3 blade screws
- Speed: 17.5 kn (20.1 mph; 32.4 km/h) (Contract service speed); 18.5 knots (34.3 km/h; 21.3 mph)
- Capacity: Commercial: Passengers: design 113, postwar 95; 196,000 cu ft (5,550.1 m^{3})
- Complement: Navy: 238
- Crew: Commercial: 113
- Armament: 1 × 5"/38 caliber guns; 3 × 3"/50 caliber guns; 12 × 20 mm guns

USS Ariel (AF-22) was the United Fruit Company cargo and passenger liner Peten, renamed Jamaica in 1937, that served as a United States Navy Mizar-class stores ship in World War II.

As Segovia it was launched on 15 August 1931 the same day as Talamanca, both ships christened by First Lady Lou Henry Hoover using water gathered from Central American rivers. Segovia burned at the fitting out pier and was almost completely destroyed. It was rebuilt under a different hull number and renamed Peten by Mrs. Hoover on the anniversary of the first, 15 August 1932. Peten was delivered to the company's United Mail Steamship Company subsidiary in February 1933. The ship served on the company's Atlantic routes between New York and Panama. In 1937 the ship was transferred to the direct ownership of the parent company and renamed Jamaica.

In March 1942 Jamaica was delivered to the War Shipping Administration (WSA) under bareboat charter and delivered to the Navy under sub bareboat charter to be commissioned Ariel named after the "airy and playful spirit" Ariel in William Shakespeare's play The Tempest. 21 June 1946 Ariel was de-commissioned and returned to WSA for re-conversion as Jamaica to commercial service. The ship was returned to United Fruit in December 1947 and operated for that company until sold to a German company in 1957 to be renamed Blumenthal. The ship was scrapped in 1969.

== Construction ==
The Newport News Shipbuilding and Drydock Company of Newport News, Virginia built the ship as Peten for United Fruit Company's United Mail Steamship Company subsidiary. Peten was one of six UFC sister ships with General Electric turbo-electric transmission ordered in August 1930 to be built under the Merchant Marine Act of 1928. The other ships were Talamanca, first of the six to be launched, (Note: See Talamanca for additional design background.) and Chiriqui from Newport News Shipbuilding and Antigua, Quirigua and Veragua from Bethlehem Shipbuilding at Quincy, Massachusetts. The company designated the ships as its "Mail class" due to their design to meet requirements for mail carriage subsidies.

The basic design, implemented in Talamanca and the Newport News ships and with small modifications in the Bethlehem ships, was a ship of 446 ft 9 in (136.2 m) overall length, 430 ft (131.1 m) length on 24 ft (7.3 m) waterline, 415 ft (126.5 m) length between perpendiculars, 60 ft (18.3 m) molded beam, 36 ft 9 in (11.2 m) depth molded to upper deck, 24 ft 9 in (7.5 m) molded maximum draft, 11,345 tons displacement at maximum draft, 6,963 GRT, 3,183 NRT, 196,000 cu ft (5,550.1 m^{3}) cargo capacity, 1,450 tons of fuel oil and 626 tons fresh water capacity.

The prospective name for the ship had been Segovia, keel laid 9 March 1931 as hull #345, with launch on 15 August 1931. The launch was on the same day as Talamanca (hull #344) in a ceremony in which First Lady Lou Henry Hoover christened the ships with water gathered from Central American rivers. Segovia was almost completely destroyed by fire at the outfitting pier as it neared completion in December 1931. In the early morning of 20 December fire in one of the holds spread into the passenger areas. Water fighting the fires caused the ship to roll onto her starboard side. (Note: See photo of ship, still smoking.) The ship was rebuilt as hull #354 and christened 15 August 1932 as Peten, again by First Lady Hoover. Peten was delivered on 24 February 1933. The company's ships were named for mountain ranges, cities and provinces in Central and South America with Petén being a political region in Guatemala.

The ship was registered with U.S. Official Number 232139, signal KDCY at 6,968 GRT, 3,152 NRT, registry length of 415.4 ft (126.6 m), 60.2 ft (18.3 m) beam, 24 ft (7.3 m) depth, 10,500 horsepower, 113 crew with home port of New York and owner as United Mail Steamship Company.

== Commercial service ==
On 2 March 1933 Peten made her maiden voyage from New York to Caribbean ports. Peten, Quirigua and Veragua operating on a New York, Havana, Kingston, Cristobal, Limón and return to New York omitting Kingston as a port of call. The other three, Antigua, Talamanca and Chiriqui meanwhile operated on a San Francisco to Balboa route with return to San Francisco via Puerto Armuelles and Los Angeles. An intercoastal service for passengers and cargo was formed by the ships connecting in Panama. That schedule remained through 1936. In January 1939 all the ships operated on the New York to Panama route.

In 1937 she was transferred to United Fruit's direct ownership and renamed Jamaica.

== US Navy service ==
Jamaica was delivered to the War Shipping Administration (WSA) on 24 March 1942 at New Orleans under bareboat charter. Todd Pacific Shipyards of Galveston, Texas converted her for Navy use. She was renamed USS Ariel and commissioned at Galveston on 14 May 1942 with Captain E.P. Hylant as her commander.

On 25 May Ariel sailed for Norfolk, Virginia where she joined Service Squadron 7, Service Force, Atlantic Fleet. Over the next 18 months Ariel operated along the east coast and made numerous voyages to ports in the Caribbean including Bermuda, Trinidad, San Juan, Puerto Rico, Havana and Guantánamo Bay, Cuba.

In 1943 Ariel sailed to Iceland; leaving New York City on 15 August and reaching Reykjavík on 24 August. She returned to the east coast, arrived back at New York City on 7 September, and resumed her supply service to the Caribbean.

On 4 January 1944 the store ship left Norfolk, in convoy to the Mediterranean Sea. She called at Algiers, French Algeria on 24 January and soon sailed for Naples, Italy, where she unloaded supplies. She then sailed east and called at Oran, Algeria, in early February before sailing back across the Atlantic reaching New York City on 13 February.

Ariel sailed for the Caribbean on 20 February and called at St. Thomas, Virgin Islands, and San Juan, Puerto Rico, to unload. She then returned to New York. In late March, she commenced another voyage to Iceland and arrived back at New York on 10 April. After a few weeks of upkeep, Ariel sailed for the United Kingdom. On arrival she provided food and supplies to ships preparing for the cross-channel Invasion of Normandy. She operated from the ports of Clyde, Scotland; Belfast, Northern Ireland; and Plymouth and Portland Harbour, England. She left England on D-Day, 6 June, and returned to the United States.

Ariel reached New York on 16 June. After a fortnight of leave and upkeep she sailed to Norfolk. On 1 July she set out across the Atlantic to resupply Mediterranean ports. She unloaded stores and equipment at Oran and Naples before returning to the United States via a stop in the Azores, reaching New York on 3 August.

After a week in New York, Ariel made a round trip to supply Guantanamo Bay and Trinidad. In September she made a round trip from New York to Bermuda. On 20 September she sailed from Norfolk, VA to Oran and Naples. Her return voyage was to New York, where she arrived on 23 October. From there she took supplies to San Juan and Guantanamo Bay. In early November she returned to Norfolk for servicing. She returned to duty on 10 December, sailing laden for Oran and Naples. She returned to Norfolk on 6 February 1945. Later that month she made another round trip to Oran.

In March Ariel left New York for San Juan, Puerto Rico. She returned to the east coast and put into Boston, Massachusetts, on 12 April. From there she took a cargo to Argentia and arrived back at Boston in late April. She then took a cargo to Bermuda.

She continued her supply runs to Caribbean ports from New York, Norfolk, and Boston until 1946. On 12 May 1946 Ariel left New York for a final voyage to Reykjavík, where she docked on 29 May. She left for New York on 1 June, arrived a week later, and entered New York Naval Shipyard for decommissioning.

On 21 June 1946 Ariel was decommissioned at New York and transferred to the War Shipping Administration. Her name was struck from the Navy list on 3 July 1946 and returned to the United Fruit Company, under charter under her pre-war name Jamaica.

== Post-war service ==
Jamaica returned to liner work for United Fruit but later was sold to new owners. In April 1957 the ship was converted to a refrigerator type. Jamaica was sold in December 1957 to Union-Partenreederei T/S of Bremen, Germany, which also acquired her United Fruit sister ship Chiriqui. Union-Partenreederei changed Jamaica's name to D/S Blumenthal. She was scrapped in 1969 in Kaohsiung, Taiwan.

== Bibliography ==
- Colton, T. (2 May 2014). "Newport News Shipbuilding, Newport News VA". ShipbuildingHistory. T. Colton. Archived from the original on 26 October 2014.
- Maritime Administration. "Jamaica". Ship History Database Vessel Status Card. U.S. Department of Transportation, Maritime Administration.
- Naval History And Heritage Command. "Ariel". Dictionary of American Naval Fighting Ships. Naval History And Heritage Command.
- Pacific Marine Review (1932a). "Burned Liner Being Reconditioned". Pacific Marine Review. Consolidated 1932 issues (August 1932). 'Official Organ: Pacific American Steamship Association/Shipowners' Association of the Pacific Coast.
- Pacific Marine Review (1933). "Pacific Marine Review". Pacific Marine Review. Consolidated 1933 issues (February 1933). 'Official Organ: Pacific American Steamship Association/Shipowners' Association of the Pacific Coast.
- Naval History And Heritage Command (18 June 2015). "Ariel V (AF-22)". Dictionary of American Naval Fighting Ships. Naval History And Heritage Command.
