= USS Talamanca =

Cargo ship of the United States Navy

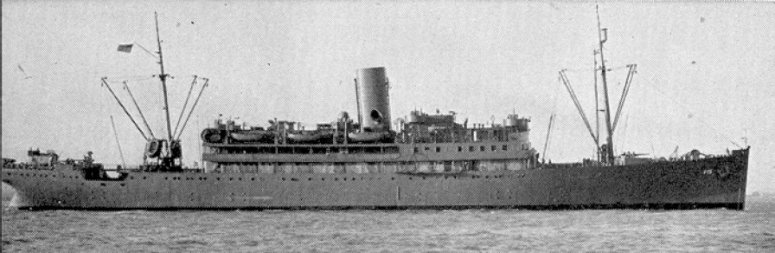

History

United States
- Name: Talamanca (1931–1958); Sulaco (1959–64) (United Kingdom)
- Owner: United Fruit Company (1931–58); Elders and Fyffes (1959–64)
- Operator: United Fruit Co (1932–41, 1946–58); United States Navy (1941–45); Elders and Fyffes (1959–64)
- Builder: Newport News Shipbuilding & Drydock Co
- Yard number: 344
- Laid down: 2 February 1931
- Launched: 15 August 1931 (Note: In twin launching ceremony with Segovia, later Peten.)
- Acquired: Delivered 12 December 1931; Navy: 16 December 1941 bareboat charter
- Commissioned: USS Talamanca AF-15, 28 January 1942
- Decommissioned: 29 November 1945
- Stricken: 19 December 1945
- Identification: U.S. Official Number: 231349; Signal: KDCC
- Fate: Scrapped 1965
- Notes: USS Talamanca (1941–45)

General characteristics
- Class & type: "Mail class" (United Fruit); Navy: Mizar-class stores ship
- Type: civilian: passenger & cargo liner
- Tonnage: 6,963 GRT, 3,183 NRT
- Displacement: 11,345 tons (at maximum draft)
- Length: 447 ft 9 in (136.47 m) (LOA); 415.4 ft (126.6 m) (Registry)
- Beam: 60.2 ft (18.3 m)
- Draft: 25 ft 2 in (7.67 m)
- Depth: 24 ft (7.3 m)
- Installed power: 4 oil fired Babcock & Wilcox header-type boilers, 350 psi 230° superheat driving GE generator sets for main propulsion and auxiliary power
- Propulsion: 2 GE 4,200 kw, 5,500 hp at 125 rpm, twin 15 ft 6 in (4.7 m), 3 blade screws
- Speed: 17.5 kn (20.1 mph; 32.4 km/h) (Contract service speed); 18 knots (21 mph; 33 km/h) (max)
- Capacity: Commercial: Passengers: design 113, postwar 95; 196,000 cu ft (5,550.1 m^{3})
- Complement: Navy: 238
- Crew: Commercial: 113
- Armament: one single 5 in (130 mm) dual purpose gun mount, four single 3 in (76 mm) dual purpose gun mounts

USS Talamanca (AF-15) was the United Fruit Company cargo and passenger liner Talamanca that served as a United States Navy Mizar-class stores ship in World War II.

Talamanca was the lead ship of six fast, turbo-electric transmission ships built primarily for banana transport for the United Fruit Company subsidiary shipping line, United Mail Steamship Company. The new ships were larger than previous fruit carriers and designed for substantial passenger service and to take advantage of new mail carriage subsidies. As a result of the later they were described by the company as its "Mail class" ships. In early commercial service three of the ships served on the Atlantic coast to Panama and three on the Pacific coast to Panama with inter coastal connections made at Panamanian ports.

All of the ships, including Talamanca were delivered to the War Shipping Administration (WSA) for wartime operation. United Fruit retained ownership of all the ships which operated under bareboat charter by WSA with five of the ships sub bareboat chartered to the Navy which operated them as commissioned naval vessels. Talamanca was delivered to WSA and the Navy on 16 December 1941, converted for naval use and commissioned USS Talamanca with the designation AF-15 on 28 January 1942. The ship operated in the Pacific throughout the war. At the end of her naval service the ship again transported bananas, loaded during a stop at Puerto Armuelles, Panama, in transit from Hawaii to New Orleans for decommissioning which took place 29 November 1945. The ship was immediately delivered to WSA's agent, United Fruit, for the process of conversion back to the company's commercial service. On 8 July 1947 Talamanca was returned to the company for commercial service.

In 1958 United Fruit transferred Talamanca to its British subsidiary Elders and Fyffes which renamed the vessel Sulaco and operated the ship until retirement in 1964. Sulaco arrived in Bruges, Belgium 28 July 1964 for scrapping which took place in 1965.

== Construction ==
Talamanca was laid down as hull number 344 by the Newport News Shipbuilding & Drydock Company of Newport News, Virginia on 2 February 1931 as the first of six sister ships driven by turbo-electric transmission. The company's ships were named for cities, provinces or mountain ranges in Central and South America. Talamanca qualifies as a mountain range, Cordillera de Talamanca and the region of the Kingdom of Talamanca. (Note: The name was given to a political subdivision of Costa Rica in 1969, Talamanca (canton).) The six ships were ordered in August 1930 and built under the Merchant Marine Act of 1928 (Jones-White Act) for the United Mail Steamship Company, a subsidiary of the United Fruit Company, designed with specialized cooling and handling arrangements for transporting bananas.

The six ships were the first for the line not built in Europe. Construction in U.S. yards was a result of the Merchant Marine Act and more liberal government support in the form of mail contracts. The company designated the ships as its "Mail class" due to their design to meet requirements for mail carriage subsidies. Three of the ships were built by Newport News Shipbuilding with Talamanca being the first of the group and class followed by Chiriqui and Peten (originally Segovia, later Jamaica) with Antigua, Quirigua and Veragua by Bethlehem Shipbuilding, Baltimore.

Design of the ships was driven by the fact that bananas, requiring refrigeration, were the primary cargo and the United States government subsidies required compliance with the latest safety measures. The "two compartment" rule requiring the ship to stay afloat with any two compartments flooded was an expensive feature. The ships were subdivided into nine compartments by eight watertight bulkheads. As a result of shorter compartments more refrigeration equipment was required driving costs and requiring larger ships for the same amount of fruit cargo than earlier banana boats. Fourteen refrigerated cargo compartments were located in two cork insulated holds forward and two aft of the central superstructure with York Ice Machinery Corporation refrigeration units located below the orlop deck aft. The holds were used for general cargo on southbound trips with steel being one of the main items. Aft at the main deck level was a special hold for cargo such as meat requiring lower temperatures than the fruit. The larger hull also allowed for more passenger space. The mail contracts were met with a special bulk mail compartment and strong room for carriage of bullion and other valuables was located starboard at main deck level with direct access through entry ports.

The larger ships allowed features of ocean liners previously not incorporated into the company's ships. Accommodations for 113 passengers in 61 rooms, all first class, with public areas that included a swimming pool and deck ballroom. The ballroom had large windows making it practically open air and lighting to imitate moonlight. Public rooms were decorated in a "modern Spanish" style. The dining room could seat 108 at small tables in one sitting. The lounge, with hardwood floors, could also be used for formal, inside dancing.

A turbo-electric transmission system with four Babcock & Wilcox oil fired boilers providing steam for two turbine driven General Electric (GE) generators and auxiliary generator sets for ship's power met contract requirements for sustained speed of 17.5 kn (20.1 mph; 32.4 km/h) and guaranteed 10,500 horsepower. (Note: in trials some of the ships made over 19 kn (22 mph; 35 km/h)) Propulsion was by two 3,150 volt, 4,200 kilowatt, 5,500 horsepower at 125 revolutions GE electric motors driving twin 15 ft 6 in (4.7 m), 3 blade screws. Ship's service electricity was provided by three GE turbine generator sets, 500 kilowatts each with 120 and 240 volt service, driven by steam from the boilers to power electric motors on auxiliaries and deck machinery as well as the electrical systems for quarters and navigation. All auxiliaries normally required at sea were electric motor driven.

The basic design implemented in Talamanca was a ship of 446 ft 9 in (136.2 m) overall length, 430 ft (131.1 m) length on 24 ft (7.3 m) waterline, 415 ft (126.5 m) length between perpendiculars, 60 ft (18.3 m) molded beam, 36 ft 9 in (11.2 m) depth molded to upper deck, 24 ft 9 in (7.5 m) molded maximum draft, 11,345 tons displacement at maximum draft, 6,963 GRT, 3,183 NRT, 196,000 cu ft (5,550.1 m^{3}) cargo capacity, 1,450 tons of fuel oil and 626 tons fresh water capacity.

Talamanca was launched 15 August 1931 in a twin ceremony with Segovia (hull #345) in which First Lady Lou Henry Hoover christened both ships with water gathered from Central American rivers. Talamanca was delivered 12 December 1931, but Segovia burned at the fitting out pier to be rebuilt and renamed Peten in another ceremony with Mrs. Hoover on the anniversary of the launch. The ship was registered with U.S. Official Number 231349, signal KDCC, at 6,963 GRT, 3,183 NRT, registry length of 415.4 ft (126.6 m), 60.2 ft (18.3 m) beam, 24 ft (7.3 m) depth, 10,500 horsepower, 113 crew and home port of New York.

== Commercial service ==
United Fruit placed Talamanca on express liner services between Central America and San Francisco along with Antigua and Chiriqui. The January—March schedule for 1933 shows the route as San Francisco to Balboa with return to San Francisco to include calls at Puerto Armuelles and Los Angeles. Effective May 1933 with Antigua sailing for Balboa the three ships maintained a weekly service taking eight days between San Francisco and Balboa with round trip for each ship taking nineteen days. Intercoastal connecting service for passengers and cargo was formed by the ships connecting in Panama. That schedule remained through 1936. In January 1939 all the ships operated on the New York to Panama route.

== US Navy service ==
United Fruit delivered Talamanca to the War Shipping Administration (WSA) on 16 December 1941 at New York under bareboat charter with WSA simultaneously delivering the ship to the Navy under sub bareboat charter. The Maryland Drydock Company of Baltimore, Maryland converted Talamanca for Navy use with the Navy designating the ship AF-15 on 27 December 1941. On 28 January 1942 the Navy commissioned the ship as USS Talamanca under the command of Commander Nathan W. Bard.

Talamanca sailed for the first time as a naval vessel on 13 February. Six days later, laden with cargo, passengers and mail, she transited the Panama Canal. She proceeded via Talara, Peru, across the southern Pacific and reached Wellington Harbour, New Zealand on 16 March. She then made a round trip across the Tasman Sea to Melbourne, Australia and back to Wellington. On 1 April she sailed for the United States. She called at Manzanillo, Mexico on the 16th and reached San Francisco, California, on 21 April. Between 9 May and 1 June, she made a round trip from San Francisco to Pearl Harbor and back. Shes spent the whole of June in the Mare Island Navy Yard, undergoing further conversion and some repairs.

Talamanca left San Francisco on 8 July with a Hawaii-bound convoy. She reached Pearl Harbor on the 16th and stayed there for five days loading fuel and stores before heading southwest on the 21st. On 1 August she left the convoy, headed via the Fiji for New Zealand, reaching Auckland on the 7th.

For the next three years Auckland was Talamanca's home port. Between August 1942 and April 1945, she plied the southwestern Pacific supplying US bases. She visited such places as Fiji; Espiritu Santo; Efate; Manus; and Napier, New Zealand. The closest she ever came to the combat zone were stops at Guadalcanal, Tulagi, Florida Island, and the Russell Islands in the Solomon Islands. However, these voyages were in 1944 after the fighting had moved up the Solomons chain past Bougainville and into the Bismarck Archipelago. In all, Talamanca made 36 resupply voyages from Auckland to various bases in the South Pacific and back again, all of them relatively routine.

On 28 April 1945 Talamanca left Auckland for the last time. She headed to Noumea, New Caledonia, thence to Manus, and then to the Marianas. She reached Saipan on 10 May; discharged some of her cargo; and, on the 15th, went to Tinian where she discharged the rest of her cargo. From Tinian she sailed via Eniwetok Atoll for the West Coast of the United States. She entered San Pedro, California, on 2 June 1945 and loaded cargo. On the 9th she returned to the western Pacific. After fuel and water stops at Pearl Harbor and Eniwetok, Talamanca entered Apra Harbor, Guam, on 26 June. She unloaded her cargo and, four days later, sailed for Manus. She reached Manus on 3 July, embarked patients from the hospital for transport and left on 5 July for the United States. She called at Pearl Harbor on 13 July and entered San Francisco Bay on the 19th.

Her passengers disembarked, Talamanca moored at a pier at the Moore Dry Dock Co. for overhaul. Overhaul and repairs were completed on 31 August, and after degaussing, compass compensation, and trials she began loading cargo on 3 September. On the 9th, she left San Francisco Bay for Pearl Harbor, where she arrived on the 14th. Two days later she left for Eniwetok where she stopped on the 23rd for fuel and water. From there she went to Guam, and thence to Iwo Jima where she unloaded cargo. On 8 October Talamanca left Iwo Jima with passengers for Saipan, where she arrived that afternoon. Her passengers disembarked that day and her cargo was unloaded the next day. After calling at Guam to embark passengers she left for Hawaii and the United States. She called at Pearl Harbor from 27 to 29 October and then continued to Panama.

Talamanca reverted to her original employment as a fruit carrier on 10 November when she loaded bananas at Puerto Armuelles, Panama, for the War Shipping Administration. She transited the canal on the 13th and sailed for New Orleans, Louisiana, the next day.

Talamanca reached New Orleans on 18 November 1945 for decommissioning on 29 November 1945 and delivery to the War Shipping Administration's operating agent United Fruit the same day. The name Talamanca was stricken from the Navy list on 19 December 1945. United Fruit operated the ship under a General Agency Agreement with the War Shipping Administration for conversion to company use and operation until fully returned to the company on 8 July 1947.

== Post-war civilian service ==
In November 1958 United Fruit transferred Talamanca to its British subsidiary Elders and Fyffes. Talamanca was renamed SS Sulaco after an earlier Fyffes ship of the same name. (Note: Sister ships Quirigua and Veragua also became Elders and Fyffes fruit carriers.))

As Sulaco the ship served in the Fyffes fleet until she was retired in 1964. On 28 July that year she arrived in Bruges, Belgium to be scrapped. She was broken up in August 1964.

== Bibliography ==
- Beyer, Edward F. (1986). "Question 11/85". Warship International. XXIII (3): 312. ISSN 0043-0374.
