= USS Tarazed =

Cargo ship of the United States Navy

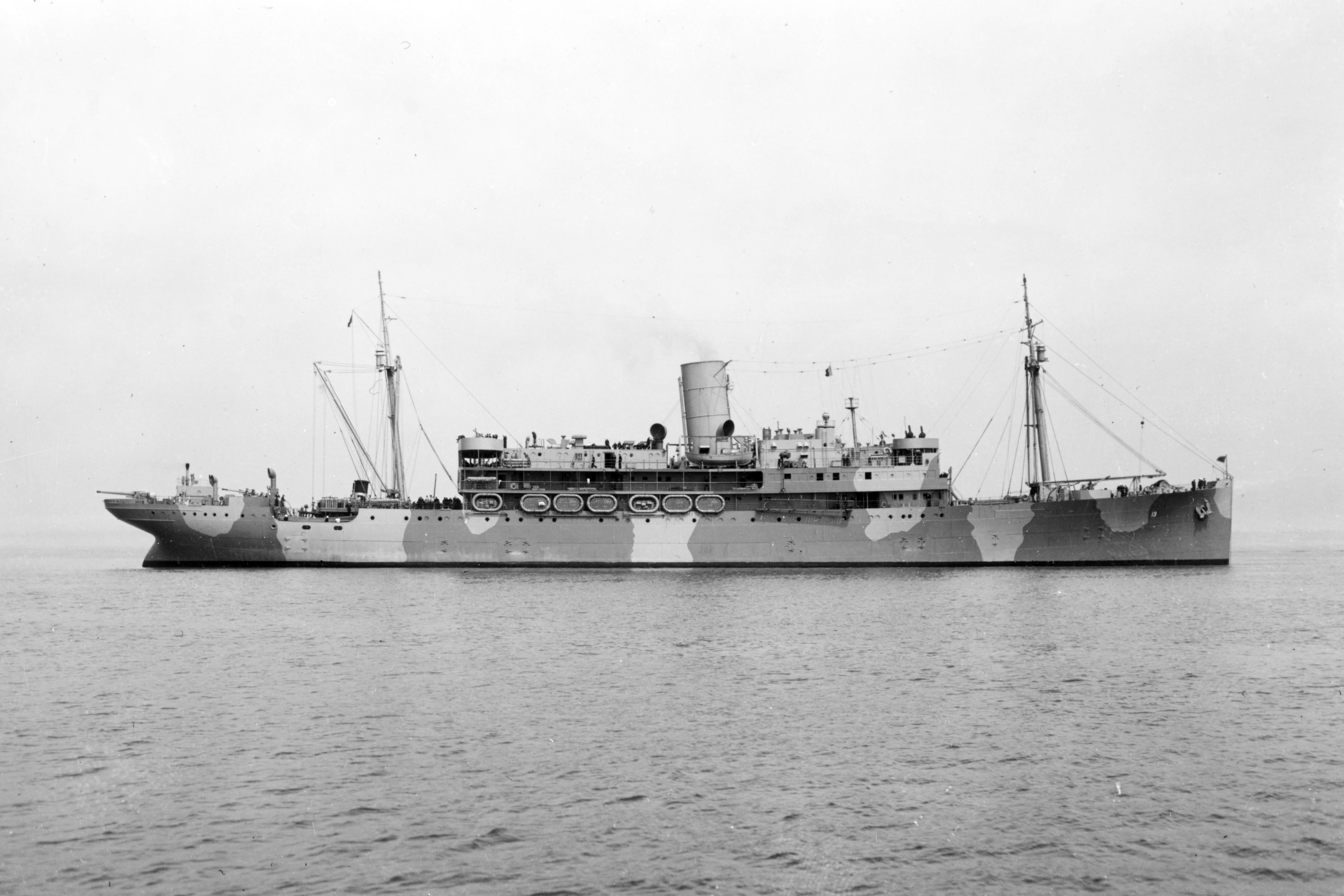

History

United States, Germany
- Name: Chiriqui (1932–41, 1946–58); Tarazed (1941–46); Blexen (1958–71)
- Namesake: Chiriquí Province, Panama; Tarazed, a star in the constellation Aquila
- Owner: United Fruit Company (1932–58); Union-Partenreederei T/S (1958–71)
- Operator: United Fruit Company (1932–41, 1946–58); United States Navy (1941–46); Union-Partenreederei T/S (1958–71)
- Builder: Newport News Shipbuilding & Drydock Co
- Yard number: 346
- Laid down: 27 April 1931
- Launched: 14 November 1931
- Acquired: Delivered: 18 March 1932; Navy: 4 June 1941 sub bareboat charter from WSA
- Commissioned: 14 June 1941
- Decommissioned: 4 January 1946
- Maiden voyage: 24 March 1932 (New York-San Francisco)
- In service: 18 March 1932
- Stricken: 21 January 1946
- Home port: New York
- Identification: U.S. Official Number: 231468; Signal KDCH
- Fate: Scrapped 1971

General characteristics
- Class & type: "Mail class" company designation; Navy: Mizar-class stores ship
- Type: civilian: passenger & cargo liner
- Tonnage: 6,963 GRT, 3,184 NRT
- Displacement: 11,345 tons (at maximum draft)
- Length: 447 ft 10 in (136.50 m) (LOA); 415.4 ft (126.6 m) (Registry)
- Beam: 60.2 ft (18.3 m)
- Draft: 26 ft (7.9 m)
- Depth: 24 ft (7.3 m)
- Installed power: 4 oil fired Babcock & Wilcox header-type boilers, 350 psi 230° superheat driving GE generator sets for main propulsion and auxiliary power
- Propulsion: 2 GE 4,200 kw, 5,500 hp at 125 rpm, twin 15 ft 6 in (4.7 m), 3 blade screws
- Speed: 17.5 kn (20.1 mph; 32.4 km/h) (Contract service speed); 18 knots (21 mph; 33 km/h) (max)
- Capacity: Commercial: Passengers: design 113, postwar 95; 196,000 cu ft (5,550.1 m^{3})
- Complement: 238
- Crew: Commercial: 105
- Armament: one single 5 in (130 mm)/38 dual purpose gun mount, four 3 in (76 mm) guns

USS Tarazed (AF-13) was the United Fruit Company cargo and passenger liner Chiriqui that was acquired by the United States Navy through a sub bareboat charter from the War Shipping Administration (WSA) which acquired the ship by bareboat charter from the company. The ship served as a Mizar-class stores ship in World War II. In peacetime before and after the war she carried fruit and passengers; in war she supplied troops and ships in the field. In 1958 she was sold to a German shipping line and renamed Blexen which was scrapped in 1971 after 39 years' service.

== Construction ==
Chiriqui was built by the Newport News Shipbuilding and Drydock Company of Newport News, Virginia for the United Mail Steamship Company, a subsidiary of the United Fruit Company, in 1932 as one of six sister ships driven by turbo-electric transmission. Three of the ships were built by Newport News Shipbuilding with Talamanca being the first of the group and class followed by Chiriqui and Peten (originally Segovia, later Jamaica) with Antigua, Quirigua and Veragua built by Bethlehem Shipbuilding, Baltimore. Chiriqui was laid down 27 April 1931 as yard hull number 346, launched 14 November 1931 and delivered 18 March 1932. The ship was named for Chiriquí Province, Panama.

Basic design parameters for all six ships, designated the company's "Mail class" due to the design including requirements for mail carriage contracts, were first implemented in Talamanca at Newport News and later in the other two ships built there including Chiriqui. (Note: Talamanca, launched 15 August 1931, was the first of the six to be launched. Each of the two builders was allowed to make small modifications to the basic design.) That design was for a ship 446 ft 9 in (136.2 m) overall length, 430 ft (131.1 m) length on 24 ft (7.3 m) waterline, 415 ft (126.5 m) length between perpendiculars, 60 ft (18.3 m) molded beam, 36 ft 9 in (11.2 m) depth molded to upper deck, 24 ft 9 in (7.5 m) molded maximum draft, 11,345 tons displacement at maximum draft, 6,963 GRT, 3,183 NRT, 196,000 cu ft (5,550.1 m^{3}) cargo capacity, 1,450 tons of fuel oil and 626 tons fresh water capacity.

Chiriqui was registered with U.S. Official Number 231468, signal KDCH, at 6,963 GRT, 3,184 NRT, registry length of 415.4 ft (126.6 m), 60.2 ft (18.3 m) beam, 24 ft (7.3 m) depth, 10,500 horsepower, 105 crew and home port of New York.

== Commercial service ==
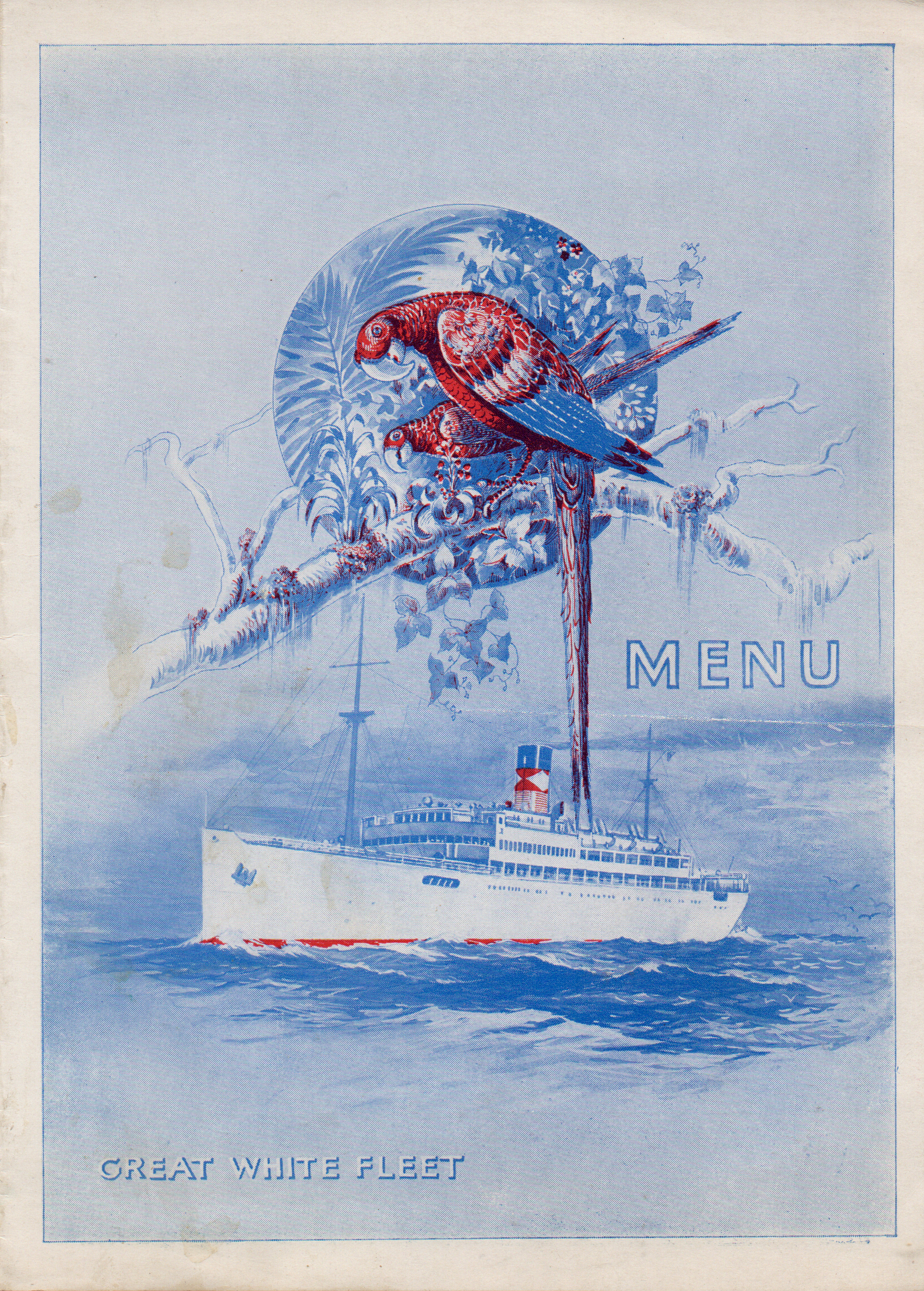
Dinner menu cover, United Fruit Company Steamship Service ("Great White Fleet"). Chiriqui at sea.

Chiriqui arrived in New York 17 March for delivery the next day and sailed 24 March 1932 for San Francisco to be placed in service on the company's Pacific coast routes from San Francisco to Panama.

The January—March schedule for 1933 shows Chiriqui, Talamanca and Antigua on the route San Francisco to Balboa, Panama with return to San Francisco to include calls at Puerto Armuelles, Panama and Los Angeles. Effective May 1933 with Antigua sailing for Balboa the three ships maintained a weekly service taking eight days between San Francisco and Balboa with round trip for each ship taking nineteen days. Intercoastal connecting service for passengers and cargo was formed by the ships connecting in Panama. That schedule remained through 1936. In January 1939 the Pacific ships changed to operate on the New York to Panama route.

== US Navy service ==
United Fruit delivered Chiriqui to the government on 4 June 1941 at New York to be operated under bareboat charter. (Note: On 7 February 1942 the functions of the Maritime Commission regarding operation of commercial sea going ships was assumed by the War Shipping Administration. Vice Admiral Emory S. Land continued as head of the Maritime Commission while also heading the WSA.) The ship was delivered to the Navy under sub bareboat charter the same day for conversion at Brewer's Drydock Co. of Staten Island, New York for Navy use. On 14 June 1941 the ship was commissioned USS Tarazed, designated AF-13, under the command of Commander J.M. Connally.

Tarazed loaded supplies sailed to North Carolina to supply ships of the Neutrality Patrol. After returning to New York City, she left late in August for a voyage to Iceland to resupply US and Royal Navy ships.

When the Japanese attack on Pearl Harbor brought the United States into World War II, Tarazed was at Halifax, Nova Scotia preparing to join another convoy to Iceland. Upon completion of the voyage she went to Baltimore, Maryland, for an extensive overhaul before making resupply runs to Newfoundland, Iceland and Bermuda.

In July 1942 Tarazed reached Boston, Massachusetts, from Nova Scotia and loaded a cargo for Puerto Rico, Trinidad and Panama. On 21 September she returned to Baltimore with a cargo of sugar. She continued supply runs from Baltimore or Norfolk, Virginia, to the Caribbean until mid-1943.

On 8 June 1943 Tarazed joined Task Force 65 at Norfolk – headed for North Africa – and arrived at Mers el Kebir, Algeria, on 22 June. She partially unloaded there and, on the 30th, took the rest of her cargo to Oran. On 4 July, Tarazed left for the US in convoy GUS-9. She reached Norfolk, VA on 23 July, was replenished, and left for Bermuda. After supplying Bermuda and Cuba she returned to the US, reaching Bayonne, New Jersey, on 13 August 1943. Eight days later Tarazed left for North Africa, reaching Mers el Kebir on 2 September. After calling at Bizerte and Algiers, she returned to the US in convoy GUS-15 and arrived at Norfolk on 4 October 1943. Late that month, she joined convoy UGS-22 to take materiel to Oran, Bizerte and Palermo. Then, with the exception of a voyage to the Mediterranean in April 1944, she took provisions to the Caribbean in the first five months of 1944.

In June 1944, Tarazed delivered provisions to ships in the ports of Plymouth, Swansea and Portland Harbour in Britain and at Belfast in Northern Ireland. She steamed from Norfolk on 24 August and arrived at Oran on 4 September 1944 to supply ships supporting the invasion of southern France. She continued logistics runs to the Mediterranean into April 1945 and turned to supplying bases and ports in the Caribbean until 14 December 1945 when she was ordered to report to the 8th Naval District for disposal.

== Post-war service ==
Tarazed was decommissioned at New Orleans, Louisiana on 4 January 1946 receiving one battle star for World War II. On the same day the ship was returned to the War Shipping Administration for operation as Chiriqui by United Fruit under a WSA General Agency Agreement for conversion back to commercial service. The name Tarazed was struck from the Navy list on 21 January 1946. On 15 June 1947 the ship was redelivered to United Fruit for commercial operation. Schedules for 1950 show Chiriqui, Antigua and Quirigua operating from New Orleans to Havana and Puerto Barrios, Guatemala returning to New Orleans. A 1952 schedule shows Chiriqui and Quirigua operating a route of New Orleans to Cristóbal, Panama and Tela, Honduras with return to New Orleans.

In September 1957 United Fruit sold Chiriqui to Union-Partenreederei T/S of Bremen, Germany, which also acquired her United Fruit sister ship Jamaica. Union-Partenreederei changed Chiriqui's name to D/S Blexen.
