= USS Roamer (AF-19) =

Danish motorship, seized by the U.S. navy during World War II

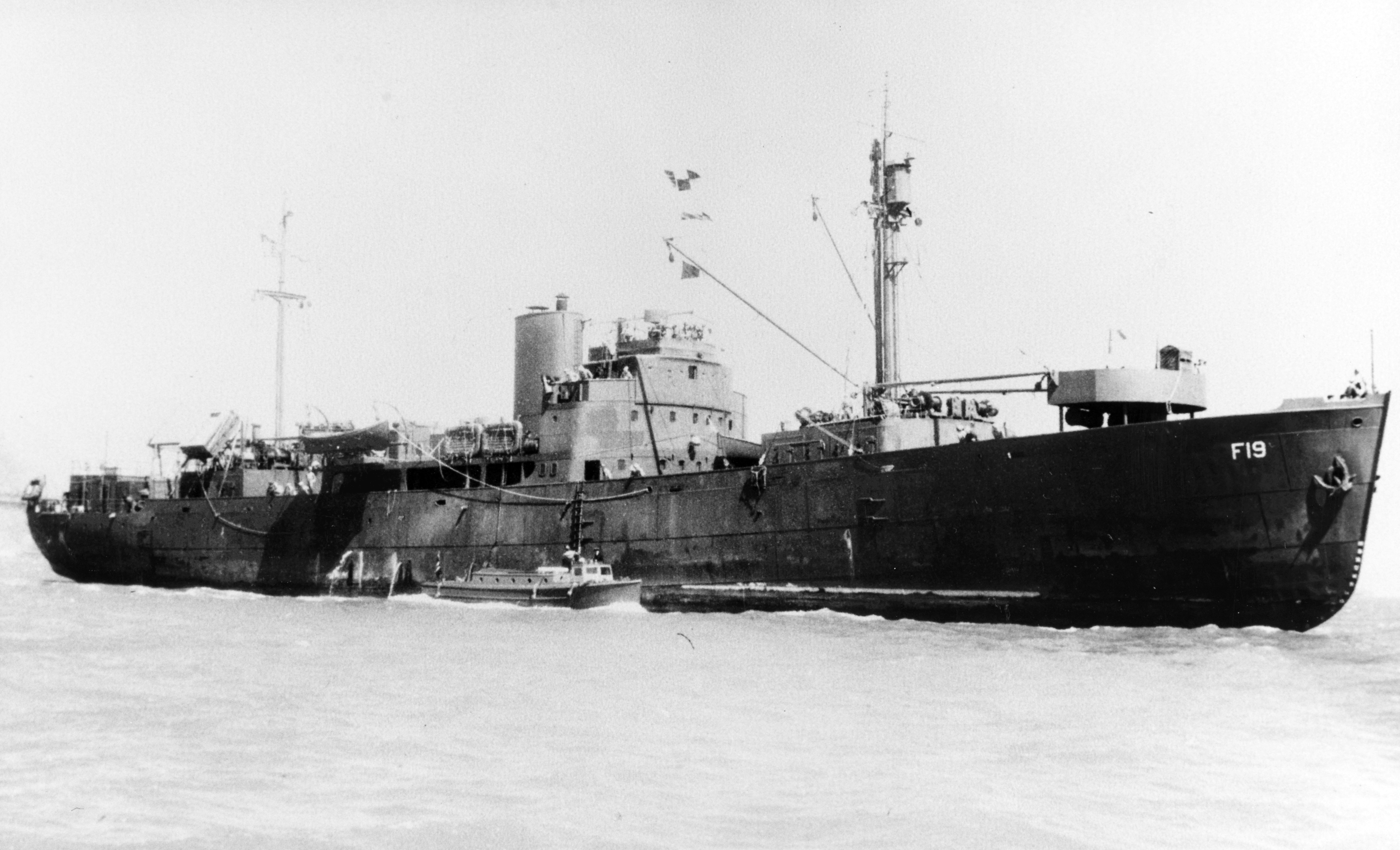

History

United States
- Name: Pacific Reefer; Yrsa (for trials); African Reefer; Roamer (after seizure); Pacific Reefer on return to owners
- Owner: J. Lauritzen shipping company, Denmark (1935-1941); U.S. Maritime Commission (seizure, 1941-1946); Rederiet Ocean Aktieselskab, Copenhagen, Denmark (1946-?)
- Port of registry: Denmark
- Builder: Helsingør Jernskibs og Maskinbyggeri, Helsingør, Denmark
- Laid down: date unknown
- Launched: 14 September 1935
- Acquired: by Navy 22 July 1942
- Commissioned: by Navy 30 August 1942
- Decommissioned: by Navy 7 May 1946
- Stricken: 3 July 1946
- Identification: IMO 5004362
- Fate: Returned to owners 14 June 1946. Resumed operation as African Reefer until 1963 when sold for scrapping.

General characteristics
- Displacement: 1,770 t.(lt) 2,550 t.(fl)
- Length: 318 ft 6 in (97.08 m)
- Beam: 42 ft 7 in (12.98 m)
- Draught: 18 ft 5 in (5.61 m)
- Propulsion: diesel, single propeller, 1,755shp
- Speed: 13 kts.
- Complement: 41
- Armament: two single 3 in (76 mm) dual purpose gun mounts; two twin 20 mm AA gun mounts

USS Roamer (AF-19) was the Danish refrigerated motorship African Reefer, completed 1935, (Note: The name was reused on later J. Lauritzen refrigerated vessels. Even later, as the company moved into bulk carriers, a variant African Bulker (2015, IMO 9736418) is in use.) of the J. Lauritzen shipping company which had put in at Madeira after Germany occupied Denmark. The ship later sailed to a U.S. port on assurances it would be treated equally with U.S. vessels chartered for war purposes. Instead it was seized by the United States Maritime Commission and placed in service under War Shipping Administration (WSA) allotment to commercial, Army transport and finally Navy use at half the rate paid for U.S. ships. The agreed to rate was not restored until 1958 after a Supreme Court judgement and Congressional action.

African Reefer had operated as a commercial refrigerated fruit carrier until seizure. After July 1942 the vessel operated in the Pacific as part of Service Force, Pacific Fleet. The vessel was returned to post war owners 14 June 1946 at San Francisco.

== Commercial service ==
The motorship was built by Helsingør Jernskibs og Maskinbyggeri, Helsingør (Elsinore), Denmark. The ship was launched 14 September 1935 as Pacific Reefer, but performed trials as Yrsa and in 1936 was renamed for the refrigerated fruit trade for Denmark's J. Lauritzen shipping line as African Reefer, IMO 5004362. In 1938 the ship transported one of the first refrigerated fruit cargoes from Puerto Armuelles, Panama to San Francisco after the U.S. shipping lines ceased operation on the route.

== Wartime seizure ==
African Reefer was en route from the United States to the Mediterranean on 9 April 1940 when Germany occupied Denmark. The ship was directed by the company to put into Funchal, Madeira. African Reefer was laid up there until August 1941 when the ship left Funchal for New York. On 6 June 1941 the ship, which had sailed to a U.S. port on specific promises of equal treatment to U.S. vessels, was one of forty Danish vessels seized by the United States Maritime Commission.

On 5 September 1941 the ship, renamed Roamer, was delivered to the War Shipping Administration (WSA) for operation by its agent, Marine Operating Company, Inc., under the Panamanian flag until delivered on 3 December 1941 for operation by the War Department under bareboat charter as an Army transport. The ship was returned to WSA and Marine Operating Company service on 18 March 1942 at New York. The Navy and WSA were negotiating charter arrangements for the ship, again allocated to Army requirements, with the result that WSA, Navy, and Army agreed to allocate the ship to Service Force, Pacific Fleet as a stores provision ship. The ship had sailed in July for New Zealand so that the Navy sent a naval crew to the ship at Auckland, New Zealand which was turned over to the Navy on bareboat charter on 22 July 1942. Roamer was commissioned at Auckland on 30 August 1942.

== Service career ==
The storeship arrived at New Caledonia on 15 September, returned to Auckland, New Zealand, 8 October, and reached Espiritu Santo 27 December. She continued runs from Auckland to the New Hebrides, and to Guadalcanal, until April 1944. She then stopped at Pago Pago, Tongatapu, Funafuti, Wallis, Tutuila, and Efate.

Returning to Nouméa on 2 May, she touched at Suva, Funafuti, Tutuila, and Tongatapu before returning to Auckland. She then proceeded north again to Tutuila, Tongatapu, and Guadalcanal. Returning to Auckland on 2 November, she continued to make runs north from New Zealand for the rest of the war. On 5 September 1945, she departed Auckland for Pearl Harbor and San Francisco.

Returning to the South Pacific in February 1946, Roamer touched at Tutuila, Nouméa, Guadalcanal, and Guam, then proceeded on to Tokyo arriving 16 April. Departing Japan 6 days later, Roamer arrived at San Francisco, California, on 7 May 1946, decommissioned and was redelivered to WSA on 14 June 1946 and was struck from the Navy List on 3 July 1946.

=== Military awards and honors ===
Roamer's crew members were authorized the following medals:

- American Campaign Medal
- Asiatic-Pacific Campaign Medal
- World War II Victory Medal

== Return to Danish control ==
On 14 June 1946 African Reefer was returned to owners Rederiet Ocean Aktieselskab (then a subsidiary of J. Lauritzen), Copenhagen, Denmark under Public Law 101 at San Francisco.

African Reefer had been seized with the Danish Minister consenting under the condition that the ship's title remain with Denmark and the seizure only for use. Further, that the payment for use be equal for that of U.S. ships under charter. Both the Secretary and Assistant Secretary of State had affirmed to Congress that the ships would be justly compensated at full value. African Reefer had sailed from Madeira to the United States under that specific understanding. Instead the titles to the ships had been seized and they had been hired at a rate 50% below the U.S. vessel charter rate. The case, upon failure of negotiations, went to the Supreme Court which affirmed that the vessel should be paid at the full value yet only by Congressional action in 1958 was the settlement for full payment made.

In 1963 the ship was sold to breakers in Rotterdam. A part of the hull was used as a floating Chinese restaurant in Lobith, Netherlands.

== See also ==
- USS Pontiac (AF-20) (J. Lauretzen Australian Reefer)
