= Merchant Marine Act of 1928 =

US federal law

- Other short titles: Jones-White Act
- Long title: An Act To develop the American merchant marine, to meet national emergencies, and for other purposes
- Enacted by: the 70th United States Congress

Citations
- Public law: Pub. L. 70–463
- Statutes at Large: 45 Stat. 689

Codification
- Acts amended: Merchant Marine Act of 1920
- Titles amended: 46

Legislative history
- Introduced in the House as H.R. 13217 by Wesley L. Jones / Wallace H. White Jr.; Committee consideration by House Merchant Marine and Fisheries; Passed the House on; Passed the Senate on; Signed into law by President Calvin Coolidge on May 22, 1928

Major amendments
- Merchant Marine Act of 1936

The Merchant Marine Act of 1928 (also called the "Jones-White Act") is a United States law to stimulate private shipbuilding in the United States and to assist the merchant marine financially in being competitive in the emerging global market. It is printed in the United States Code in Title 46A (Shipping Appendix) Chapter 24A.

It was sponsored by Sen. Wesley L. Jones (R) of Washington and Sen. Wallace H. White (R) of Maine. It did not repeal the La Follette Seamen's Act of 1915, but instead created Federal export subsidies to big shipping firms. The subsidies were purported to offset the cost of having to pay seamen higher wages under the earlier act; however, the subsidies were larger than wage differences.
