= Orlop deck =

Lowest deck of a ship

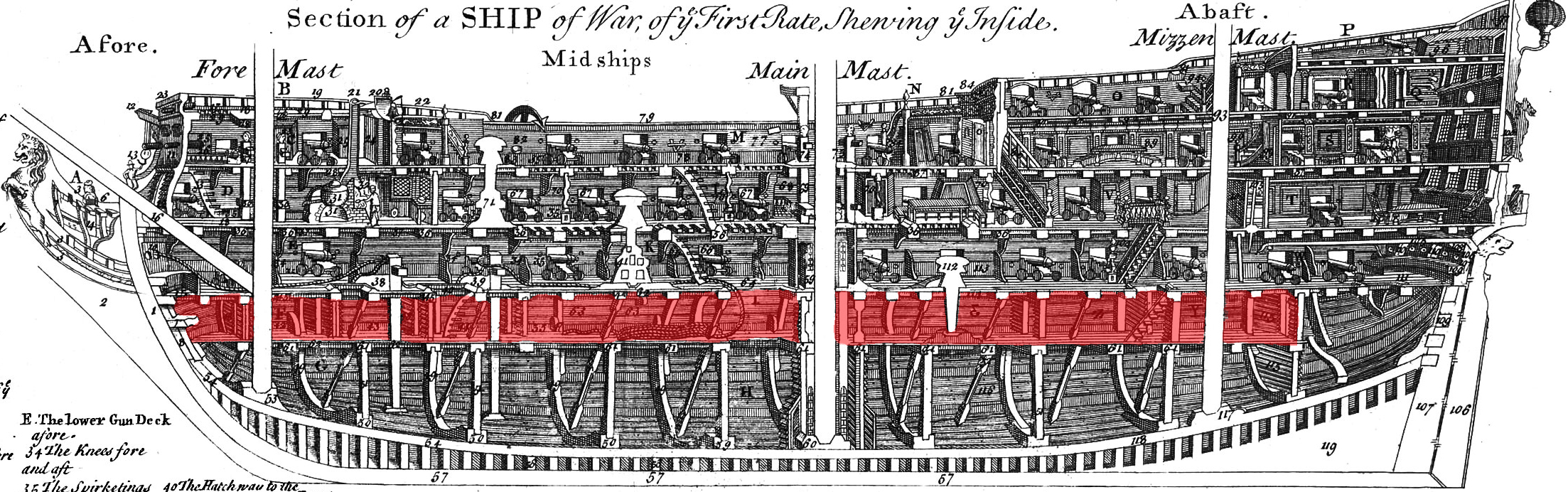
18th century warship cross section, the orlop deck highlighted in red

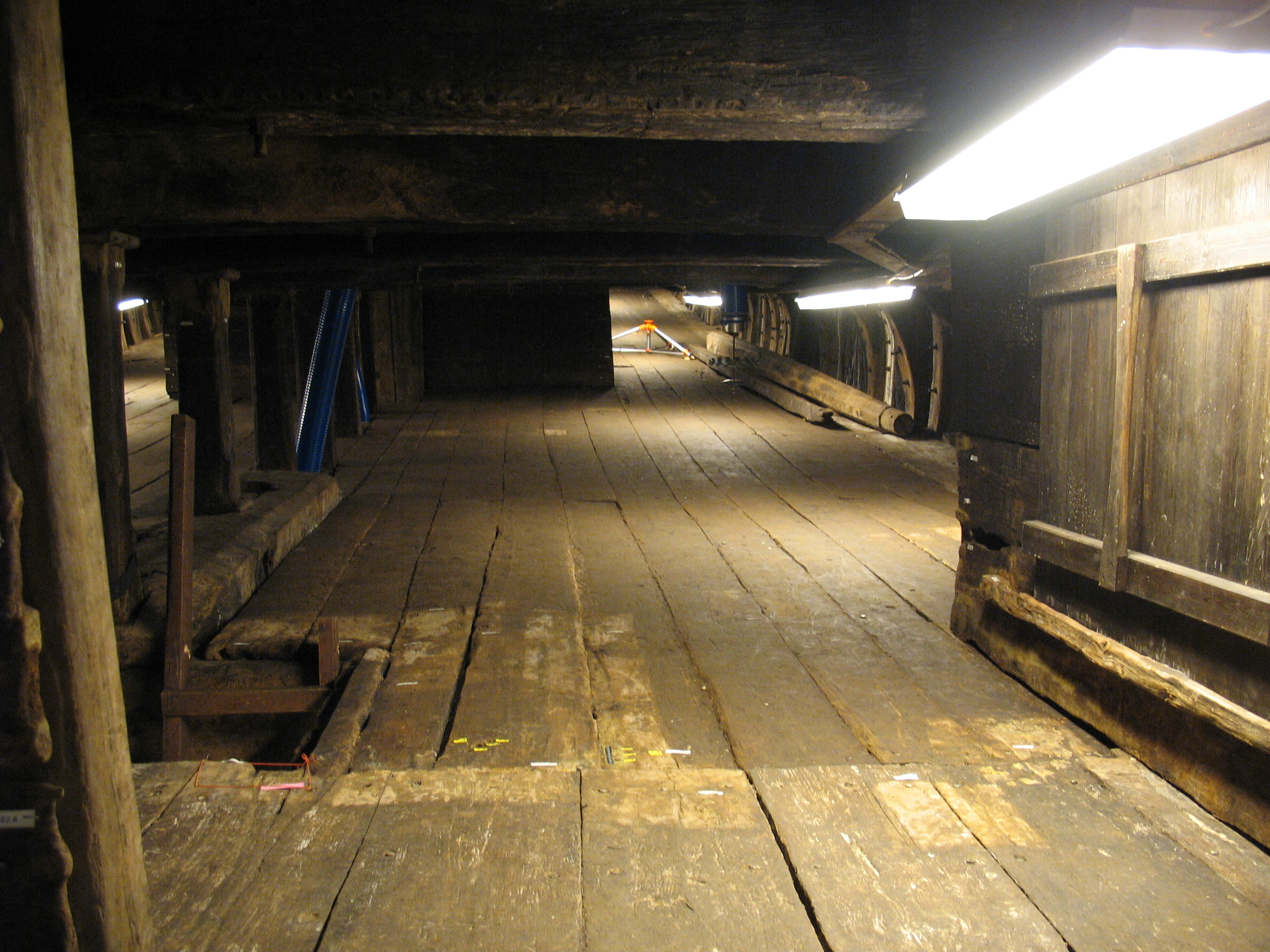
The orlop of the Swedish 17th century warship Vasa looking toward the bow.

The orlop is the lowest deck in a ship (except for very old ships), immediately above the hold. It is often the deck or part of a deck where the cables are stowed, usually below the water line.

== Etymology ==
The word derives from the Dutch overloop from the verb overlopen ("to run over, extend").

== Utilisation ==
The orlop would be used to store various supplies and equipment, such as cordage and blocks utilised around the ship, and it would also house the Warrant officers' workrooms. The brig, used to hold prisoners, would be located near the aft.

During maritime combat, injured sailors would be moved to the orlop deck to be treated in the surgeons' cockpit, located towards the stern. In addition to being out of the way of the gun decks above, being below the water line protected it from enemy cannon fire and minimized the motion of the ship.
