= Charles Stafford =

Charles Stafford may refer to:

- Charles Stafford (anthropologist), professor of anthropology
- Charles Stafford (cricketer), New Zealand cricketer
- Charles A. Stafford, U.S. Army medical officer
- Charles F. Stafford, American lawyer and judge
