= Buda Godman =

American criminal

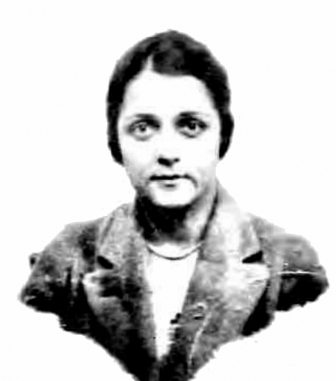
- Born: Helen Julia Godman; December 4, 1888; Chicago
- Died: January 7, 1945 (aged 56); Queens, New York
- Other names: Helen Strong; Alice Williams; Helen Smith; Louise French (1921); Helen Taylor (1907–1910); Mrs. Stoneham; Helen Daniels (1945)
- Spouse: 1907–1910: Tell Taylor
- Parent(s): Otho Godman; Julia Conklin
- Status: 1916: convicted, released on bail, jumped bail, charges eventually dropped 1932: convicted, sentenced to prison in New York
- Accomplices: Jackie French; Charles A. Stoneham

Buda Godman (née Helen Julia Godman; December 4, 1888 – January 7, 1945) was an American criminal, actress, and singer. From 1907 to 1910, she was married to the popular songwriter and music publisher Tell Taylor. Six years after Taylor divorced her, Godman was arrested and released on bail for participating in a scheme to blackmail a wealthy widower. Godman attempted a scheme known as a "badger game," which involved framing a victim in an embarrassing and illegal situation that resulted in a staged arrest by fake law enforcement officials. Godman posed as an unmarried woman being held against her will in a hotel room across state lines, which, if true, would have been a violation of the Mann Act. The ensuing fake arrest went awry when the victim reported the incident to authorities.

In 1932, Godman, under the name of Helen Smith, was convicted for grand larceny and sentenced to prison in New York.

== Early life ==
Buda was the daughter of a telegrapher and race track sheet-writer, Otho Godman. According to Jack Lait and Lee Mortimer, two former Chicago newspaper journalists, to protect her from growing up under bad influences, at age fifteen Buda was sent to St. Joseph’s Academy in Adrian, Michigan, a convent school. Her beauty was described as so fascinating that before maturity she stopped traffic on the streets. She was described as "petite, a wee trifle plump, with big steel-blue eyes, a tip-tilted nose, an oval face with a dimpled chin, a peewee mouth, and tiny hands and feet." As late as 1950 she was remembered as the prettiest girl ever born and raised in Chicago. Other descriptions state that she was "a beautiful woman" (Note: "Six Indicted in Blackmail Ring," Los Angeles Herald, Volume XLII, Number 292, October 6, 1916, p. 8) and "a small brunette... exceeding pretty with plenty of snap." (Note: "Blackmailer is Sentenced," Riverside Daily Press Riverside, California, Volume XXXI, Number 230, September 26, 1916, p. 6)

== Criminal events ==
=== 1916 blackmail scheme ===
In 1916, Godman, under the alias "Alice Williams," persuaded Edward R. West, a wealthy business executive and widower from Hyde Park, Chicago, to travel with her from Chicago to New York City. West was the Vice President of the C. D. Gregg Tea and Coffee Company of St. Louis, Chicago, and New York. While "Miss Williams" and West were in their room at the Ansonia Hotel, two men, impersonating federal law enforcement agents, entered the room and "arrested" West for violation of the Mann Act. (Note: "Two Admit Blackmail – Buda Godman and Man Held in $10,000 Bail," The New York Times, November 9, 1916)

The men transported West and Godman back to Chicago and coerced West into paying them $15,000 to avoid prosecution, embarrassment, and damage to his and Alice's reputation. West reported the incident after becoming suspicious.

Indicted co-conspirators in the scheme were Buda Godman, Helen Evers, Homer T. French, William Butler, Doc Brady (alias James Christian), and George Irwin. Several of the male blackmailers were sentenced to prison. Godman was released on $10,000 bail ($877,000.00 in 2017) provided by two friends: Mrs. Susie Summerville and Mrs. Rene Bernice Morrow, née Martin. Morrow, in 1912, had been acquitted of the charge of murdering her husband. Summerville and Morrow forfeited bail when Godman skipped town and vanished for four years. In 1921, citing lack of evidence, the charges were dropped.

This particular scheme is known as badger gaming—an extortion tactic where an attractive woman lures a wealthy man into a compromising position; an associate breaks in, takes some pictures, then they all sit down to haggle over the price.

=== Chattanooga ===
Buda, under the alias of Louise French, and Jack French were arrested February 2, 1921, in Chattanooga for producing and attempting to pass raised bills, a counterfeiting technique of gluing numerals onto low-denomination bills to make them look like higher denomination bills. (Note: "Confession Claimed On Raising Bills," Atlanta Constitution, February 4, 1921, p. 12 (accessible via www.newspapers.com/clip/78727959))

=== Denver ===
Godman was a paramour of Jackie French (né John Homer French), the bookmaker for Lou Blonger.

=== Havana, Cuba, and New York ===
After the 1916 scandal, up through the mid-1920s, Godman became the protege of Charles A. Stoneham, who, among other things, owned the New York Giants baseball club and, in Havana, Cuba, owned the Cuba-America Jockey Club, the Havana Casino, and the Oriental Park Racetrack. For years, Godman's Park Avenue apartment served as a stage for criminals that included Arnold Rothstein, the gambler; Owney Madden, the Bear King; race track notables, and Broadway climbers. To the other residents of the apartment house, she was known as Mrs. Stoneham; for others, she had other names; and meanwhile the 1916 blackmail charges in Chicago had been dropped.

=== 1932 Glemby jewelry heist ===
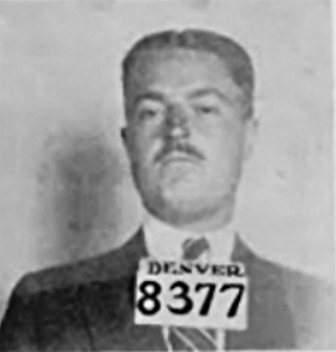
John Homer French at his arrest in 1922

In 1932, Godman, under the alias "Helen Smith," was arrested and charged for an attempt to serve as a fence for $305,000 worth of stolen jewels from New York businessman Harry C. Glemby. (Note: "The Perfect Disguise," by Irving Johnson, The American Weekly (weekly syndicated newspaper magazine), February 22, 1948, p. 12) On November 10, 1932, Godman was convicted for grand larceny and sentenced to prison in New York for four to eight years. (Note: "Girl Sentenced for Taking Gems," Plattsburgh Daily Republican (Plattsburgh, New York), Vol. 122, No. 267, November 11, 1932, p. 1) She began her sentence on November 17, 1932, as prisoner number 1652 at the Auburn Prison and, (Note: "Tabloid News From The Towns: Auburn," Syracuse Journal, November 18, 1932, p. 24, col. 3) with other inmates, was transferred on June 30, 1933, to the Bedford Hills Prison.

== Aliases ==
- Helen Strong
- Alice Williams
- Helen Smith
- Louise French (1921)
- Helen Taylor (she was married to Tell Taylor from 1907 to 1910)
- Mrs. Stoneham (fictitiously married to Charles Abraham Stoneham)
- Helen Daniels, widow of Charles Daniels

== Associates ==
- Dapper Don Collins (pseudonym of Robert Arthur Tourbillon; 1880–1950) (Note: " 'Dapper Don' Is Buried," The New York Times, June 22, 1950) (1916, Chicago) (Note: "The Notorious Buda Godman in Prison at Last," San Antonio Light, January 1, 1933)
- Doc Brady (pseudonym of James Christian) (1916, Chicago), alias W. J. Cross
- John Homer French (1916, Chicago); aliases: Jackie French, Homer T. French, Jack H. French, John Fitch, John Filmore (Note: "Nab Swindlers Wanted Here in $180,000 Frauds: Two Sought by Dade Sheriff Landed in Big Colorado Cleanup," Miami Herald, Vol. 12, No. 275, August 27, 1922, pps. 1 & 7)
- George W. Irwin (1916, Chicago)
- Helen Evers, wife of George Irwin

== Family ==
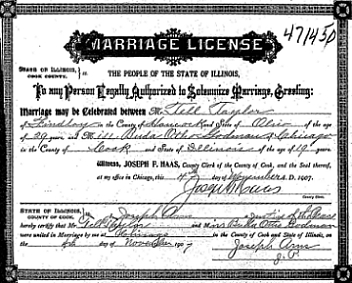
Marriage license of Tell Taylor and Buda Godman, 1907

=== Parents ===
Godman was the daughter of Otho James Godman (1863–1910) and Julia Conklin (1866–1930) of Chicago. (Note: Helen possibly took the name "Buda" from the slang word "bud," used in the late 1800s and early 1900s for a cute girl that had just entered puberty. (Cassell's Dictionary of Slang (2nd ed.), by Jonathon Green, London: Orion Publishing Group (2005) OCLC 769046857) Otho had been a well-known telegraph operator (Note: Obituary: "Otho Godman," Pharos-Tribune (Logansport, Indiana), September 16, 1910, p. 2) and, in 1903, the first to operate a wireless telegraph on August 28, 1903, from a ship on Lake Michigan — the ship being the SS Milwaukee. (Note: "Sends Message From Midlake," Chicago Tribune, August 29, 1903, p. 8, col. 6) Otho was also a horse race-sheet reporter, according to several sources.

=== Siblings ===
Godman had two older siblings: Hester Ann (1886–1923) and James Arthur (1887–1945). Hester accompanied her sister and Charles A. Stoneham on the trip to Cuba and its return. James followed his father in becoming a telegrapher.

=== Marriage ===
From 1907 to 1910, Godman was married to Chicago music publisher and composer Tell Taylor. They married November 4, 1907, in Chicago. Godman had met Taylor about two years prior when Taylor had been a dinner guest at the St. Joseph's Convent and Academy in Adrian, Michigan, where Helen had been attending school. Taylor had just started his songwriting career and was appearing with a traveling stage company in Adrian. Godman and Taylor had become good friends before dinner was over but did not correspond afterward. Two years later, while attending the performance of "The Girl Question," by Howard, Adams, and Hough at the La Salle Theater in Chicago, Godman recognized Taylor and sent a note to him backstage, and they became reacquainted. After spending much of their time together lunching and dining during the following week, they met once again for dinner at a downtown Chicago hotel, and sent for a judge to marry them in the hotel's parlor. (Note: "Weds Actor She Met At Convent," The Philadelphia Inquirer, November 10, 1907, p. 3)

In 1910, Tell filed for divorce from Buda in Chicago. In late September of that year, the divorce was granted. In the proceedings, Tell accused Buda of having "affinities" with other vaudevillians and stated, "I married Buda when we both were drunk and I found out she was quite incapable of loyalty to anyone." (Note: "Queen of the Badger Band," by Elgar Arthur Brown (1897–1958), The American Weekly (weekly syndicated newspaper magazine), September 1, 1946, pp. 16 & 17)

== Death ==
Under the name Helen Daniels, widow of Charles Daniels, Godman died January 7, 1945, in Queens, New York. At the time of her death, she lived at 38-19 50th Street in Sunnyside, Queens. She was buried Sunday, January 7, 1945, at the Sleepy Hollow Cemetery in Sleepy Hollow, New York, her grave-site marked by a simple and unassuming granite headstone.

== Published residences ==
- September 25, 1920: 7437 Merrill Avenue, Chicago

Source: SS Morro Castle Manifest, departing Havana, Cuba September 25, 1920, arriving New York City September 30, 1920, Ellis Island Archives
Charles A. Stoneham is listed on the same SS Morro Castle Manifest

- March 31, 1921: 7437 Merrill Avenue, Chicago

Source: SS Ulua Manifest, departing Havana, Cuba March 31, 1921, arriving New York City April 4, 1921, Ellis Island Archives
Charles A. Stoneham is listed on the same SS Ulua Manifest
Hester Ann Gagen (1886–1923), Buda's sister, is also on the same SS Ulua Manifest

- November 11, 1932: West 54th Street, New York City
- January 1945: 38-19 50th Street in Sunnyside, Queens
