= USAT Thomas H. Barry =

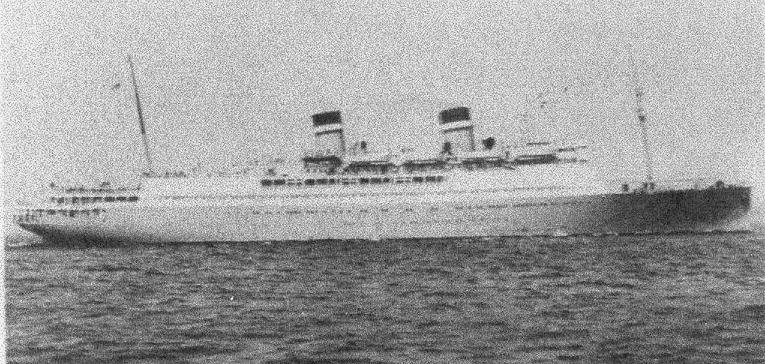
- USAT Thomas H. Barry, formerly SS Oriente, off Norfolk, Va.

History

United States
- Name: SS Oriente (1930–41) USAT Thomas H. Barry (1941–57)
- Namesake: Oriente Province, Cuba US Army General Thomas H. Barry
- Owner: Agwi Navigation Co, Inc
- Operator: Ward Line (1930–41); US Army (1941–50)
- Port of registry: New York
- Builder: Newport News Shipbuilding
- Launched: 15 May 1930
- Completed: 1930
- Acquired: for the US Army: June 1941
- In service: 1930
- Out of service: 1949
- Renamed: Thomas H. Barry, June 1941
- Reclassified: AP-45 (Never effective)
- Homeport: New York
- Identification: official number 230323; Code letters MJFB (until 1933); Call sign KGOX (from 1934)
- Fate: Scrapped 1957

General characteristics
- Type: Ocean liner, then troopship
- Tonnage: 11,520 GRT; 6,449 NRT
- Length: 508 ft (155 m)
- Beam: 70.9 ft (21.6 m)
- Draft: 27 feet 3 inches (8.31 m)
- Depth: 39.0 ft (11.9 m)
- Propulsion: steam turbo-electric transmission, twin screws
- Speed: 18 knots (33 km/h)
- Troops: 3,609
- Complement: 50
- Armament: 2 × 5"/38 caliber guns; 4 × 3"/50 caliber guns; 8 × 0.5 in (12.7 mm) MG
- Notes: sister ship: SS Morro Castle

USAT Thomas H. Barry, formerly SS Oriente, was a Ward Line ocean liner that became a United States Army troopship in the Second World War. She was intended for transfer to the United States Navy and assigned the hull number AP-45, but was not transferred and remained with the Army.

== History ==
=== Building and civilian service ===
Newport News Shipbuilding and Drydock Company built Oriente for Ward Line as a sister ship to SS Morro Castle. Oriente was completed in 1930, two months after Morro Castle. Each ship was 508 feet (155 metres) long, measured 11,520 gross register tons (GRT) and had turbo-electric transmission, with General Electric twin turbo generators supplying current to propulsion motors on twin propeller shafts. The two liners carried passengers between New York and Havana, Cuba.

In 1934 a fire destroyed Morro Castle, killing 135 people. Oriente remained in Ward Line service until 1941.

=== Army service ===
Oriente was among the ships designated for Army among the 28 merchant vessels (21 for the Navy and seven to the Army) requisitioned by the Maritime Commission's Division of Emergency Shipping announced on 4 June 1941. The ship was purchased and delivered to the US War Department on 14 June 1941 and renamed USAT Thomas H. Barry designated as a troopship. The ship was one of the relatively few transports owned, rather than bareboat chartered, by the Army.

Thomas H. Barry was one of seven transports hurriedly assembled in New York and sailing late on 22 January 1942 (23 January GMT) in what was then the largest troop movement attempted, movement Poppy Force, also designated Task Force 6814, under General Alexander Patch to secure New Caledonia (codename Poppy) on the vital South Pacific link to Australia. The seven ships had a troop capacity of almost 22,000. Task Force 6814 was later organized in New Caledonia as the Americal Division.

On 29 September 1941 the acting chief of naval operations, Rear Admiral Royal E. Ingersoll, sent a memorandum to the chief of the Bureau of Navigation, listing a number of Army transports, including Thomas H. Barry, that were to be "eventually taken over by the Navy." Prewar plans had called for the transfer; however, the Army retained the right to obtain additional shipping if required. Delays in Navy manning and conversion and the demands of actual wartime conditions made the mass transfer unfeasible with the Navy concentrating on ships for combat loading and the "attack" transports, and the Army concentrating on convoy loading. Thomas H. Barry was later given the Navy designation AP-45 but was never taken over by the Navy and remained under Army control through the end of World War II.

Barry was one of three transports, the others being USS Munargo and USS Siboney, sailing from the New York Port of Embarkation for the United Kingdom on 31 May 1942 implementing "double bunking," whereby two men were assigned one bunk in order to increase capacity up to the maximum allowed by lifesaving equipment and other safety rules.

On the morning of 21 October 1945 at approximately 40.41º north, 67.18º west, about 150 miles (241 km) east of New Bedford, Massachusetts, in heavy fog Barry rammed and cut in two the 233-ton fishing trawler Medford, with one person on the trawler killed, six missing, and ten survivors picked up by Barry. The transport, destined for Le Havre, France, with over 3,000 passengers comprising Red Cross workers, civilians, and occupation troops, returned to New York with a damaged bow for dry-docking. The trawler had recently been one of those acquired by the Navy for offshore antisubmarine patrol and returned to be purchased by a New Bedford company.

=== Laidup and disposal ===
In the mass transfer of Army ships to the Navy, Thomas H. Barry was declared surplus to Navy needs; title was transferred to the Maritime Commission on 12 December 1949 with the ship laid up in the National Defense Reserve Fleet on the James River, Virginia, on 24 January 1950. She remained there until 4 November 1957, when removed by the Bethlehem Shipbuilding Corporation, which had purchased the ship for $276,780 for scrap on 21 October.
