= Ward Line =

American shipping company

New York and Cuba Mail Steamship Company (Ward Line)
- House flag
- Type: Partnership
- Industry: Shipping, transportation
- Founded: 1841 in New York, United States
- Defunct: 1954
- Fate: Liquidated
- Successor: Ward-García Line
- Area served: Transatlantic

The New York and Cuba Mail Steamship Company, commonly called the Ward Line, was a shipping company that operated from 1841 until liquidated in 1954. The line operated out of New York City's Piers 15, 16, and 17—land which later became the site of the South Street Seaport and also the Manhattan terminal of the IKEA-Red Hook ferry route. The company’s steamers linked New York City with Nassau, Havana, and Mexican Gulf ports. The company had a good reputation for safety until a series of disasters in the mid-1930s, including the SS Morro Castle disaster. Soon after, the company changed its name to the Cuba Mail Line. In 1947, the Ward Line name was restored when service was resumed after World War II, but rising fuel prices and competition from airlines caused the company to cease operation in 1954.

== History ==
The Ward Line evolved from the freight consignment company established by James Otis Ward in New York in 1841. After Ward's death in 1856, his son James Edward Ward took over and expanded the company, eventually incorporating under the name New York and Cuba Mail Steamship Company in 1881. In 1888 the company bought out its main competitor on the Cubans routes, the Alexandre Line, in the process acquiring all of Alexandre's ships, property, and its Mexican freight contracts and subsidies.

Upon James Edward Ward's death in 1894, control of the company passed to Henry Prosper Booth. In 1897, the Ward steamer Valencia was purposely attacked by the Spanish cruiser Reina Mercedes off Guantánamo Bay, which fired two shots at the steamer. The Valencia was chartered from the Red D Line to serve a route from New York City to Nassau, Bahamas while visiting small Cuban ports along the way. It was later reported the Reina Mercedes was well aware of Valencia's identity and had fired the shots so as to intimidate the smaller steamer to raise her colors. In 1898 all of the Ward Line ships were requisitioned for United States military use during the Spanish–American War. Increased demand for passenger and freight service helped the line modernize its fleet and become a leader in the coastal trade.

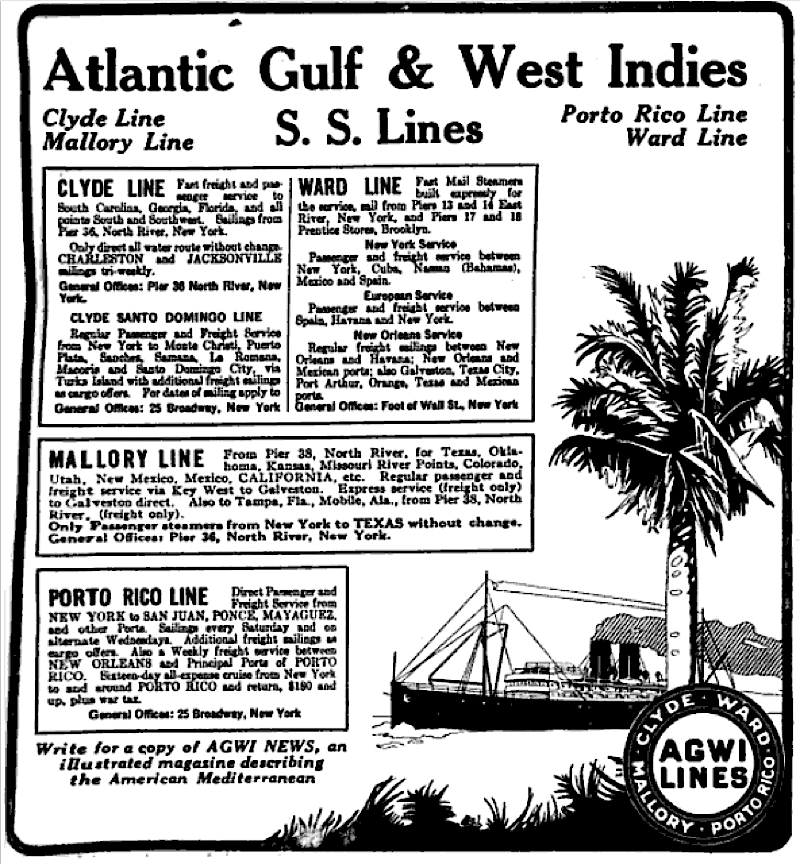
Atlantic, Gulf & West Indies Steamship Lines (AGWI) advertisement 1921 showing four component lines.

In 1907 Consolidated Steamship Lines, a shipping conglomerate of Charles W. Morse, bought the Ward Line for a large sum. When that company went bankrupt the following year, the former subsidiaries of Consolidated, including the Ward Line, joined forces to form the Atlantic, Gulf & West Indies Lines (Agwilines) holding company. Common resources were pooled, but each company maintained its own management.

During World War I, two of its newest liners, SS Havana and SS Saratoga, and two new liners under construction, SS Siboney and SS Orizaba, were requisitioned for government use. Saratoga and Havana became United States Navy hospital ships Comfort and Mercy, respectively; Siboney and Orizaba became troop transports under their original names. All but Saratoga/Mercy eventually returned to the line after the war.

In the 1920s, service reductions, poor management, and rehabilitation of its aging fleet nearly bankrupted the company, but subsidies from the United States government helped to resuscitate the company. In 1929 government financing help the Ward Line build two new luxury liners, SS Morro Castle and SS Oriente. With two of the newest liners in the Merchant Marine and relatively low fares, the company was able to weather the early years of the Great Depression relatively well.

In 1934, the Ward Line's reputation for safety at sea suffered a major setback. On September 8, 1934, Morro Castle caught fire killing 137, a tally that is still the highest death toll of any U.S.-flagged merchant ship. In the months that followed the company suffered a series of further public relations disasters. Havana ran aground near the Bahamas in January 1935, and SS Mohawk a ship chartered by the Ward Line to replace Havana, sank on its initial voyage the same month. The Ward Line name was dropped in favor of Cuba Mail Line to help put these disasters behind the company, but it never truly recovered.

In 1942 all of the company's remaining passenger liners were requisitioned by the government for use during World War II, none of which were returned to the company. In 1947, Agwilines resurrected the Ward Line name for limited passenger service on converted World War II freighters. This reduced service lasted until 1954, when Agwilines was liquidated as a result of rising fuel prices and competition from airlines.

=== Later incarnations ===
In 1955, the Ward Line name was purchased by Thomas Stevenson who operated foreign-flagged freighters under the Stevenson Lines name, but as Stevenson's company diversified, it moved away from the shipping industry. In 1955, Companñía Naviera García, a Cuban steamship company, bought the Ward name and ran its company under the name Ward-García Line. Ward-García lasted only until 1959 when declining demand and the Cuban Revolution ended its service.

== List of ships ==
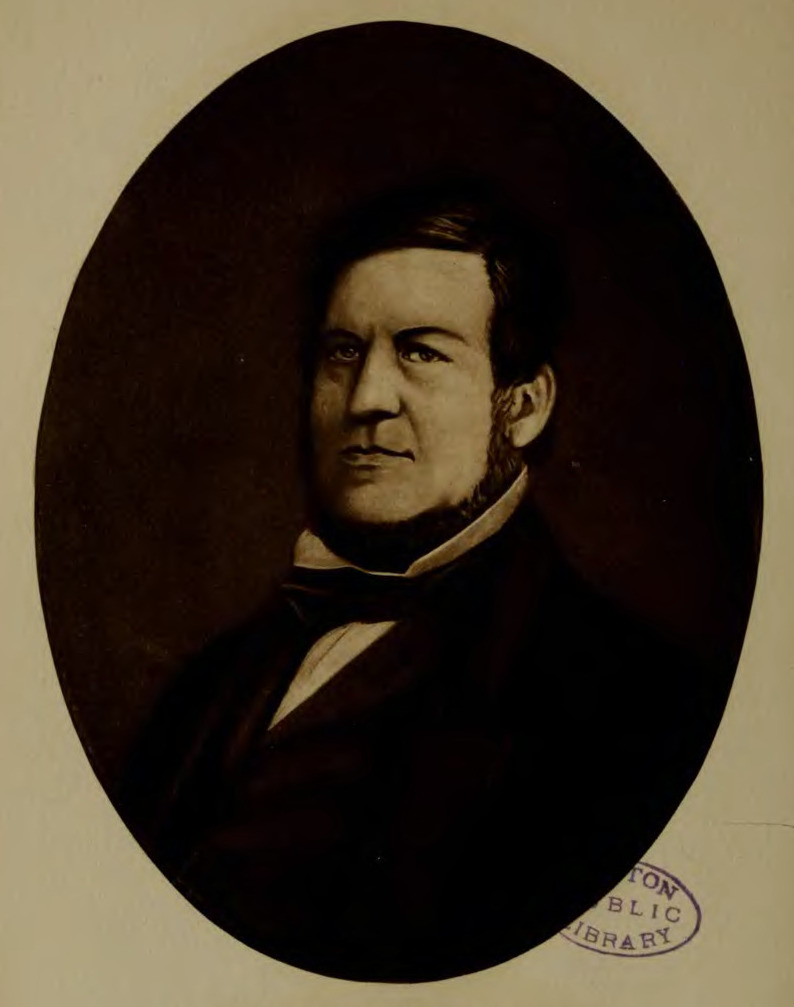
James Otis Ward

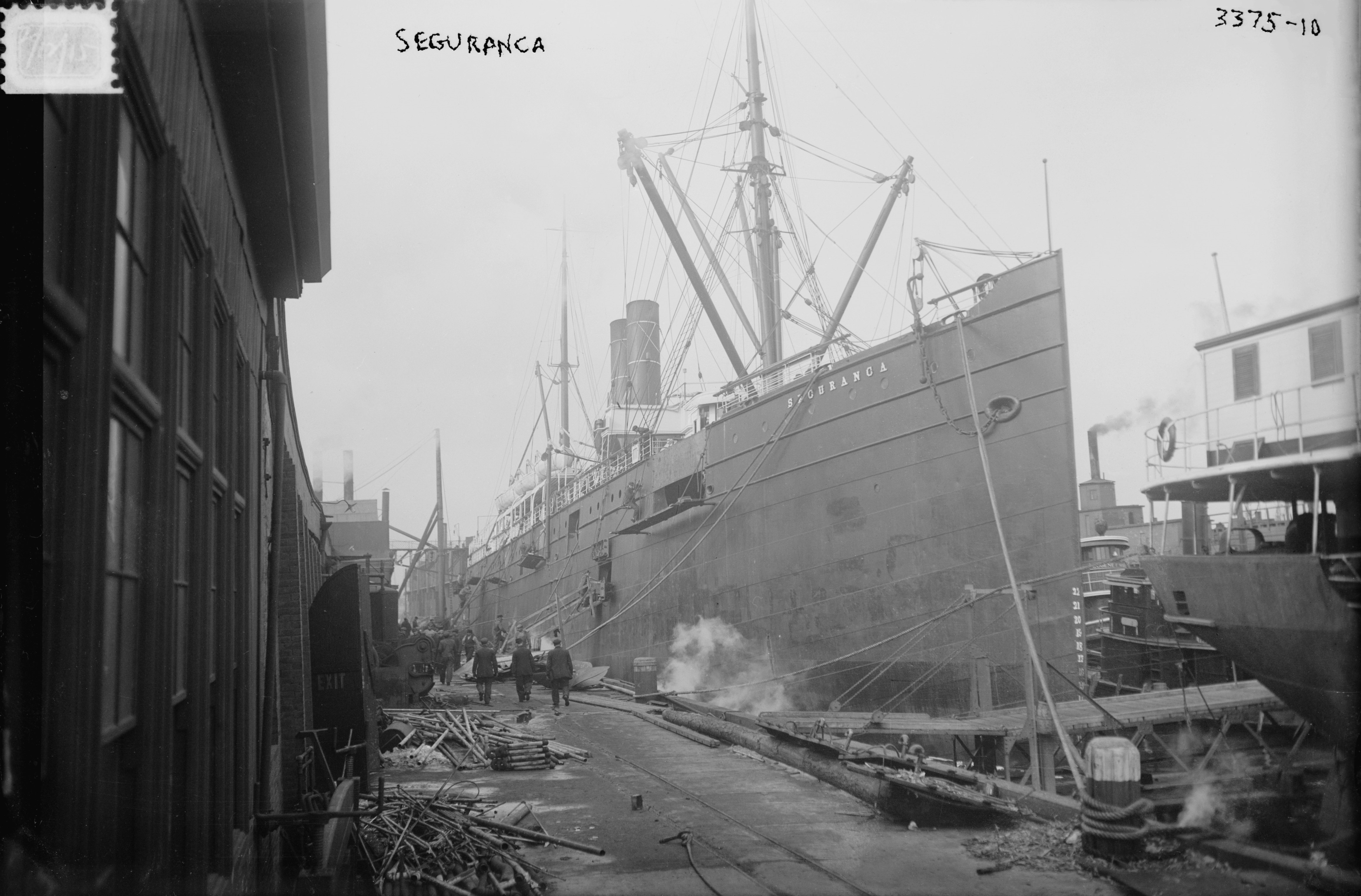
Seguranca, about 1914

Passenger steamships of the Ward Line:

- SS City of Washington (1877)
- SS Niagara (1877)
- SS Saratoga (1877)
- SS City of Alexandria (1879)
- SS Santiago (1879)
- SS Saratoga (1879)
- SS Newport (1880)
- SS Cinfuegos (1883)
- SS Seneca (1884)
- SS Orizaba (1889)
- SS Seguranca (1889)
- SS Yumuri (1889)
- SS Vigilancia (1890)
- SS Yucatan (1890)
- SS Valencia (1897) – Chartered from the Red D Line.
- SS Havana (1898)
- SS Mexico (1898)
- SS Morro Castle (1900)
- SS Esperanza (1901)
- SS Monterey (1901)
- SS Yucatan (1903)
- SS Havana (1906)
- SS Merida (1906)
- SS Mexico (1906)
- SS Saratoga (1907)
- SS Orizaba (1917)
- SS Siboney (1918)
- SS Morro Castle (1930)
- SS Oriente (1930)
- SS Mexico (1933)
- SS Monterey (1933)
- SS Agwiprince (1941)
