= SS Orizaba =

At least six steamships have been called Orizaba:

- SS Orizaba – a New York-built wooden side-wheeled steamer, launched on January 14, 1854 and broken up in 1887.
- RMS Orizaba – a 6,077 GRT UK ocean liner launched in 1886 and wrecked in 1905
- SS Orizaba – a 2,334 GRT New York and Cuba Mail Steamship Company (aka Ward Line) vessel launched in 1889
- SS Orizaba (1908) – a 233 GRT UK trawler launched in 1908 and still in existence in the 1940s
- SS Orizaba (1939) – a 4,354 GRT turbo-electric German cargo ship launched in 1939 and wrecked in 1940
- USS Orizaba (ID-1536) – a 6,937 GRT US ocean liner launched in 1917 and scrapped in 1963 that served as a troop ship
