= Tell Taylor =

American songwriter, performer, playwright, and music publisher (1876–1937)

Tell Taylor (aka Tellie né Tell Roberts (October 28, 1876 – November 23, 1937) was an American songwriter and playwright. Tell was born October 28, 1876 to Clarinda Jane Roberts (1854-1930) and John Asbury Taylor (1853-1928), on a farm near the Village of Vanlue, Amanda Township, Hancock County, Ohio. He was an American traveling vaudeville performer, tenor vocalist, playwright, music publisher, composer, and lyricist who had written over 200 popular songs. His biggest hit was "Down by the Old Mill Stream" from 1910, one of the most commercially successful Tin Pan Alley publications of the era. The song was published by Tell Taylor, Inc., which he had co-founded in 1907. Taylor performed vaudeville theaters and founded a Chicago music publishing house bearing his name. His other notable songs include "He Sleeps Beneath the Soil of France," "I Love You Best of All," "If Dreams Come True," "Little Old Home in the Valley," "Rock Me to Sleep in the Old Rocking Chair," "Some Day," and "When the Maple Leaves Were Falling." Taylor also wrote the Broadway comedies Tiger Lillee and In New York Town.

== Career highlights ==
Theater

By 1892, at the age of 16, Taylor's name as a thespian began to be published in theater reviews of newspapers in and around New York, Wisconsin, Illinois, Ohio, Indiana, Iowa, and Missouri. Among the plays of that year featuring Taylor was By Wits Outwitted, written by Edward Owings Towne, where Taylor played the audacious hero (Valentine Navaro), and Florence Modena playing the pretty heroine (Fernanda). Taylor also played the part of Bill Smith, a farm hand, in A Glimpse of Paradise, by Frank S. Pixley, a one-act play that often preceded the three-act By Wits Outwitted.

Music publishing and songwriting

Before launching his Chicago publishing firm in 1907, Taylor had co-founded one of the original Tin Pan Alley publishing houses in New York City with fellow composer, Ernest R. Ball, and former New York City Mayor who then was a state senator, James J. Walker. In 1918, Earl Kelly Smith (1886–1954), who had been affiliated with Taylor's Chicago publishing house since 1908, opened a branch in New York City. In Chicago, Taylor composed songs and ran his own sheet music publishing firm from 1907 to 1922.

Post publishing & singing

In 1922, Taylor sold his Chicago publishing firm and purchased a farm for his parents near his boyhood home, on the outskirts of Findlay, Ohio, and spent the rest of his life there. In May, he formally assigned his catalog to Forster Music Publishers, Inc,. 216 South Wabash Ave., Chicago, However, "Down By The Old Mill Stream," his top selling composition, was not assigned until 1931.

Death

In the Autumn of 1937, prior to embarking on a trip to California to discuss a motion picture about his life, Taylor entered a Chicago bar and ordered a drink. Tell sat at a table, put his head down to rest and died from a heart attack at the age of 61 on November 23, 1937, in Chicago. He was buried in Van Horn Cemetery, Findlay, Ohio.

Posthumous lawsuit over song

In 1937, when the original copyright for "Down By The Old Mill Stream" was expiring, Earl Kelly Smith (1886–1954) filed an application to renew the copyright as co-composer. The renewal was granted. Jerry Vogel Music Company began publishing it. Forster Music, which had acquired the rights to the song from the heirs of Tell Taylor, filed suit to stop Vogel from publishing the song. In 1944, a US District Court in New York ruled in favor of Forster.

== Selected works ==
=== Popular songs ===
G.W. Setchell Publisher (George William Setchell; 1860–1923), Boston

- "Tommy: Tell Me True," lyrics by Taylor, music by Don Ramsay (né Donald Howard Lee Ramsay; 1877– ) (©1904) OCLC 18853408

Forster Music Publisher, Inc., Chicago

- "Down by the Old Mill Stream" assigned (©1931) OCLC 36009589, 498329355
- "On The Banks of the Old Mill Stream," lyrics & music by Taylor (©1937) OCLC 502264132

Tell Taylor, Chicago

- "Someday," lyrics & music by Taylor (©1908) OCLC 46819987
- "If Dreams Are True," lyrics & music by Taylor (©1909)
- "Flowers of Love," lyrics by Taylor, music by Earl Kelly Smith (1886–1954) (©1909) OCLC 367943569
- "Down by the Old Mill Stream" (©August 12, 1910), OCLC 426144037
- "When We Were Sweethearts," lyrics & music by Taylor (©1911) OCLC 27094209
- "Fare-Thee-Well," lyrics by Taylor, music by George Fairman (né George Wayne Fairman; 1881–1962) (©1911) OCLC 726906429, 444497331
- "The Roses of Erin," lyrics by Taylor & C. F. McNamara, music by Earl Kelly Smith (1886–1954) (©1911) OCLC 499139181

Copyright renewed 1939 by Earl Kelly Smith (1886–1954), Hollywood, California

- "Buckwheat Cakes," lyrics by Taylor, music by Fred Sloop, Jr. (1883–1966) (©1911) OCLC 433545183

Copyright renewed 1939 by Fred Sloop, Jr. (1883–1966), Steubenville, Ohio

- "Forty Years Ago," lyrics by Dave Nowlin (pseudonym of Dave N. Robinson), music by Taylor (©1911) OCLC 498539329

Copyright renewed 1939 by Dave N. Robinson, Austin, Texas

- "When the Maple Leaves Were Falling," lyrics & music by Taylor (©1913) OCLC 33308961

Copyright renewed 1941 by Jesse Thornton Taylor, Jr. (1890–1956) Findlay, Ohio

- "She Sold her Soul For the Sake of Gold," lyrics & music by Taylor (©1914) OCLC 497116217, 497116217
- "Don't Cry Little Girl, Don't Cry," lyrics & music by Taylor (©1914) OCLC 57298046
- "I Love You Best of All," lyrics & music by Taylor (©1915) OCLC 30857351
- "He Sleeps Beneath the Soil of France," lyrics & music by Taylor (©1917) OCLC 61356619
- "When It's Rose Time In Old Virginia" ("I'll Be Coming Down Your Way"), lyrics & music by Taylor & Ray W. Fay (©1917) OCLC 34201002
- "Tell Me Again You Love Me," lyrics & music by Taylor (©1917) OCLC 497116301
- "We're In The Army Now," lyrics by Taylor & Ole Olsen, music by Isham Jones (©1917) OCLC 72437358
- "When The Autumn Leaves Are Turning Gold," lyrics & music by Taylor (©1917) OCLC 456264795
- "Down in Hindu Town," lyrics by Taylor, music by Fred Rose (©1919) OCLC 10217172
- "I'm Going To Write You A Letter," lyrics & music by Taylor (©1919) OCLC 25255123
- "Bless Your Little Heart," lyrics by Taylor, music by Isham Jones (©1919) OCLC 459711512
- "On the Alamo," lyrics by Gilbert Keyes (aka Gus Kahn) and Joe Lyons, music by Isham Jones (©March 17, 1922), assigned on August 2, 1922 to Forster Music Publisher, Inc.
- "Rock Me To Sleep in an Old Rocking Chair" (©1926) OCLC 46931548
- "Little Old Home in the Valley," lyrics & music by Taylor & Al Bishop (pub. date unknown) OCLC 498173381
- "When the Southern Moon is Swinging Low," lyrics & music by Taylor and Fay (©1916) OCLC 22939671

Taylor Music Corp., Chicago

- "When The Sun Goes Down in Rainbow Land," lyrics by Taylor, music by Fred Rose. Arrangement by Harry L. Alford. (©1919) OCLC 11288429

=== Musical theater (vaudeville) ===
- Tiger Lillies
- In New York Town (1905)

== Marriages ==
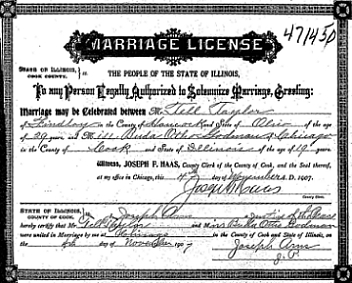
Tell Taylor's Marriage License — 1907. Note that Buda Godman did not use her legal name Helen Julia Godman.

On November 4, 1907, Taylor married Buda Godman (née Helen Julia Godman; 1888–1945 ), the daughter of Otho and Julia Godman (née Conklin) of Chicago. Buda had met Taylor about two years prior when Taylor had been a dinner guest at the St. Joseph's Convent and Academy in Adrian, Michigan, where Helen had been attending school. Taylor had just started his songwriting career and was appearing with a traveling stage company in Adrian. Buda and Tell had become friends before dinner was over, but did not correspond afterward. Two years later, while attending the performance of "The Girl Question," by Howard, Adams, and Hough, at a theater in Chicago, Buda recognized Tell and sent a note to him backstage, and they became reacquainted. After spending time together lunching and dining during the following week, they met for dinner at a Chicago hotel, and sent for a judge to marry them in the hotel's parlor.

In 1910, Tell Taylor filed for divorce from Buda in Chicago. In late September of that year, the divorce was granted, with Tell accusing Buda of having "affinities" with other vaudevillains. In the divorce proceedings, Tell stated that "I married Buda when we both were drunk and I found out she was quite incapable of loyalty to anyone."

On July 8, 1913, Tell Taylor married again to Blanche Irene King (maiden; born 1887) in McLean County, Illinois. In 1921, Blanch filed for, and was granted a divorce from Tell Taylor in Chicago.

== Selected performances ==
As cast member

- Quincy Adams Sawyer, by Justin Adams and Charles Felton Pidgin
1. Academy of Music, New York

Opening night: August 7, 1902
Staged by John Stapleton

- The Girl Question, by Joseph E. Howard, Frank R. Adams, and Will Hough
1. Milwaukee
2. La Salle Theater, Chicago

Opening night: August 17, 1907
Mort H. Singer (né Mortimer Henry Singer; 1876–1944), theater manager
