= USS Siboney (ID-2999) =

United States Navy troop transport

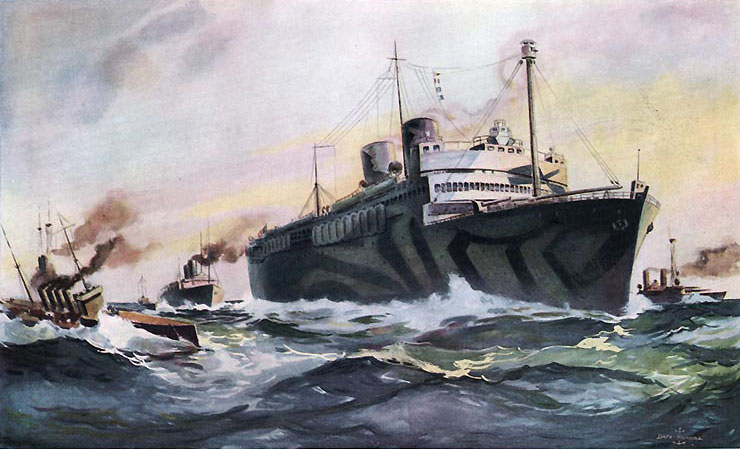
- "Periscope" view of the Siboney in convoy, by Musician Loren C. Holmberg, USN (c. 1919), shows the dazzle camouflage applied to the ship during World War I.

History

United States
- Name: Siboney
- Namesake: Siboney, Cuba
- Builder: William Cramp & Sons
- Yard number: 434
- Launched: as SS Oriente, 15 August 1917
- Renamed: Siboney, 28 February 1918
- Acquired: 8 April 1918
- Commissioned: 8 April 1918
- Decommissioned: 10 September 1919
- Maiden voyage: 23 April 1918
- Identification: Hull symbol: ID-2999; Official number: 216082
- Fate: Returned to Ward Line

United States
- Name: Siboney
- Owner: Ward Line (New York & Cuba Mail Steamship Co.)
- Route: New York City–Havana–Spain, 1920–1921; New York City–Cuba–Mexico, 1921–1940
- Acquired: August 1919
- In service: 1919
- Refit: 1924
- Out of service: 1940
- Fate: Chartered by American Export Lines

United States
- Operator: American Export Lines
- Route: Jersey City–Lisbon, 1940–1941
- Acquired: 1940
- In service: 1940
- Out of service: 28 May 1941
- Fate: chartered by U.S. Army

United States
- Name: Siboney
- In service: May 1941
- Renamed: Charles A. Stafford, January 1944
- Identification: USAT (United States Army Transport)
- Namesake: Captain Charles A. Stafford, U.S. Army Medical Corps
- Reclassified: hospital ship, January 1944
- Refit: January–September 1944
- Identification: USAHS (United States Army Hospital Ship)
- Out of service: February 1948
- Home port: Charleston, South Carolina, Sept 1944 – Aug 1945; Los Angeles, Aug 1945 – Feb 1946; New York City, Feb 1946 – Feb 1948
- Fate: Scrapped, 1957

General characteristics
- Displacement: 11,298 long tons (11,479 t)
- Length: 443 ft 3 in (135.10 m)
- Beam: 60 ft (18.3 m)
- Draft: 24 ft 6 in (7.47 m)
- Installed power: 8 × single ended boilers
- Propulsion: 2 × 4,500 shp (3,400 kW) Parsons steam turbines; 2 × screws
- Speed: 17.5 knots (32.4 km/h; 20.1 mph)
- Troops: 3,100; 3,900 after Armistice
- Complement: 346
- Armament: 4 × 5 in (130 mm)/51 caliber guns; 2 × 1-pounders; 2 × machine guns

Differences as SS Siboney:
- Crew: 127

Differences as USAT Siboney:
- Tonnage: 6,937 long tons (7,048 t)
- Speed: 16 knots (30 km/h; 18 mph)
- Range: 6,000 nmi (11,000 km; 6,900 mi)
- Capacity: cargo: 116,000 cu ft (3,300 m^{3})
- Troops: 1,201

Differences as USAHS Charles A. Stafford:
- Tonnage: 7,587 long tons (7,709 t)
- Range: 8,000 nmi (15,000 km; 9,200 mi)
- Capacity: patients: 704; cargo: none
- Armament: None

USS Siboney (ID-2999) was a troopship of the United States Navy in World War I. She was the sister ship of USS Orizaba (ID-1536). Launched as SS Oriente, she was soon renamed after Siboney, Cuba, a landing site of United States forces during the Spanish–American War. After her navy service ended, she was SS Siboney for the New York & Cuba Mail Steamship Co. (commonly called the Ward Line). (Note: While Commonly called Ward Line all official documents such as registers and many references, including DANFS and Roland Charles' Troopships of World War II, use the owner's name: New York & Cuba Mail Steamship Company.) The ship was operated under charter by American Export Lines beginning in late 1940. During World War II she served the US Army as transport USAT Siboney and as the hospital ship USAHS Charles A. Stafford.

As a transport during World War I, Siboney made 17 transatlantic voyages for the navy carrying troops to and from Europe, and had the shortest average in-port turnaround time of all navy transports. During her maiden voyage, her steering gear malfunctioned which resulted in a collision between two other troopships in the convoy.

After her World War I service ended, Siboney was returned to the Ward Line and placed in New York City–Cuba–Spain transatlantic service; the liner ran aground at Vigo, Spain, in September 1920. Despite considerable damage, she was repaired and placed back in service. In late 1921, Siboney was switched to New York City–Cuba–Mexico routes, which were a popular and inexpensive way for Americans to escape Prohibition. In late 1940, she was chartered to American Export Lines to return Americans fleeing Europe at the outset of World War II, making seven roundtrips from Jersey City, New Jersey, to Lisbon.

During World War II, Siboney was requisitioned by the War Shipping Administration (WSA) and assigned to the War Department as a US Army transport. She made several transatlantic trips and called at ports in Africa, the Middle East, Canada, the Caribbean, and the United Kingdom. During a 1944 overhaul, the ship was selected for conversion to a hospital ship. Renamed USAHS Charles A. Stafford after a US Army doctor killed in action in Australia, the ship served in both the European and the Pacific Theatres. After the end of her army service, the ship was laid up in the National Defense Reserve Fleet in February 1948, and sold for scrapping in 1957.

== World War I naval service ==
Oriente was a combination cargo and passenger ship built by William Cramp & Sons, Philadelphia, for the Ward Line. In mid-1917, the United States Shipping Board (USSB) commandeered and received title to all private shipbuilding projects in progress, including the still-incomplete Oriente and her sister ship Orizaba. Plans for both ships were modified for troop carrying duties. Oriente was launched on 15 August 1917, renamed Siboney on 28 February 1918, delivered to the navy on 8 April, and commissioned the same day.

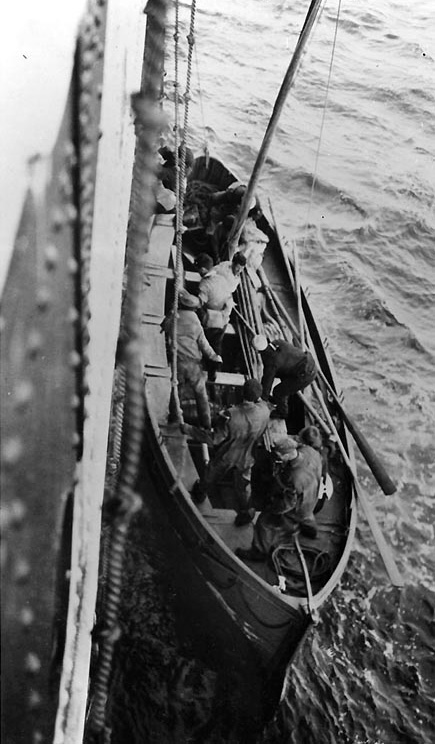
The first of two lifeboats from the torpedoed British troopship Dwinsk to be rescued by Siboney on 21 June 1918

Siboney sailed from Philadelphia, on 16 April, as a unit of the Cruiser and Transport Force, and arrived at Newport News, two days later to embark her first contingent of troops. She departed Hampton Roads, on 23 April, and joined her first convoy the following day. On 25 April, her rudder jammed; and, in the ensuing confusion, transports Aeolus and Huron collided and had to return to New York City. On 4 May, the convoy was joined by the war zone escort of eight destroyers, and on 6 May, Siboney arrived at Brest. Debarking her troops, she sailed the following day and arrived at Hoboken, New Jersey, on 15 May.

Siboney embarked her second contingent of troops at Lambert's Point, Virginia, on 25 May and sailed the following day. The New York section of the convoy joined two days later and the ships entered the war zone on 6 June. In French waters, they were met by Corsair, a squadron of minesweepers, an American dirigible, and two French hydroplanes. Siboney arrived in Bordeaux, on 8 June, and departed the following day but remained anchored in the mouth of the Gironde, until 13 June, awaiting the tanker Woonsocket. On 15 June, the convoy passed six empty lifeboats from the torpedoed transport President Lincoln. Siboney entered the American war zone on 20 June, and the next day rescued survivors of the British troopship, Dwinsk, which had been torpedoed three days earlier. The transport arrived at New York City on 22 June and anchored in the North River.

Siboney sailed for France, on 30 June; after delivering her troops at Brest, on 12 July, she returned to New York, on 25 July. She sailed again on 31 July. Before arriving at Brest, on 12 August, she had to maneuver several times to evade possible submarine contacts. She arrived at New York, on 22 August and was given a two-week repair period.

On 4 September, Siboney sailed from New York on her fifth crossing and arrived at Saint-Nazaire, nine days later. On 15 September, she embarked a number of wounded troops and left Saint-Nazaire, the same day, but due to heavy submarine activity, swung at anchor for several days before her convoy sailed. She arrived on 29 September, at New York. On her sixth eastward crossing, between 6 and 15 October, an influenza epidemic broke out among the troops, killing a number of soldiers. Sailing from Brest, on 16 October, the transport returned to New York on 24 October.

Siboney had already embarked troops for her next voyage when, on 3 November, she was ordered to disembark them. She sailed the following day with an army brigadier general and his staff, and a naval draft of 500 men. She arrived at Saint-Nazaire, on the 12 November, shortly after the announcement of the Armistice, and was met by a cheering crowd.

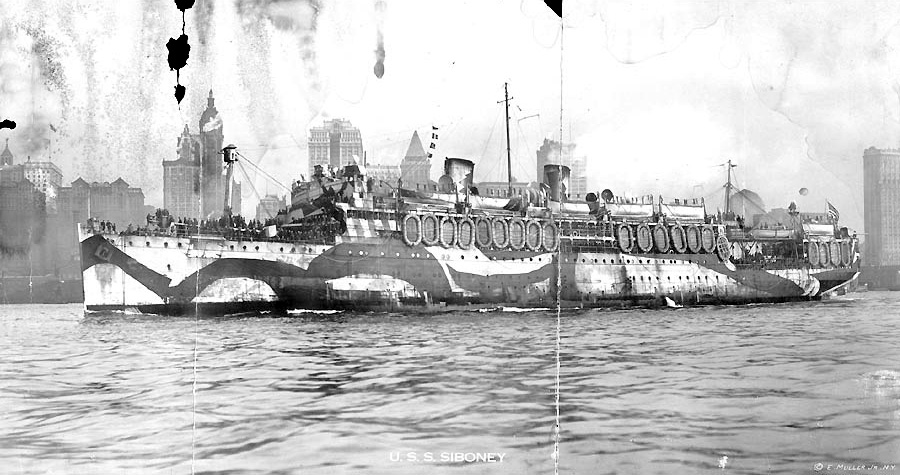
Siboney arrives in New York Harbor in late 1918 or 1919 with returning soldiers crowding the rails.

Siboney then began her peacetime mission of returning American veterans from Europe to the United States. After embarking 513 wounded men at Saint-Nazaire, she moved to Brest, on 15 November, and took on 600 more passengers. She sailed the same day under escort and reached New York, on 24 November. During the next ten months, Siboney made ten more round trips between the United States and France, returning over 3,000 troops per trip when fully loaded. On one such return trip in August 1919, Siboney carried Admiral Henry T. Mayo, and Congressman Thomas S. Butler, home from France.

Siboney returned to New York, on 2 September, at the conclusion of her 17th trip, having traveled over 115,000 nautical miles (213,000 km) and transported approximately 55,000 military passengers to and from French ports. According to the Statistical Department of the US Navy, Siboney had the shortest average in-port turnaround time out of 37 US Navy transports used during World War I. The ship completed 17 round trips and had an average turn-around time of just under 30 days per trip, almost ten days shorter than the average of 39.8 days.

On 10 September, at Hoboken, Siboney was decommissioned and turned over to the War Department, who returned the ship to the Ward Line, her original owners.

== Interwar civilian service ==
After her reacquisition, the Ward Line placed SS Siboney in transatlantic service on a New York to Havana, Tenerife, Bilbao, Santander, and Vigo route. On 9 September 1920, the ship ran aground in the harbor at Vigo. Initial efforts to re-float her were unsuccessful, but by late October, Siboney had been repaired enough to make it to Shields. Despite considerable damage, Siboney was refitted and placed in service again and, by March 1921, the Ward Line was advertising passage to Spain via Havana aboard her. The Ward Line, however, abandoned the New York–Cuba–Spain service later in 1921 due to a lack of passengers.

By November 1921, Siboney was placed in New York City–Cuba–Mexico service, where business thrived, in part because of Prohibition in the United States. Ward Line cruises to Havana were one of the quickest and least expensive ways to what one author called "alcohol-enriched vacations". A typical route from this period would sail from New York City and call at Nassau, Havana, Progreso, Veracruz, and Tampico, skipping Nassau on the return. Prohibition also had a more direct effect on Siboney and her crew. On 27 June 1922, Siboney—freshly returned from Havana with a load of pineapples—was raided by United States Customs Service inspectors who seized 300 bottles of smuggled liquor on board. In December 1923, four boiler room workers were arrested when police became suspicious of a man who had apparently just delivered a supply of alcohol to the docked ship.

Siboney underwent a major refit in 1924 during which time she was replaced on her routes by SS Yucatán, formerly the North German Lloyd ship Prinz Waldemar. After returning to service for the Ward Line, Siboney was the first to relay messages from Miami about the severity of the Great Miami Hurricane when she passed there shortly after the storm hit in September 1926.

On 18 February 1928, Siboney rammed and sank the coal barge Seneca off Ambrose Light during a snowstorm; the barge had been cut down in 1915 from SS Seneca, coincidentally, a former Ward Line ship. Bad luck continued for Siboney on 5 January 1929, when she rammed and sank the Bauer Towing Company tug Phillip Hoffman off the Battery, killing the tug's engineer.

Siboney continued her same routes into the 1930s, and by 1933 typical runs for Siboney were from New York to Havana, Progreso, and Veracruz and back, omitting Progreso on the return. On one such return trip from Veracruz and Havana in April 1935, a passenger had $5,000 worth of diamond and platinum jewelry stolen while on board. By 1935, multiple public relations disasters for the Ward Line—the fire and sinking of Morro Castle off New Jersey in 1934 and the grounding of Havana and the sinking of Mohawk in the months that followed—caused the "Ward Line" name to be dropped in favor of the "Cuba Mail Line" moniker. By 1939, Siboney, still on the New York–Cuba–Mexico route, sported a new paint scheme of "dove grey" hull and black funnels with white markings to reflect this change in name. In late 1940, however, the struggling Cuba Mail Line chartered Siboney to American Export Lines which employed her on Jersey City–Lisbon service. During her American Export service, one of her passengers to the U.S. was French aviator and writer Antoine de Saint-Exupéry, when he emigrated in January 1941 to Asharoken, New York, after Germany's armistice with France.

On 12 April 1941 at 13:30, 320 nautical miles (590 km) out of Lisbon, the ship—painted with a large American flag and "American Export" lettering on each side—was accosted by "two submarine chasers flying British ensigns" that fired shots over Siboney's bow, one of which landed less than 100 feet (30 m) away from the ship. According to Siboney's captain, Wenzel Habel, the two ships were British corvette types marked "K-25" and "K-125"—which may have been Flower-class corvettes HMS Azalea (K25) and HMCS Kenogami (K125). After answering questions from "K-25" shouted via loudspeaker, Siboney was allowed to resume her course. Habel filed a protest with British officials when Siboney docked at Bermuda.

== World War II Army service ==
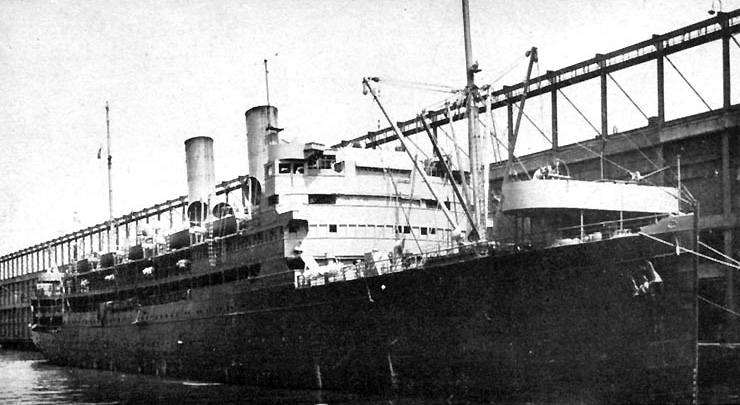
USAT Siboney in port, c. 1942–1943

At the conclusion of her seventh and final journey for American Export, Siboney was placed under time charter for duty as an Army transport. After a hasty outfitting, the redesignated USAT Siboney was put to work transporting troops. Based in New York, she made trips up and down the Atlantic and into the Caribbean, and, by the end of 1941, had called at Bermuda, San Juan, Trinidad, St. John's, Charleston, Newport News, Cristóbal, Jamaica, and Panama.

December 1941 saw Siboney depart from New York to Trinidad and on to Cape Town, then sailing up the east coast of Africa to Basra, Iraq, and Bandar Shahpur, Iran. The ship returned to Cape Town via Aden and underwent routine boiler repairs there, before returning to New York in April 1942. After undergoing six weeks of repairs at Bethlehem Steel Company, the transport sailed for Halifax, Iceland, and the Clyde, Scotland, in late May, returning to New York in July. Another trip to England and back followed in September 1942.

On 1 July 1942 the ship had been acquired by the War Shipping Administration (WSA) under a bareboat charter converting the Army's time charter to a sub bareboat charter. On 9 August 1943 WSA purchased the ship with the Army's bareboat charter continued.

In early December 1942 Siboney departed for Newfoundland but put into Halifax for two months of drydocking and repairs after she collided with SS City of Kimberly. After returning to New York in February 1943, she made several transatlantic runs, calling at Casablanca, Oran, Gibraltar, Clyde, Durban, Rio de Janeiro, Trinidad, and Cuba over the next 11 months. Siboney returned to New York for major repairs and reboilering at Bethlehem Steel Co. In January 1944, while undergoing this work, the ship was selected for conversion to a hospital ship.

U.S. Signal Corps photo print of the USAHS Charles A. Stafford, 1944

The ship was renamed USAHS Charles A. Stafford after Captain Charles A. Stafford of the U.S. Army Medical Corps, who was killed during the air raid on Broome, Western Australia, while participating in the evacuation of Java on 3 March 1942. With her conversion complete in September 1944, the Stafford, equipped with new boilers, a single stack in place of her original two, and other improvements, moved to her new homeport of Charleston. From that port the ship made monthly runs to the United Kingdom and back until May 1945, interrupting the pattern only once for a trip to Gibraltar and Marseille. Steaming to New York at the conclusion of her last transatlantic run, Charles A. Stafford was overhauled for duty in the South Pacific.

With the alterations complete, the veteran ship—now homeported at Los Angeles—sailed in August 1945 for Cristobál and on to Honolulu, Manila, Biak, Leyte, and Mindoro. After returning to Los Angeles in October, the Stafford sailed for Honolulu, Manila, and Enewetak and back.

After sailing to her new homeport of New York via the Panama Canal during February 1946, Charles A. Stafford resumed her North Atlantic runs to the United Kingdom.

On 30 August 1946 the Army transferred the ship to the Maritime Commission. On 16 February 1948 the ship was placed in the James River Reserve Fleet. Kept on reserve under the name Siboney, the ship was sold by the Maritime Administration on 2 January 1957 for $286,125 to Bethlehem Steel for scrapping.
