= SS Morro Castle (1900) =

SS Morro Castle, launched (1900)

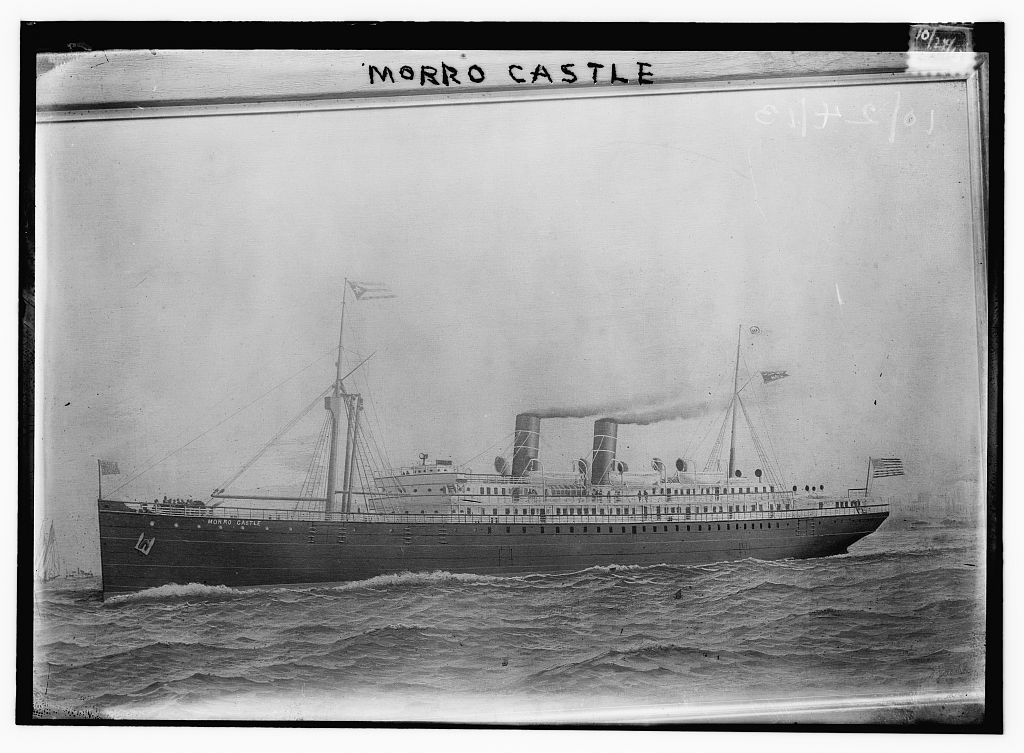
- SS Morro Castle, ca. 1910—1915.

History

United States
- Name: Morro Castle
- Owner: Ward Line
- Builder: William Cramp and Sons shipyard of Philadelphia
- Laid down: 1899
- Launched: 14 October 1900
- Out of service: 1924
- Identification: Official Number 93055
- Fate: Sold for scrap, 1926

General characteristics
- Type: Ocean liner
- Tonnage: 6,004 GRT
- Length: 121.92 m (400 ft 0 in)
- Beam: 15.24 m (50 ft 0 in)
- Propulsion: triple expansion steam engines
- Speed: 18 knots (33 km/h; 21 mph)
- Capacity: 242 passengers

SS Morro Castle was a passenger ship build in 1899 for the Ward Line Company. She was launched in April 14, 1900 and was named after the fortress of the same name, at the entrance to the Havana Bay, Cuba. On 14 May 1904 she sank the schooner Pleiades in a collision at sea after leaving New York for Havana. She was active during the Mexican Revolution. In 1924, the ship was retired in Brooklyn and In 1926, the ship was sold for scrap in Italy.

== Characteristics ==
The Morro Castle was 121.92 metres (400 ft 0 in) long and 15.24 metres (50 ft 0 in) wide and had two masts, two funnels and two propellers. The black painted hull was surmounted by a white superstructure. The ship was powered by triple expansion steam engines that allow a top speed of 18 knots (33 km/h; 21 mph). The passenger accommodations were designed for 136 in first class, 62 in second class, and 44 in third class, with the total of 242 passenger.

== Service history ==
After the completion of the Morro Castle, William Cramp & Sons delivered the ship to Ward Line in October 1900. On November 10, 1900, she set sail on her maiden voyage from, New York City to Havana. The command was the Ward Line commodore, Captain Cleveland Downs. Robert R. Willmott later became the ship's long-time captain. He later also took command of the second Morro Castle.

On May 16, 1904, the Morro Castle rammed the schooner Pleiades of the Fulton Fish Market off the coast of New Jersey, which sank as a result. The passenger liner rescued Captain Henry Ness and the other 17 crew members of the schooner. She was acquired by the US navy for the Mexican Revolution and World War 1. In 1924 the ship was laid up in Brooklyn and shortly thereafter in 1926 the ship was scrapped in Italy.
