= Down by the Old Mill Stream =

1910 song composed by Tell Taylor

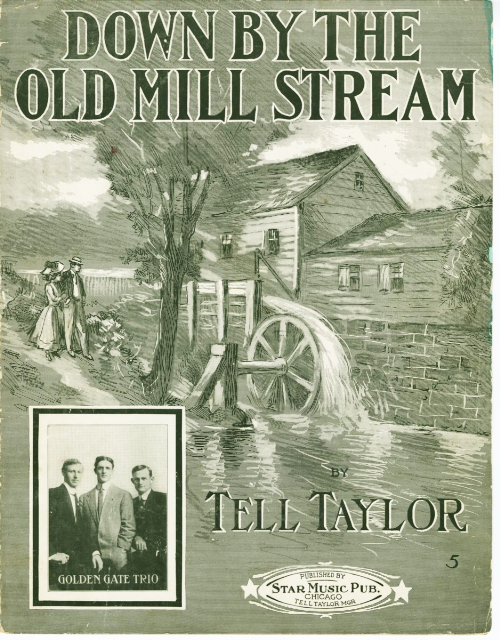
- Cover of sheet music, 1910.

Song
- Language: English
- Published: August 12, 1910 by Tell Taylor Music Publisher, Chicago
- Songwriter: Tell Taylor

Audio sample
- Recording of Down by the Old Mill Stream, performed by the Brunswick Quartette (1911): file; help

"Down by the Old Mill Stream" is a song written by Tell Taylor. It was one of the most popular songs of the early 20th century. The publisher Forster Music Publisher, Inc. sold 4 million copies.

== Background ==
The song was written in 1908 while Taylor was sitting on the banks of the Blanchard River in Findlay, Ohio. Reportedly, Taylor's friends persuaded him not to publish the song, believing it had no commercial value. In 1910 the song was published and introduced to the public with performances by the vaudeville quartet The Orpheus Comedy Four. After the group performed the song at a Woolworth store in Kansas City it became so popular that the store sold all 1,000 copies of the sheet music Taylor had brought with him. Since then over four million copies of its sheet music have been sold and it has become a staple for barbershop quartets.

== Recordings ==
Early popular recordings were by Arthur Clough (1911) and by Harry Macdonough (1912). Bing Crosby recorded the song on March 15, 1939 with John Scott Trotter's Frying Pan Five. The Mills Brothers included the song in their album Greatest Barbershop Hits (1959). Harry James recorded a version in 1965 on his album Harry James Plays Green Onions & Other Great Hits (Dot DLP 3634 and DLP 25634).

== Lyrics ==
(Verse 1)

My darling I am dreaming of the days gone by,
When you and I were sweethearts beneath the summer sky;
Your hair has turned to silver, the gold has faded too;
But still I will remember, where I first met you.

(Chorus)

Down by the old mill stream
Where I first met you,
With your eyes of blue,
Dressed in gingham too,
It was there I knew that you loved me true,
You were sixteen, my village queen,
By the old mill stream.

(Verse 2)

The old mill wheel is silent and has fallen down,
The old oak tree has withered and lies there on the ground;
While you and I are sweethearts the same as days of yore;
Although we've been together, forty years and more.

(Repeat Chorus)

== Popular culture ==
In the 1929 Columbia cartoon Farm Relief, Krazy and some animals sing "Down by the Old Mill Stream" after drinking some spirits.

Groucho and Chico Marx sing the tune a capella as they “scrub up” while posing as doctors in a scene in 1937’s ‘’A Day at the Races’’.

In the middle section of his song "We Will All Go Together When We Go," Tom Lehrer parodied "Down By the Old Mill Stream" with a stride piano, singing the following words in reference to a nuclear holocaust: "Down by the old Mael-strom/ There'll be a storm before the Calm."

In a 1958 episode of The Danny Thomas Show, called "Jack Benny Takes Danny's Job," comedian Jack Benny sings the song, with added lyrics, as part of a Cub Scouts show.

Alvin and the Chipmunks covered the song for their 1965 album The Chipmunks Sing with Children. They also performed the song as both the prologue and the epilogue for their 1982 album Chipmunk Rock.

In It's the Pied Piper, Charlie Brown, Snoopy (as the Pied Piper) plays the song on his concertina to lure the Mayor and his city council away from the city hall and they then sing the song.

Redd Foxx and LaWanda Page sing a duet version of "Down By The Old Mill Stream" in the Sanford and Son episode "My Fair Esther".

In an episode of All in the Family, Edith, Mike and Gloria wake up Archie singing this song.

In episode 295 of the Australian TV series Prisoner, Lizzie Birdsworth (Sheila Florence) sings the chorus of "Down By The Old Mill Stream" after becoming drunk on a bottle of whiskey given to her by prison officer Joan Ferguson (Maggie Kirkpatrick) in exchange for information.

In 1987, Opryland USA amusement park paid homage to the tune by naming its new water-based attraction "The Old Mill Scream". The ride was demolished (along with the entire park) in 1997.

In the 2014 video game "Skylanders: Trap Team, during Pain-Yatta's villain quest, the Gecko Chorus can be heard singing "Down by the Old Mill Stream"

== See also ==
- List of best-selling sheet music

== Bibliography ==
- Taylor, Tell. "Down By The Old Mill Stream" (Sheet music). Chicago: Star Music Pub. (1910)
