= SS Merida (1906) =

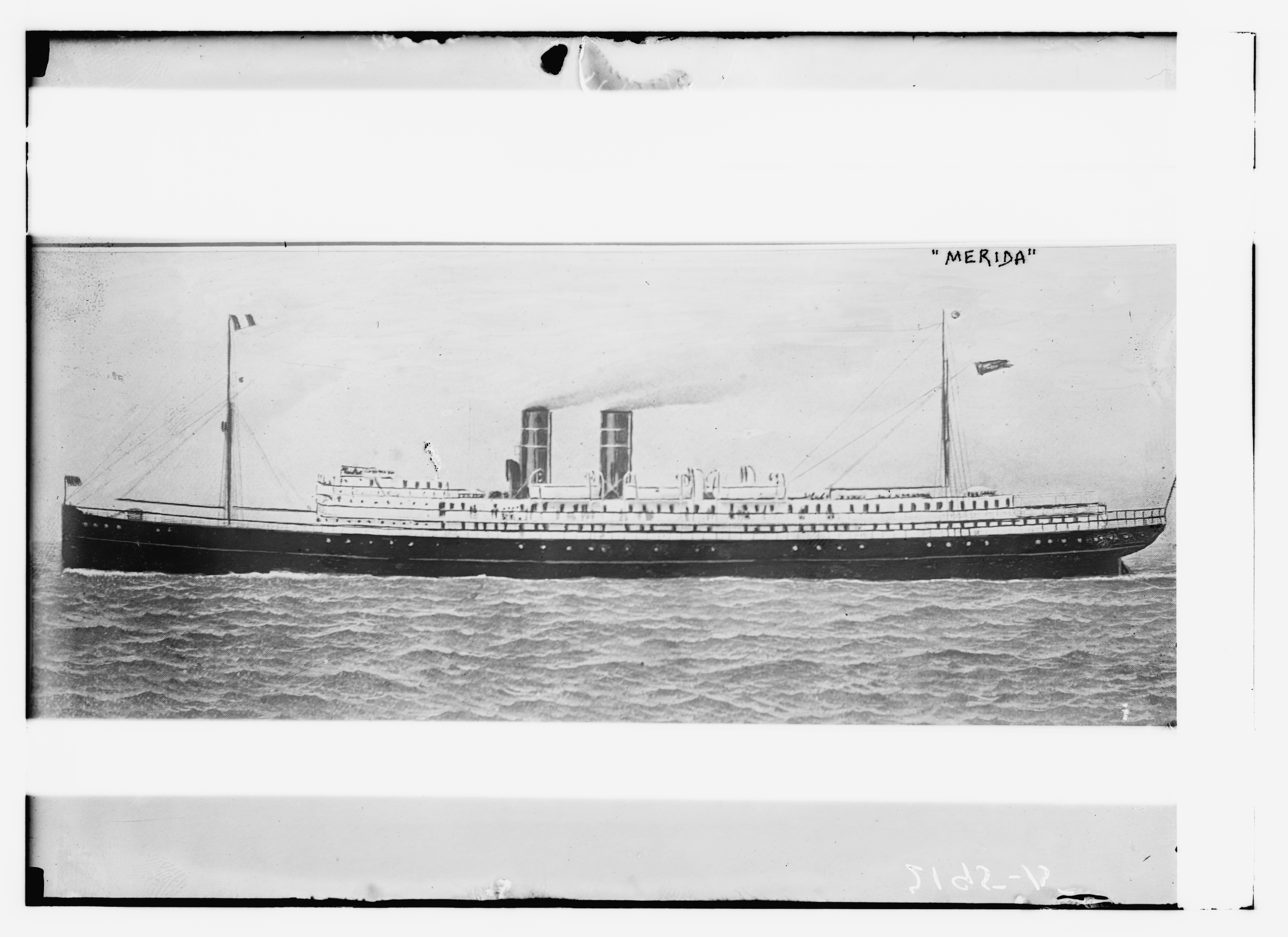

History

United States
- Name: Merida
- Namesake: Merida
- Owner: New York & Cuba Mail Steamship Co.
- Route: New York-Veracruz-Progreso-Havana-New York
- Builder: William Cramp & Sons, Philadelphia
- Yard number: 332
- Launched: 25 January 1906
- Sponsored by: Miss Florence Alker
- Commissioned: 11 April 1906
- Maiden voyage: 21 April 1906
- Home port: New York
- Identification: US Official number 202864; Call sign KVGF
- Fate: Sank, 12 May 1911
- Notes: Wreck site coordinates: 37°20′0″N 74°40′57″W

General characteristics
- Type: Passenger Cargo Ship
- Tonnage: 6,207 GRT; 3,824 NRT
- Length: 400 ft 0 in (121.92 m)
- Beam: 50 ft 2 in (15.29 m)
- Depth: 17 ft 5 in (5.31 m)
- Installed power: 749 Nhp
- Propulsion: 2 × William Cramp & Sons 3-cylinder triple expansion; Two propellers
- Speed: 17 knots (31 km/h; 20 mph)
- Capacity: 189 first-class passengers; 48 second-class passengers; 24 steerage passengers

Merida was a steam cargo ship built in 1906 by William Cramp & Sons of Philadelphia for New York & Cuba Mail Steamship Co., owned and operated by Ward Line, with intention of serving their New York to Havana route.

== Design and construction ==
Following the sale of two of their older vessels, SS Havana and SS Mexico, to the US Government in 1905, Ward Line placed an order for four steamers to be built to operate on their expanding Cuban and Mexican trade routes. These vessels were built with accordance with the Ocean Mail Act of 1891, which required the vessels to be constructed with a possibility of being converted into auxiliary cruisers in case of war, and be able to carry eleven 5 inch guns. Merida was the first of these vessels and was laid down at the William Cramp & Sons' Kensington Yard in Philadelphia (yard number 332) and launched on 25 January 1906, with Miss Florence Alker, daughter of Mr. Alphonse Alker, and a granddaughter of James E. Ward, founder of the Ward Lines, serving as the sponsor. The ship had 4 decks, and was designed to provide luxury accommodations for 189 first-class passengers, including the smoking room on the upper deck, a drawing room, library and social hall. In addition, the vessel had all the modern machinery fitted for quick loading and unloading of cargo, had seven watertight bulkheads, and also had electrical lights installed and was equipped with the De Forest system of wireless telegraphy.

The initial sea trials were held on April 2–3, 1906 off Cape Henlopen, during which the steamer was able to reach maximum speed of 18.75 knots (21.58 mph; 34.73 km/h) over several runs, which was well over the contractual speed of 15.0 knots (17.3 mph; 27.8 km/h). After successful completion of ocean trials three days later, the ship was transferred to her owners and departed for New York on April 11.

As built, the ship was 400 feet 0 inches (121.92 m) long (between perpendiculars) and 50 feet 2 inches (15.29 m) abeam, a depth of 17 feet 5 inches (5.31 m). Merida was assessed at 6,207 GRT and 3,824 NRT. The vessel had a steel hull, and two sets of triple-expansion steam engines, with cylinders of 28-inch (71 cm), 46-inch (120 cm) and 76-inch (190 cm) diameter with a 42-inch (110 cm) stroke that provided a combined 749 nhp and drove two screw propellers, and moved the ship at up to 17.0 knots (19.6 mph; 31.5 km/h).

== Operational history ==
Upon delivery Merida sailed from Philadelphia for New York on April 11, 1906, and after loading, departed on her maiden voyage on April 21 for Havana. After embarking on cargo and 206 passengers she left Cuba on April 28 and arrived in New York on May 1 after 2 days and 18 hour long uneventful journey, bringing her maiden voyage to a successful ending. Among her first passengers were Alfred Smith, manager of the Ward Line, who made a round-trip voyage, Lionel Carden, British Minister to Cuba, Countess Wachmeister, and Daniel Bacon, Havana-based ship operator.

Commencing with her second trip and through the end of her career Merida would be serving on the same route, taking her from New York to Vera Cruz and Progreso in Mexico and then continuing to Havana before returning to New York. Besides passengers and mails, the steamer was carrying a large variety of general cargo from Mexico and Cuba ranging from exotic things such as alligator skins, jalap and fustic to hemp, coffee, pineapples, mahogany, rubber, tobacco and cigars. Starting from 1908 the vessel also began carrying Mexican silver from the port of Vera Cruz. For example, on May 16, 1908 Merida brought to New York 160 bars of silver in addition to 200 passengers and a large miscellaneous cargo. With improving silver prices and increased production, the silver exports grew in 1909-1910 too, for instance on March 18, 1910, the steamer brought 256 silver bars in addition to other general cargo. With the eruption of the Mexican Revolution in November 1910, silver exports nearly doubled, reaching 452 bars when Merida arrived in New York on November 25, 1910.

On January 21, 1911 Merida arrived at New York significantly delayed due losing her port side propeller approximately 160 miles out of Havana. The vessel soon returned to service after completion of the repairs.

=== Sinking ===
Merida left for her last journey from New York on April 20, 1911, heading for her usual destinations. After embarking cargo and most of her passengers (89) at Vera Cruz, most of them Americans fleeing the violence in Mexico, she left the port for her return trip on May 4. The steamer called at Progreso to take on more cargo and more passengers (22), including Archbishop of Yucatán Martín Tritschler y Córdoba and his brother and secretary Guillermo, and continued to Havana, which she departed on May 9 after taking on board additional cargo and 77 more passengers. Due to ongoing turmoil in Mexico and with anticipated resignation of President Porfirio Díaz, many wealthy Mexicans boarded the U.S.-bound ship to wait out the revolution abroad. Merida was under command of captain Archibald Robertson and had a crew of 131 men. Overall, the steamer had 188 passengers on board (131 first-class, 32 second-class and 25 steerage). Her cargo consisted of general merchandise such as coffee, hides, tobacco, mahogany, and fruit, but on this voyage the ship carried 699 copper bars for ballast and 372 silver bars and 36 bars of mixed silver. On May 11 the ship reached Virginia coast and continued north by east. The night was dark with calm seas, and around midnight she encountered a fog bank. The speed was dropped down to about 7 or 8 knots with the ship staying her course. At about 00:15, while roughly 52 miles east and one half mile north off Cape Charles, a lookout spotted a steamer suddenly appearing out of the haze. As the distance between the vessels was very short, no action could really be taken to avoid the collision, and the incoming steamer, later identified as a fruit boat Admiral Farragut on passage from Philadelphia to Port Antonio in ballast, crashed abaft amidships into the port side of Merida, knocking out her engines and disabling her electrical dynamo. Merida's operator, Herbert O. Benson, was able to send a distress signal and was able to reach Hatteras station, but about ten minutes after the collision the ship went completely black as her electricity supply was drained. Passengers jumped out of their cabins in their night clothing and a panic ensued but the crowd was quickly brought down under control by the captain and the officers of the steamer. Six lifeboats were launched and two rafts were dropped and all passengers and crew were able to disembark the ship.

Meanwhile, Admiral Farragut suffered severe damage to her bow, but her fore collision bulkheads held and she remained afloat and was standing by. Unfortunately, her own wireless apparatus went broken due to collision and could not be used. All passengers and the entire crew, with the exception of the captain, first officer and 4 others, who stayed on board Merida, were transferred to Admiral Farragut without an incident. Only one passenger, a wife of a wealthy Mexican hemp grower Augusto Peon, was injured in the collision, possibly because she was in the cabin closest to the point of impact. Herbert O. Benson (incorrectly reported as Perry E. Benton in some newspapers) was sent by captain Robertson aboard the fruit freighter and together with her operator, A. C. Leech, was able to repair the malfunctioning wireless, and a distress signal was sent out seeking help around 05:30. Fortunately, due to collision being so close to the coast, four ships, Old Dominion steamer Hamilton, battleship Iowa, and torpedo boats Stringham and Bailey, were in the immediate vicinity, and they all responded to the calls for help. Hamilton was about 45 to 50 miles and Iowa was approximately 55 miles north, while torpedo boats were roughly 60 miles south of the place of the collision. Captain Robertson and the rest of the crew finally left the sinking Merida at 05:30 and by 05:50 she went down, sinking in approximately 35 fathoms (210 ft) of water. Both Iowa and Hamilton arrived shortly after 08:00, after navigating through heavy fog. Due to precarious position of steamer Admiral Farragut a decision was made to transfer an entire Merida's crew and passengers to the steamship Hamilton and the second transfer was initiated at about 08:45 and finished by approximately 10:45 with Iowa's cutters aiding in finishing the rescue operation. Both torpedo boats also arrived at the scene and stood by ready to help. Eventually, Hamilton departed the area and arrived at Norfolk at around 19:00. Admiral Farragut remained on site of the collision for a while trying to patch up damage as much as possible, before slowly proceeding to Delaware Breakwater accompanied by Iowa.

A hearing was held in Norfolk following the collision and sinking, however, both captains were exonerated of any blame due to a sudden onset of unusual atmospheric conditions which made an accident unavoidable.

== Treasures of Merida ==
At the time of Merida's loss, her total value including the ship and the cargo was estimated to be approximately US$2,000,000 (equivalent to $69,000,000 in 2025). After the sinking, many Mexican refugees claimed they carried significant amount of cash and jewelry, undeclared, in their luggage or on their persons. Some claimed they deposited their valuables in the ship's safe which went down with the vessel. Rumors of hundreds of thousands of dollars on board the ship soon translated into a belief that the ship's cargo was significantly more valuable than first thought and many more attempts would be made over the years to retrieve the treasure. At some point in 1916, another rumor appeared that Merida carried crown jewels and famous rubies belonging to Empress Carlota being smuggled out of Mexico, which roughly doubled the value of presumed treasure. After the inquiry commission refused to put blame on the American Mail Steamship Company, a lessee of Admiral Farragut, owners of Merida filed a libel lawsuit for US$1,800,000 in the New York District Court. Out of this total, US$237,500 was for the silver bars, US$90,000 for mahogany logs and US$25,730 for copper bars. The bulk of the claim was for the vessel herself, amounting roughly to US$1,200,000. On March 15, 1912, a decision was rendered by the court ordering American Mail Steamship Company to pay only US$105,000 to the New York & Cuba Mail Steamship Co., citing the limitation of liability.

As Merida sank at the depth considerably exceeding one reachable by divers at the time, about 100 ft (30 m), underwriters had to look for inventors involved in design of apparatus capable to conduct such work. The first contract was awarded to captain Williamson, an inventor of a special submarine tube caisson which according to him would allow a person to submerge down the tube to significant depths and be able to extract valuable cargo. That project went nowhere and the first serious attempt to raise Merida was not attempted until July 1916. An expedition was organized by the Interocean Submarine Engineering Co., headed by the retired Rear Admiral Colby M. Chester, and led by the famous diver George D. Stillson. The effort was financed by several Wall Street financiers, including Percy Rockefeller, James A. Stillman and Charles H. Sabin. As the wreck position was only vaguely known to the members of the expedition they spent more than two months searching for the wreck and finally gave up in early October 1916 due to worsening weather failing to locate it.

In 1917 Brooklyn engineer Benjamin Franklin Leavitt patented and successfully tested his underwater armor suit during the salvage work he did on SS Pewabic which sank in Lake Huron in 1865. In 1920 Leavitt turned his attention to Merida and other treasure ships and attempted to organize an expedition, but failed to get financial backing. Instead, a group of wealthy New Yorkers incorporated as the H.L. Gotham Corp. attempted to raise the vessel in 1921. They employed three very experienced divers including Frank Crilley and even claimed they located the wreck but the onset of bad weather forced them to abandon their effort in late November after a series of accidents without yielding any results after almost three months of work.

Merida had to wait until 1924 when a group of prominent New Yorkers including Anthony J. Drexel Biddle, Jr., Franklin I. Malory, W. Heyward Drayton, and John S. Ball chartered several trawlers and about 30 men with several experienced divers, including Frank Grilley among them, to attempt to find the treasures. After starting their work in early October they were able to find the wreck of Merida after a couple weeks of dragging, and divers were able to examine it. However, an onset of bad weather yet again halted the salvage operations and on November 22 it was reported that the group had to abandon their work until next spring. The search resumed on June 8, 1925, and after two about to weeks of dragging, the wreck was located again in 213 feet (65 m) of water on June 21. One of the divers descended down in armor suit for examination, and ascertained the hulk was indeed that of Merida. The ship was found in an approximate position of 37.24°N 74.32°W consistent with what was derived by the commanding officers of the vessel at the time of the collision. Merida was found to be laying on her side on a hard ridge embedded in about 16 feet of hard sand which blocked access to the strong room, located amidships the vessel. In addition, strong undercurrents were encountered halfway down to the bottom making divers' descent dangerous and forcing suspension of salvage work on a few occasions. The salvage work had to be suspended at the end of September after arrival of bad weather, and even though plans were made to resume the operation next spring, they never materialized.

The arrival of the Great Depression postponed any further attempts to raise the steamer, and it was not until 1931 that a new expedition was contemplated, this time by Sub-Ocean Salvage Corp., formed by several well-known New Yorkers including Vincent Astor, Lyttleton Fox, Rhinelander Stewart, Albert Gallatin and E. Vail Stebbins. The expedition was headed by famous American engineer, inventor, showman and adventurer captain Harry L. Bowdoin, and the dive work was to be led by John Dahl. By mid-August 1931 the financial backers decided not to pursue the salvage and the expedition was postponed. It took about a year for captain Bowdoin to find new sponsors, and the work finally started in summer of 1932, with the divers being able to locate the hulk in August. The work continued for another month and abruptly ended in early October, when the crew refused to go out to sea due to unpaid wages. The conflict was soon temporarily resolved, and the salvage attempts resumed in November, with the divers again finding the wreck and blasting a hole in her side to access the strong room. However, with the chief diver, John Dahl, soon dying from "heart complications" (most likely "the bends") and with weather turning bad, and crew still unpaid the efforts to raise the treasure came to an end.

In April 1933 captain Bowdoin returned to Norfolk to resume his search only to discover a local rival group consisting of captain John Hall, diver Klass Evarts and Peter Mikkelson were ready to depart on the treasure hunt of their own. Swiftly filing an injunction in the local court, captain Bowdoin and his well-armed crew (or so they claimed) immediately left Norfolk to the wreck site to guard it against the intruders at all costs. After the wreck was found, the situation escalated with both parties attempting to interfere with other's efforts and resulted in US Coastal Guard sending their cutter Davis on May 8 to the wreck site in order to keep the situation after control. Hall soon abandoned his search and instead filed a lawsuit asking the court to grant him an exclusive access to the wreck site. While the legal battle continued, Bowdoin reported on July 21 that his expedition was able to raise the purser's safe from Merida' strong room. The safe was immediately arrested by the US Customs upon arrival in port and was kept in their custody through the duration of legal proceedings. In August a few American and Mexican coins were brought to port together with a waiter's badge proving the wreck indeed belonged to Merida. Continuing with their search the divers were able to examine the strongroom and claimed they have found nothing of value in it. Furthermore, Bowdoin claimed the safe was found open and contained only a few keys and worthless papers. Under such circumstances the expedition was terminated in early October. The legal battle continued through early part of 1934 and was finally decided in favor of captain Bowdoin. Following its outcome, he started planning another expedition and was about to depart for Norfolk to resume the search when he suddenly died in August 1935.

Another attempt was made by the New York Salvage Co. in 1936 but their schooner Constellation ran into a gale soon after departing New York and sustained considerable damage including a lost anchor forcing the expedition to return for repairs and subsequently cancelling it altogether.

In May 1938 a 500-ton Italian salvage ship Falco departed Spezia for Norfolk carrying the first foreign expedition headed by captain Luigi Faggian in search of Merida's treasures. The work started on June 27 but progressed very slowly due to frequent stormy weather, nevertheless the divers were able to bring up a few minor items to the surface, such as dishes, thermometers and a few coins. Merida was claimed to be badly damaged by previous expeditions using dynamite indiscriminately with her upper decks completely collapsed. The divers were able to get to within 12 feet of the strong room, but the work was halted and abandoned in early September due to stormy weather and poor underwater visibility caused by the ongoing hurricane season. The search resumed in April 1939 and this time the expedition was able to get inside the strong room, only to find it absolutely empty. A 2-pound silver ingot worth US$7.20 was the only treasure that Falco's expedition was able to discover by August 1939, and after spending close to US$100,000 the Italians abandoned their search and returned to Italy. With the start of World War II all tries to find Merida's treasure were put on hold for a very long time.

There were no any further large scale attempts to raise the presumed fortunes hidden in Merida's wreck. The treasure-hunting organization Gulfstream Ventures secured legal control over the wreck site in 2013 by "arresting" the vessel through court order but have yet to recover any valuables.
