= City of Washington (ship) =

American merchant steamship

Coordinates: 25.1465°N 80.2558°W

History

United States
- Name: City of Washington
- Namesake: Washington, D.C.
- Owner: Ward Line
- Builder: John Roach & Sons
- Launched: 30 August 1877
- Refit: As a coal barge, 1911
- Fate: Wrecked off Key Largo, 10 July 1917

General characteristics
- Tonnage: 2,600
- Propulsion: Compound steam engine, auxiliary sails
- Sail plan: Hermaphrodite brig

City of Washington was an American merchant steamship that aided in rescuing the crew of USS Maine when it exploded in the harbor of Havana, Cuba, in 1898.

== Construction and merchant service ==
Built at John Roach & Sons shipyard for Alexandre & Sons, City of Washington was a 2,600-ton iron ship both equipped with a compound surface condensing engine and rigged as a hermaphrodite brig. She was launched on August 30, 1877, in Chester, Pennsylvania. Later acquired by the New York and Cuba Mail Steamship Company, City of Washington was refitted in 1889 with a triple expansion steam engine. City of Washington operated under the Ward Line and was assigned to passenger and trade routes between New York City, Havana, and Mexican gulf ports such as Campeche and Progreso.

== USS Maine and the Spanish–American War ==
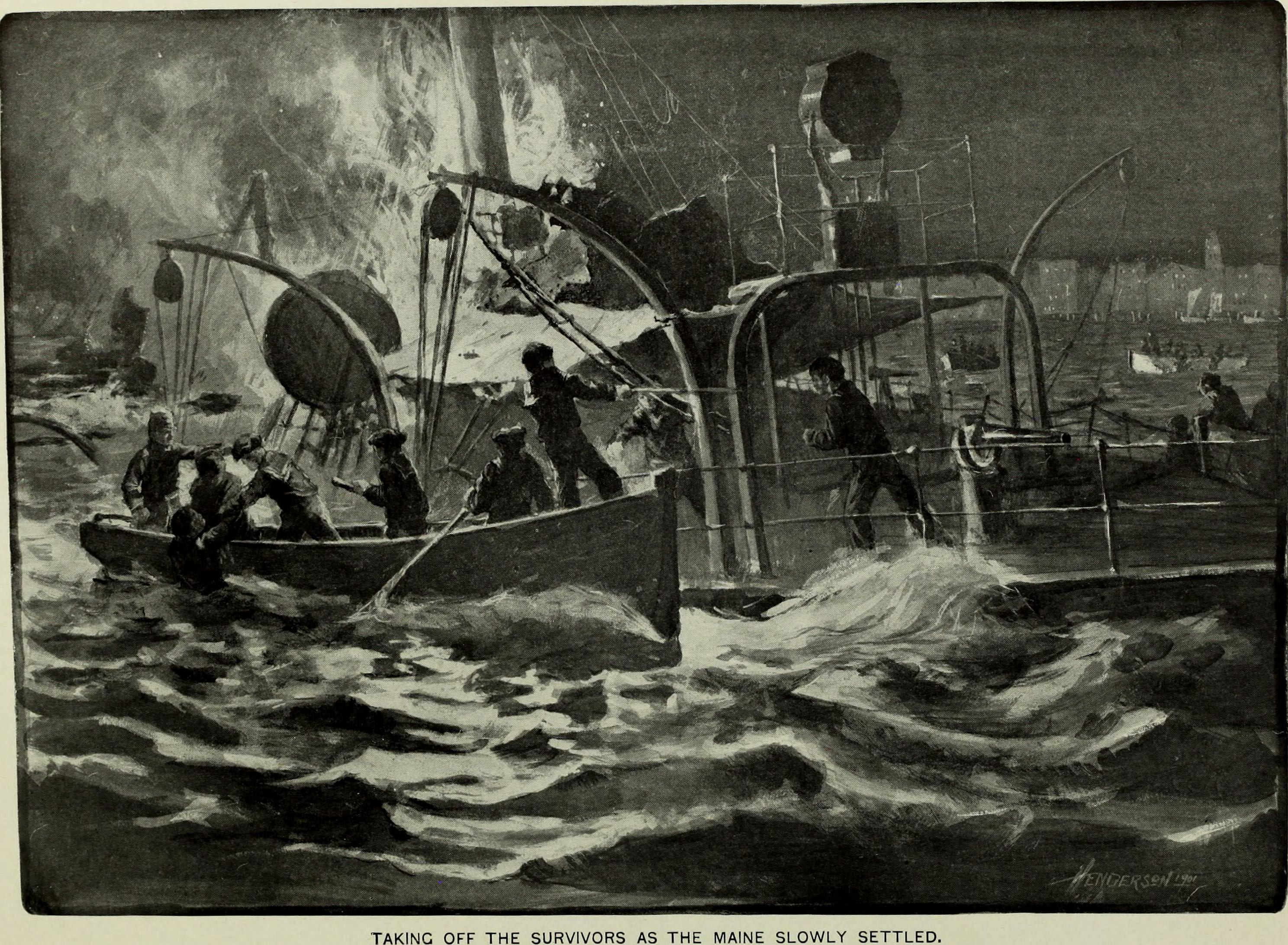
A lifeboat from the City of Washington takes off survivors from the USS Maine

On the night of February 15, 1898, City of Washington was moored in Havana harbor near USS Maine when Maine exploded in the incident that precipitated the Spanish–American War. City of Washington suffered minor damage in the explosion, but assisted in the rescue of Maine's crew by sending out lifeboats and providing her dining salon for use as a makeshift hospital. The efforts of City of Washington and the Spanish cruiser Alfonso XII resulted in the rescue of approximately 100 crew members from Maine.

Captain Frank Stevens and other crew members of City of Washington provided eyewitness testimony on the Maine disaster in Naval Court of Inquiry hearings which ended on March 21, 1898. The Court of Inquiry concluded that Maine was destroyed by the explosion of a submarine mine. While the Court did not place responsibility for the explosion, media and popular opinion overwhelmingly attributed it to Spain's forces in Cuba. Shortly thereafter, Congress declared a state of War with Spain, effective April 20, 1898.

In April 1898, City of Washington was one of many civilian steamships chartered by the US Army Quartermaster Department for use as a transport ship for the invasion of Cuba. She was chartered as Transport #16 at the rate of USD $450 per day through September 1898.

== Return to merchant service ==
In late 1898, City of Washington returned to her prior civilian duties, ferrying passengers from New York to Cuba until 1908 when the ship was retired and laid up at Brooklyn, New York. In 1911 she was purchased by Luckenbach Steamship Company of New York. Her superstructure and machinery were removed, and she went into operation as a coal barge.

== Wreck ==
On July 10, 1917, City of Washington and another barge, Seneca, were under tow by the tugboat Luckenbach 4 when all three vessels ran aground on a shallow reef near Key Largo in the Florida Keys. The other two vessels were refloated on July 15, but City of Washington broke up immediately and was not recoverable. Now a popular dive site, the City of Washington wreck has been designated part of the Florida Keys National Marine Sanctuary's Shipwreck Trail.
