= New Era (1854 ship) =

Ship wrecked in 1854

Coordinates: 40.227°N 73.993°W

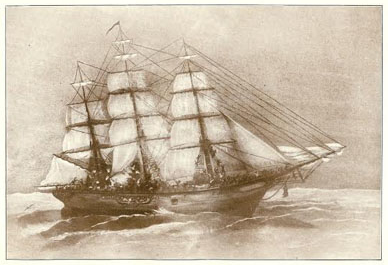
- New Era

History
- Name: New Era
- Launched: 1854
- Fate: Wrecked, November 13, 1854

General characteristics
- Propulsion: Sails
- Sail plan: Full-rigged ship

New Era was a ship that wrecked on November 13, 1854, with the reported loss of about 150 lives, off present-day Asbury Park, New Jersey, coincidentally at almost the identical location the SS Morro Castle ran aground in 1934 after a devastating fire that had killed 137 crew and passengers.

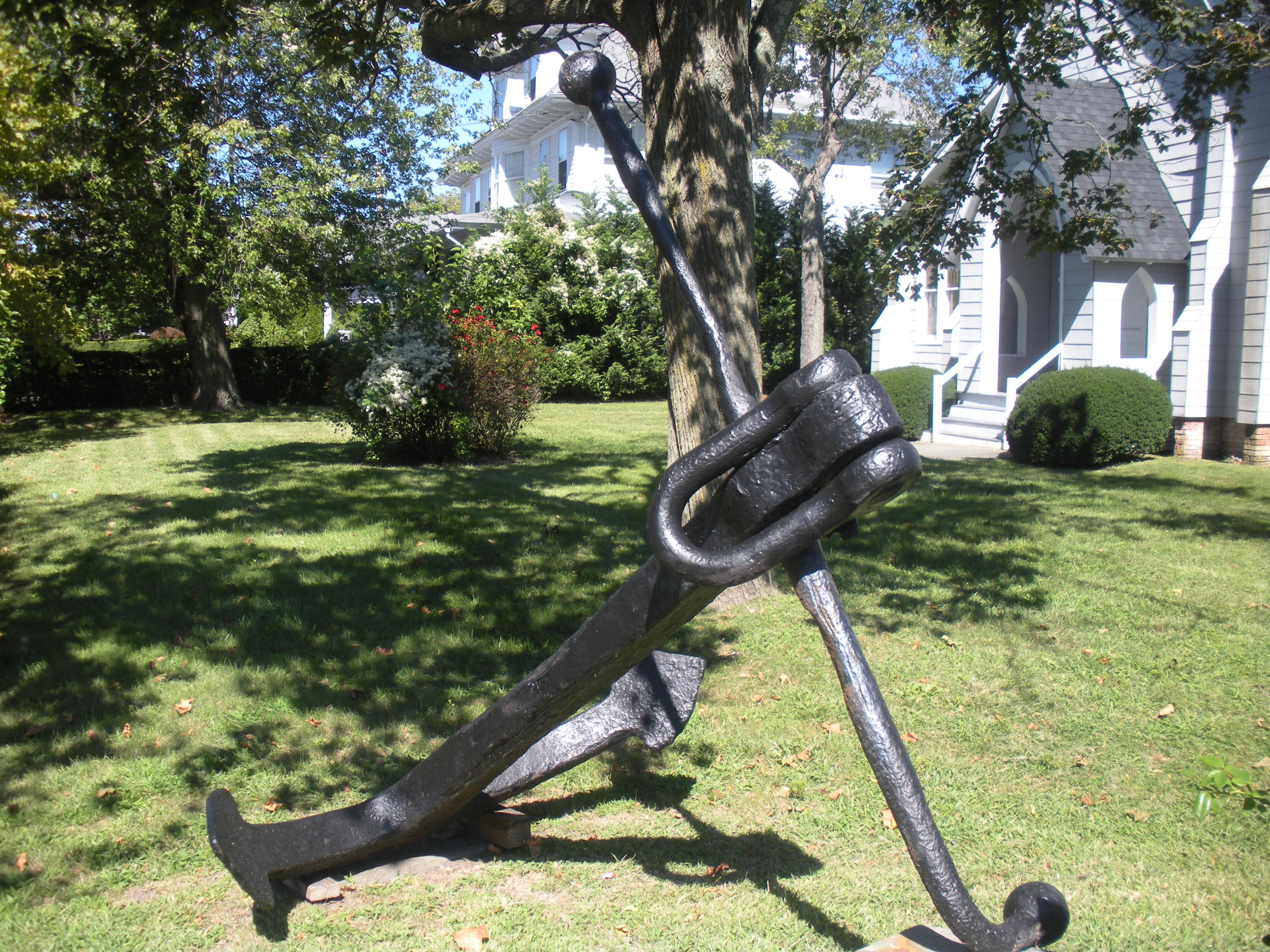
Recovered anchor from wreck

== The journey ==
New Era was built in Bath, Maine as an emigrant ship of 1328 tons in 1854 and set sail on this its first voyage on September 28. The ship was carrying nearly all German emigrants having sailed from Bremen, Germany with a final destination of New York. The crossing was difficult with 40 passengers being lost to cholera during the journey. It was later reported that New Era was a leaky ship with both crew and passengers required to man pumps during the voyage.

== Grounding ==
New Era grounded in a dense fog in the morning hours of 13 November with the reported loss of about 150 lives.

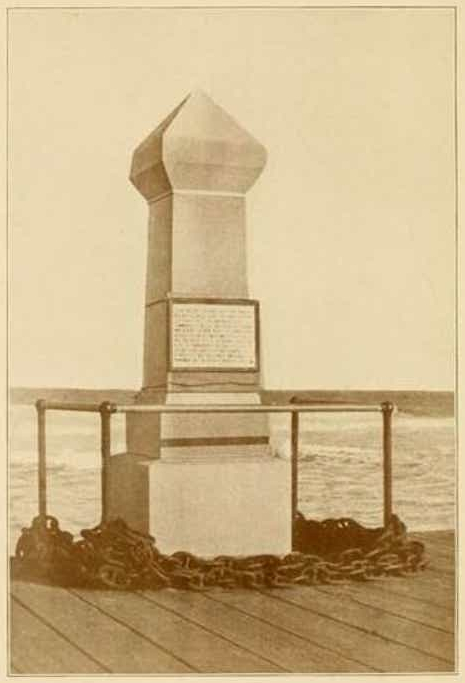
Monument to 'New Era' disaster

Monument to the German passengers of the New Era shipwreck at Old First United Methodist Church in West Long Branch, placed in 1892 by the New Era Monument Association of N.J.

== Memorial marker ==
A monument to the German survivors was placed in 1892 in Old First United Methodist Church in West Long Branch, NJ, 5 miles northwest of the wreck site.

Asbury Park founder James A. Bradley placed a memorial marker for the wreck in 1893; it was lost to sea shortly after. On September 15, 2012 an archeological search performed with ground penetrating radar failed to find the monument.
