= Edward Owings Towne =

American lawyer and playwright

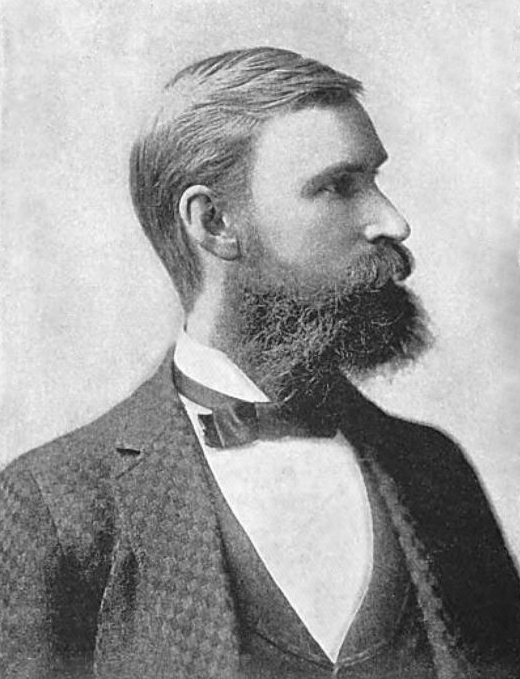
- Born: Edward Owings Towne Jr. February 19, 1859 or 1860 Pella, Iowa, U.S.
- Died: March 6, 1938 (aged 78 or 79)
- Occupation: Lawyer, playwright
- Education: Iowa Central University
- Notable works: "The Madonna in Chains"
- Spouse: Sara Johnston Cooper (m. 1889)

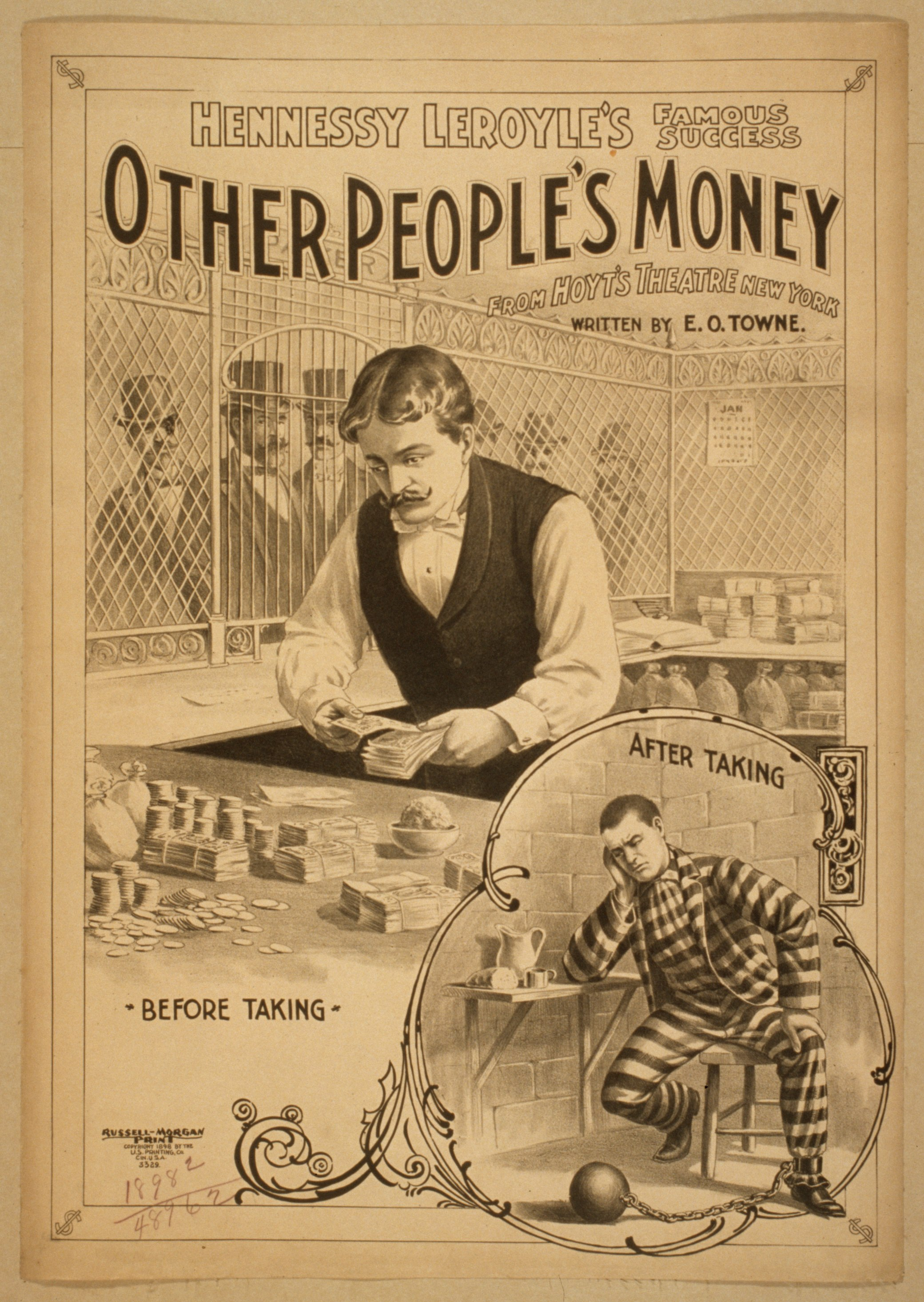
Advertising the 1895 Other People's Money show at Hoyt's Theatre in New York City, lithograph by Russell Morgan

Aphorisms of the Three Threes

The completion of the spire, and other poems

Edward Owings Towne Jr. (February 19, 1859 or February 19, 1860 – March 6, 1938) was an American lawyer in Chicago, who became a writer. He wrote poems, stories, plays, and comedies.

== Early life and education ==
He was born on either February 19, 1859 or February 19, 1860 in Pella, Iowa. His father, Rev. E. O. Towne (died 1874), established Iowa Central University. His father was noted in "Souvenir History of Pella, Iowa (1847–1922)," as a land agent who greeted people arriving by covered wagon.

Towne studied at Iowa Central University.

== Career ==
Towne wrote Aphorisms of the Three Threes (1887). He wrote The completion of the spire, and other poems (1889). He wrote the play By Wits Outwitted (1897). He wrote Ideals of an Idol-breaker; A Poem of the New Philosophy (1913). He wrote Philosophy of Jesus; A Narrative of the Life and Teachings of Jesus of Nazareth (1928). He wrote Scientific Money, a Cure for Panics and Financial Depressions (1930).

Towne wrote the 1895 play Other People's Money, which was performed at Hoyt's Theatre in New York City the same year. He also wrote A Little Drunkardess, A Masked Battery, and Literary Duet By Wits Outwitted, was staged in Cleveland, Ohio in 1893 and was accompanied by A Glimpse of Paradise by Frank S. Pixley. Tell Taylor starred in the show. His play For Sweet Charity's Sake won him a thousand dollar prize in a Best One Act play competition circa 1895 and his play By Wits Outwitted ran for at least two years. His story "The Madonna in Chains" was adapted into the 1923 film The Women in Chains.

He was found guilty of conspiring to wreck the Lumbermen's Building and Loan Association in October 1898, and was fined US$1,500 and sentenced to serve an indeterminate sentence time in Joliet Prison (now Joliet Correctional Center).

He died on March 6, 1938.

In 2004 a family in Vista, California found a shoebox full of family memorabilia including photographs, letters, and other documents from E. O. Towne and his family. He corresponded with Charles Eastwick Smith, which is part of the "Charles Eastwick Smith letters from botanists" archives at the Academy of Natural Sciences of Drexel University.

== Personal life and family ==
Towne married Sara Johnston Cooper in 1889. Their son Fenimore Cooper Towne was born c. 1893 and died at the family home in 1918 of sepsis poisoning at the age of 25.

== Book publications ==
- Aphorisms of the Three Threes (1887)
- The Completion of the Spire, and Other Poems (1889)
- By Wits Outwitted (1897)
- Ideals of an Idol-breaker; a Poem of the New Philosophy (1913)
- Philosophy of Jesus; A Narrative of the Life and Teachings of Jesus of Nazareth (1928)
- Scientific Money, a Cure for Panics and Financial Depressions (1930)

== Screenplay and playwright work ==
=== Stage playwright ===
- For Sweet Charity's Sake (c. 1895)
- Other People's Money (1895)
- Literary Duet By Wits Outwitted (1897)
- A Masked Battery
- A Little Drunkardess

=== Filmography ===
- The Woman in Chains (1923), as the screenplay writer
