= Automatic trip =

An automatic trip is an action performed by some system, usually a safety instrumented system, programmable logic controller, or distributed control system, to put an industrial process into a safe state. It is triggered by some parameter going into a pre-determined unsafe state. It is usually preceded by an alarm to give a process operator a chance to correct the condition to prevent the trip, since trips are usually costly because of lost production.
