= SS Morro Castle (1930) =

American ocean liner

Coordinates: 40.2281°N 73.9942°W

- Morro Castle

History

United States
- Name: Morro Castle
- Namesake: Morro Castle
- Owner: Atlantic, Gulf & West Indies SS Lines (1930–33); Agwi Navigation Co, Inc (1933–34)
- Operator: Ward Line
- Route: New York City – Havana
- Builder: Newport News Ship Building & Drydock Co., Newport News, Virginia, U.S.
- Cost: US$4,000,000
- Yard number: 337
- Launched: March 5, 1930
- Completed: August 15, 1930
- Maiden voyage: August 23, 1930
- Out of service: September 8, 1934
- Home port: New York City, New York, U.S.
- Identification: US official number 230069; code letters MJCR (1930–1933); call sign KGOV (1934–1935)
- Fate: Caught fire and beached herself on September 8, 1934; later towed off and sold to breakers (Union Shipbuilding Co.) Scrapped

General characteristics
- Tonnage: 11,520 GRT; 6,449 NRT
- Length: 480 ft 0 in (146.3 m)
- Beam: 70 ft 9 in (21.6 m)
- Depth: 18 ft 5 in (5.6 m)
- Installed power: 14,000 ihp
- Propulsion: steam turbo-electric transmission; twin screws
- Speed: 20 knots (37 km/h)
- Capacity: 489 passengers
- Crew: 240 crew
- Sensors & processing systems: direction finding equipment; submarine signalling equipment (removed by 1934); gyrocompass (added by 1934); echo sounding equipment (added by 1934)
- Notes: sister ship: Oriente

SS Morro Castle was an American ocean liner that caught fire and ran aground on the morning of September 8, 1934, en route from Havana, Cuba, to New York City, United States, with the loss of 137 passengers and crew.

On the previous evening, Morro Castle's captain, Robert Willmott, had died suddenly, and his place was taken by Chief Officer William Warms as a strong northeast wind was developing under heavy cloud. At 2:50am, a fire was detected in a storage locker, which burned through electrical cables, engulfed the ship in flames and plunged it into darkness. Responses by the crew, the United States Coast Guard and rescue vessels were notably slow and inefficient, with lifeboats not loaded to their capacity. The decks were too hot to stand on, smoke made breathing difficult and passengers were forced to leap into ocean swells where swimming was impossible. By mid-afternoon Morro Castle was abandoned and the survivors were landed on the shores of New Jersey by an assortment of craft.

The cause of the fire was never established, though an overheated funnel and certain points of cabin design and electrical circuitry were noted. A theory of arson by a crew member has attracted support over the years, albeit without any concrete evidence. The high casualties are chiefly blamed on the crew's incompetent handling of the emergency.

== Building ==
On May 22, 1928, the United States Congress passed the Merchant Marine Act of 1928, creating a $250 million construction fund to be lent to American shipping companies to replace old and outdated ships with new ones. Each of these loans, which could subsidize as much as seventy-five percent of the cost of the ship, was to be paid back over twenty years at low interest rates.

One company that availed itself of this opportunity was the New York and Cuba Mail Steam Ship Company, better known as the Ward Line, which had been carrying passengers, cargo and mail to and from Cuba since the mid-19th century. Naval architects were hired by the Ward Line to design a pair of passenger liners to be named Morro Castle, after the stone fortress and lighthouse in Havana, and Oriente, after Cuba's Oriente Province.

At the Newport News Shipbuilding and Dry Dock Company, work was begun on Morro Castle in January 1929. In March 1930 the ship was christened, followed in May by her sister ship Oriente. Each ship was 508 feet (155 metres) long, measured 11,520 gross register tons (GRT) and had turbo-electric transmission, with General Electric twin turbo generators supplying current to propulsion motors on twin propeller shafts. Each ship was luxuriously finished to accommodate 489 passengers in first and tourist class and 240 officers and crew. In a growing age of passenger ships having cruiser sterns, Morro Castle and Oriente were built with classic counter sterns.

As built, Morro Castle was equipped with direction finding and submarine signalling equipment. Submarine signalling was becoming obsolete as a form of communication, so by 1934 it had been removed. That same year, echo sounding equipment and a gyrocompass had been installed on the ship.

== Career ==
Morro Castle began her maiden voyage on August 23, 1930. She lived up to expectations by completing the 1,100+ mile southbound trip in just under fifty-nine hours, and the return trip took only fifty-eight hours. Over the next four years, Morro Castle and Oriente performed as workhorses, rarely out of service and, despite the worsening of the Great Depression, able to maintain a steady clientele. Their success was in part due to Prohibition, as such trips provided a relatively affordable and (more importantly) legal means for customers to drink alcoholic beverages. The Ward Line's reasonable rates attracted Cuban and American businessmen and older couples, making the ships a microcosm of America during the period.

=== Final voyage ===
==== Impending nor'easter ====
The final voyage of Morro Castle began in Havana on September 5, 1934. On the afternoon of September 6, as the ship paralleled the southeastern coast of the U.S., it began to encounter increasing clouds and wind. By the morning of September 7, the clouds had thickened and the winds had shifted to easterly, the first indication of a developing nor'easter. Throughout that day the winds increased and intermittent rains began, causing many to retire early to their berths.

==== Captain's death ====
Early that evening, Captain Robert Rennison Willmott had his dinner delivered to his quarters. Shortly thereafter, Willmott complained of stomach trouble and retired to his quarters for the evening. Sometime after this, it was discovered that the Captain had died. Command of the ship passed to the First Officer, William Warms, who was eating dinner with his fiancée Mary Cudworth at the time. The Captain's body was wrapped and taken to the cold storage, to preserve him until they reached their destination. During the overnight hours, the winds increased to over thirty miles per hour as Morro Castle plodded its way up the East Coast.

==== Fire ====
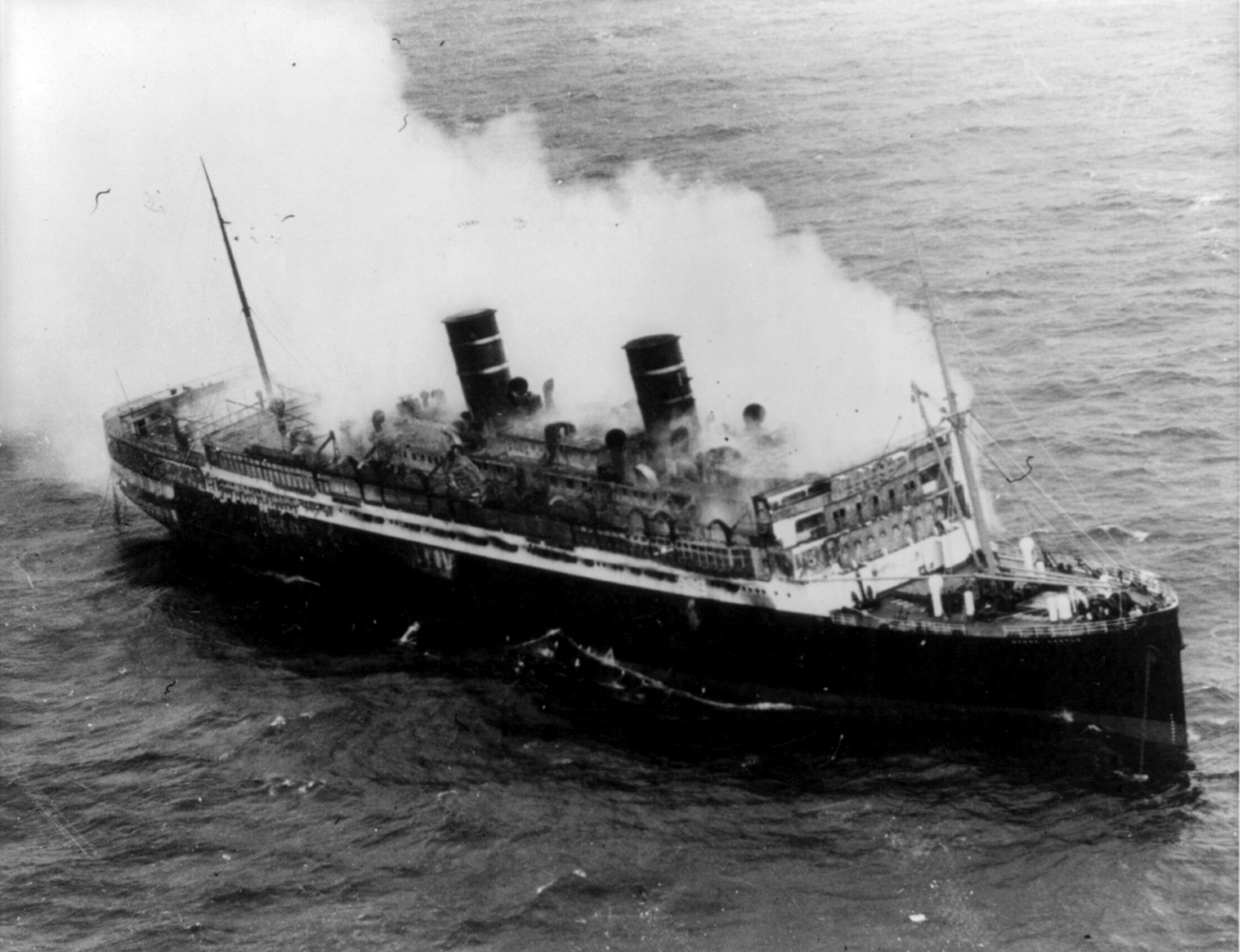
Morro Castle on fire, September 8, 1934

At around 2:50 a.m. on September 8, while Morro Castle was sailing around eight nautical miles off Long Beach Island, New Jersey, a fire was detected in a storage locker within the First Class Writing Room on B Deck. Within the next thirty minutes, the ship became engulfed in flames. As the fire grew in intensity, Acting Captain Warms attempted to beach the ship, but the growing need to launch lifeboats and abandon ship forced him to give up his plan.

Within twenty minutes of the fire's discovery (at about 3:10) the fire had burned through Morro Castle's main electrical cables, plunging the ship into darkness. As all power was lost, the radio stopped working, so only a single SOS signal was sent. At about the same time, the wheelhouse lost its ability to steer the ship, as the hydraulic lines were severed by the fire as well.

Cut off by the fire amidships, passengers tended to move toward the stern. Most crew members, on the other hand, moved to the forecastle. In many places, the deck boards were hot to the touch and breathing was difficult in the thick smoke. As conditions grew steadily worse, the decision became either "jump or burn" for many passengers. However, jumping into the water was problematic, as high winds churned up great waves that made swimming extremely difficult. Passengers and crew exhibited the full range of reactions to the disaster at hand. Some crew members were incredibly brave as they tried to fight the fire. Others tossed deck chairs and life rings overboard to provide persons in the water with makeshift flotation devices.

Only six of the ship's twelve lifeboats were launched: boats 1, 3, 5, 9, and 11 on the starboard side, and boat 10 on the port side. Although the combined capacity of these boats was 408, they carried only 85 people, most of whom were crew members. Many passengers died for lack of knowledge of how to use the life preservers. As they hit the water, life preservers knocked many persons unconscious, leading to subsequent death by drowning, or broke victims' necks from the impact, killing them instantly.

==== Rescue efforts at sea ====
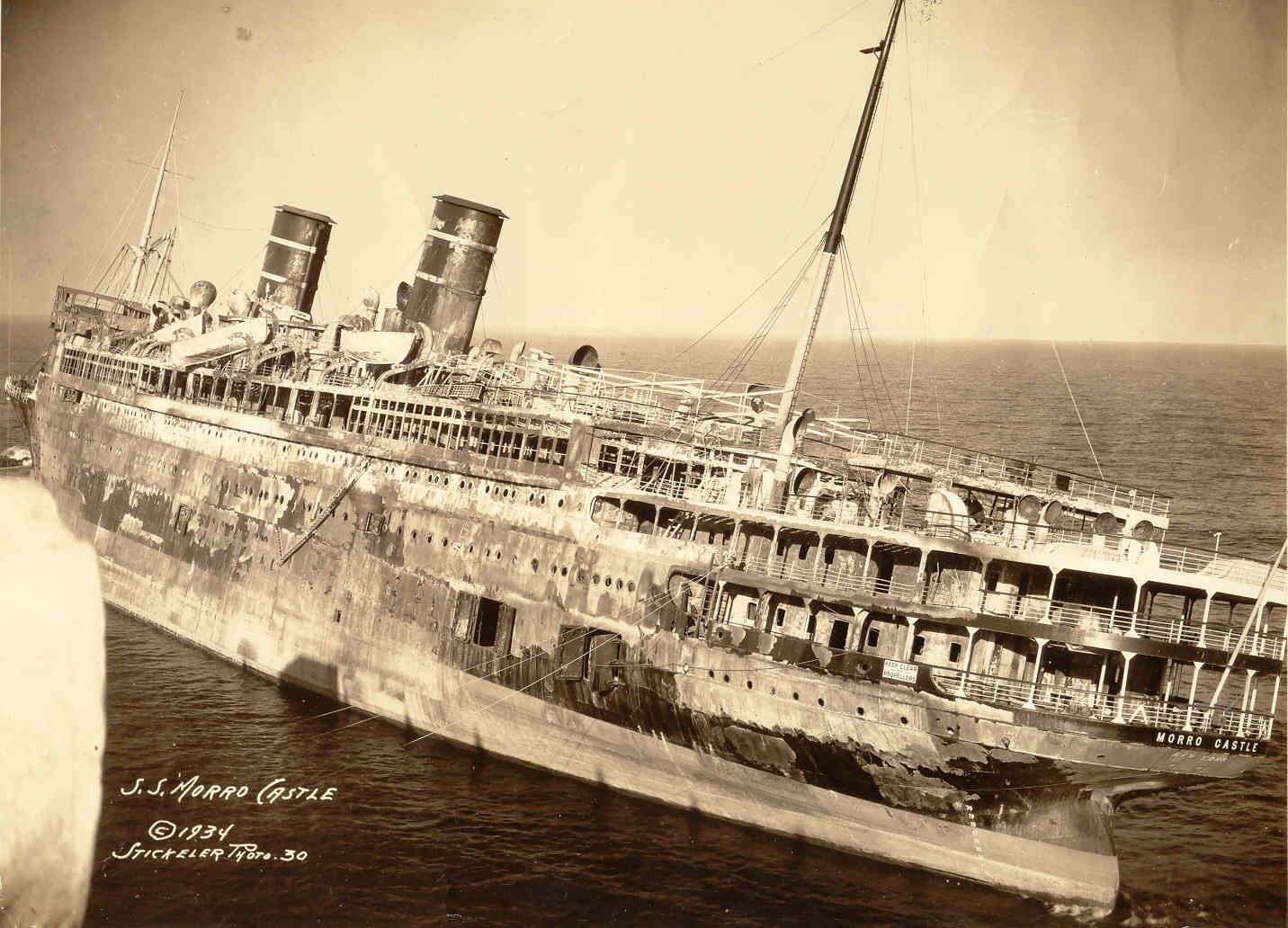
Morro Castle after the fire; photo taken from the seaward end of the Asbury Park Convention Hall pier, November 1934

First responders were slow to react. The first rescue ship to arrive on the scene was Andrea F. Luckenbach. Two other ships—Monarch of Bermuda and City of Savannah—were slow in taking action after receiving the SOS signal but eventually did arrive on the scene. The fourth ship to participate in the rescue operations was President Cleveland, which launched a motorboat that made a cursory circuit around Morro Castle and, upon seeing nobody in the water along her route, retrieved her motorboat and left the scene.

The United States Coast Guard vessels Tampa and Cahoone positioned themselves too far away to see the victims in the water and rendered little assistance. The Coast Guard's aerial station at Cape May, New Jersey, failed to send their float planes until local radio stations started reporting that dead bodies were washing ashore on New Jersey beaches, from Point Pleasant Beach to Spring Lake.

In time, additional small boats arrived on the scene. Large ocean swells presented a major problem, making it very difficult to see people in the water. A plane piloted by Harry Moore, governor of New Jersey and commander of the New Jersey Air National Guard, helped boats to find survivors and bodies by dipping its wings and dropping markers.

==== Recovery efforts on shore ====
As telephone communication and radio stations spread news of the disaster along the New Jersey coast, local citizens assembled on the coastline to assist the injured, retrieve the dead and try to unite families that had been scattered among different rescue boats that landed on the beaches. By mid-morning, Morro Castle was totally abandoned and its burning hull drifted ashore, coming to a stop late that afternoon in shallow water off Asbury Park, at almost the exact spot where the New Era had wrecked in 1854. Fires continued to smoulder on board for the next two days and, in the end, 137 passengers and crew (out of a total of 549) were lost.

Morro Castle was declared a total loss, and its charred hulk was finally towed away from the Asbury Park shoreline on March 14, 1935. According to one account, it later started settling by the stern and sank while being towed and had to be refloated. (Other accounts have it that the ship was towed without any issues). Regardless, it was towed to Gravesend Bay and then to Baltimore on March 29, 1935, where it was scrapped.

In the intervening months, because of its proximity to the Asbury Park Boardwalk and the adjacent Asbury Park Convention Hall pier, from which it was possible to wade out and touch the wreck with one's hands, the wreck was treated as a destination for sightseeing trips, complete with stamped penny souvenirs and postcards for sale.

== Factors contributing to the fire ==
The design of Morro Castle, the materials used in her construction, and questionable crew practices escalated the on-board fire to a roaring inferno that eventually destroyed the ship.

=== Construction materials ===
As far as the materials used in her construction were concerned, the elegant but highly flammable decor of Morro Castle—veneered wooden surfaces and glued ply paneling—helped the fire to spread quickly.

=== Ship's structure and lack of safety features ===
The structure of Morro Castle also created a number of problems. Although the ship had fire doors, there existed a wood-lined, six-inch opening between the wooden ceilings and the steel bulkheads which provided the fire with a flammable pathway that bypassed the fire doors, enabling it to spread.

Whereas the ship had electric sensors that could detect fires in any of the ship's staterooms, crew quarters, offices, cargo holds and engine room, there were no such detectors in the ship's lounges, dance hall, writing room, library, tea room or dining room. Although there were forty-two water hydrants on board, the system was designed with the assumption that no more than six would ever have to be used at any one time.

When the emergency aboard Morro Castle occurred, the crew opened virtually all working hydrants, dropping the water pressure to unusable levels everywhere. The ship's Lyle gun, which is designed to fire a line to another ship to facilitate passenger evacuation in an emergency, was stored over Morro Castle's writing room, which is where the fire originated. The Lyle gun exploded just before 3 a.m., further spreading the fire and breaking windows, thereby allowing the near gale force winds to enter the ship and fan the flames. Finally, fire alarms on the ship produced a "muffled, scarcely audible ring", according to passengers.

=== Crew practices and deficiencies ===
Crew practices and deficiencies added to the severity of the fire. According to surviving crewmen, painting the ship had been a common practice to keep it looking new and to keep crewmen busy. Unfortunately, the thick layers of paint that resulted from this practice made the ship more flammable and strips of paint broke off during the fire, helping to spread the flames. The storage locker in which the fire started held blankets that had been drycleaned with flammable fluids.

Although the ship had fire doors, their automatic trip wires (designed to close when a certain temperature was reached) had been disconnected. None of the crew thought to operate them manually at the time of the fire. That said, it is unlikely that that would have made much difference, as the six-inch opening between the wooden ceilings and the steel bulkheads would have allowed the flames to spread even if the fire doors had closed.

Many of the hose stations on the promenade deck had been recently deactivated in response to an incident about a month before, when a passenger slipped on a deck moistened by a leaking hose station and sued the Ward Line. Although regulations required that fire drills be held on each voyage, only the crew members participated. Captain Willmott did not require the passengers to attend the fire drills out of fear of inconveniencing them.

For quite some time after the discovery of the fire, the ship continued on its course and speed—pointed directly into the wind. This no doubt helped to fan the fire. Later, in their attempt to reach passengers in some suites, crewmen broke windows on several decks, allowing the high winds to enter the ship and hasten the fire's fury.

Because the wireless operators could not get a definitive answer from Acting Captain Warms, the SOS was not ordered until 3:18 and was not sent until 3:23. Within five minutes, the intense heat of the fire began to distort Morro Castle's signal. Shortly thereafter, emergency generators failed and transmissions ceased.

== Aftermath ==
=== Inquiries ===
In the inquiries that followed the disaster, there were criticisms of the response of Warms' handling of the ship, the crew's response to the fire and the delay in calling for assistance.

The inquiries concluded that there was no organized effort by the crew to fight and control the fire or close the fire doors. Additionally, the crew made no effort to take their regular fire stations. Most damning was the conclusion that, with a few notable exceptions, the crew made no effort to direct passengers to safe pathways to the boat deck. For many passengers, their only course of action was to lower themselves into the water or jump overboard. The few lifeboats that were launched carried primarily crewmen and no efforts were made by these boats to maneuver toward the ship's stern to pick up additional survivors. Warms never left the wheelhouse to determine the extent of damage and maintained the ship's bearing and full speed for some distance after the fire was known. As systems failed throughout the ship because of power loss, no effort was made to use the emergency steering gear or emergency lighting.

Warms, chief engineer Eban Abbott and Ward Line vice president Henry Cabaud were eventually indicted on various charges relating to the fire, including willful negligence; all three were convicted and sent to jail. However, an appeals court later overturned Warms' and Abbott's convictions, deciding that a fair amount of the blame could be attributed to the deceased Captain Willmott.

In the inquiry that followed the disaster, Chief Radio Operator George White Rogers was made out to be a hero because, having been unable to get a clear order from the bridge, he sent a distress call of his own accord amidst life-threatening conditions. However, suspicion was later directed at Rogers when he was convicted of attempting to murder a colleague in the Bayonne, New Jersey, police force with an incendiary device. Additionally, his crippled victim, Vincent "Bud" Doyle, spent the better part of his life attempting to prove that Rogers had set the Morro Castle fire. In 1954, Rogers was convicted of murdering a neighboring couple for money, and died three and a half years later in prison.

==== Liability claims ====
The New York Times reported the end of the inquiry on March 27, 1937, with an order by Federal Judge John C. Knox affixing liability at $890,000, an average of $2,225 per victim. About half the claims were for deaths. The order reportedly included agreement by 95% of the claimants. The order also barred further claims against the Ward Line and its subsidiary, the Agwi Navigation Company, operators of the vessel. Several months' work remained in deciding each claim individually by the lawyer members of the Morro Castle Committee. Damages were fixed under the Death on the High Seas Act.

==== Causes ====
Officially, the fire's cause was never determined. In the mid-1980s, HBO aired a televised dramatization of the fire in an episode of their Catastrophe series, titled "The Mystery of the Morro Castle". The dramatization starred John Goodman as George Rogers and blamed Rogers for causing the fire. In 2002, A&E produced a television documentary about the incident. Both the HBO dramatization and the A&E documentary reawakened speculation that the fire was actually arson committed by a crew member. Other theories included a short circuit in the wiring that passed through the rear of the locker, the spontaneous combustion of chemically treated blankets in the locker or an overheating of the ship's one functioning funnel, situated just aft of the locker.

William McFee, a well-known writer of sea stories who had served as an engineer on oil-fired steamers, wrote in 1949 that "if the burners were neglected... [the] long uptakes which lead from the furnaces to the funnel would become dangerously overheated", as he once found on another ship, whose "funnel was glowing red-hot just above the uptakes". Morro Castle's funnel was clad in flammable material where it passed through the passenger quarters, and several people had noticed smoke as early as midnight. The ship was making 19 knots against a 20-knot headwind and simply overheated, according to McFee, but the high loss of life was caused by the crew's incompetent handling of the emergency.

Renée Méndez Capote, a Cuban writer who was aboard Morro Castle when the tragedy happened, was trapped in her cabin as the ship became engulfed in flames but was rescued by crew members. Because of her corpulence, she had to be removed through a hatch. American steward Carol Prior gave Capote his flotation device, thereby saving her life. Upon her arrival in New York City, she was interviewed by the American press. Because she expressed sympathy with the Cuban communist party, Capote was accused of being a "communist agitator" who was responsible for destroying the ship. Capote later declared, “That fire is—undoubtedly—the worst memory I've ever had."

=== Burials ===
Some victims of the fire are buried in the Mount Prospect Cemetery in Neptune, New Jersey, along the coast.

=== Memorial ===
On September 8, 2009, the first and only memorial to the victims, rescuers and survivors of the Morro Castle disaster was dedicated on the south side of Convention Hall in Asbury Park, very near the spot where the burned-out hull of the ship finally came aground. The day marked the seventy-fifth anniversary of the disaster.

Morro Castle ship's bell is now at SUNY Maritime's Fort Schuyler.

=== Anchor ===
In September 2023, Morro Castle's five-ton Baldt anchor was recovered from the water in Point Pleasant Beach in New Jersey.

== In media and popular culture ==
=== In film and television ===
Despite the tragedy and mystery of the Morro Castle disaster, no film for theatrical distribution nor even a television movie was made of the story, excepting the aforementioned HBO dramatization and A&E documentary. Shortly after he was hired by Metro-Goldwyn-Mayer following his emigration from Germany to the United States in 1934, Fritz Lang collaborated with Hollywood scriptwriter Oliver H. P. Garrett on a screenplay about the disaster entitled Hell Afloat, but it was never filmed. However, there have been references to it:

- Movietone News Reel: Reel
- A fire aboard a ship making the New York-Cuba run, an evident allusion to the Morro Castle, is shown in the film Exclusive Story (1936).
- At the end of the Spencer Tracy film Dante's Inferno (1935), a gambling cruise ship (resembling the Morro Castle) is completely ablaze.
- In the film Boy Meets Girl (1938), James Cagney (in dictating a letter to Pat O'Brien regarding what a third person is supposed to be saying to his missing wife) says, "I did not go down on the Morro Castle!"
- In the early moments of the film, Doomed to Die (1940, one of six Monogram releases featuring the fictional Mr. Wong), film footage of the burning Morro Castle is shown, although for the film's plot it is referred as the Wentworth Castle.
- An exploitative mention is also made in the detective film The Man Who Wouldn't Die (1942): one suspect was assumed to have perished on this ship but survived, unbeknownst to another.
- The movie Moontide (1942) has a scene showing the main character ‘Bobo’ entering a hotel where he resides that’s named ‘Morro Castle’.
- The movie Minstrel Man (1944) features the fire and sinking of the Morro Castle.
- In the film The World Was His Jury (1958), Edmond O'Brien portrays an attorney defending a ship's first officer on trial for negligence after the ocean liner he has taken command of (following the sudden death of the original captain during the voyage) burns to a hulk off NY/NJ, killing a great many passengers. Most of the case's points closely mirror those of the Morro Castle.
- Newsreel footage of the disaster opens The Untouchables TV episode "The Underground Court", in which a fictitious character in the episode is an apparent survivor of the tragedy.
- The sinking was featured in an episode of Mysteries at the Museum (2013).
- The documentary The Cruise From Hell: The Burning of Morro Castle tells the story of the disaster. It explains the events leading up to it, relates the sequence of events during the fire, and describes the aftermath.

=== In music ===
- The first artists to remember the tragedy of the Morro Castle were the members of the Trio Matamoros of Santiago de Cuba, with the song "El desastre del Morro Castle" (1934).
- The Morro Castle disaster occurred when the musical Anything Goes, a comedy set aboard an ocean liner, was about to open. Under the circumstances, the producers decided that going ahead would be in bad taste, and cancelled the opening. The musical was then subjected to several rewrites before finally opening later in 1934.
- In 1970, the West Coast music critic Philip Elwood described the early Bruce Springsteen-led, and Asbury Park-based, Steel Mill as "the first big thing that's happened to Asbury Park since the good ship Morro Castle burned to the waterline of that Jersey beach in '34".

=== In literature ===
- The ship is referenced in Samuel Beckett's novel Murphy, published in 1938.
- The ship provided inspiration for William Burroughs' "Twilight's Last Gleamings", a version of which was published in his Nova Express.
- The ship is referenced in William H. Gass’s novel The Tunnel.
- The ship is the main focal point in Chanel Cleeton’s novel The Cuban Heiress, published in 2023.
- The ship disaster is covered in the article "Pleasure Cruise for 137 Corpses" "Sheldon Lord" (Lawrence Block) published in REAL MEN November 1958.
- Author, Brian Hicks wrote a highly regarded history of the disaster in When The Dancing Stopped: The Real Story of the Morro Castle Disaster and Its Deadly Wake Free Press, 2008

=== In gaming ===
- The ship is featured in the game Ship Explorer, developed by Turbine Room Studio and published by Seabank Digital Productions. Users can explore the ship at sea in 1933 and on fire on 8 September 1934.

== See also ==
- PS General Slocum
- SS Normandie
- SS Noronic
- RMS Queen Elizabeth
- MS Prinsendam
- Herbert Saffir—a survivor of the Morro Castle
- Star Princess (2001)
- SS Yarmouth Castle
- RMS Titanic
- SS Edmund Fitzgerald
