= Charles Stafford (anthropologist) =

Charles Stafford FBA (born 6 November 1956) is Professor of Anthropology at the London School of Economics; he is also one of the co-founders of the LSE’s Programme in Culture & Cognition. Stafford specialises in the social anthropology of China and Taiwan. His research projects and scholarly publications have focused primarily on child development, learning, schooling, kinship, religion and the psychology of economic life. In July 2018 he was elected Fellow of the British Academy (FBA).

== Research ==
Stafford’s first major fieldwork project was conducted in the late 1980s in a Taiwanese fishing community where he examined, among other things, the sometimes tense relationship between nationalist schooling and local popular culture.

In the early 1990s he began conducting research in northeastern mainland China on issues surrounding kinship, selfhood and historical consciousness. Much of his focus here was on the rituals and practices of “separation and reunion” which help structure the flow of social life in rural Chinese communities.

Since 2000, Stafford has been working on themes related to economic psychology; he has received grants from the Economic and Social Research Council and the British Academy for his work in this area.

== Publications ==
- Separation and Reunion in Modern China, Cambridge University Press (2000) ISBN 0-521-78017-9
- (editor) Living with Separation in China: Anthropological Accounts, Routledge (2003) ISBN 0-415-30571-3
- The Roads of Chinese Childhood: Learning and Identification in Angang, Cambridge University Press (2006) ISBN 0-521-02656-3
- (editor with Rita Astuti & Jonathan Parry) Questions of Anthropology, Bloomsbury (2007) ISBN 1-8452-0748-3
- (editor) Ordinary Ethics in China, Bloomsbury (2013) ISBN 0-8578-5460-7
