= Charles A. Stafford =

Charles Arthur Stafford
- Born: 8 Dec 1908; Kemmerer Lincoln, Wyoming
- Died: 3 March 1942 near Broome, Australia
- Military career
- Allegiance: United States of America
- Branch: United States Army
- Rank: Captain
- Conflicts: World War II: Battle of Java
- Awards: Silver Star; Purple Heart

Charles Arthur Stafford (8 December 1908 - March 3, 1942) was a Captain and physician in the Medical Corps of the United States Army during World War II. Stafford was posthumously awarded the Silver Star for his actions in the Battle of Java.

== Early life ==
Stafford was born 8 December 1908 in Kemmerer, Lincoln, Wyoming, the son of Dr. Charles Duncan Stafford (1871–1938) and Mary Elizabeth (Mabel) Sellon (1886–1972). He was the oldest of three children, with two younger sisters: Mary Marguerite and Jacqueline Maurice (Penny). He attended Kemmerer High School and Kemper Military College before enrolling in Rush Medical College in Chicago, Illinois. On 14 August 1940, he married Kathryn Louise Froscher (1910–2000). They had one child, Mildred Ann who was born about 1941. Kathryn would eventually remarry after Stafford's death, to John Hall.

== Military career ==
Stafford entered the Army in Wyoming, but was listed as being from Hinsdale, Illinois.

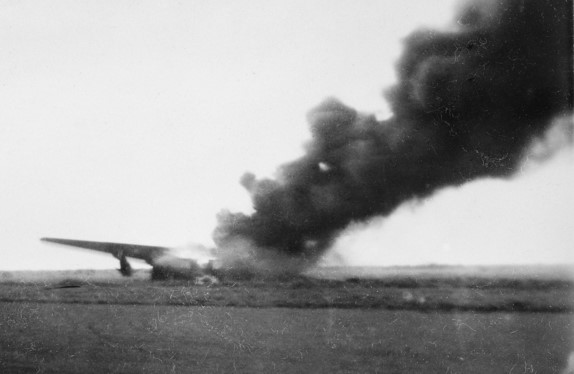
A USAAF B-24 Liberator is seen on fire at Broome following the Japanese attack on March 3, 1942. Stafford's B-24 was downed in the same attack.

Stafford was the flight surgeon of the 9th squadron of the 7th Bombardment Wing, stationed at Djokjakarta in early February 1942, when 22 sailors from U.S. Navy cruisers Houston and Marblehead wounded in the Battle of Makassar Strait arrived. Stafford and local Dutch doctors worked late in the night to treat the sailors, most of whom had suffered severe burns. When the Japanese invaded Java on February 28, 1942, Stafford was instrumental in getting the sailors evacuated on the freighter Abbekerk.

In early March 1942 the Allied forces were evacuating civilians and wounded from Java through Broome, Western Australia, and on to Perth. Fearing a Japanese air attack, airplanes carrying evacuees were ordered to take off from Broome by 10:00 on March 3, 1942. At almost exactly that time, B-24 Liberator Arabian Nights (#40-2370) of the 19th Bombardment Group (Heavy), carrying Stafford and 33 wounded, took off from Broome for Perth. As the plane climbed through 300 to 400 feet (91 to 122 m), a flight of six Japanese A6M Zero fighter planes attacked Broome. Imperial Japanese Navy Warrant Officer Osamu Kudo was credited with shooting down Arabian Nights, which crashed 7 miles (11 km) offshore. Despite his efforts to save the wounded men, Stafford and all but two enlisted men — one of whom died after the arduous swim back to land — were killed in the crash and sinking of the aircraft.

Stafford's remains were unrecoverable, but he was later memorialized on the Tablets of the Missing at the Manila American Cemetery and Memorial in the Philippines.

== Honors and awards ==
For his "devotion to duty and coolness under fire" in caring for the wounded sailors from Houston and Marblehead, Stafford was posthumously awarded the Silver Star on July 18, 1942. Stafford was also awarded the Purple Heart.

== Namesake ==
In 1944, the U.S. Army hospital ship Charles A. Stafford was named in his honor.
