= List of shipwrecks in August 1868 =

The list of shipwrecks in August 1868 includes ships sunk, foundered, grounded, or otherwise lost during August 1868.

== 1 August ==
List of shipwrecks: 1 August 1868
Ship	State	Description
Orient	Canada	The ship was wrecked at Dover, Nova Scotia. Her crew were rescued. She was on a voyage from Providence, Rhode Island, United States to Glace Bay, Nova Scotia.

== 2 August ==
List of shipwrecks: 2 August 1868
Ship	State	Description
HMS Argus	Royal Navy	The ship ran aground off "Howtha Island", China. Subsequently refloated, repaired and returned to service.

== 3 August ==
List of shipwrecks: 3 August 1868
Ship	State	Description
Pomona	United Kingdom	The ship was driven ashore and wrecked at Fox River, Nova Scotia, Canada. She was on a voyage from Quebec City, Canada to Liverpool, Lancashire. She had been refloated by 14 August and resumed her voyage.

== 4 August ==
List of shipwrecks: 4 August 1868
Ship	State	Description
China Packet	United Kingdom	The brig was wrecked on the south coast of Romblon, Spanish East Indies. All on board were rescued.
Cuban	United Kingdom	The ship caught fire at Havana, Cuba and was scuttled. She was refloated the next day.

== 5 August ==
List of shipwrecks: 5 August 1868
Ship	State	Description
Empire Queen	United Kingdom	The ship ran aground on the Arklow Bank, in the Irish Sea off the coast of County Wicklow. All 22 people on board were taken off by the Arklow and Courtown Lifeboats. She was on a voyage from Quebec City, Canada to Dublin.

== 6 August ==
List of shipwrecks: 6 August 1868
Ship	State	Description
Filomena	United Kingdom	The ship was wrecked at Montevideo, Uruguay. Her crew were rescued. She was on a voyage from Cardiff, Glamorgan to Montevideo.
HMS Lapwing	Royal Navy	The Plover-class gunvessel ran aground on Patrick's Rock, off Killala, County Mayo. Subsequently refloated, repaired and returned to service.

== 7 August ==
List of shipwrecks: 7 August 1868
Ship	State	Description
Brian Boiroimhe	United Kingdom	The ship foundered in the Atlantic Ocean with the loss of fifteen of her eighteen crew. Two survivors were rescued by Ronocham (United Kingdom); her captain was rescued by Colonist (United Kingdom). Brian Boiroihme was on a voyage from Dublin to Quebec City, Canada.

== 8 August ==
List of shipwrecks: 8 August 1868
Ship	State	Description
Charles	United Kingdom	The ship was beached at Hubberston, Pembrokeshire. She was on a voyage from Cardiff, Glamorgan to Cork.
Maria and Fanny	United Kingdom	The ship was wrecked at "Kennavara", Tiree, Outer Hebrides with the loss of two of her crew. She was on a voyage from Ayr to Limerick.
Northwick	United Kingdom	The ship was driven ashore at Östergarn, Sweden. She was on a voyage from Kronstadt, Russia to London.
Pantomime	(United Kingdom of Great Britain and Ireland) Royal Yacht Squadron	The yacht ran aground off Lepe, Hampshire. She was refloated with assistance from Prince Consort (United Kingdom).
Sarah A. Bell	United Kingdom	The ship was driven ashore near "Ostby", on the east coast of Öland, Sweden. She was on a voyage from Riga, Russia to Liverpool, Lancashire. She was refloated on 12 August and taken into Kalmar, Sweden for repairs.

== 9 August ==
List of shipwrecks: 9 August 1868
Ship	State	Description
Providence	United Kingdom	The ship departed from Curaçao for Liverpool, Lancashire. No further trace, presumed foundered with the loss of all hands.
Sisters	United Kingdom	The ship sprang a leak and sank in the Bristol Channel off Flat Holm. Her crew were rescued. She was on a voyage from Newport, Monmouthshire to Bridgwater, Somerset.
Toronto	United Kingdom	The barque was destroyed by fire off Adra, Spain. Her ten crew were rescued by the barque Tressigen ( Grand Duchy of Mecklenburg-Schwerin). Toronto was on a voyage from Glasgow, Renfrewshire to Málaga, Spain.

== 10 August ==
List of shipwrecks: 10 August 1868
Ship	State	Description
Cleopatra	United Kingdom	The steamship ran aground in the Dardanelles. She was on a voyage from Odesa, Russia to an English port. She was refloated.
Samson	United Kingdom	The steamship was driven ashore in Sara Sigler Bay. She was on a voyage from London to Galaţi, Ottoman Empire.

== 11 August ==
List of shipwrecks: 11 August 1868
Ship	State	Description
Annie	(United Kingdom of Great Britain and Ireland) New Zealand	The 16-ton schooner foundered near Cape Kidnappers during a gale.
Ben Muich Dhu	United Kingdom	The ship was driven ashore at Ronehamn, Gotland, Sweden. She was on a voyage from Kronstadt, Russia to London. She was later refloated and resumed her voyage.
Blue Jacket	United Kingdom	The fishing smack foundered in Dublin Bay with the loss of all seven crew.
Bremensis	United Kingdom	The ship was wrecked on Ascension Island. Her crew survived. She was on a voyage from Bombay, India to Liverpool, Lancashire.
Carrier	United Kingdom	The ship foundered off Roses, Spain. She was on a voyage from London to Cette, Hérault. France.
Gentle Annie	United Kingdom	The ship ran aground and was wrecked at Lagos, Africa. Her crew were rescued. She was on a voyage from Liverpool to Lagos.
Ruffins and Gabriel	United Kingdom	The ship was wrecked on Hiiumaa, Russia. Her crew were rescued. She was on a voyage from Sunderland, County Durham to Narva, Russia.

== 12 August ==
List of shipwrecks: 12 August 1868
Ship	State	Description
Edwin and Sarah	United Kingdom	The ketch ran aground on the Corton Sands, in the North Sea off the coast of Suffolk. She was on a voyage from London to "Nissenifiord". She was refloated and taken into Great Yarmouth, Norfolk in a leaky condition.
Gitana	United Kingdom	The schooner ran aground on the Nore.
Julie	Russia	The galleas was driven ashore and wrecked on Saaremaa. She was on a voyage from Saint Petersburg to Riga.
Mary Dawson	United Kingdom	The smack was wrecked near Portmahomack, Ross-shire. Her crew were rescued. She was on a voyage from Buckie, Moray to Portmahomack.
Ocean Child	United Kingdom	The schooner struck the wreck of Lady Alice (United Kingdom) and foundered off Greenisland, County Antrim. Her crew survived. She was on a voyage from Glasgow, Renfrewshire to Belfast, County Antrim.

== 13 August ==
List of shipwrecks: 13 August 1868
Ship	State	Description
BAP América	Peruvian Navy	BAP América. 1868 Arica earthquake: The steam corvette was lost when struck by the tsunamis generated by an earthquake at Arica, Peru. 33, or 85, of her crew were killed.
America	United Kingdom	1868 Arica earthquake: The ship was damaged at Lima, Peru.
Bill Point	United Kingdom	The ship was driven ashore and wrecked on Saaremaa, Russia. Her crew were rescued. She was on a voyage from Newcastle upon Tyne, Northumberland to Kronstadt, Russia.
Black Eagle	United States	1868 Arica earthquake: The ship was wrecked at Coquimbo, Chile.
Canton	France	1868 Arica earthquake: The ship was driven ashore at Chala, Peru then refloated.
Chañarcillo	United Kingdom	1868 Arica earthquake: The barque was wrecked at Arica with the loss of eight of her crew.
Chancellor	United Kingdom	1868 Arica earthquake: The barque was wrecked at Arica with the loss of half her crew.
Condor	United States	1868 Arica earthquake: The barque was wrecked at Mejillones, Chile. Her crew were rescued.
Delhi	United Kingdom	1868 Arica earthquake: The ship was wrecked at Mejillones.
Delia	United Kingdom	1868 Arica earthquake: The ship was damaged wrecked at Mejillones.
Dona Henrietta	United Kingdom	1868 Arica earthquake: The barque was wrecked at Junín, Peru. Her crew were rescued.
Don Enrique	Chile	1868 Arica earthquake: The ship was lost at or near Iquique.
Eastern Empire	United Kingdom	1868 Arica earthquake: The ship was severely damaged at Junín.
Eduardo	Peru	1868 Arica earthquake: The ship was wrecked in the Chincha Islands.
Edward	France	1868 Arica earthquake: The barque was wrecked at Arica.
Edwards	United Kingdom	1868 Arica earthquake: The ship was wrecked in the Chincha Islands.
USS Fredonia	United States Navy	1868 Arica earthquake: While the storeship, a bark, was in port at Arica, an earthquake struck which generated several tsunamis that hit Fredonia. The last tsunami broke Fredonia apart, killing 27 of her 32 crew.
Gambeta	United Kingdom	1868 Arica earthquake: The ship was wrecked at Ilo, Peru with the loss of all hands.
Henrietta	United Kingdom	1868 Arica earthquake: The ship was wrecked at Mejillones.
Kate Freeman	United States	The ship was wrecked on West Caicos, Caicos Islands. Her crew were rescued. She was on a voyage from Boston, Massachusetts to Colón, United States of Colombia.
Leopold II	Prussia	1868 Arica earthquake: The barque was wrecked at Junín.
Manhattan	United States	1868 Arica earthquake: The ship was wrecked at Coquimbo.
Ninita	Chile	1868 Arica earthquake: The sloop was wrecked at Ilo with the loss of all hands.
Oaklands	United Kingdom	1868 Arica earthquake: The barque collided with Chilli (France) and sank at Caldera, Chile. Two steamboats which formed part of her cargo were subsequently salvaged.
Oceanica	United Kingdom	1868 Arica earthquake: The ship was wrecked at Junín.
Plasa	United Kingdom	1868 Arica earthquake: The ship was damaged at Lima.
USS Powhatan	United States Navy	1868 Arica earthquake: The frigate was damaged at Callao, Peru.
Regalon	Chile	1868 Arica earthquake: The schooner was wrecked at Arica.
Resolute	United Kingdom	1868 Arica earthquake: The ship was damaged at Junín.
Retana	United Kingdom	1868 Arica earthquake: The ship was damaged at Lima.
Rosarivera	United States	1868 Arica earthquake: The ship was wrecked in the Chincha Islands.
Rose Stand	United Kingdom	1868 Arica earthquake: The ship was damaged at Lima.
Royal Oak	United Kingdom	1868 Arica earthquake: The ship was damaged at Junín.
Sophie	United Kingdom	The ship departed from "Saint Thomas Island", Africa for Liverpool, Lancashire. No further trace, presumed foundered with the loss of all hands.
Southern Ocean	United Kingdom	1868 Arica earthquake: The ship was severely damaged at Junín. She was placed under repair.
True Briton	United Kingdom	1868 Arica earthquake: The ship was damaged at Lima.
USS Wateree	United States Navy	Wateree 1868 Arica earthquake: While the sidewheel gunboat was in port at Arica, an earthquake struck which generated several tsunamis that hit Wateree. The last tsunami broke Wateree's anchor chains and drove her ashore almost 500 yards (457 metres) inland from the normal high-water mark with the loss of a crew member.
Unnamed	United States	1868 Arica earthquake: The barque sank at Arica with the loss of all hands.
Unnamed	Chile	1868 Arica earthquake: The schooner was wrecked at Ilo with the loss of all hands.

== 14 August ==
List of shipwrecks: 14 August 1868
Ship	State	Description
Annie Jane	United Kingdom	The schooner was beached at Cahore, County Wexford with assistance from the Cahore Lifeboat.
Garibaldi	United Kingdom	The tug collided with the steamship Lord Aberdour (United Kingdom) and sank at Leith, Lothian. Her crew were rescued.
Mary Ann	United Kingdom	The sloop was wrecked near Wormiston, Fife. She was on a voyage from Peterhead, Aberdeenshire to Burntisland, Fife.
Ziliah	United Kingdom	The ship caught fire at Smyrna, Ottoman Empire and was scuttled.

== 15 August ==
List of shipwrecks: 15 August 1868
Ship	State	Description
Annie Brown	(United Kingdom of Great Britain and Ireland) New Zealand	The schooner was driven against the quayside at Lyttelton by a tsunami and was damaged.
Durham	United Kingdom	The ship was wrecked at Cape St. Angles. She was on a voyage from Leith, Lothian, to Kronstadt, Russia.
Emanuel	United States	The ship ran aground at Ålsgårde, Denmark. She was on a voyage from New York to Kronstadt.
John Knox	(United Kingdom of Great Britain and Ireland) New Zealand	The barque was driven against the quayside at Lyttelton by a tsunami and was damaged.

== 16 August ==
List of shipwrecks: 16 August 1868
Ship	State	Description
Joseph Simes	United Kingdom	The steamship ran aground on the London Chest, in the Baltic Sea.

== 17 August ==
List of shipwrecks: 17 August 1868
Ship	State	Description
Favourite	United Kingdom	The bumboat capsized and sank in the English Channel off Worbarrow Bay, Dorset with the loss of a passenger (her two crew were saved by another bumboat).
Reliance	United Kingdom	The ship ran aground on the Herd Sand, in the North Sea off the coast of County Durham. She was on a voyage from South Shields, County Durham to London. She was refloated and towed back to South Shields.
River Tay	United Kingdom	The whaler, a steamship, sprang a leak and foundered off the coast of Greenland. Her crew were rescued.
Telegraph	United Kingdom	The schooner collided with the steamship Setubal (United Kingdom) and sank in the North Sea 40 nautical miles (74 km) off Lowestoft, Suffolk. Her crew were rescued by Setubal.

== 18 August ==
List of shipwrecks: 18 August 1868
Ship	State	Description
Bon Aventure	France	The lugger was abandoned at sea. Her five crew were rescued by St. Laurent (France). Bon Aventure was on a voyage from Dunkirk, Nord to Lorient, Morbihan, of from Saint-Malo, Ille-et-Vilaine to Llanelly, Glamorgan, United Kingdom.
Colombo	France	The barque was driven ashore at Winterton-on-Sea, Norfolk, United Kingdom. She was refloated and taken into Great Yarmouth, Norfolk in a leaky condition.
Corialan	France	The barque ran aground on the Haisborough Sands, in the North Sea off the coast of Norfolk. She was on a voyage from Christiania, Norway to Rochefort, Charente-Inférieure.
Janet Pitblade	United Kingdom	The ship was driven ashore at "Leskar".
John and Barbara	United Kingdom	The ship departed from Crail, Fife for Newcastle upon Tyne, Northumberland. No further trace, presumed foundered with the loss of all hands.
La Plata	United Kingdom	The steamship sank off Flamborough Head, Yorkshire. Her crew survived. She was on a voyage from Middlesbrough, Yorkshire to Rotterdam, South Holland, Netherlands.
Logan	United Kingdom	The barque sprang a leak and was abandoned 50 nautical miles (93 km) north by west of the Longships, Cornwall. Her fifteen crew were rescued by Pet (United Kingdom). She foundered 6 nautical miles (11 km) north east of the Seven Stones Reef, Cornwall on 20 August.
Robina	United Kingdom	The brig was run down and sunk 20 nautical miles (37 km) off the mouth of the Humber by the steamship Thomas Lea (United Kingdom). Her crew were rescued by Thomas Lea. Robina was on a voyage from Newcastle upon Tyne, Northumberland to Shoreham-by-Sea, Sussex.
Unnamed	France	The derelict lugger was driven ashore and wrecked at the Godrevy Lighthouse, Cornwall.

== 19 August ==
List of shipwrecks: 19 August 1868
Ship	State	Description
Alexandria	United States	The tug caught fire and was destroyed at City Point, Virginia.
Anderida	United Kingdom	The schooner collided with the barque No. 2 (United Kingdom) and sank 8 nautical miles (15 km) off Youghal, County Cork. Two of her three crew were rescued by No. 2.
Blue Bell	United Kingdom	The paddle tug was run into by Childers (United Kingdom) when that ship was launched at Pallion, County Durham and sank. Her crew were rescued.
Boxer	United Kingdom	The ship sank in the North Sea. Her crew were rescued by Isabella (United Kingdom). Boxer was on a voyage from Liverpool, Lancashire to Riga, Russian Empire.
Craigowrie	United Kingdom	The ship was driven ashore and wrecked at "Port Leven", Anglesey. Three of her crew were reported missing. She was on a voyage from Liverpool to Cardiff, Glamorgan.
Frances	United Kingdom	The ship departed from Demerara, British Guiana for Saint John's, Newfoundland Colony. No further trace, presumed foundered with the loss of all hands.
Gebent	United Kingdom	The sloop was wrecked at Whitby, Yorkshire. She was on a voyage from Whitby to Newcastle upon Tyne, Northumberland.
Happy Return	United Kingdom	The schooner was beached at Fécamp, Seine-Inférieure in a sinking condition. She was on a voyage from Newcastle upon Tyne, Northumberland to Caen, Calvados, France.
Industry	United Kingdom	The ship sank in the River Taff. She was on a voyage from Minehead, Somerset to Cardiff, Glamorgan.
John Wishart	United Kingdom	The ship was abandoned at Harlyn, Cornwall. She was on a voyage from Clare to Cardiff, Glamorgan.
Royal Family	United Kingdom	The ship was wrecked on the Rufero Reef, in the Maldive Islands. Her crew were rescued. She was on a voyage from Aden to the Chincha Islands.
Selma	Hamburg	The ship was wrecked at Amherst, Burma. Her crew were rescued. She was on a voyage from Moulmein, Burma to a British port.
Taranaki	(United Kingdom of Great Britain and Ireland) New Zealand	The steamship sank in the Tory Channel. She was later refloated and towed into Wellington, where she arrived on 1 October 1869.

== 20 August ==
List of shipwrecks: 20 August 1868
Ship	State	Description
Araxes	United Kingdom	The steamship ran aground at Cape Skagen, on the coast of Jutland. She was on a voyage from the River Tyne to Kronstadt, Russia. She was refloated the same day and resumed her voyage without material damage.
Cardenas	United Kingdom	The barque was driven ashore. She was on a voyage from Alloa, Clackmannanshire to Bolderāja, Russia. She was refloated with the assistance of a steamship and taken into Lysekil, Norway for repairs.
Earl of Wemyss	United Kingdom	The ship ran aground on the Shipwash Sand, in the North Sea off the coast of Suffolk. She was on a voyage from Huelva, Spain to Newcastle upon Tyne, Northumberland. She was refloated with the assistance of two smacks and a boat and taken into Harwich, Essex in a leaky condition.
Eliza	United Kingdom	The sloop was driven ashore at Grainthorpe, Lincolnshire. She was on a voyage from "Headby" to Louth, Lincolnshire.
Ida Elvira	United Kingdom	The ship was wrecked at Mossoró, Brazil. She was on a voyage from Mossoró to London.
Lightning	United Kingdom	The ship departed from Hong Kong for Calcutta, India. No further trace, presumed foundered with the loss of all hands.
Recompense	United Kingdom	The lugger was driven ashore at Wells-next-the-Sea, Norfolk.

== 21 August ==
List of shipwrecks: 21 August 1868
Ship	State	Description
Justicia	United Kingdom	The steamship was driven ashore at "Swanort", Prussia. She was on a voyage from Riga, Russia to London.
Sir Robert Peel	United Kingdom	The steamship collided with the steamship Pfeil (Flag unknown) and was beached at Dunkirk, Nord. She was on a voyage from Dunkirk to London.
Spinner	United Kingdom	The brig ran aground on the Sizewell Bank, in the North Sea off the coast of Suffolk, after losing both anchors and sails. She was on a voyage from Kronstadt, Russia to London with oats. She was refloated on 25 August and taken into Lowestoft, Suffolk in a leaky condition.

== 22 August ==
List of shipwrecks: 22 August 1868
Ship	State	Description
Albion	United Kingdom	The brig foundered in the English Channel 4 nautical miles (7.4 km) south east of Eastbourne, Sussex with the loss of nine of the ten people on board. She was on a voyage from South Shields, County Durham to Portsmouth, Hampshire.
Aretas	United Kingdom	The schooner foundered in the Thames Estuary off Whitstable, Kent. All on board were rescued. She was on a voyage from Portland, Dorset to London.
Bessie Bent	United Kingdom	The ship was driven ashore near Brandon, County Kerry. Her crew were rescued. She was on a voyage from Tralee to Cahersiveen and Valencia Island, County Cork.
Caledonia	United Kingdom	The ship was wrecked in Liverpool Bay. Her crew were rescued.
Caroline	United Kingdom	The ship was driven ashore and severely damaged 5 nautical miles (9.3 km) south of Duncannon, County Wexford. She was on a voyage from Newport, Monmouthshire to "Rosscaberry". She had been refloated by 30 August.
C. C. Colgate	United States	The schooner was wrecked off Hoylake, Cheshire, United Kingdom with the loss of all hands. She was on a voyage from Liverpool to New York.
Commerce	United Kingdom	The ship was driven ashore at "Aberbeach". She was on a voyage from Pentewan, Glamorgan to Fleetwood, Lancashire.
De Jex	United Kingdom	The barque foundered in Liverpool Bay with the loss of all hands. She was on a voyage from Liverpool to the Brass River, Africa.
Dove	United Kingdom	The yacht was driven ashore and wrecked in Llandudno Bay.
Ellen Ann, and Peregrine	United Kingdom	The ships collided off Towyn Caernarfonshire and both sank. The crew of Peregrine were rescued.
Ellen Gwenillan	United Kingdom	The ship was wrecked on the Marhoes Sand, off the coast of Pembrokeshire. Her crew were rescued.
Emily Ann	United Kingdom	The schooner was abandoned off Tenby, Pembrokeshire. Her crew were rescued by the Tenby Lifeboat.
Falcon	United Kingdom	The steamship ran aground on the Pardas Rocks, off Cape Finisterre, Spain and was wrecked. Her crew were rescued. She was on a voyage from Constantinople, Ottoman Empire to Falmouth, Cornwall.
Fancy	United Kingdom	The sloop foundered off the Runnel Stone, Cornwall. Her crew were rescued. She was on a voyage from Charlestown, Cornwall to Runcorn, Cheshire.
Fanny	United Kingdom	The ship was abandoned 40 nautical miles (74 km) south west of The Lizard, Cornwall. Her crew were rescued by the barque Maraquita (Italy). Fanny was on a voyage from Llanelly to La Rochelle, Charente-Inférieure, France.
Favourite	United Kingdom	The full-rigged ship foundered in the Irish Sea off Arklow, County Wicklow with the loss of all hands. She was on a voyage from Liverpool to New Orleans, Louisiana, United States.
George Canning	United Kingdom	The ship was driven ashore and wrecked Northam, Devon. Her crew were rescued. She was on a voyage from Portmadoc, Caernarfonshire to Shoreham-by-Sea, Sussex.
Gloriana	United Kingdom	The yacht was driven ashore and wrecked in Torbay. All three people on board were rescued.
Helena Anna	United Kingdom	The brigantine foundered in Carmarthen Bay. Her crew were rescued by the Tenby Lifeboat.
Holmes	United Kingdom	The barque was abandoned off Lynton, Devon with the loss of twelve of her sixteen crew.
Jane Elkin	(United Kingdom of Great Britain and Ireland) New Zealand	The 28-ton ketch ran aground and was wrecked on a spit at the mouth of the Grey River.
Jens Brande	United Kingdom	The ship was driven ashored on the coast of Somerset. She was on a voyage from Saint John, New Brunswick, Canada to Penarth, Glamorgan. She was refloated the next day and taken into Bristol, Gloucestershire.
Jules Joséphine	France	The ship was wrecked on the Doom Bar. Her four crew were rescued by the Padstow Lifeboat Albert Edward ( Royal National Lifeboat Institution). Jules Josephine was on a voyage from Llanelly, Glamorgan to Rochester, Kent, United Kingdom or La Rochelle, Charente-Inférieure.
Magdala	United Kingdom	The ship was driven ashore at Leasowe, Cheshire. Her crew were rescued. She was on a voyage from Liverpool, Lancashire to Charleston, South Carolina, United States. She was refloated on 1 September and towed into Liverpool.
Maid	United Kingdom	The ship was driven ashore. She was on a voyage from Saint John, New Brunswick, Canada to Liverpool. She was refloated on 24 August and taken into Liverpool.
Mariner	United Kingdom	The schooner foundered in Liverpool Bay. A boat washed up in the Hilbre Islands, Cheshire. She was on a voyage from Preston, Lancashire to Wexford.
Mary Anne	United Kingdom	The barque was driven ashore at Queenstown, County Cork.
Nameless	United Kingdom	The brigantine was abandoned off Tenby. Her crew were rescued by the Tenby Lifeboat.
Neptune	United Kingdom	The schooner was wrecked on the East Hoyle Bank, in Liverpool Bay with the loss of all eight crew. The Hoylake Lifeboat attended. She was on a voyage from Liverpool to Old Calabar, Africa.
Penelly	United Kingdom	The ship was driven ashore and wrecked at Bude, Cornwall. Her three crew were rescued by rocket apparatus. She was on a voyage from Dartmouth, Devon to Cardiff, Glamorgan.
Peregrine	United Kingdom	The brigantine was abandoned off Tenby. Her crew were rescued by the Tenby Lifeboat.
Saraband	United Kingdom	The schooner was driven ashore in Llandudno Bay. She was refloated and taken into the Menai Strait.
Sarah Pringle	United Kingdom	The schooner was abandoned off Tenby. Her crew were rescued by the Tenby Lifeboat She was on a voyage from Newport, Monmouthshire to Liverpool, Lancashire. She was taken into Llanelly, Glamorgan in a derelict condition on 25 August.
Souvenir	United Kingdom	The ship was driven ashore at Cardiff, Glamorgan. She was refloated.
Swift	United Kingdom	The ship was driven ashore on "Schellhoek". She was on a voyage from Newcastle upon Tyne, Northumberland to Amsterdam, North Holland, Netherlands. She was refloated and towed into Amsterdam.
Tara	United Kingdom	The ship was wrecked on the Formby Spit, in Liverpool Bay with the loss of 23 of her 24 crew. Her captain was rescued by Countess of Galloway (United Kingdom) but subsequently died. Tara was on a voyage from Liverpool to Quebec City, Province of Canada.
Temperance	United Kingdom	The ship was driven ashore and wrecked at the Hook Lighthouse, County Wexford. She was on a voyage from Cardiff to Waterford.
The Leinster	United Kingdom	The pilot cutter collided with the steamship General Lee (United States) and sank off Howth, County Dublin. Her six crew were rescued by General Lee.
Victory	United Kingdom	The smack was wrecked near Clovelly, Devon. Her crew were rescued.
Wheatsheaf	United Kingdom	The sloop was driven ashore at West Hartlepool, County Durham. She was refloated on 24 August and towed into Hartlepool for repairs.
Witch	United Kingdom	The ship struck the Whislem Rock, off the coast of Caernarfonshire and sank. Her crew were rescued. She was on a voyage from Dieppe, Seine-Inférieure, France to Runcorn.
Unnamed	United Kingdom	The ship was wrecked on the Dove Spit, in Liverpool Bay.
Unnamed	United Kingdom	The brig foundered in the English Channel off Portland Bill, Dorset with the loss of all hands.
Unnamed	United Kingdom	The schooner foundered off Hartland Point, Devon with the loss of all on board.
Unnamed	United Kingdom	The smack sank in Morte Bay. Her crew were rescued by a pilot boat.
Unnamed	United Kingdom	The ship was abandoned off Lynton. Her crew were rescued by a steamship.
Unnamed	United Kingdom	The hulk was driven ashore at Roche's Point, County Cork. All on board were rescued.
Unnamed	United Kingdom	The Mersey Flat was driven ashore at Llandudno, Caernarfonshire.
Unnamed	United Kingdom	The brigantine was abandoned off Caldy Island, Pembrokeshire. Her crew were rescued.
Unnamed	United Kingdom	The brigantine was abandoned off the Monkstone Lighthouse, Pembrokeshire. Her crew were rescued by the Tenby Lifeboat Florence ( Royal National Lifeboat Institution).

== 23 August ==
List of shipwrecks: 23 August 1868
Ship	State	Description
Ann	United Kingdom	The brigantine was abandoned by her crew in the Irish Sea. They were rescued by Victoria (United Kingdom), which put four of her crew on board with the intention of taking Ann into Saint Tudwal's Islands, Pembrokeshire. Ann was on a voyage from Dublin to Wexford.
Cattofield	United Kingdom	The ship was destroyed by fire at sea. Her crew were rescued by Altheia (United Kingdom). Cattofield was on a voyage from Leith, Lothian to Penang, Straits Settlements.
Edward Barnett	United Kingdom	The ship was driven ashore at Formby, Lancashire. Her crew were rescued.
George Canning	United Kingdom	The ship was wrecked at Northam, Devon. Her crew were rescued. She was on a voyage from Portmadoc, Caernarfonshire to Shoreham-by-Sea, Sussex.
Hope	United Kingdom	The ship was wrecked at Pendine, Carmarthenshire. Her crew were rescued.
Orwell	United Kingdom	The smack was abandoned off Ilfracombe, Devon with the loss of a crew member. Survivors were rescued by the steamship Bwllfa (United Kingdom). Orwell was on a voyage from Devoran, Cornwall to Saundersfoot, Pembrokeshire. She came ashore at Porlock Weir, Somerset.
Queen Victoria	United Kingdom	The schooner was loss off Clovelly, Devon. Her crew were rescued. She was on a voyage from St. Mawes, Cornwall to Newport, Monmouthshire.
Rose	Denmark	The ship was driven ashore at Nash Point, Glamorgan, United Kingdom. She was refloated and taken into Newport, Monmouthshire, United Kingdom.
Saltash	United Kingdom	The schooner was lost at Hartland Point, Devon with the loss of five crew.
St. Leon	Spain	The ship collided with William Cass (United Kingdom) and foundered at Cardiff, Glamorgan, United Kingdom. Her crew were rescued. She was on a voyage from Bilbao to Swansea, Glamorgan.
Teresa	United Kingdom	The ship was wrecked on the Robin Rigg Bank, in the Solway Firth. Her crew were rescued. She was on a voyage from Silloth, Cumberland to Londonderry.
Victory	United Kingdom	The smack was lost near Clovelly, Devon. Her crew were rescued.

== 24 August ==
List of shipwrecks: 24 August 1868
Ship	State	Description
Admiral	(United Kingdom of Great Britain and Ireland) Jersey	The ship foundered in the Bristol Channel off Lundy Island, Devon. A survivor was rescued by a pilot boat.
Confidence	Prussia	The ship foundered in the North Sea. Her crew were rescued by a smack.
Home	United Kingdom	The ship was driven ashore and wrecked in Lynmouth Bay with some loss of life. She was on a voyage from Bristol, Gloucestershire to Quebec City, Canada. She was refloated and taken into the Kingroad.
Magnolia	United Kingdom	The ship was driven ashore at Leasowe, Cheshire. Her crew were rescued. She was on a voyage from Liverpool, Lancashire to Charleston, South Carolina.
Mermaid	United Kingdom	The cutter was abandoned in the North Sea. Her crew were rescued by Eana (Norway). Mermaid was on a voyage from Chatham, Kent to Plymouth, Devon. She was taken into Vlissingen, Zeeland, Netherland in a derelict condition.
Recovery	United Kingdom	The ship was driven ashore at Beer, Devon.
Revanche	United Kingdom	The ship foundered in the North Sea. Her crew were rescued. She was on a voyage from London to a Baltic port.
San Lina	Spain	The ship departed from Havana, Cuba for Falmouth, Cornwall, United Kingdom. No further trace, presumed foundered with the loss of all hands.
Stag	United Kingdom	The schooner was driven ashore on Eierland, North Holland, Netherlands and was abandoned by her crew. She subsequently became a wreck.
Star of Gwent	United Kingdom	The ship was wrecked on the Isla de Lobos, Uruguay. Her crew were rescued. She was on a voyage from Newport, Monmouthshire to Montevideo, Uruguay.

== 25 August ==
List of shipwrecks: 25 August 1868
Ship	State	Description
Argyll	United Kingdom	The steamship was driven ashore in the Burnt Islands, Argyllshire.
Concordia	United Kingdom	The ship was driven ashore on Märket, Sweden/Grand Duchy of Finland.
Emanuel	United Kingdom	The ship was driven ashore and wrecked 4 nautical miles (7.4 km) east of Leba, Prussia. Her crew were rescued. She was on a voyage from Sundsvall, Sweden to Aberdeen.
Incanaise	France	The ship was wrecked at "Arnhohn". She was on a voyage from Rouen, Seine-Inférieure to Hamburg.
Mette Margretha	Norway	The ship was driven ashore on the coast of Sweden. She was on a voyage from London, United Kingdom to Sundsvall. She was refloated and taken into Helsingør, Denmark in a leaky condition.
Reliance	United Kingdom	The ship struck rocks and sank off Hanko, Grand Duchy of Finland. Her crew were rescued.
Rosita	United Kingdom	The ship foundered off the Dutch coast. Her crew were rescued by a smack. She was on a voyage from Sunderland, County Durham to Bruges, West Flanders, Belgium.
Sir James Matheson	United Kingdom	The brigantine collided with Tyro (United Kingdom) and sank in the English Channel off Dungeness, Kent. Her crew were rescued by Tyro. Sir James Matheson was on a voyage from Sunderland to Plymouth, Devon.

== 26 August ==
List of shipwrecks: 26 August 1868
Ship	State	Description
Celestine	United Kingdom	The ship was run ashore at "Pellan". Her crew were rescued. She was on a voyage from Faversham, Kent to Newcastle upon Tyne, Northumberland.
Duncan Dunbar	United Kingdom	The ship ran aground on the Longsand, in the North Sea off the coast of Essex. She was on a voyage from Newcastle upon Tyne, Northumberland to Pembroke. She was refloated and taken into Harwich, Essex in a leaky condition.
Economist	United Kingdom	The ship was driven ashore at the Mumbles, Glamorgan. She was on a voyage from Quebec City, Canada to Port Talbot, Glamorgan.
Flying Fish	United Kingdom	The ship struck the Cabœufs or the Ratiers and was consequently beached at Honfleur, Manche, France.
Sceptre	United Kingdom	The brig was driven ashore at Kettleness, Yorkshire. She was on a voyage from London to Seaham, County Durham. She was refloated the next day and taken into Whitby, Yorkshire.

== 27 August ==
List of shipwrecks: 27 August 1868
Ship	State	Description
Anna Delius	United Kingdom	The ship was beached in the River Thames. She was on a voyage from Quebec City, Canada to London. She was refloated on 31 August and taken into London.
Catherine Campbell	United Kingdom	The ship was driven ashore and sank in the Firth of Forth. Her crew were rescued. She was on a voyage from Hull, Yorkshire to Glasgow, Renfrewshire.
Celestine	United Kingdom	The ship was driven ashore near "Pellew", Netherlands.
Helen Highfield	United Kingdom	The ship was driven ashore at Schoorl, North Holland, Netherlands with the loss of two of her crew. She was on a voyage from Newcastle upon Tyne, Northumberland to Middelburg, Zeeland, Netherlands. She had broken up by 29 August.
Johanna	Bremen	The ship was driven ashore and wrecked near "St. Peter", Prussia. Her crew were rescued. She was on a voyage from Danzig to Bremen.
Six Sodskende	Denmark	The ship foundered in the Dogger Bank. Her crew were rescued by Kare (Flag unknown). Six Sodskende was on a voyage from Poole, Dorset, United Kingdom to Copenhagen.
Unnamed	Flag unknown	A collier barque was reported run down off Cape Clear Island, County Cork by the steamship Russia (United Kingdom). Her crew were rescued by Russia and carried to Liverpool.

== 28 August ==
List of shipwrecks: 28 August 1868
Ship	State	Description
Adriana	United Kingdom	The ship was driven ashore in the Belfast Lough. She was on a voyage from Belfast, County Antrim to Glasgow, Renfrewshire. She was refloated and put back to Belfast in a leaky condition.
British Admiral, and Challenge	United Kingdom	British Admiral ran into Challenge in the Hooghly River. She was then run into by the steamship America (United Kingdom). She was on a voyage from Calcutta, India to London. She proceeded on her voyage. Challenge was on a voyage from Calcutta to London. She put back to Calcutta.
Catharina	Netherlands	The ship was driven ashore near Landskrona, Sweden. She was on a voyage from Newcastle upon Tyne, Northumberland, United Kingdom to Landskrona.
Crusader	United Kingdom	The barque was wrecked on the coast of the Cape Colony. Her crew were rescued.
Leocadie Anna	Norway	The ship struck the Anholt Reef and sank. Her crew survived. She was on a voyage from Hartlepool, County Durham, United Kingdom to Kronstadt, Russia.
Nundeeps	United Kingdom	The schooner was wrecked on the coast of the Cape Colony. Her crew were rescued.
Sarah Brown	United Kingdom	The ship was driven ashore at North Ness, Shetland Islands.

== 29 August ==
List of shipwrecks: 29 August 1868
Ship	State	Description
Anna Catharina	Denmark	The ship was driven ashore on Düne, Heligoland. She was on a voyage from a Scottish port to Hamburg.
Octavia	United Kingdom	The ship ran aground at Cape Helles, Ottoman Empire. She was on a voyage from Rutherford, New South Wales to Constantinople, Ottoman Empire. She was refloated with the assistance of a number of tugs and resumed her voyage.

== 30 August ==
List of shipwrecks: 30 August 1868
Ship	State	Description
Corinthian	United States	The 390-ton whaling bark was lost at Blossom Shoals (70°23′N 161°57′W) in the Chukchi Sea off the northwest coast of the Department of Alaska.
Lord John Russell	United Kingdom	The steamship was run into by the steamship Queen in the River Thames and was damaged. She was on a voyage from London to Dunkirk, Nord, France. She put back to London sinking at the bows.
Oceanica	United Kingdom	The barque sprang a leak and foundered off Great Orme Head, Caernarfonshire. Her crew were rescued by the steamship Mandingo (United Kingdom). Oceanica was on a voyage from Miramichi, New Brunswick, Canada to Liverpool, Lancashire.
Orient	United Kingdom	The ship was driven ashore in the Marabout Islands and broke in two. She was on a voyage from Newcastle upon Tyne, Northumberland to Alexandria, Egypt.

== 31 August ==
List of shipwrecks: 31 August 1868
Ship	State	Description
Alma and Tom	United Kingdom	The ship foundered in the North Sea 7 nautical miles (13 km) off Heligoland. Her crew were rescued by a fishing smack. She was on a voyage from London to Königsberg, Kingdom of Prussia.
Ambleside	United Kingdom	The ship was wrecked near the mouth of the Umzimkulu River, Cape Colony. Her crew were rescued. She was on a voyage from Kurrachee, India to Liverpool, Lancashire.
Ann	United Kingdom	The brig struck the breakwater at Glückstadt, Prussia and was damaged. She was on a voyage from Sunderland, County Durham to Glückstadt. She was taken into Glückstadt in a waterlogged condition and sank there. She was refloated on 5 September.
Britannia	United Kingdom	The Mersey Flat was driven ashore at Llandudno, Caernarfonshire.
Cicero	United Kingdom	The ship ran aground at West Hartlepool, County Durham and was beached. She was on a voyage from Narva, Russia to West Hartlepool.
Lion	United Kingdom	The ship sank off Wijk aan Zee, North Holland, Netherlands. Her crew were rescued.

== Unknown date ==
List of shipwrecks: Unknown date in August 1868
Ship	State	Description
Admiral	United Kingdom	The ship was driven ashore and wrecked on Madagascar before 18 August.
Campeador	Spain	The steamship was driven ashore at Gijón before 21 August. She was on a voyage from Liverpool, Lancashire, United Kingdom to Barcelona. She was refloated and put into Ferrol in a waterlogged condition and was repaired there.
Catharine Maria	United Kingdom	The ship was driven ashore. She was on a voyage from Newcastle upon Tyne, Northumberland to Faial Island, Azores.
Catherine	United Kingdom	The schooner was wrecked at The Lizard, Cornwall. Her crew were rescued.
Chrysolite	United Kingdom	The steamship ran aground in the Dardanelles. She was refloated and taken into Constantinople, Ottoman Empire.
Crown	United Kingdom	The ship ran aground at Yenikale, Russia. She was refloated.
Custaloga	United States	The barque collided with the mail steamer Russia (United Kingdom) in dense fog and sank off the coast of the Newfoundland Colony. Her crew were rescued by Russia. Custaloga was on a voyage from South Shields, County Durham, United Kingdom to New York.
Enfield	United Kingdom	The ship was driven ashore on Zanzibar. She was on a voyage from Zanzibar to an English port. She was refloated but was consequently condemned.
Germania	United Kingdom	The ship was wrecked at Bassein, India.
G. R. C.	United Kingdom	The ship was wrecked on Brier Island, Nova Scotia, Canada. She was on a voyage from Maitland, Nova Scotia to Queenstown, County Cork. Although condemned, she was refloated and taken into Westport, Nova Scotia.
Hanna Emilie	United Kingdom	The ship foundered in Liverpool Bay before 30 August with loss of life.
James Innes	United Kingdom	The brigantine ran aground on the Coal Rock, off the coast of Anglesey. She was on a voyage from Dieppe, Seine-Inférieure, France to Runcorn, Cheshire. She was refloated and beached at Holyhead, Anglesey.
Java	United Kingdom	The ship ran aground in the Strait of Sunda. She was on a voyage from Birkenhead, Cheshire to Batavia, Netherlands East Indies. She was refloated and taken into Batavia, where she arrived on 29 August.
John Hillman	United Kingdom	The ship ran aground in the Paraná River. She was on a voyage from Paysandú, Uruguay to Falmouth, Cornwall. She was refloated and resumed her voyage, but was towed into Pernambuco, Brazil on 20 August in a leaky condition.
Lady Alice	United Kingdom	The yacht foundered off Cultra, County Down on or before 12 August.
New Era	United Kingdom	The ship capsized off Puerto Rica. She was on a voyage from Saint Thomas, Virgin Islands to the Turks Islands.
Northurck	Sweden	The steamship ran aground at Visby before 12 August. She was refloated.
Pansy	United Kingdom	The ship ran aground in the Dardanelles. She was on a voyage from Genoa, Italy to Constantinople. She was refloated.
Phœbus	United Kingdom	The ship was driven ashore at Yenikale. She had been refloated by 30 August.
Queen of the Dart	United Kingdom	The ship was driven ashore at Missolonghi, Greece.
Sea Queen	United Kingdom	The steamship ran aground in the Dardanelles. She was on a voyage from Brăila, Ottoman Empire to Barcelona, Spain. She was refloated and resumed her voyage.
Sereth	Ottoman Empire	The ship was lost at Brăila. She was on a voyage from Galaţi to Brăila.
Trinity	(United Kingdom of Great Britain and Ireland) Newfoundland Colony	The brig was destroyed by fire on the coast of Labrador.
Venice	United Kingdom	The steamship departed from Cardiff, Glamorgan for Trieste on 23 or 24 August. No further trace, presumed foundered with he loss of all hands.
Willy	United Kingdom	The ship struck a rock in the Gaspar Strait and was wrecked. Her crew were rescued by the steamship Agamemnon (United Kingdom). Willy was on a voyage from Cardiff to Hong Kong.
