= USS Lenapee =

American Navy vessel

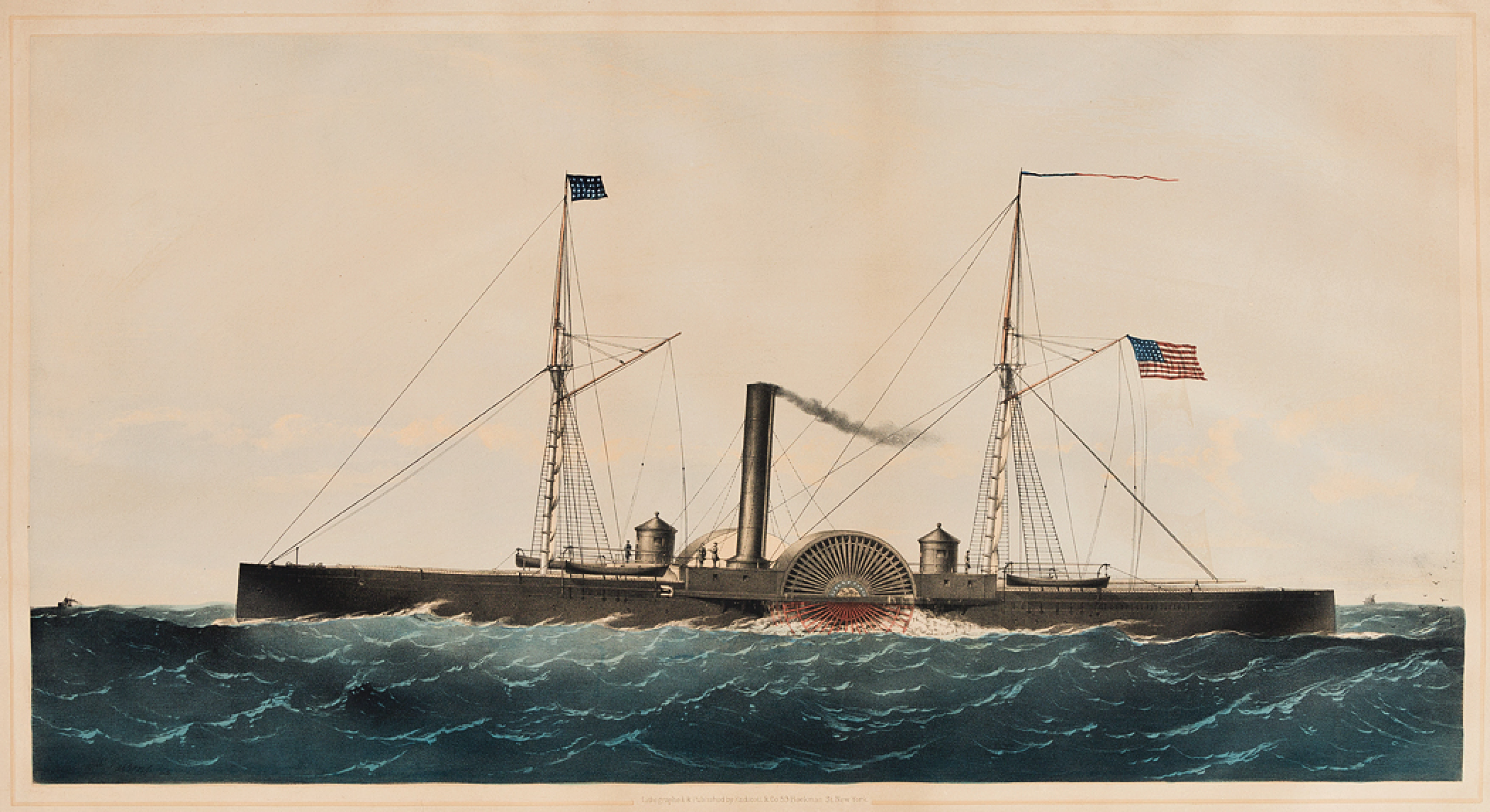
- U.S.S. Lenapee

History

United States
- Launched: 28 May 1863
- Commissioned: 30 December 1864
- Decommissioned: 17 October 1867
- Fate: sold, 26 August 1868

General characteristics
- Class & type: Sassacus-class gunboat
- Displacement: 974 tons
- Length: 205 ft (62 m)
- Beam: 35 ft (11 m)
- Draft: 7 ft 11 in (2.41 m)
- Propulsion: steam engine; side wheel-propelled; double ended
- Speed: 12 knots (22 km/h; 14 mph)
- Complement: 147
- Armament: two 100-pounder Parrott rifles; four 9" Dahlgren smoothbores; two 24-pounder howitzers; two 20-pounder rifled guns

USS Lenapee was a steamer acquired by the Union Navy during the American Civil War. She was used by the Navy as a tugboat.

== Service history ==
Lenapee, a wooden double-ended sidewheel gunboat, was launched 28 May 1863 by Edward Lupton, Brooklyn, New York; and commissioned 30 December 1864, Lt. Comdr. Samuel Magaw in command. Lenapee joined the North Atlantic Blockading Squadron at Beaufort, North Carolina, 23 January 1865 and was ordered to Cape Fear River for final operations against Wilmington, North Carolina. In the weeks that followed she did reconnaissance and patrol work while Rear Admiral David Dixon Porter and Major General Terry marshaled their forces for an attack on Fort Anderson.

On 7 February, as Brigadier General John M. Schofield advanced from Smithville with 8,000 men, Porter attacked Fort Anderson by water. Lenapee, USS Montauk, USS Pawtuxet, USS Unadilla, and USS Pequot shelled the defensive works. The next day the Union ships moved in closer and kept up a heavy fire until the dogged Confederate defenders were at last forced to evacuate the fort under cover of darkness. After Wilmington had fallen 22 February, Lenapee was one of three ships ordered to remain in the Cape Fear River to defend the town and to help clear the navigable waters around Wilmington of obstructions. There she served until after the end of the Civil War, retained at Wilmington through 1866 as protection against civil riots. Lenapee decommissioned 17 October 1867 and was sold at Portsmouth, New Hampshire, to E. Stannard 26 August 1868.
