= Daniel G. George =

Union Navy sailor and Medal of Honor recipient (1840–1916)

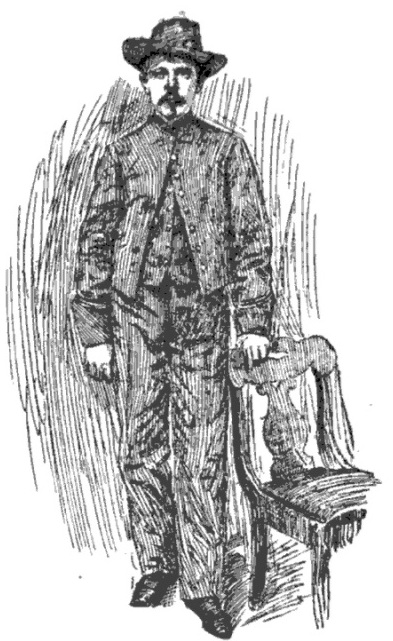
- Born: July 7, 1840; Plaistow, New Hampshire
- Died: February 26, 1916 (aged 75); Amesbury, Massachusetts
- Burial place: Locust Grove Cemetery; Merrimac, Massachusetts
- Military career
- Allegiance: United States
- Branch: United States Navy} Union Navy
- Rank: Ordinary Seaman
- Unit: U.S. Picket Boat No. 1
- Conflicts: American Civil War
- Awards: Medal of Honor

Daniel Griffin George (July 7, 1840 – February 26, 1916) alias William Smith was a Union Navy sailor in the American Civil War who received the U.S. military's highest decoration, the Medal of Honor.

== Military service ==
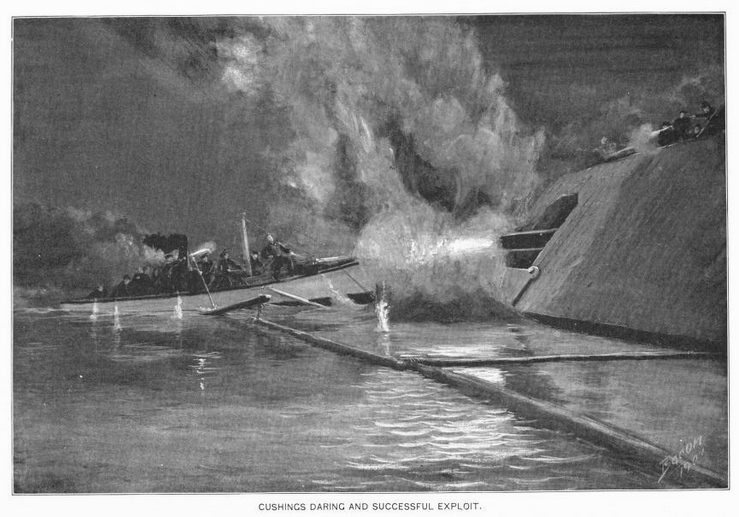
"Cushings Daring and Successful Exploit"

George was born in Plaistow, New Hampshire, on July 7, 1840. He first served during the Civil War in Company D, 1st Massachusetts Cavalry; enlisting September 16, 1861, for three years; mustered on September 17, 1861, as a Private; appointed 1st Sergeant February 8, 1863; re-enlisted January 1, 1864. George transferred to the Union Navy on May 7, 1864, as an Ordinary Seaman, under the alias name of William Smith; served on the USS North Carolina and USS Chicopee; volunteered from the Chicopee as one of the crew of U.S. Picket Boat No. 1 with Lieutenant William B. Cushing in the destruction of Rebel Ram CSS Albemarle near Plymouth, North Carolina; hurled into the Roanoke River by the explosion of the spar torpedo that sank the Albemarle and captured October 27, 1864; prisoner at the Confederate military prison in Salisbury, North Carolina until the close of war. He was discharged April 26, 1866, as a Coxswain from the Chicopee.

== Medal of Honor citation ==
Rank and organization: Ordinary Seaman, U.S. Navy. (alias William Smith.), Accredited to: New Hampshire, G.O. No.: 45, 31 December 1864.

George's official Medal of Honor citation reads:

George served on board U.S. Picket Boat No. 1, in action near Plymouth, North Carolina, 27 October 1864, against the Confederate ram, Albemarle, which had resisted repeated attacks by our steamers and had kept a large force of vessels employed in watching her. The picket boat, equipped with a spar torpedo, succeeded in passing the enemy pickets within 20 yards without being discovered and then made for the Albemarle under a full head of steam. Immediately taken under fire by the ram, the small boat plunged on, jumped the log boom which encircled the target and exploded its torpedo under the port bow of the ram. The picket boat was destroyed by enemy fire and almost the entire crew taken prisoner or lost.

== Death and burial ==
Medal of Honor recipient Daniel G. George died at Amesbury, Massachusetts on February 26, 1916, of a cerebral hemorrhage and was buried at the Locust Grove Cemetery in Merrimac, Massachusetts.
