= Bernard Harley =

US Navy Civil War Medal of Honor recipient (1842–1886)

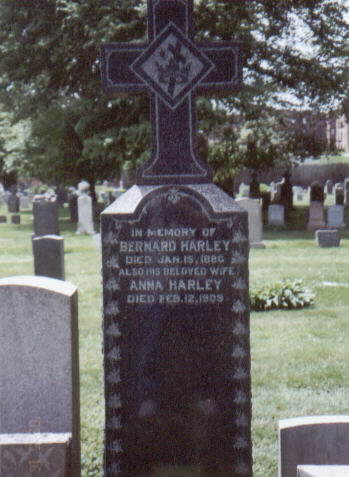
- Born: 1842; Kings County, New York
- Died: January 15, 1886 (aged 43–44); Kings County, New York
- Burial place: Holy Cross Cemetery
- Spouse: Anna Harley
- Military career
- Allegiance: United States
- Branch: United States Navy
- Rank: Ordinary Seaman
- Units: USS Chicopee (1863); United States Navy U.S. Picket Boat No. 1
- Awards: Medal of Honor

Bernard Harley (born 1842) was an Ordinary Seaman in the Union Navy during the American Civil War, where he earned the Medal of Honor.

Harley was born in 1842, in Kings County, New York. While aboard the U.S. Picket Boat No. 1, on October 27, 1864, he was awarded the Medal of Honor for his extraordinary heroism in action near Plymouth, North Carolina. The Confederate ram Albemarle had resisted many previous attacks, but Harley and his picket boat, equipped with a spar torpedo, succeeded in passing the enemy pickets. They were then able to destroy the Ablemarle. The picket boat was destroyed by enemy fire, and almost the entire crew was taken prisoner or lost. This included Harley, who was taken as a prisoner of war.

Harley was awarded his Medal of Honor on December 31, 1864. He was married to Anna Harley (?-1909). Harley died on January 15, 1886, in Kings County (Brooklyn), New York, and was later buried in the Holy Cross Cemetery.

== See also ==
- Picket boat
- CSS Albemarle
- William B. Cushing
- USS Chicopee (1863)
