= USS Russell (DDG-59) =

Arleigh Burke-class destroyer in the U.S. Navy

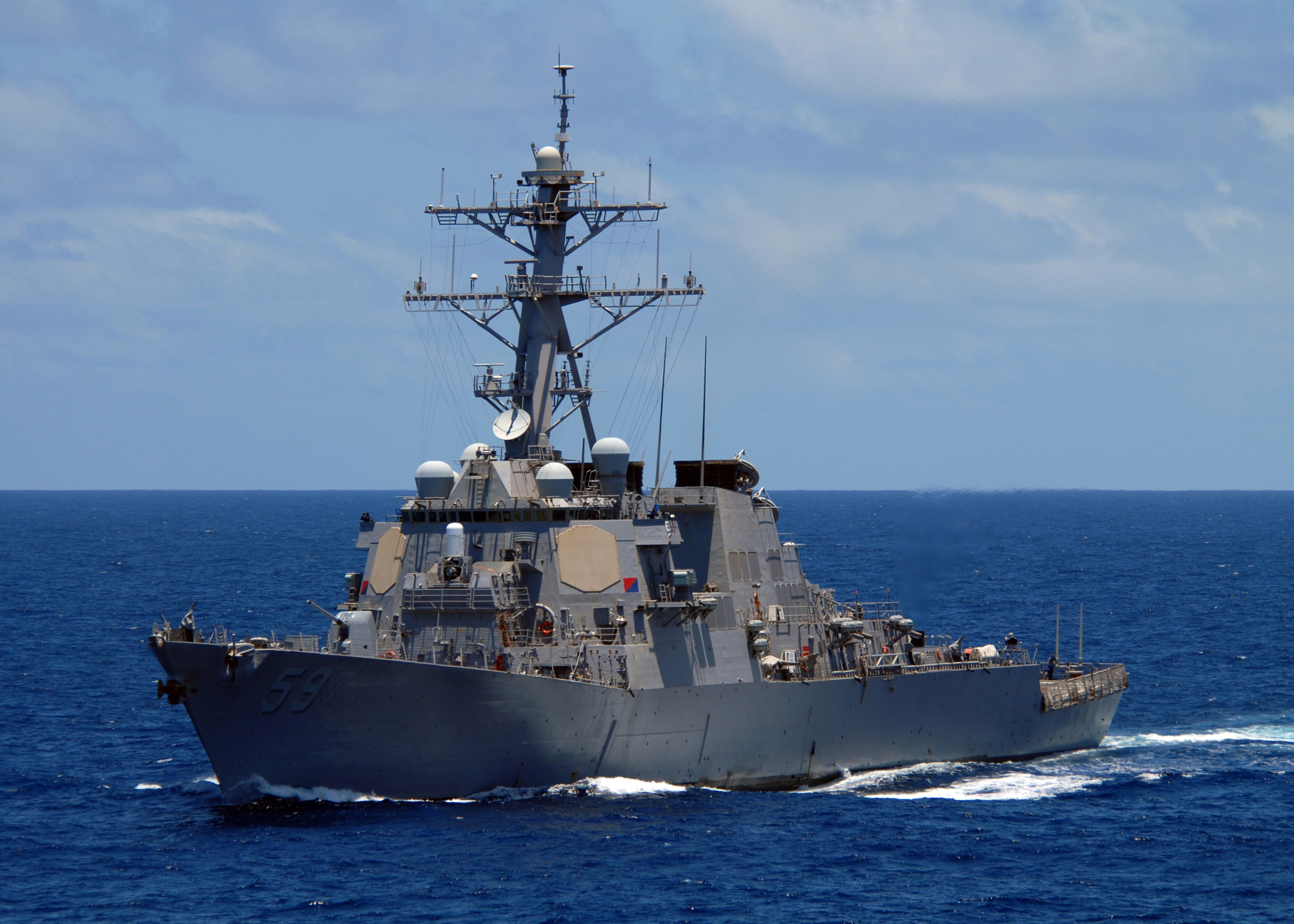
- USS Russell on 5 September 2008

History

United States
- Name: Russell
- Namesake: John Henry Russell; John Henry Russell, Jr.
- Ordered: 22 February 1990
- Builder: Ingalls Shipbuilding
- Laid down: 24 July 1992
- Launched: 20 October 1993
- Commissioned: 20 May 1995
- Home port: San Diego
- Identification: MMSI number: 338962000; Callsign: NEVV; Hull number: DDG-59
- Motto: Strength in Freedom
- Status: in active service
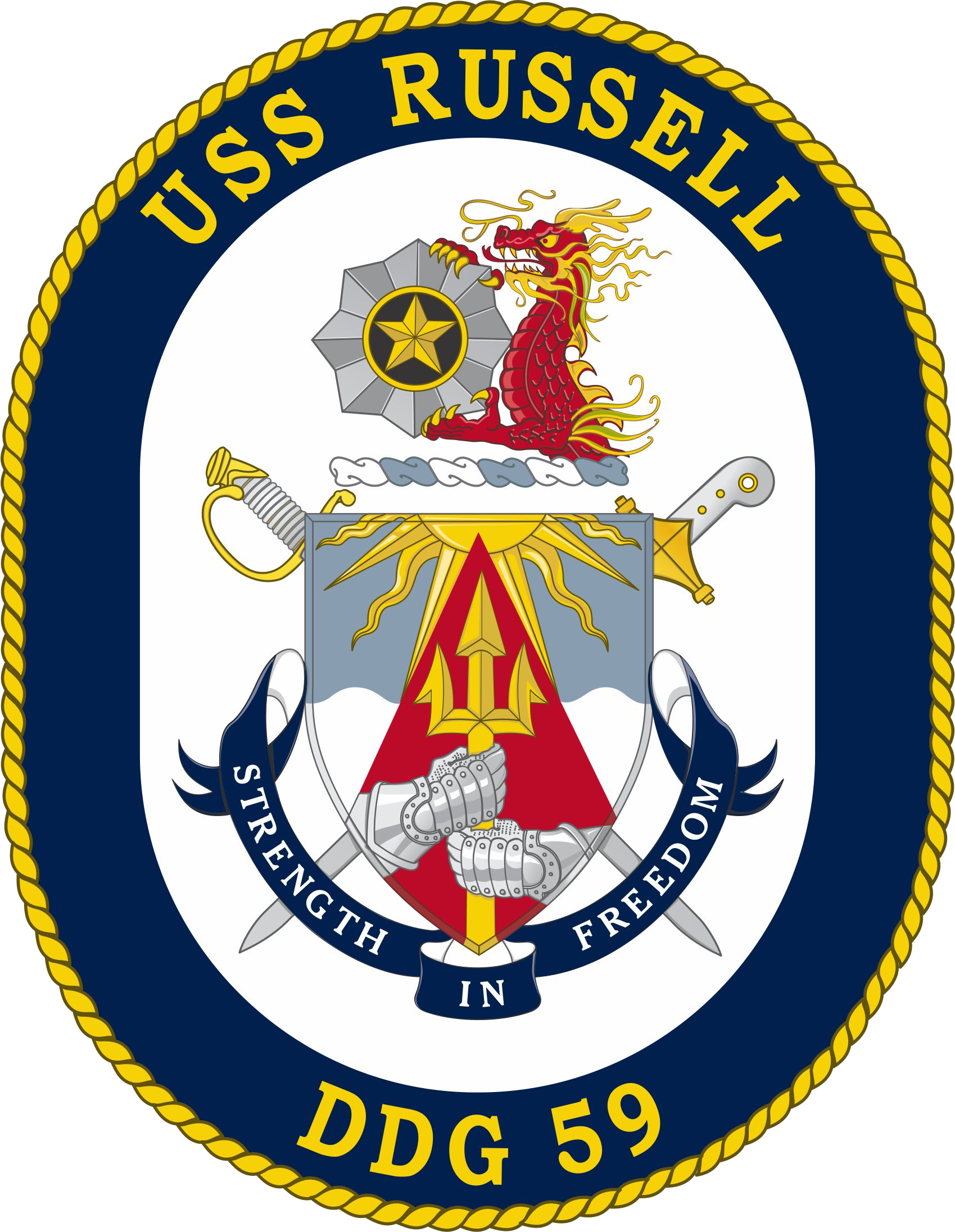
- Badge

General characteristics
- Class & type: Arleigh Burke-class destroyer
- Displacement: Light: approx. 6,800 long tons (6,900 t); Full: approx. 8,900 long tons (9,000 t)
- Length: 505 ft (154 m)
- Beam: 59 ft (18 m)
- Draft: 31 ft (9.4 m)
- Propulsion: 2 × shafts
- Speed: In excess of 30 kn (56 km/h; 35 mph)
- Range: 4,400 nmi (8,100 km; 5,100 mi) at 20 kn (37 km/h; 23 mph)
- Complement: 33 commissioned officers; 38 chief petty officers; 210 enlisted personnel
- Sensors & processing systems: AN/SPY-1D PESA 3D radar (Flight I, II, IIA); AN/SPY-6(V)1 AESA 3D radar (Flight III); AN/SPS-67(V)3 or (V)5 surface search radar (DDG-51 – DDG-118); AN/SPQ-9B surface search radar (DDG-119 onward); AN/SPS-73(V)12 surface search/navigation radar (DDG-51 – DDG-86); BridgeMaster E surface search/navigation radar (DDG-87 onward); 3 × AN/SPG-62 fire-control radar; Mk 46 optical sight system (Flight I, II, IIA); Mk 20 electro-optical sight system (Flight III); AN/SQQ-89 ASW combat system: AN/SQS-53C sonar array; AN/SQR-19 tactical towed array sonar (Flight I, II, IIA); TB-37U multi-function towed array sonar (DDG-113 onward); AN/SQQ-28 LAMPS III shipboard system
- Electronic warfare & decoys: AN/SLQ-32 electronic warfare suite; AN/SLQ-25 Nixie torpedo countermeasures; Mk 36 Mod 12 decoy launching systems; Mk 53 Nulka decoy launching systems; Mk 59 decoy launching systems
- Armament: Guns: 1 × 5-inch (127 mm)/54 mk 45 mod 1/2 (lightweight gun); 2 × 20 mm (0.8 in) Phalanx CIWS; 2 × 25 mm (0.98 in) Mk 38 machine gun system; 4 × 0.50 inches (12.7 mm) caliber guns; Missiles: 2 × Mk 141 Harpoon anti-ship missile launcher; 1 × 29-cell, 1 × 61-cell (90 total cells) Mk 41 vertical launching system (VLS): RIM-66M surface-to-air missile; RIM-156 surface-to-air missile; BGM-109 Tomahawk cruise missile; RUM-139 vertical launch ASROC; Torpedoes: 2 × Mark 32 triple torpedo tubes: Mark 46 lightweight torpedo; Mark 50 lightweight torpedo; Mark 54 lightweight torpedo
- Aircraft carried: 1 × Sikorsky MH-60R

USS Russell (DDG-59) is an Arleigh Burke-class (Flight I) Aegis guided missile destroyer in the United States Navy. She is the second ship of the USN to carry the name Russell and is named for Rear Admiral John Henry Russell and his son, Commandant of the Marine Corps John Henry Russell, Jr.

== Service history ==
In May 2004, Russell departed for a four-month deployment along with several ships including USCGC Mellon, USS Salvor, USS Fort McHenry, and USS McCampbell. The deployment was centered on an annual exercise called Cooperation Afloat Readiness and Training (CARAT) 2004.

On 15 April 2006, Russell provided aid to a fishing vessel in distress while operating in the South China Sea.

On 16 February 2007, Russell was awarded the 2006 Battle "E" award.

On 21 February 2008, Russell participated, along with USS Lake Erie and USS Decatur, in the interception and destruction of the dying US satellite US 193. Between 17 and 21 May 2008, Russell participated in Exercise KhunjarHaad, a multi-national exercise held in the Gulf of Oman. Other participating warships included the Surcouf, the British frigate HMS Montrose, the British fleet replenishment tanker RFA Wave Knight, and four other coalition ships conducted air defense; surface warfare operation; visit, board, search and seizure (VBSS); and joint gunnery exercises, which focused on joint interoperability training and proficiency. In June 2008, Russell rescued about 70 people from a disabled boat in the Gulf of Aden.

In January 2013, Russell's crew completed a hull swap with the crew of USS Halsey at Naval Base San Diego. Russell is now permanently stationed in San Diego. Halsey was moved to Russell's former homeport, Joint Base Pearl Harbor–Hickam, with the former Russell crew.

On 4 June 2020, Russell conducted a transit of the Taiwan Strait.
