= John Henry Russell =

American admiral (1827–1897)

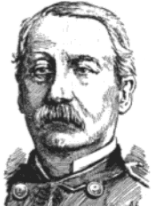
- Born: 4 July 1827; Frederick, Maryland, U.S.
- Died: 1 April 1897 (aged 69); Washington, D.C., U.S.
- Relatives: John H. Russell, Jr. (son); Brooke Astor (granddaughter)
- Military career
- Allegiance: United States of America
- Branch: United States Navy
- Service years: 1841–1886
- Rank: Rear admiral
- Commands: Kennebec; Pontiac; Cyane
- Conflicts: Mexican–American War; American Civil War

Rear Admiral John Henry Russell (4 July 1827 – 1 April 1897) was an officer of the United States Navy during the Mexican–American War and the American Civil War.

== Biography ==
Russell was born at Frederick, Maryland on 4 July 1827 to Sir James Henry Russell and Martha Wilson Russell. He was appointed midshipman on 10 September 1841 and served aboard the sloop of war USS Cyane in the Pacific until 1843. He returned on the frigate United States in 1844 and then served aboard St. Mary's in the Gulf of Mexico from 1844 to 1846. He participated in operations at Galveston, Corpus Christi, Brazos, Resaca, and Vera Cruz.

After duty with Allegheny in 1847, he graduated at the United States Naval Academy in 1848. Briefly assigned to United States Coast Survey duty, he made a cruise to Brazil in 1849, then served on the New York-West Indies mail line from 1853 to 1856, and served as navigator on Vincennes during explorations of the North Pacific and Arctic Oceans. Assigned to the Mediterranean Squadron at the end of the decade, he returned to the United States and ordnance duty at the Washington Navy Yard just prior to the outbreak of the American Civil War.

In April 1861, he assisted in preventing ships at Norfolk from falling to the enemy; and, in September, he led a boat expedition into Pensacola Harbor to destroy the Confederate privateer Judah. He next assumed command of the gunboat Kennebec and participated in operations on the Mississippi River up to Vicksburg and served in the blockade of Mobile. Commanding Pontiac in 1863, he returned to ordnance duty at Washington in 1864 and to the Pacific Squadron to serve as commanding officer of Cyane in 1864–65.

Various duties, afloat and ashore, on both coasts, Atlantic and Pacific, followed, and he completed his last assignment, three years as Commandant of the Mare Island Navy Yard, in 1886. Appointed rear admiral on 4 March 1886, he retired on 27 August, and resided in Washington, D.C., until his death on 1 April 1897.

== Family ==
Admiral Russell's son, Major General John H. Russell Jr., was a career officer in the United States Marine Corps who rose to become the Commandant of the Marine Corps. His granddaughter was Brooke Astor, a noted philanthropist and socialite.

== Memberships ==
Admiral Russell was a member of the Military Order of the Loyal Legion of the United States and the Military Order of Foreign Wars (insignia number 100).

== Namesake ==
In 1938, the destroyer Russell (DD-414) was named in his honor, while Russell (DDG-59) was named for both him and his son, Major General John H. Russell, Jr., USMC.
