= 1877 Iquique earthquake =

Earthquake in Chile

- Location within South America
- UTC time: 1877-05-10
- Local date: May 9, 1877
- Local time: 21:16
- Magnitude: 8.5 M_{s} 8.7–8.9 M_{w} 9.0 M_{t}
- Epicenter: 19.6°S 70.2°W
- Areas affected: Tarapacá Department, Peru and Litoral Department, Bolivia (both now part of Chile)
- Max. intensity: MMI XI (Extreme)
- Tsunami: Yes
- Casualties: 2,385

The 1877 Iquique earthquake occurred at 21:16 local time on 9 May (10 May UTC). It had a magnitude of 8.5 on the surface-wave magnitude scale. Other estimates of its magnitude have been as high as 8.9 M_{w} and 9.0 M_{t} (based on the size of the tsunami). It had a maximum intensity of XI (Extreme) on the Mercalli intensity scale and triggered a devastating tsunami. A total of 2,385 people died, mainly in Fiji from the tsunami.

== Historical context ==
Affected areas in the Litoral Department of Bolivia (present-day Antofagasta Region, Chile) had during this period been subject to the Atacama border dispute between the two countries. Under the 1874 boundary treaty between Bolivia and Chile, the border between the two nations as of 1877 followed the 24th parallel south. The terms of that treaty required that Bolivia not levy taxes on Chilean companies mining nitrates between the 23rd and 24th parallels (including the city of Antofagasta) for 25 years, except for agreed duties to be shared between the two countries.

Following extensive damage in the 1877 earthquake and tsunami, the municipal authorities in Antofagasta voted for a tax of 10 centavos per quintal (approximately 46 kg or 101 lb) of nitrates exported to fund reconstruction of the town. The Chilean Antofagasta Nitrate & Railway Company, a major nitrate mining company in the region, refused to pay, backed by the Chilean government. This dispute resulted in the War of the Pacific, fought from 1879 to 1884, by which Chile gained control of territory as far north as Tacna, including Bolivia's entire coastline.

== Tectonic setting ==
Coastal regions of Peru and Chile lie above the convergent boundary, where the Nazca plate is being subducted beneath the South American plate along the line of the Peru–Chile Trench. The rate of convergence across this boundary is measured at about 8 cm (3.1 in) per year. This boundary has been the site of many great megathrust earthquakes, in addition to events caused by faulting within both the subducting and over-riding plates.

== Characteristics ==
=== Earthquake ===
The shaking lasted for five minutes at Caleta Pabellón de Pica, a coastal town 70 km (43 mi) south of Iquique. The area of felt intensity of VIII on the Mercalli intensity scale or greater, extended from about 50 km (31 mi) south of Arica to just south of Cobija. This indicates a rupture length of about 420 km (260 mi).

=== Tsunami ===
A 10 m (33 ft) wave was observed along about 500 km (310 mi) of coastline, from Arica in the north to Mejillones in the south. Eight separate large waves were recorded in Arica. The tsunami affected the coasts of Peru and northern Chile and was observed across the Pacific Rim. A tsunami height of 2 m (6 ft 7 in) was observed in Fiji; 3.7 m (12 ft) in Hilo, Hawaii; and 3 m (9.8 ft) in Kamaishi, Iwate, Japan.

== Damage ==
The earthquake shaking caused significant damage over most of the coastal parts of the Tarapacá and Litoral departments. The tsunami reached St. Mark's Cathedral in Arica. The hulk of the U.S. gunboat Wateree, which had been beached hundreds of metres inland by the final wave of the tsunami triggered by the 1868 Arica earthquake, was moved several kilometres to the north along the coast and nearer the shoreline.

== Casualties ==
The earthquake itself killed 103 people, including 33 workers as a result of a landslide at Caleta Pabellón de Pica and four miners in Tocopilla. An additional 200 deaths in Caleta Pabellón de Pica were attributed to the tsunami, in addition to 77 other casualties across the coastal Tarapacá and Litoral region. The majority of deaths from the tsunami – roughly 2,000 – were in Fiji, with another five in Hilo, Hawaii.

== Future earthquake hazard ==
The rupture area of the 1877 earthquake has been recognised as one of the major seismic gaps on the plate boundary, known as the "Northern Chile Seismic Gap". The M_{w} 7.7 2007 Tocopilla earthquake occurred at the southern edge of the gap, but is not considered to have necessarily reduced the risk of a great megathrust earthquake within this area. In 2005, a recurrence period of 135 years was estimated for great earthquakes along this part of the plate boundary, suggesting that a similar earthquake to the 1877 event was likely in the early 21st century. The 2014 Iquique earthquake struck in the same seismic gap with a magnitude of M_{w} 8.2.

== See also ==
- 1868 Arica earthquake
- List of earthquakes in Chile
- List of historical earthquakes
- List of tsunamis
- List of megathrust earthquakes
