= Sassacus-class gunboat =

US Navy gunboats of the American Civil War

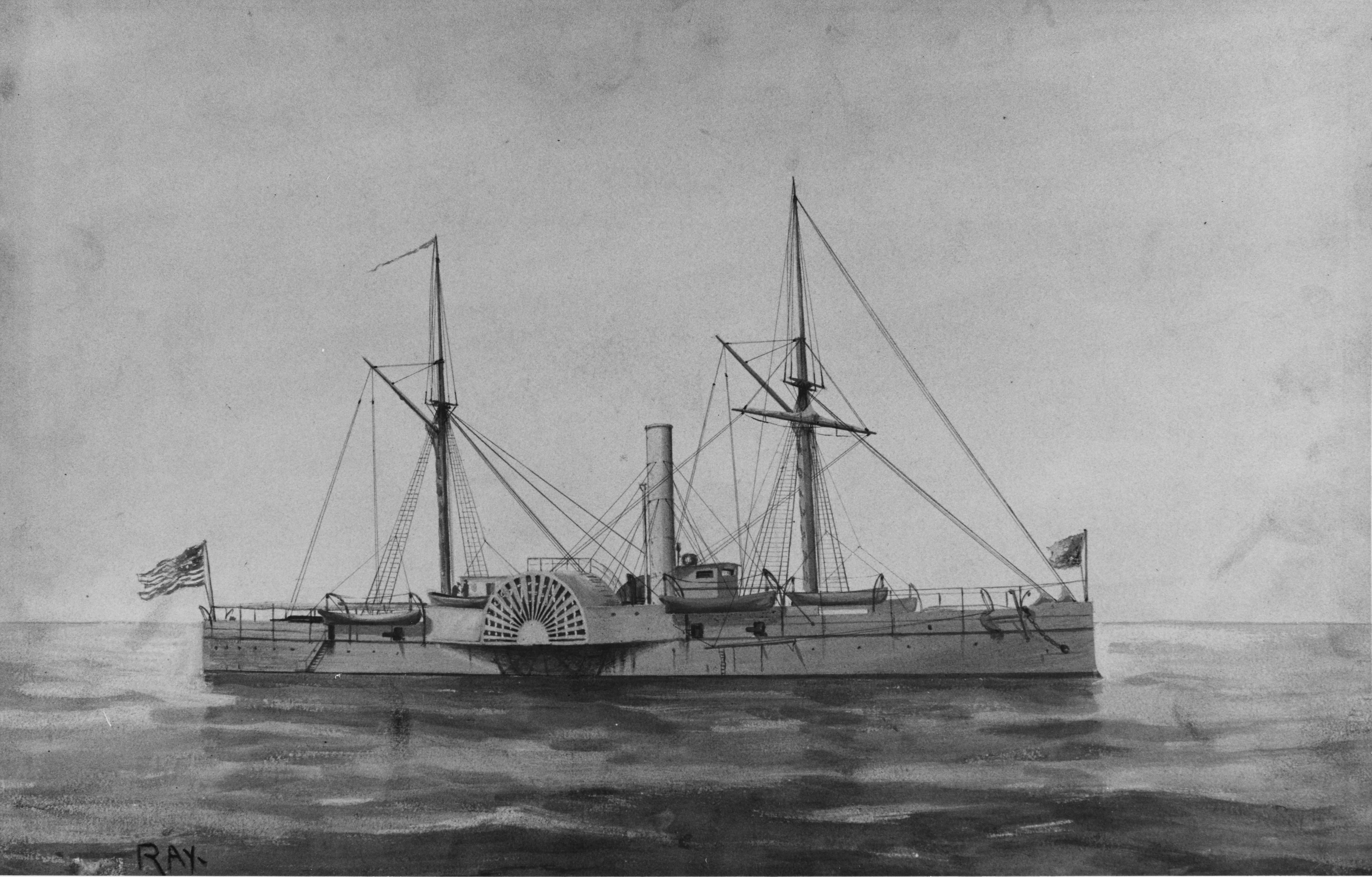
- Wash illustration depicting USS Tallapoosa during the Civil War

Class overview
- Name: Sassacus-class gunboat
- Builders: Varied, see ships in class
- Operators: Union Navy; United States Navy
- Preceded by: Octorara class
- Succeeded by: Mohongo class
- Built: 1862–1866
- In service: 1863–1892
- Completed: 28
- Lost: 2
- Retired: 26

General characteristics
- Type: Side-wheel gunboat
- Tonnage: 1,173 tons
- Length: wl: 255 feet (78 m)
- Beam: 35 feet (11 m)
- Draft: 9 feet (2.7 m)
- Propulsion: 2 × boilers; 1 × engine; 2 × side wheels
- Sail plan: Schooner
- Speed: 12.1 knots (22.4 km/h; 13.9 mph)
- Complement: 163
- Armament: 2 × 100 lb (45 kg) pivot guns; 4 × 9 in (23 cm) Dahlgren guns; 2 × 24 lb (11 kg) howitzers

The Sassacus-class gunboat was a series of 28 wooden side-wheel gunboats built for the Union Navy during the American Civil War. As double-ended gunboats, the vessels were intended for operations in shallow water throughout the Confederate States and were used to maintain the Union Blockade. They were the most produced class of warships built in the United States at the time. Almost every ship participated in the war, although they were obsolete during peacetime. By 1870, eight years after construction began, almost every ship had been sold off for civilian use.

== Development and design ==
During the American Civil War, the Union Navy ordered the mass construction of double-ended gunboats. The gunboats, with a shallow draft and identical fore and aft, were intended for littoral and riverine operations against the Confederate States. Compared to other gunboats, the double-ended vessels could shoot in either direction without the need to turn around. The ships were primarily propelled by two side-wheels mounted amidship, although they were also equipped with two masts. The first twelve double-ended gunboats formed the heterogeneous Octorara class, and the Navy considered the design of Port Royal best of the class. Criticism of earlier Unadilla-class gunboats were that the ships were small and slow, so the Navy enlarged the double-ended gunboat design to produce the Sassacus class.

The Sassacus-class design featured a length along the waterline of 240 feet (73 m), beam of 35 feet (11 m), mean draft of 8 feet 6 inches (2.59 m), and a displacement of 1,173 tons. The ships could carry 201 tons of coal, which was fed to two boilers that powered an inclined direct-acting engine to turn two side-wheels that produced 872 indicated horsepower (650 kW) and 12.1 knots (22.4 km/h; 13.9 mph) across each ship. The hulls were framed with white oak and planked with white pine, with metal bulkheads on each side of the engine rooms and a wooden bulkhead in the fore and aft. The ships were rigged as schooners and had a complement of 149 enlisted sailors and 14 officers. While varied, initial armament consisted of two 100-pound (45 kg) pivot guns on the fore and aft along with four 9-inch (23 cm) Dahlgren guns and two 24-pound (11 kg) howitzers.

The design was modified in several gunboats. Wateree was built with an iron hull, Eutaw included experimental superheating boilers, and Algonquin was fitted with machinery designed by E. N. Dickerson to investigate his design, which was a failure. The Sassacus-class design was later enlarged to produce the seven iron-hulled Mohongo-class gunboats, the third and final series of American double-ended gunboats built during the war.

== Service history ==
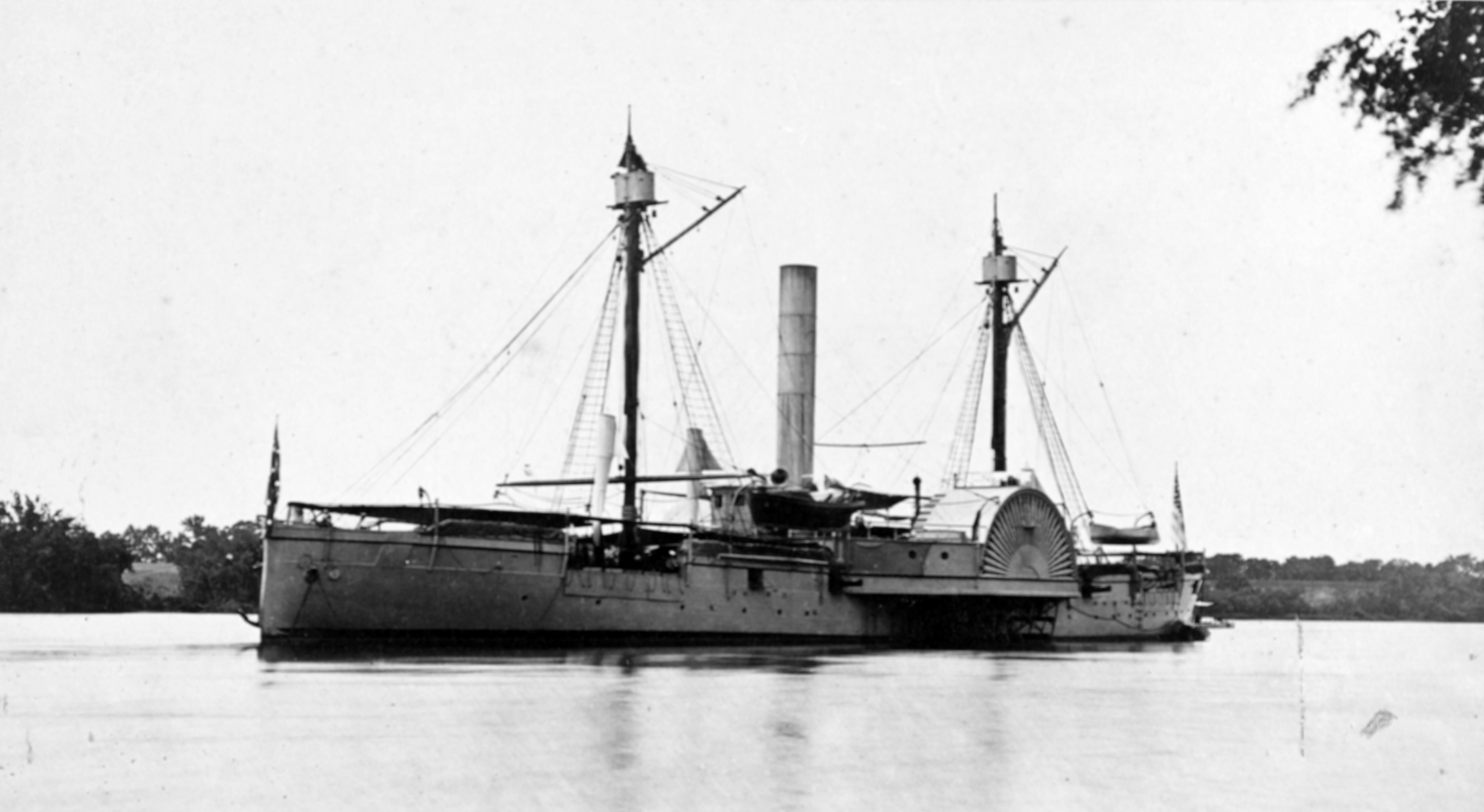
USS Agawam moored in the James River in July 1864

Construction contracts were awarded during the Autumn of 1862, with eighteen awarded to civilian shipyards and ten to government-operated navy yards. All but three ships were completed in time to join the war effort, and Algonquin was the only gunboat not to be commissioned. Several ships suffered from poor construction; problems included Tallapoosa's deck that threatened to collapse under the weight of the guns and Ascutney having been condemned due to structural faults less than two months after entering service. Further issues arose when the Navy was unable to find contractors willing to build the ships' engines on short notice. The shortage was resolved by Engineer-in-Chief Benjamin Isherwood, who traveled across the North and negotiated agreements to build the steam equipment. The 28 ships was the most numerous class of warship ever built in the United States at the time, and held the record until World War I.

Once commissioned, the gunboats were assigned to squadrons that maintained the Union Blockade. They captured various Confederate vessels and took part in Union expeditions up Southern rivers or assaults on Confederate forts. The only war-time loss was Otsego, which sank after she struck two mines in the Roanoke River. When the Civil War ended, the Navy no longer had a need for double-ended gunboats; by 1869, all of the vessels that remained were decommissioned and sold off for civilian use. The exception was Tallapoosa, which was retained as a training ship for the US Naval Academy and rebuilt in 1872.

== Ships in class ==
Data
Name	Builder	Laid down	Launched	Commissioned	Out of service
Agawam	William D. Lawrence	1862	21 Apr 1863	9 Mar 1864	Sold, 1867
Algonquin	Brooklyn Navy Yard	1863	21 Dec 1863	–	Sold, 1869
Ascutney	G W Jackson	1863	4 Apr 1863	28 Jul 1864	Sold, 1868
Chenango	Jeremiah Simonson	1862	19 Mar 1863	29 Feb 1864	Sold, 1868
Chicopee	Paul Curtis	1862	4 Mar 1863	7 May 1864	Sold, 1867
Eutaw	Abrahams	1862	Feb 1863	2 Jul 1863	Sold, 1867
Iosco	Larrabee & Allen	1862	20 Mar 1863	26 Apr 1864	Hulked, 1868
Lenapee	E Lupton	1862	28 May 1863	30 Dec 1864	Sold, 1868
Mackinaw	Brookyln Navy Yard	1862	22 Apr 1863	23 Apr 1864	Sold, 1867
Massasoit	Curtis & Tilden	1862	8 Mar 1863	8 Mar 1864	Sold, 1867
Mattabesett	A & G Sampson	1862	1863	7 Apr 1864	Sold, 1865
Mendota	F. Z. Tucker	1862	13 Jan 1863	2 May 1864	Sold, 1867
Metacomet	Thomas Stack	1862	7 Mar 1863	4 Jan 1864	Sold, 1865
Mingoe	D. S. Mershon	1862	6 Aug 1863	29 Jul 1864	Sold, 1867
Osceola	Curtis & Tilden	1862	29 May 1863	10 Feb 1864	Sold, 1867
Otsego	Jacob Aaron Westervelt	1862	31 Mar 1863	1864	Sunk, 1864
Pawtuxet	Portsmouth Navy Yard	1862	19 Mar 1863	26 Aug 1864	Sold, 1867
Peoria	Brooklyn Navy Yard	1862	29 Oct 1863	26 Dec 1866	Sold, 1868
Pontiac	Birely, Hillman & Streaker	1862	1863	7 Jul 1864	Sold, 1867
Pontoosuc	William D. Lawrence Shipyard	1862	May 1863	10 May 1864	Sold, 1866
Sassacus	Portsmouth Navy Yard	1862	23 Dec 1862	5 Oct 1863	Sold, 1868
Shamrock	Brooklyn Navy Yard	1862	17 Mar 1863	13 Jun 1864	Sold, 1868
Tacony	Philadelphia Navy Yard	1862	7 May 1863	12 Feb 1864	Sold, 1868
Tallahoma	Brooklyn Navy Yard	1862	28 Nov 1863	27 Dec 1865	Sold, 1868
Tallapoosa	Boston Navy Yard	1862	17 Feb 1863	13 Sep 1864	Sold, 1892
Wateree	Reaney, Son & Archbold	1862	29 Aug 1863	20 Jan 1864	Wrecked, 1868
Winooski	Boston Navy Yard	1862	30 Jul 1863	27 Jun 1865	Sold, 1868
Wyalusing	William Cramp & Sons	1862	12 May 1863	8 Feb 1864	Sold, 1867
