= USS Pontiac (1863) =

Gunboat of the United States Navy

History

United States
- Name: Pontiac
- Namesake: Chief Pontiac
- Builder: Hillman & Streaker (Philadelphia)
- Laid down: 1862
- Launched: 1863
- Acquired: 7 July 1864
- Commissioned: 7 July 1864
- Decommissioned: 21 June 1865
- Fate: Sold 15 October 1867, later Larkspur

General characteristics
- Class & type: Sassacus-class gunboat
- Displacement: 974 tons
- Length: 205 ft (62 m)
- Beam: 35 ft (11 m)
- Draft: 6 ft 6 in (1.98 m)
- Speed: 11 knots
- Complement: 172
- Armament: 2 100-pdr.P.r.; 4 9" D.sb, 4 24-pdr. how., 2 heavy 12-pdr., 2 12-pdr. r.

USS Pontiac was a wooden, double-ended, side-wheel gunboat in the United States Navy during the Civil War. She was named for the Ottawa chief, Pontiac.

== Service history ==
Pontiac was begun for the Navy in 1862 by Hillman & Streaker and Neafie, Levy & Company, was delivered to the Navy at Philadelphia Navy Yard 7 July 1864, and commissioned the same day, Lieutenant Commander John Henry Russell in command.

The new gunboat joined the South Atlantic Blockading Squadron at Port Royal, South Carolina, 12 August, and proceeded to blockade station off Charleston, South Carolina. On 1 September, Lt. Comdr. Stephen B. Luce relieved Russell in command. Pontiac engaged Southern guns at Battery Marshall, Sullivan's Island 7 November. One shell exploded in the steamer's forecastle hitting six men and wounding six others.

On 13 January 1865, she steamed to Savannah, Georgia, thence some 40 miles (64 km) up the Savannah River to protect General William Tecumseh Sherman's left wing as his troops crossed the river at Sister's Ferry, Georgia, beginning their march north which soon caused Charleston to fall. Luce later credited his meeting with General Sherman as the beginning of his thinking which eventually resulted in the founding of the Naval War College. He said: "After hearing General Sherman's clear exposition of the military situation, the scales seemed to fall from my eyes....It dawned on me that there were certain fundamental principles underlying military operations,...principles of general application whether the operations were on land or at sea."

On 1 March, Pontiac captured steamer Amazon, a former Confederate ironclad laden with cotton.

After the war, Pontiac was decommissioned at New York Navy Yard 21 June 1865 and she was sold on 15 October 1867 to John Roach.

== See also ==
- Union Navy
