= USS Ascutney =

Gunboat of the United States Navy

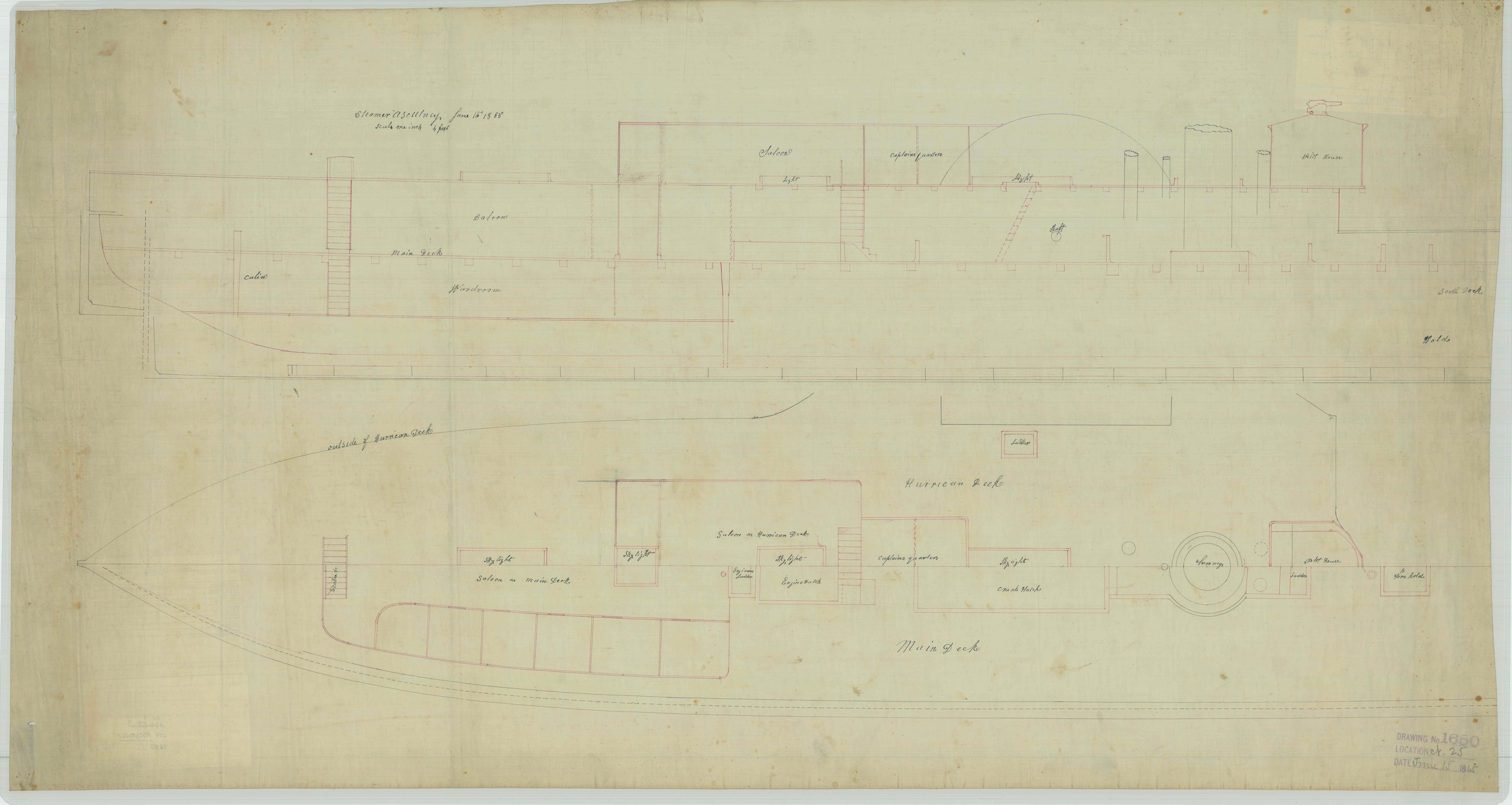
- US Navy drawing for USS Ascutney dated 16 June

History

United States
- Laid down: date unknown
- Launched: 4 April 1863
- Acquired: June 1863
- Commissioned: 28 July 1864
- Decommissioned: 22 September 1864
- In service: 19 October 1865
- Out of service: 1 August 1868
- Stricken: 1868 (est.)
- Fate: Sold, 28 October 1868

General characteristics
- Class & type: Sassacus-class gunboat
- Displacement: 974 tons
- Length: 205 ft (62 m)
- Beam: 35 ft (11 m)
- Draft: 6 ft 8 in (2.03 m)
- Depth of hold: 8 ft 6 in (2.59 m)
- Propulsion: steam engine; side wheel-propelled
- Speed: not known
- Complement: 102
- Armament: two 100-pounder rifles; four 9" smoothbores guns; two 24-pounder howitzers; two 12-pounder howitzers

USS Ascutney was a large steamer with powerful guns acquired by the Union Navy during the American Civil War. She was used by the Union Navy as a gunboat in support of the Union Navy blockade of Confederate waterways. Post-war, she performed some steamship service for the Navy.

== Service history ==
Ascutney—a wooden-hulled, side-wheel gunboat ordered by the Navy in the autumn of 1862—was launched on 4 April 1863 by George W. Jackman Jr. at Newburyport, Massachusetts, on 4 April 1863. Delivered to the New York Navy Yard in June 1863, she was commissioned on 28 July 1864, Lt. Comdr. William Mitchell in command.

On 1 August 1864, Secretary of the Navy Gideon Welles ordered Mitchell to ". . . visit the fishing grounds on the eastern coast [of the] French Islands, in the Bay [Gulf] of St. Lawrence ..." to seek the steamer Electric Spark, a prize of CSS Florida, thought to have been sent there. However, some now-unknown problem prevented Ascutney from undertaking this mission; and, three days later, Welles instructed Mitchell to bring his ship to Washington, D.C., en route to duty with the North Atlantic Blockading Squadron. The steamer arrived at Beaufort, North Carolina, on 21 August and, two days later, sailed for waters off Wilmington, North Carolina.

Assigned to the outer cordon of blockaders attempting to seal off that vital Confederate port, Ascutney was the first Union warship to encounter CSS Tallahassee when—at 4:30 a.m. on the morning of 25 August—a lookout sighted that Confederate raider, which Comdr. John Taylor Wood, CSN, was bringing back to Wilmington, North Carolina, at the end of a highly destructive 19-day cruise. Mitchell immediately gave chase, but the Southern ship's speed—17 knots—enabled her to slip away with ease. To make matters worse, Ascutney's engine broke down, taking the gunboat out of the race.

Following a survey, the gunboat was towed to the Washington Navy Yard where she was decommissioned on 22 September 1864. Extensive repairs kept her in order through the end of the Civil War. Finally recommissioned on 19 October 1865, Ascutney was stationed at the Washington Navy Yard and carried cargo and passengers in the Chesapeake Bay area and along the Atlantic Ocean coast between New York City and the Virginia Capes. Decommissioned at Washington, D.C., on 1 August 1868, she was sold on 28 October 1868 to John Roach. Since the ship's name did not appear on subsequent lists of merchant vessels, and since Roach was then embarking upon an extensive shipbuilding program, it is reasonable to conclude that she was scrapped for her materials.
