= USS Algonquin (1863) =

U.S. Navy gunboat

History
- Name: Algonquin
- Owner: U.S. Navy
- Builder: Brooklyn Navy Yard
- Launched: 21 Dec 1863
- Commissioned: Never
- Fate: Merchant service, 1860s; sold foreign 1878; fate unknown

General characteristics
- Class & type: Sassacus-class gunboat

USS Algonquin (1863), a gunboat, was launched by the New York Navy Yard on 21 December 1863. Poor machinery caused her to fail her sea trials. Consequently, she was never commissioned but rather sold on 21 October 1869.
