= USS Iosco =

Gunboat of the United States Navy

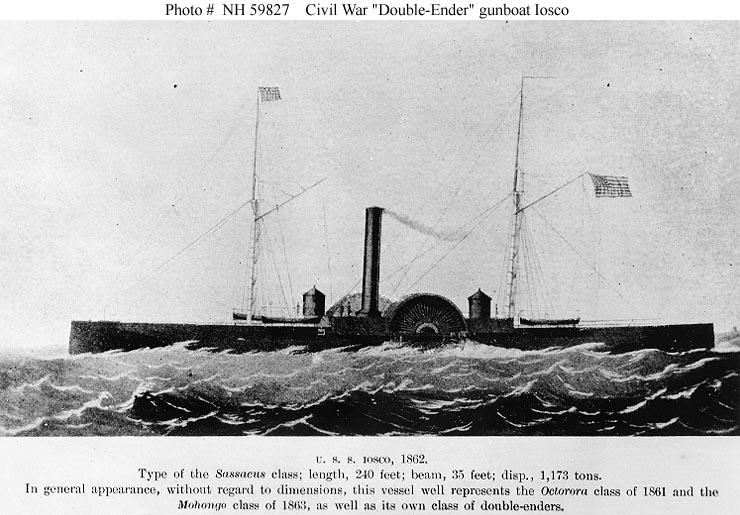

History
- Launched: 20 March 1863
- Commissioned: 26 April 1864
- Decommissioned: 28 July 1865
- In service: 9 June 1864

General characteristics
- Class & type: Sassacus-class gunboat
- Displacement: 1173 Ton
- Armament: two 100-pdr Parrott rifles; four 9" Dahlgren smoothbore; two 24-pdr howitzers; one heavy 12 pdr; one 12-pdr

The USS Iosco was a 1173-ton Sassacus class "double-ender" steam gunboat built at Bath, Maine. The ship fought during the Civil War, and was an important combatant during the battles at Fort Fisher. The ship was named Iosco after a Native American word meaning "water of light", the namesake for Iosco County, Michigan.

== Service history ==
Commissioned in April 1864, she protected shipping in the Gulf of Saint Lawrence during that summer. She assisted several ships caught in heavy storms. On 15 September, Iosco towed the USS General Burnside, which had been stuck on a reef, and was then sent to join the North Atlantic Blockading Squadron. Iosco also assisted Colonel Ellsworth, and the British barque Empress 2.

=== Attacks on Fort Fisher ===
While operating off Wilmington, North Carolina, on 21 November, Iosco captured the blockade runner CSS Sybil. During December 1864 and January 1865, she participated in the assaults on Fort Fisher, which ultimately closed Wilmington as a Confederate port.

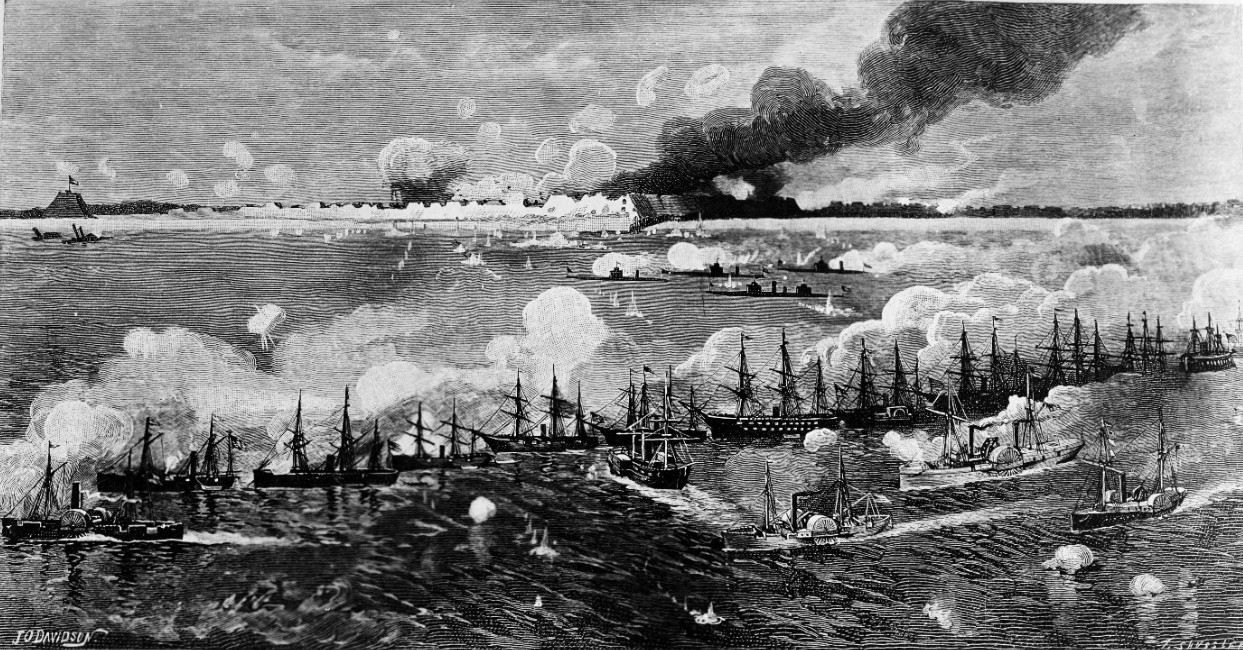
Union ships bombarding Fort Fisher prior to the ground assault.

During the first assault, Iosco engaged the batteries at Mound Fort, and hit the Confederate flag flying over the fortification, knocking it down. A Confederate shot hit the Iosco's foremast, causing minor damage. The following day, Iosco led nine other ships in another attack on the fortress. The ships got as close to shore as they could.

On 13 January, Iosco assisted in the landing of troops at Fort Fisher, during the second attack.. Forty four of Iosco's own men also participated in the ground fighting, while the ship herself provided fire support during the assault. The Confederate garrison surrendered two days later on 15 January.

=== End of the war ===
In 1865, she was active on the North Carolina Sounds, taking part in an expedition up the Roanoke River in mid-May. USS Iosco was decommissioned in July 1865 and in February 1868 was converted into a coal hulk for service at the New York Navy Yard.
