= 1868 Arica earthquake =

Southern Peru Earthquake and Pacific Ocean Tsunami

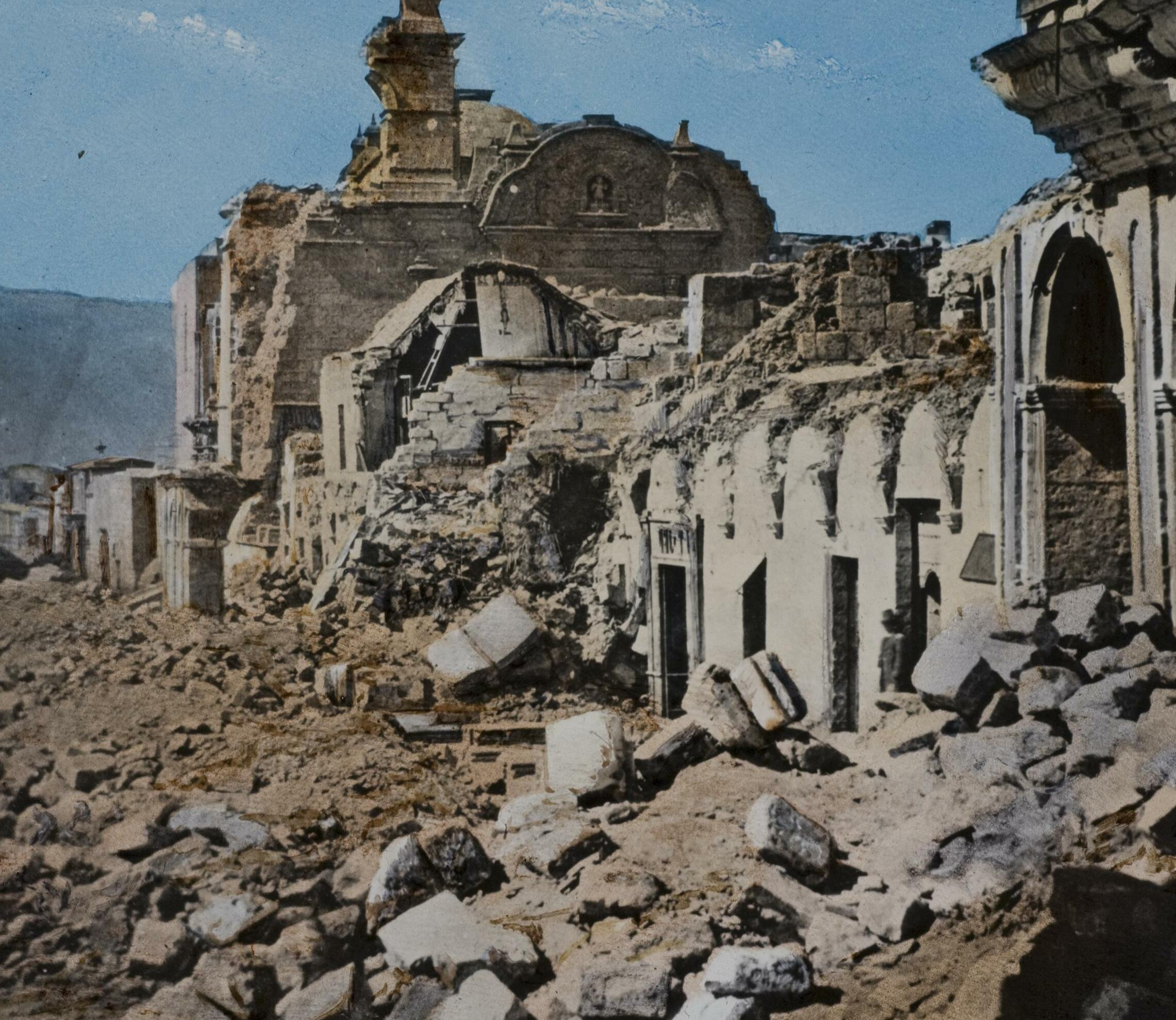
- Arequipa's damaged main square

- Location within Peru
- Local date: 13 August 1868
- Local time: 16:45
- Magnitude: 8.8–9.1 M_{w}
- Epicenter: 18.5°S 71.0°W
- Areas affected: Peru and northern Chile
- Max. intensity: MMI XI (Extreme)
- Casualties: 25,000+

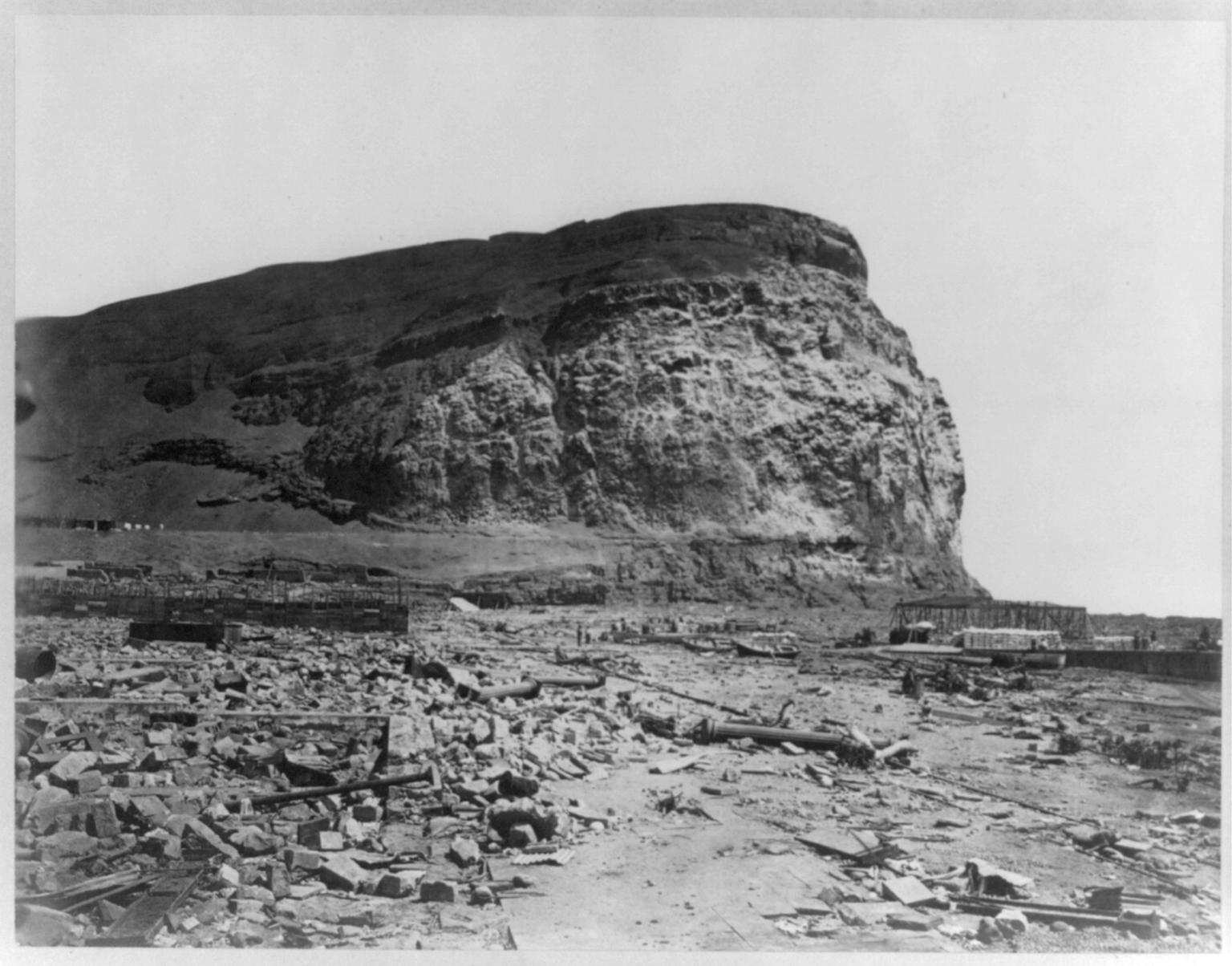
Arica after the earthquake and tsunami

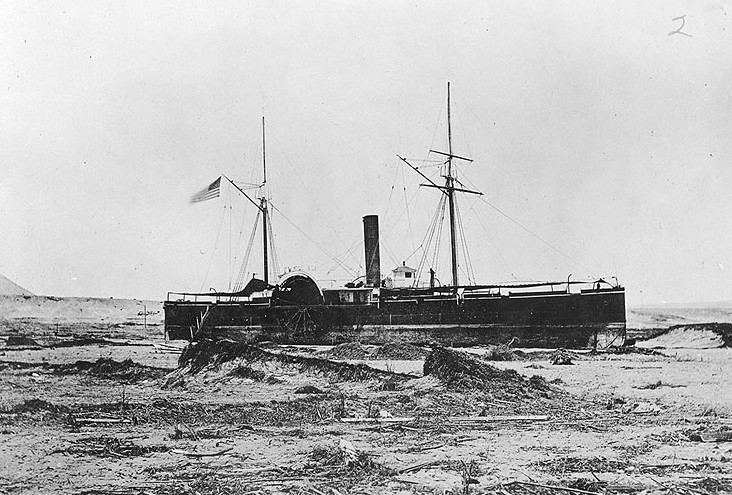
The USS Wateree beached at Arica, 430 yards (390 m) inland

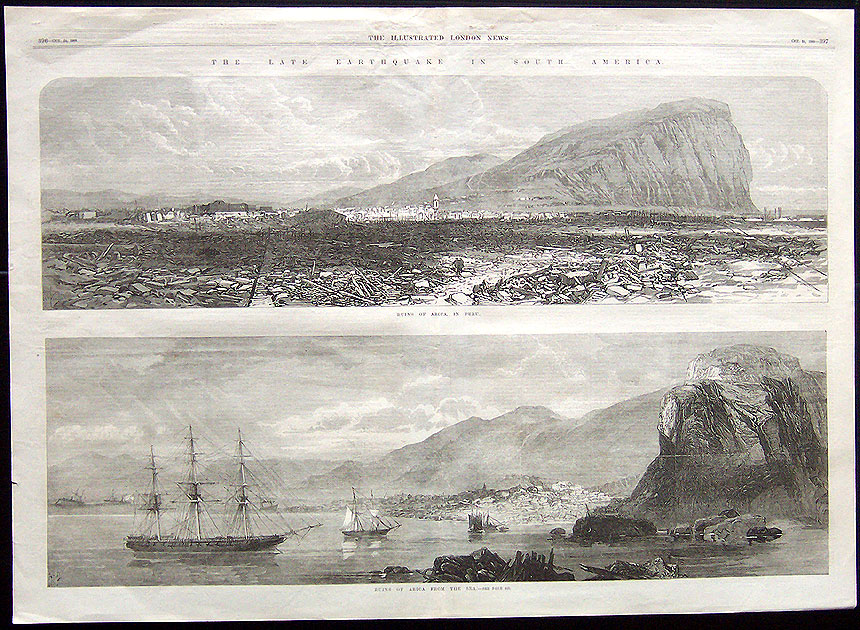
Sketches of Arica after the earthquake and tsunami from the Illustrated London News

The 1868 Arica earthquake occurred on 13 August 1868, near Arica, then part of Peru, now part of Chile, at 21:30 UTC. It had an estimated magnitude between 8.8 and 9.1, although earlier studies suggested a broader range of 8.5–9.3. A tsunami (or multiple tsunamis) in the Pacific Ocean was produced by the earthquake, which was recorded in Hawaii, Japan, Australia, and New Zealand.

== Tectonic setting ==
The earthquake occurred along the boundary between the Nazca plate and the South American plate. The earthquake was likely a result of thrust-faulting, caused by the subduction of the Nazca plate beneath the South American plate.

The coasts of Peru and Chile have a history of great megathrust earthquakes originating from this plate boundary, such as the 1960 Valdivia earthquake and the 2010 Chile earthquake.

== Damage ==
The earthquake caused almost complete destruction in the southern part of Peru, including Arica, Tacna, Moquegua, Mollendo, Ilo, Iquique, Torata and Arequipa, resulting in an estimated 25,000 casualties, and many shipwrecks.

The tsunami drove three ships anchored in port nearly 800 m (2,600 ft) inland: the 1,560-ton Peruvian corvette America, the U.S. gunboat Wateree and the U.S. store ship Fredonia, which was completely destroyed. The brig Chañarcillo and two schooners, Rosa Rivera and Regalon, were also lost. Okal et al. (2006) suggested that the tsunami also severely affected the port city of Pisco, although later studies have regarded this as weak evidence, instead concluding that Pisco and Callao likely experienced only mild inundation.

The tsunami caused considerable damage in Hawaii, washing out a bridge along the Waiohi River. In New Zealand, it is the only fatal tsunami on record, causing substantial damage on the Chatham Islands and an estimated 20 people washed out to sea. On the mainland, Banks Peninsula was hardest hit with a Maori village and two houses washed away and boats damaged, and one death was recorded.

== Characteristics ==
=== Earthquake ===
Two separate earthquakes have been described; they may both refer to the same event.

The earthquake was felt over a wide area, up to 1,400 km (870 mi) to the northwest in Samanco, Peru and 224 km (139 mi) to the east in Bolivia.

Estimates of its magnitude have varied. Okal et al. (2006) suggested a broad range of 8.5–9.3 based on tsunami modeling. However, Carvajal et al. (2025), using trans-Pacific tide gauge records from the United States and Australia together with tsunami modeling, argued that a narrower range of 8.8–9.1 is more plausible, and that the lower and upper extremes of earlier estimates are unlikely. A rupture length of about 600 kilometres (370 mi) has been inferred from the pattern of isoseismals, making it one of the largest fault breaks in modern times.

About 400 aftershocks were recorded by 25 August of that year.

Contemporary accounts say that the earthquake shaking lasted somewhere between five and ten minutes.

=== Tsunami ===
Although this event generated a tsunami that was noted across the Pacific, most of the associated damage was localised along the coasts of southern Peru and what is now northernmost Chile. The first wave arrived at Arica 52 minutes after the earthquake, with a 12 m (39 ft) height, followed by the largest 16 m (52 ft) wave 73 minutes later.

== Future risk ==
In 2001, the Arica area was identified as forming part of a seismic gap between 15° and 24°S, with no major earthquake since 1877. In accordance with this theory, a major earthquake was considered likely to happen in the near future. More specifically, in 2005, a magnitude 8.6 event was forecast for the northern Chile part of the gap, the location of the subsequent 2014 Iquique earthquake. An earthquake affecting the same sector of the plate boundary as the 1868 event with a magnitude of 8.8 was also forecast as likely to occur by 2126. A repeat of the 1868 event would probably cause more casualties, because of the greater population in areas at risk.

== See also ==
- List of megathrust earthquakes
- 1877 Iquique earthquake
- 2014 Iquique earthquake
- List of earthquakes in Chile
- List of earthquakes in Peru
- List of historical earthquakes
- List of shipwrecks in August 1868 § 13 August
- List of tsunamis
