= USS Mingoe =

Gunboat of the United States Navy

History

United States
- Name: Mingoe
- Builder: D. S. Mershon
- Cost: $157,000
- Laid down: 1862
- Launched: 6 August 1863
- Commissioned: 29 July 1864
- Out of service: 1865
- Fate: sold, 3 October 1867

General characteristics
- Class & type: Sassacus-class gunboat
- Displacement: 974 tons
- Length: 205 ft (62 m)
- Beam: 35 ft (11 m)
- Draft: 6 ft 5 in (1.96 m)
- Propulsion: steam engine; side wheel-propelled
- Sail plan: Schooner
- Speed: 11 knots (20 km/h; 13 mph)
- Complement: 163/200
- Armament: two 100-pounder guns; two 24-pounder guns; two 20-pounder guns; one heavy 12-pounder gun; one 12-pounder gun
- Armor: iron clad above waterline

USS Mingoe was a large double-ended, side wheel, ironclad steamer gunboat commissioned by the Union Navy during the American Civil War. With heavy guns and a very fast speed of 11 kn (13 mph; 20 km/h), the ship was intended by the Union Navy for use as a bombardment gunboat. They also stationed it as an interceptor gunboat off Confederate waterways to prevent trading with foreign countries.

== Service history ==
An ironclad, side wheel, steam gunboat, with schooner rigging, Mingoe was built under contract with Daniel S. Mershon, Jr. at Bordentown, New Jersey, at a shipyard located along the Delaware River. The ship was named after the Mingo people, an Iroquoian-speaking group that had been based in western Ohio in the early nineteenth century. She was based on the same plans as Sassacus. She was reported "laid down" and under construction in Bordentown by the Navy Department on October 15, 1862. By January 31, 1863, the keel had been laid. The ship's armor consisted of iron cladding the sides above the water sufficiently to protect the men on deck. By May 29, 1863, the ship was so far along in construction, The New York Times predicted that she would be launched on June 10. She was launched 6 August 1863, and commissioned 29 July 1864 at Philadelphia, Pennsylvania, Comdr. J. B. Creighton in command.

USS Mingoe joined the South Atlantic Blockading Squadron on 13 August 1864 and performed blockade duty in the St. Johns River and off Charleston, South Carolina, until the end of the year. In February 1865, the Navy used her to assist General William Tecumseh Sherman's Army in its advance up the James River. After the end of the conflict, Mingoe returned to Philadelphia, Pennsylvania. The ship was laid up at League Island until sold 3 October 1867.
