= USS Wateree (1863) =

United States Navy sidewheel gunboat

Coordinates: 18°26′30.52″S 70°18′11.43″W

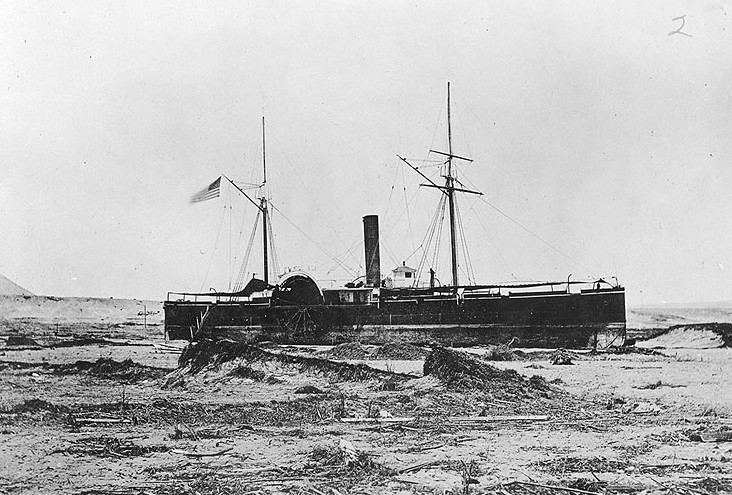
- Beached at Arica, 430 yards beyond the usual high water mark, after she was deposited there by a tsunami on 13 August 1868.

History

United States
- Name: USS Wateree
- Builder: Reaney, Son & Archbold, Chester, Pennsylvania
- Launched: 12 August 1863
- Commissioned: 20 January 1864
- Fate: Sold, 21 November 1868

General characteristics
- Class & type: Sassacus-class gunboat
- Displacement: 1173 tons
- Length: 240 ft (73 m)
- Beam: 35 ft (11 m)
- Depth of hold: 11 ft 6 in (3.51 m)
- Speed: 10 knots (19 km/h; 12 mph)
- Armament: 2 × 100-pounder Parrott rifles; 4 × 9 in (230 mm) Dahlgren smoothbore guns; 4 × 24-pounder howitzer; 2 × 13-pounder guns; 2 × 12-pounder rifles

The first USS Wateree was a sidewheel gunboat in the United States Navy during the American Civil War.

Wateree was built at Chester, Pennsylvania, by Reaney, Son & Archbold; launched on 12 August 1863; and commissioned at the Philadelphia Navy Yard on 20 January 1864, Comdr. F. E. Murray in command.

== Service history ==
Assigned to the Pacific Squadron, Wateree departed Philadelphia soon after commissioning. During the next 10 months, she made the arduous voyage around Cape Horn to the Pacific Ocean. In addition to struggling against the heavy weather for which the Cape region is noted, the warship experienced difficulty acquiring fuel. That problem necessitated her making numerous stops along the way to acquire wood for her boilers; and, as a result, Wateree did not reach San Francisco, until mid-November 1864.

Upon her arrival there, the ship entered the Mare Island Navy Yard for repairs to damage she suffered during her arduous voyage and for a hull scraping. She did not leave San Francisco until late February 1865 when she put to sea to patrol the coast of Central America. During 1866, American naval forces in the Pacific were divided into a North Pacific Squadron and a South Pacific Squadron. Wateree was assigned to the latter unit, whose patrol area extended south from Panama to Cape Horn and west to Australia. For the remaining two years of her brief naval career, Wateree patrolled the coasts of Central and South America, protecting American interests in that region.

Wateree was enforcing the Monroe Doctrine following the 14 January 1866 Peruvian declaration of war against Spain, and moved south to Arica, Peru (which would later become part of Chile) to avoid a yellow fever epidemic in Callao. The 1868 Arica earthquake struck the city while Wateree was in port on 13 August 1868. Wateree observed dust from the earthquake and collapsing buildings at 17:20, but the sea remained calm as she sent a boat ashore to offer medical assistance. After the boats were ashore, a series of ten tsunamis struck. The first inward surge reached 34 feet (10 m) above the high tide line, and all ships anchored in the harbor went aground in the following outward flow. The following inward flow created a 46-foot (14 m) wave which snapped anchor chains and carried Wateree 450 yards (410 m) inland 3 miles (5 km) north of Arica at 19:20. The accompanying store ship USS Fredonia was destroyed, drowning all but two enlisted men and three officers who were on shore. However, on the Wateree the boatswain ashore was the only casualty. Wateree was intact and upright, and her crew provided stores and aid to the civilian population of Arica. The ship was considered too far inland to be salvaged, and was sold for $2,775 to Mr. William Parker on 21 November 1868. Her hulk was used as an emergency hospital, an inn, a hospital again, and finally a warehouse. She was eventually completely destroyed by another tsunami on 9 May 1877.

== Remains ==
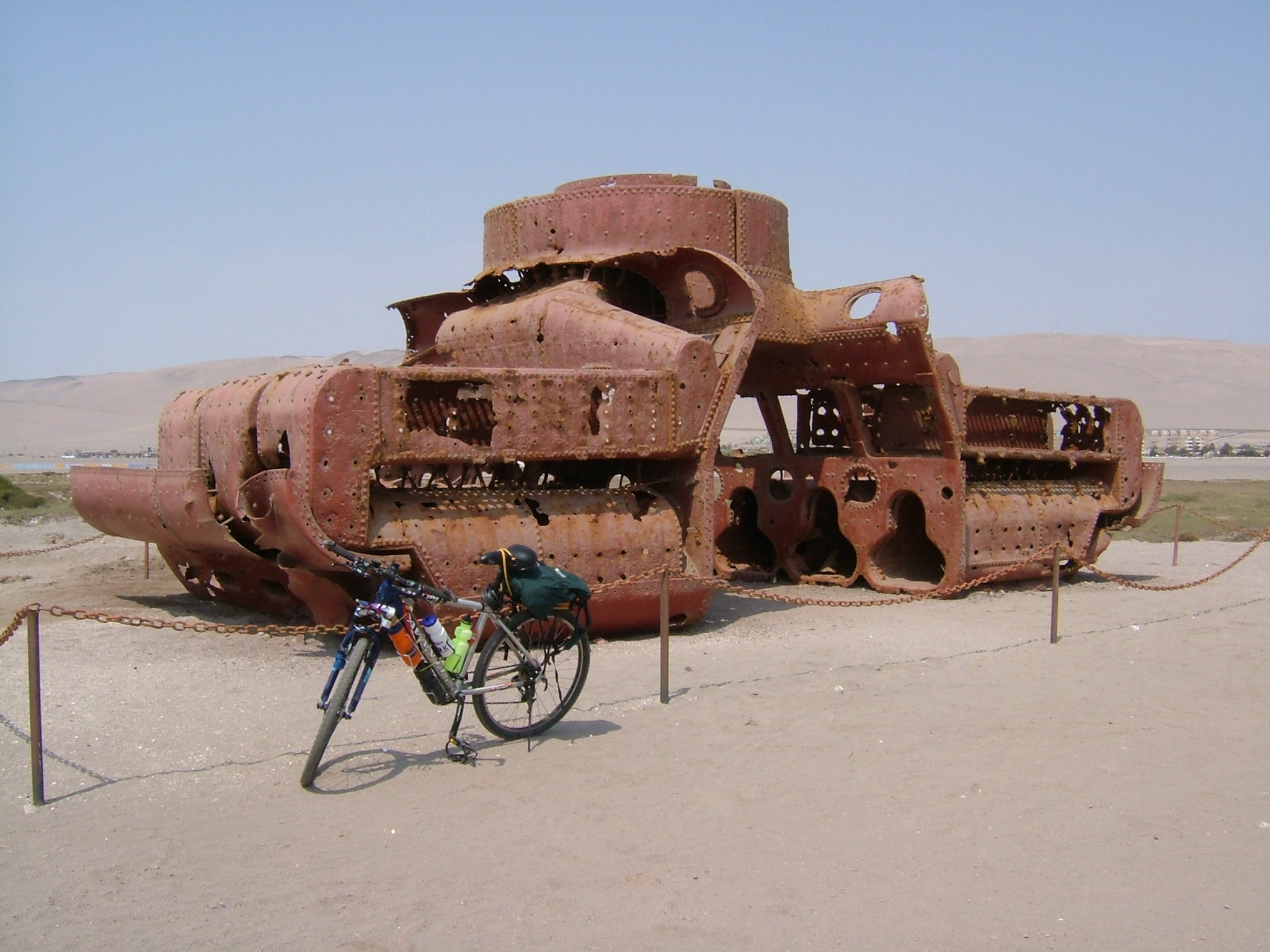
The remains of the Wateree's boilers on the shore north of Arica.

Today all that remains are parts of her boilers, mounted on the shore north of the present town of Arica, and maintained as a National Monument of Chile.

== See also ==
- Union Navy
- Union blockade
