= SS Waesland =

Ocean liner

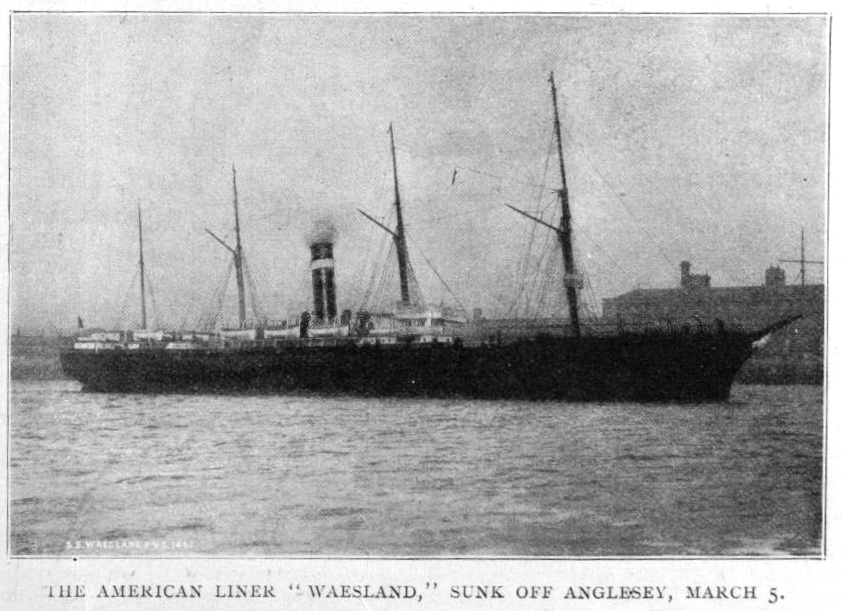
- As Waesland

History

United Kingdom
- Name: Russia; Waesland
- Namesake: Russia
- Owner: Cunard (1867-1880); Red Star Line (1880-1902)
- Operator: Cunard (1867- 1880); Red Star Line (1880-1895; American Line (1895-1902)
- Route: North Atlantic
- Builder: J & G Thomson, Glasgow
- Yard number: 93
- Launched: 20 March 1867
- Maiden voyage: 15 Jun 1867
- Identification: United Kingdom Official Number 12729
- Fate: Sunk after collision, 5 March 1902

General characteristics
- Type: Liner
- Tonnage: 4.752 GRT
- Length: 109.1 m (358 ft)
- Beam: 13.1 m (43 ft)
- Propulsion: Steam reciprocating engine, single screw; Re-engined with compound engine 1880; Re-engined with triple expansion engine 1889
- Sail plan: 3 masts
- Speed: 14 kn (26 km/h; 16 mph)

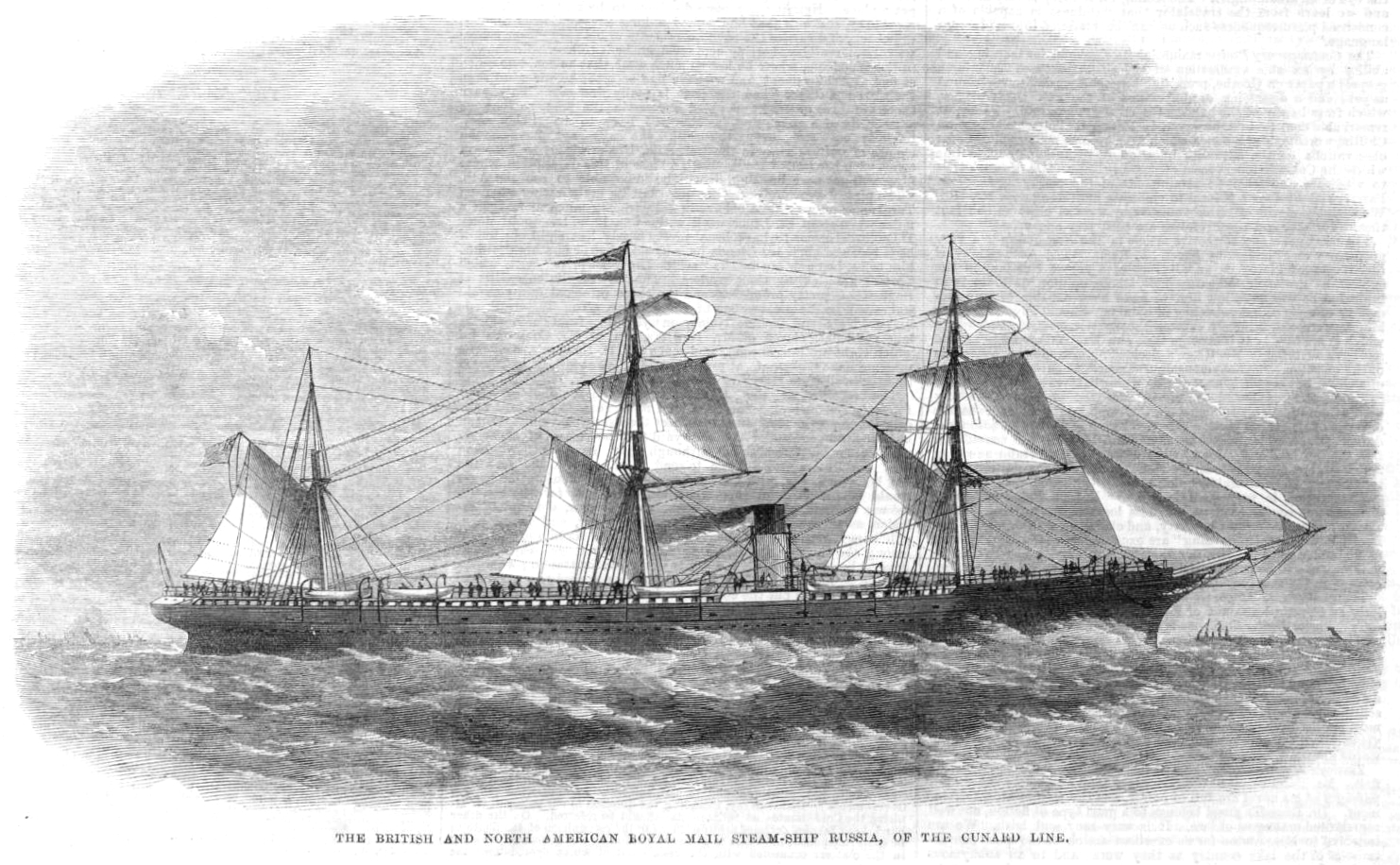
The British and North American Royal Steam-ship 'Russia', of the Cunard Line. Illustrated London News 1867

SS Waesland was a Cunard liner built by J & G Thomson of Glasgow as Russia. She was launched 20 March 1867 and made her maiden voyage in June of the same year. The writer Charles Dickens returned to England on the Russia after his second tour of the United States and was fulsome in his praise of the ship. On 25 May 1869, Russia ran into the ship Figlia Maggiore of Trieste off Bedloes Island, New York City, which sank without loss of life.

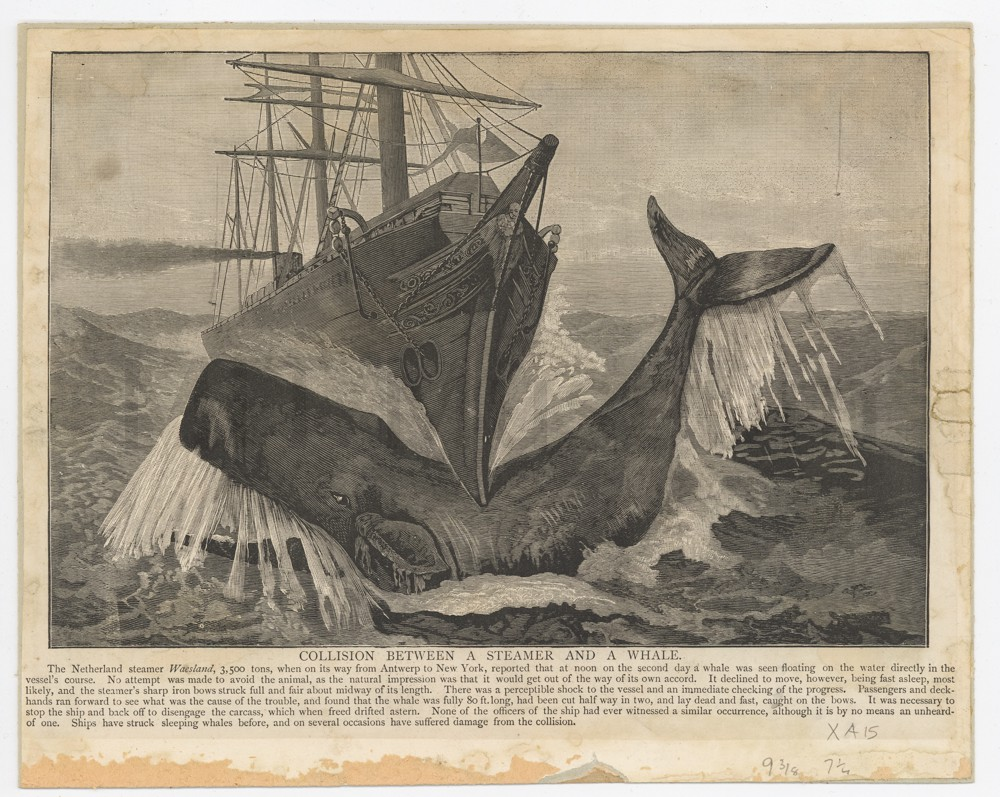
Collision between the Waesland and a whale - The Picture Magazine 1894

She was sold to the Red Star Line in 1880 and renamed Waesland. Red Star replaced her engine with a compound engine which, in 1889, was replaced in turn with a triple expansion engine. In 1895 she was chartered to the American Line for use on their services to Philadelphia. In 1902 she was in collision with the Harmonides, formerly the Woolloomooloo of Lund's Blue Anchor Line, off the coast of Anglesey and sank with the loss of two lives.

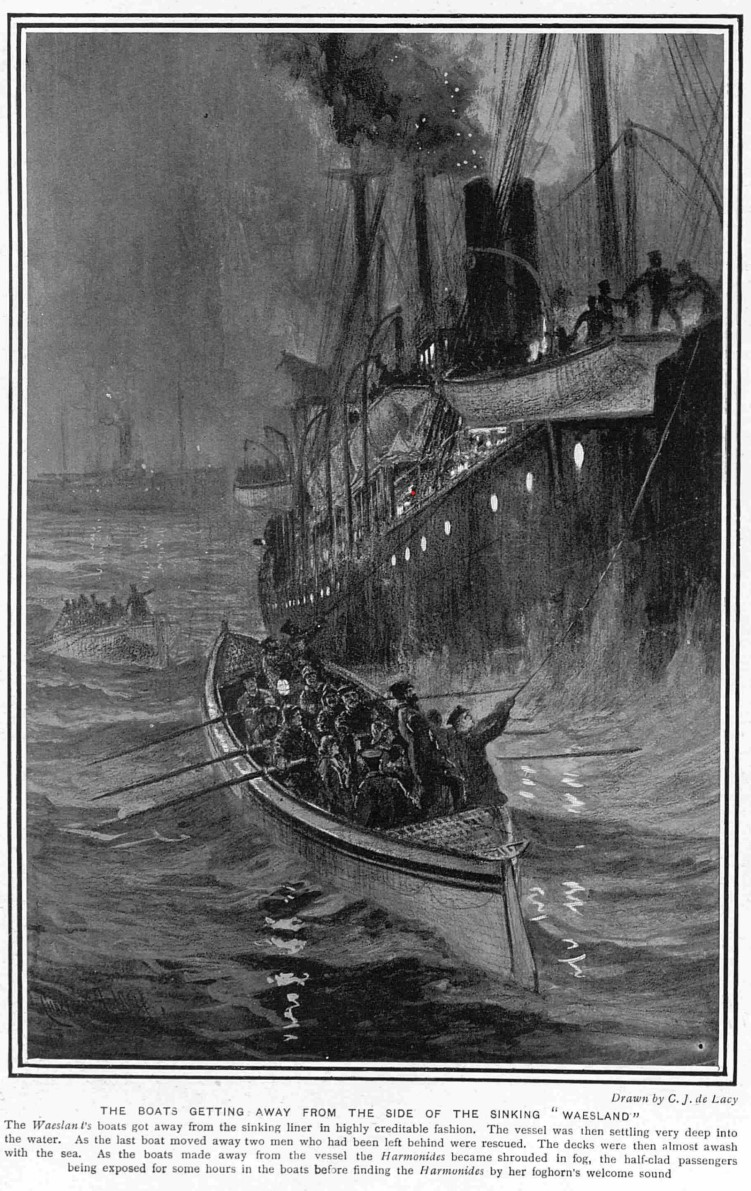
The boats getting away from the side of the sinking Waesland. The Sphere 1902, by Charles de Lacy

For many years a painting of the Russia hung in the London offices of Cunard.
