= USS Fredonia =

Cargo ship of the United States Navy

History

United States
- Name: Fredonia
- Launched: 1845
- Acquired: 14 December 1846
- Commissioned: 5 January 1847
- Decommissioned: 18 January 1851
- Out of service: 13 August 1868
- Fate: Destroyed by earthquake in Peru, 13 August 1868

General characteristics
- Tonnage: 799, or 800
- Length: 160 ft (49 m)
- Beam: 32 ft 11 in (10.03 m)
- Depth of hold: 6 ft 6 in (1.98 m)
- Propulsion: sail
- Complement: 37
- Armament: 4 × 24-pounder carronades

USS Fredonia was an 800-ton bark that served the U.S. Navy as a transport and as a storeship. After several voyages to California by way of Cape Horn, she became the station warehouse in Arica, where she was destroyed by an earthquake.

== Service history ==
Fredonia was built in 1845 at Newbury, Massachusetts. She was registered on 27 May 1845. Her master was George Lunt. Her owners were Micajah Lunt and John Currier of Newbury, and George Lunt and Stephen Frotheringham of Newburypart. The US Navy purchased her at Boston, Massachusetts on 14 December 1846 for $52,000. The vessel was fitted out as a storeship and on 5 January 1847 was placed in commission under command of Lieutenant C. W. Chauncey.

Assigned to the Home Squadron, Fredonia sailed from Boston 9 January 1847 for the east coast of Mexico. On 16 February she arrived off Anton Lizardo where she remained until October, rendering assistance to vessels in distress and performing duty as guard ship while dispensing provisions, wood, water, ordnance equipment, and ammunition to the squadron of Commodores David Conner and Matthew C. Perry engaged in the bombardment and occupation of Vera Cruz, Tuxpan, and Tabasco, Mexico. Before sailing for home on 8 October Fredonia embarked invalids from the squadron and men whose enlistments had expired for transportation to New York City, where she arrived 22 November. The storeship made one more trip to the Gulf of Mexico with supplies for the squadron before the end of the Mexican–American War, departing New York 9 January 1848 and arriving off Sacrificios 9 February. She sailed for home in June, via Pensacola, Florida, to land hospital supplies from Salmadina, and on 23 July arrived at Norfolk, Virginia, to disembark a battalion of U.S. Marines and invalids from the Gulf Squadron.

Fredonia proceeded to New York City in October 1848 to take on a cargo destined for the west coast. She sailed from New York 11 December and on 31 July 1849 arrived in San Francisco Bay, after stopping at Rio de Janeiro, Brazil, Valparaíso, Chile, and Callao, Peru. She remained on the west coast a year, departing San Francisco, California, 4 July 1850, stopping at Valparaíso for urgent repairs and arriving at New York City 7 January 1851. She was decommissioned on the 18th and placed in ordinary at the New York Navy Yard. In 1852 Fredonia transported troops of the 4th Infantry, with equipment and supplies to California. She sailed from New York on 21 November and arrived at San Francisco 19 June 1853. She then proceeded to Valparaíso, Chile, arriving 12 September, and was converted to a permanent storeship for the Pacific Squadron. She served in this capacity fifteen years, stationed at Valparaíso until 1862 when she was towed to Callao, Peru, by Wyoming.

In 1868, owing to yellow fever at Callao, Fredonia was moved to Arica, then on the southern coast of Peru and later part of Chile, where on 13 August she was destroyed by a tsunami. The first severe shock of a violent earthquake occurred about 5:05 p.m., followed by successive shocks and a tremendous tsunami. The U.S. Navy gunboat Wateree, also anchored in the harbor of Arica, was washed ashore, while Fredonia was completely broken up with a loss of 27 lives. Only five of Fredonia's complement survived—three officers, who were on shore, and two enlisted men who were rescued the following morning from a portion of the wreck. The earthquake, reported to be the most devastating and extensive that ever occurred in South America, destroyed not only Arica but a number of other large cities on the west side of the Peruvian Andes Mountains. The officers and men of the United States Squadron, under command of Rear Admiral T. Turner, immediately rushed assistance to the stricken inhabitants of Arica, providing food, clothing and medicines from the ships' supplies and conveying surgeons, nurses, provisions and other necessities from Callao and Valparaíso.
