= USS Pawtuxet =

Gunboat of the United States Navy

History

United States
- Name: USS Pawtuxet
- Builder: Portsmouth Navy Yard
- Launched: 19 March 1864
- Acquired: 18 May 1864
- Commissioned: 26 August 1864
- Decommissioned: 15 June 1865
- Fate: Sold, 15 October 1867

General characteristics
- Class & type: Sassacus-class gunboat
- Tonnage: 974 long tons (990 t)
- Length: 205 ft (62 m)
- Beam: 35 ft (11 m)
- Draft: 9 ft 3 in (2.82 m)
- Depth of hold: 11 ft 6 in (3.51 m)
- Speed: 14 knots (26 km/h; 16 mph)
- Armament: 2 × 100-pounder Parrott rifles; 4 × 9 in (230 mm) Dahlgren smoothbores; 2 × 20-pounder Parrott rifles; 2 × 24-pounder howitzers

USS Pawtuxet was a side wheel steamer of the Union Navy during the American Civil War. Launched by the Portsmouth Navy Yard on 19 March 1864, she was delivered to the Navy at New York City on 18 May 1864, and commissioned on 26 August 1864, Comdr. J. H. Spotts in command. She was named after a river in Rhode Island.

== Service history ==
Following commissioning Pawtuxet was ordered to the Grand Banks to join the quest for the Confederate raider Tallahassee, but before she could get underway Tallahassee had returned safely to Wilmington. Pawtuxet was then ordered south to join the North Atlantic Blockading Squadron. Joining the 3rd Division in October she was ordered to cruise off the Carolina coast, primarily between Capes Lookout and Fear. At the end of December she bombarded the defenses at Wilmington in support of the first assault against Fort Fisher. Returning on 13 January 1865, she again turned her guns on that fort; sent men and boats to participate in the successful assault on the 15th; then resumed blockade duties. Shifted to the Virginia coast in April, she decommissioned at New York on 15 June 1865, and was sold on 15 October 1867.

== See also ==
- Confederate States Navy
- Union Blockade
