= USS Chicopee (1863) =

Gunboat of the United States Navy

History

United States
- Launched: 4 March 1863
- Commissioned: 7 May 1864
- Decommissioned: 19 December 1866
- Fate: sold, 8 October 1867

General characteristics
- Class & type: Sassacus-class gunboat
- Displacement: 974 tons
- Length: 205 ft (62 m)
- Beam: 35 ft (11 m)
- Draft: 6 ft 6 in (1.98 m)
- Depth of hold: 11 ft 6 in (3.51 m)
- Propulsion: steam engine; side wheel-propelled

USS Chicopee was a large steamer acquired by the Union Navy during the American Civil War. She was used by the Navy for various purposes, but especially to patrol navigable waterways of the Confederacy to prevent the South from trading with other countries.

== Service history ==
Chicopee, a double-ended side wheel steamer, was built by Paul Curtis, Boston, Massachusetts; launched 4 March 1863; and commissioned 7 May 1864, Commander A. D. Harell in command. From 10 June 1864 Chicopee sailed off the coast and in the inland waters of North Carolina. She joined in the operations which led to the capture of Plymouth, North Carolina, between 29 October and 1 November 1864. Later she cooperated with the Union Army in the expeditions to Pitch Landing and against Rainbow Bluff, North Carolina, of December 1864.

After overhaul at Norfolk Navy Yard in early 1865, Chicopee returned to North Carolina waters, and resumed her cruising with the North Atlantic Squadron until 24 December 1865 when she arrived at Norfolk Navy Yard. She returned to Wilmington, North Carolina, 23 January 1866, and continued to cruise off the North Carolina coast until 3 December, sailing then for Washington, D.C. She was placed out of commission there 19 December 1866 and sold 8 October 1867.
