= Kuser =

Kuser is a surname. Notable people with the surname include:

- Anthony Dryden Kuser (1924–2014), American theatrical producer and C.I.A. intelligence officer and ambassador
- Anthony R. Kuser (1862–1929), American businessman and philanthropist
- John Dryden Kuser (1897–1964), American politician
