= Forrest F. Dryden =

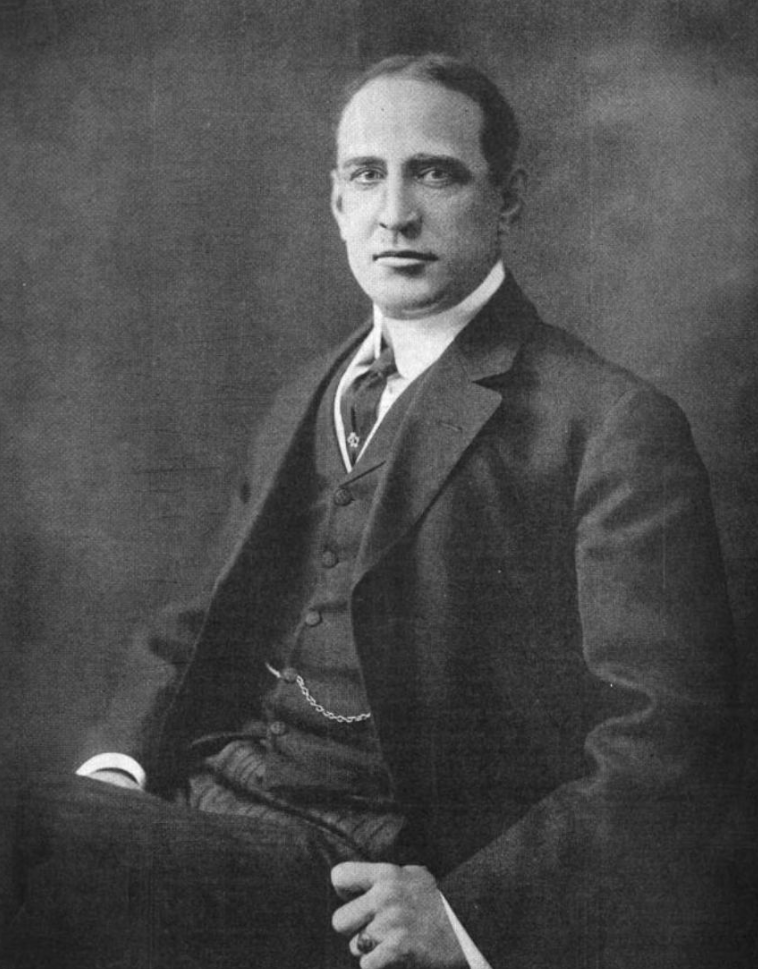

2nd President of Prudential Insurance Company
- In office 1912–1922
- Preceded by: John F. Dryden
- Succeeded by: Edward Dickinson Duffield

Personal details
- Born: Forrest Fairchild Dryden; December 26, 1864; Bedford, Ohio, U.S.
- Died: July 20, 1932 (aged 67); Bernardsville, New Jersey, U.S.
- Spouse: Grace Carlton (m. 1890)
- Children: 3
- Parent(s): John F. Dryden; Cynthia J. Fairchild Dryden
- Education: Newark Academy; Phillips Academy
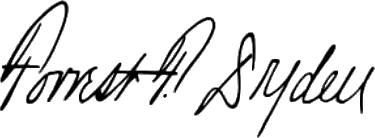
- Signature

Forrest Fairchild Dryden (December 26, 1864 – July 20, 1932) was the president of Prudential Insurance Company of America (now Prudential Financial) from 1912 until 1922. Prudential was founded by his father, John F. Dryden, who was also a United States senator, representing New Jersey.

== Early life ==
Dryden was born in Bedford, Ohio on December 26, 1864. He was the son of John Fairfield Dryden (1839–1911) and Cynthia Jennings (née Fairchild) Dryden (1842–1916). His father, John F. Dryden was the founder and the president of Prudential Insurance Company. His sister, Susan married Anthony R. Kuser. Their son, John Dryden Kuser, Dryden's nephew, was a state senator and Brooke Astor's first husband.

Dryden attended Newark Academy and later Phillips Academy at Andover.

== Career ==
He started working for Prudential Insurance Company in 1888. He became superintendent of the Prudential office in Elizabeth New Jersey in 1889. He joined the board of directors and assumed the duties as assistant secretary in 1890. Later that year he was selected to be secretary of the company. During his father's service as U.S. Senator for New Jersey, Forrest Dryden acted as president of Prudential. Dryden was promoted to third vice president in 1903, second vice president in 1906 and vice president in 1911.

Upon his father's death in 1912, he succeeded him to become president of Prudential. He continued on as president of Prudential until his resignation in 1922 due to ill health, reportedly arising from his "examination before the Lockwood Committee at the hands of Samuel Untermyer." He was succeeded by Prudential's general solicitor and the then acting president, Edward Dickinson Duffield, who had been with the firm since 1906.

=== Affiliations ===
Dryden was a member of the New Jersey National Guard Essex Troop. During his time there, he was the chief commissary on the Major General Staff. He held the rank of lieutenant colonel. He was member of the New Jersey State Rifle Association. He was a member of the Newark Board of Trade. He was also a director of many organizations, including the Public Service Corporation of New Jersey, the Union National Bank of Newark, the South Jersey Gas, Electric and Traction Company and the United States Casualty Company of New York.

== Personal life ==
In 1890, Dryden married Grace Marion Carleton (1865–1936), daughter of Isaac N. Carleton, at her family home in Bradford, Massachusetts. Together, they were the parents of three children, including:

- John Fairfield Dryden II (1893–1947)
- Dorothy Dryden (b. 1899), who married Newcombe Chandler Baker in 1919.
- Elizabeth Dryden (1905–1963)

He died at his home in Bernardsville, New Jersey, on July 20, 1932, due to heart disease.

=== Legacy ===
The Dryden family estate, known as Stronghold, was located in Bernardsville on Bernardsville Mountain. It became the home of Miss Gill's School in 1940 which later became known as Gill St. Bernard's School in 1956. It is currently owned by fashion mogul Marc Ecko.
