= Victor Kravchenko (defector) =

Defector Soviet diplomat (1905–1966)

Viktor Kravchenko Виктор Кравченко
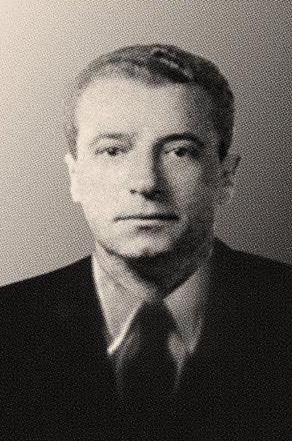
- Born: Виктор Андреевич Кравченко; Victor Andreevich Kravchenko; 11 October 1905; Ekaterinoslav, Russian Empire
- Died: 25 February 1966 (aged 60); Manhattan, New York, United States
- Occupations: Writer, engineer
- Years active: 1944–1966
- Notable work: I Chose Freedom

Viktor Andriyovych Kravchenko (Ukrainian: Ві́ктор Андрі́йович Кра́вченко; 11 October 1905 – 25 February 1966) was a Ukrainian-born Soviet defector, known for writing the best-selling book I Chose Freedom, published in 1946, about the realities of life in the Soviet Union.

Kravchenko defected to the United States during World War II, and began writing about his experiences as an official in the Communist Party of the Soviet Union.

== Early life ==
Victor Andreevich Kravchenko was born on 11 October 1905, into a Ukrainian family in Ekaterinoslav, Russian Empire (now Dnipro, Ukraine) with a non-party, revolutionary father. Kravchenko became an engineer specializing in metallurgy, and while studying at the Dneprodzerzhinsk Metallurgical Institute he became friends with future Soviet leader Leonid Brezhnev. An enthusiastic Communist Party of the Soviet Union member who joined the party in 1929, Kravchenko later became disillusioned by witnessing the effects of collectivization while working in the steel mills of the Donbas region in his native Ukraine, and his personal mistreatment during the Great Purge, although he ultimately managed to avoid arrest. During World War II, Kravchenko served as a captain in the Soviet Army until 1943, when he was posted to the Soviet Purchasing Commission in Washington, D.C.

== Defection ==
On 4 April 1944, Kravchenko abandoned his post and requested political asylum in the United States. However, the Soviet authorities demanded his immediate extradition, calling him a traitor, and ambassador Joseph E. Davies appealed to President Franklin D. Roosevelt directly on behalf of Joseph Stalin to have Kravchenko extradited. He was granted asylum, but lived under a pseudonym thereafter, fearing assassination by Soviet agents.

Kravchenko began a relationship with an American woman, Cynthia Kuser-Earle, daughter of Anthony R. Kuser (1862–1929) and sister of New Jersey State Senator John Dryden Kuser, who was married to Brooke Astor from 1919 to 1930. Viktor and Cynthia created a family, but never married. They had two sons, Anthony and Andrew, who were obliged to live under their mother's arranged married name (Earle), and they remained unaware of their father's identity until 1965. When Kravchenko defected, he had a wife, Zinaida Gorlova, and a son, Valentin (born 1935), who remained in the Soviet Union. Gorlova remarried and her second husband adopted Valentin, who changed his last name to that of his stepfather's to remove the stigma of his father. In spite of his new surname, Valentin was eventually publicized as the son of a "traitor to the motherland" and for various other reasons was sent to a Gulag in 1982 for six years, where the conditions of the camp drove him to the point where he tried to commit suicide in his cell. Valentin applied for political asylum in America after discovering that his half-brother Andrew lived there (the other American son, Anthony, had died in 1969). The two half-brothers were reunited in Arizona in 1992 at an emotional press conference. Valentin died in 2001 from heart failure, receiving his American citizenship on the day he died.

== I Chose Freedom ==
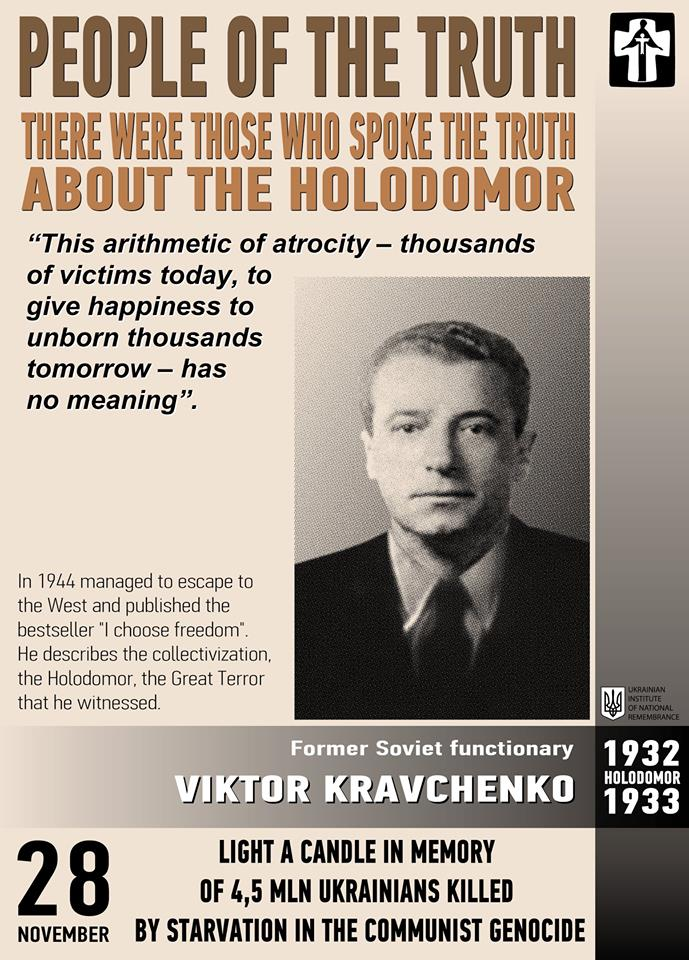
Poster featuring Victor Kravchenko (2015)

Kravchenko wrote a memoir, I Chose Freedom, a best-seller both in the US and Europe, containing extensive revelations on collectivization in the Soviet Union, the Soviet prison camp system, and the use of penal labor which came at a time of growing tension between the Soviet Union and the West. The publication of I Chose Freedom was met with vocal attacks from the Soviet Union and by international Communist parties. Kravchenko had made a deal prior to working with journalist Eugene Lyons, that Lyons would not receive credit, only a percentage of royalties.

== Trial of the Century ==
Kravchenko's lesser-known memoir, although a best seller in Europe, I Chose Justice, published in 1950, mainly covered his "trial of the century" in France. An attack on Kravchenko's character by the French Communist weekly Les Lettres Françaises resulted in him suing them for libel in a French court. The extended 1949 trial featuring hundreds of witnesses was dubbed "The Trial of the Century". The Soviet Union flew in Kravchenko's former colleagues to denounce him, accusing him of being a traitor, a draft dodger, and an embezzler. His ex-wife appeared as well, accusing him of being physically abusive and sexually impotent. When a KGB officer alleged that he had been found mentally deficient, Kravchenko jumped to his feet and screamed, "We are not in Moscow! If you were not a witness, I'd tear your head off!". In a convincing case, Kravchenko's lawyers presented witnesses who had survived the Soviet prison camp system, including Margarete Buber-Neumann, a survivor of both Soviet and Nazi concentration camps and the widow of German Communist Heinz Neumann, who had been shot during the Great Purge. The court ultimately ruled that Kravchenko had been unfairly libeled, and was awarded only symbolic damages. In the view of one close observer, Alexander Werth,

Technically, Kravchenko won his case… which brought worldwide attention to the cause and damaged the Communist Party in France. Although he did not receive the cost he had asked for, he did cover his trial expenses and beyond.

Les Lettres Françaises appealed the verdict. A higher French court upheld the verdict but reduced the fine from 50,000 francs to 3 francs, or less than US$1, on the grounds that trial publicity had helped Kravchenko sell books.

== Later years ==
As a social democrat and member of the anti-Stalinist Left since the 1940s, Kravchenko felt increasingly alienated by American political polarisation into anti-Marxist social conservatives and the militantly anti-Cold War New Left. He later lived in Peru and New York City. His South American business ventures failed. A sympathetic biographer, Gary Kern, has suggested that the KGB may have played a covert role in their failure.

== Death ==
On 25 February 1966, Kravchenko was found dead from a gunshot wound to his head at his desk in his apartment in Manhattan. Kravchenko's death was officially ruled a suicide, and this view is widely accepted, including by biographer Gary Kern.

FBI files obtained by Kern after a six-year lawsuit reveal that President Lyndon B. Johnson had very strong suspicions about Kravchenko's suicide. For this reason, Johnson ordered the FBI to investigate and determine for certain if his suicide note was authentic or a Soviet forgery. The FBI eventually ruled that the note was authentic, yet some details concerning Kravchenko's last days remain questionable, and his son Andrew still believes his father could have been a victim of a KGB assassination. Andrew Kravchenko produced a documentary film in 2008, The Defector, about his father. Kravchenko's decision to defect from the Soviet Union resulted in family members he left behind facing harassment, imprisonment and even death, with more than 30 relatives of Kravchenko being killed in the Soviet Union as a reprisal for his defection. It is known that Kravchenko's location was discovered by NKVD agents in 1944, notably Mark Zborowski, and subsequently closely monitored by the NKVD and later by KGB special operations. (Note: Kravchenko was in hiding after his defection. He was given the covername KOMAR/GNAT by Soviet agents. See the Venona project documents on the National Security Agency, especially New York to Moscow messages of May to August 1944, nos. 594, 600, 613–14, 654, 694, 724, 726, 740, 799, and 907.)

== Books ==
- I Chose Freedom: The Personal and Political Life of a Soviet Official (1946) Charles Scribner's Sons, New York
- I Chose Justice (1950) Charles Scribner, New York
- Kravchenko Versus Moscow: The Report of the Famous Paris Case (1950) London and New York, Wingate
- Kern, Gary (2007) The Kravchenko Case: One Man's War On Stalin, Enigma Books, ISBN 978-1-929631-73-5

== See also ==
- List of Eastern Bloc defectors
- Soviet-German cooperation during World War II
