= Richenthal =

Richenthal may refer to:

- Richenthal, Lucerne, a former municipality in the canton of Lucerne, Switzerland, now part of the municipality of Reiden
- Ulrich of Richenthal (died c. 1438), chronicler of the Council of Constance
- David Richenthal, lawyer and Broadway theater producer

== See also ==
- Reichenthal
