= Isaac N. Carleton =

American educator (1832–1902)

- Born: Isaac Newton Carleton; June 10, 1832; Bradford, Massachusetts, U.S.
- Died: August 8, 1902 (aged 70); Haverhill, Massachusetts, U.S.
- Education: Phillips Academy; Dartmouth College
- Occupation: Educator
- Spouse: Laura Tenney Carleton
- Children: Grace, Clara, Walter and Theodore

Isaac Newton Carleton (June 10, 1832 – August 8, 1902) was an educator. He taught at Phillips Academy and was the principal of State Normal School in New Britain, Connecticut for twelve years. He was the founder of Carleton School in Massachusetts. He was the president of the American Institute of Instruction for two years.

== Youth and education ==
Carleton was born in Bradford (now part of Haverhill), Massachusetts on June 10, 1832, to Isaac Carleton and Mary Richardson Carleton. He attended Phillips Academy in Andover, Massachusetts from 1852 to 1855. He completed his BA at Dartmouth College in 1859.

== Family ==
Carleton married Laura Tenney Carleton August 8, 1860 in Hartford, Vermont. They raised four children, Grace, Clara, Walter and Theodore. Grace married Forrest F. Dryden, son of New Jersey Senator John F. Dryden. Walter was one of the three founding directors of NEC Corporation, the first Japanese joint venture with foreign capital. Theodore attended Yale University, graduating in 1896.

== Career ==
He went back to Phillips Academy to teach Latin and Greek from 1859 to 1863. He was principal at Peabody High School in 1864. In 1865, Carleton was an associate principal for a young ladies' seminary in Lexington, Massachusetts. He was the acting principal of the State Normal School (now Central Connecticut State University) in New Britain, Connecticut during the summer session of 1866. He was the principal of a young ladies' home and day school in Medford) Massachusetts in 1866 to 1869. This would be later known as Carleton School.

He returned to the New Britain State Normal School as its fifth principal in 1869. During his years there, the school was reported to have recovered the reputation that had been jeopardized by its closure in the 1867 Connecticut State General Assembly. He received an honorary MA from Yale University in 1872. He was selected as President of the American Institute of Instruction in 1878. He served at the New Britain Normal School until 1881. He returned to Bradford, Massachusetts as principal of Carleton School from 1884 to 1901. His school earned an endorsement from Phillips Academy at Andover. He received an honorary Ph.D. from Dartmouth in 1889.

Carleton died August 8, 1902, in Haverhill, Massachusetts.

== Carleton School ==
Carleton School was a college preparatory boarding school in Massachusetts. There are three notable periods that defined Carleton School; it was originally a girls' school, later was a boys' school, and became a military school at the end of its operation. In 1868, the school was located in Medford, Massachusetts. It was called I.N. Carleton's Home and Day School for Young Ladies.

In 1869, Carleton set aside running a private school and went to the New Britain State Normal School (now Central Connecticut State University) in New Britain, Connecticut as its fifth principal. He served there until 1881.

In 1884, Carleton started a new private school. It was referred to as I.N. Carleton's Home and Day School for Boys in 1886, located in Bradford Massachusetts. This was the longest and most defining period in its operation as a boys' preparatory school. By 1896, it was simply called Carleton School. The last period of the school's existence was possibly the most dramatic change.

It was renamed The Carleton Military School in approximately 1901. Carleton still held the position of principal, but a Major Baker ran the military instruction, having previously been a military instructor at Harvard University summer school. Carleton died 8 August 1902, two months after the expected end of the school year. The location of the school continued to be used as a boarding house, called the Carleton House for Boys and Young Men in approximately 1925. The school buildings still stand near the corner of Chadwick and South Main Street in Haverhill, and are used as apartments.

== American Institute of Instruction ==
Upon his selection as its president, the National Journal of Education was quoted: "In the election of Prof. I. N. Carleton, principal of the State Normal School of New Britain as President of the American Institute of instruction, a wise choice has been made. It is a deserved honor to the Normal school fraternity of New England, as well as a compliment to Mr. Carleton's ability as an educator. He is energetic and enthusiastic, and will spare no efforts to make his administration useful and successful."

== See also ==
- Central Connecticut State University
- Peabody Public Schools
- Phillips Academy
