= John H. Russell Jr. =

United States Marine Corps general

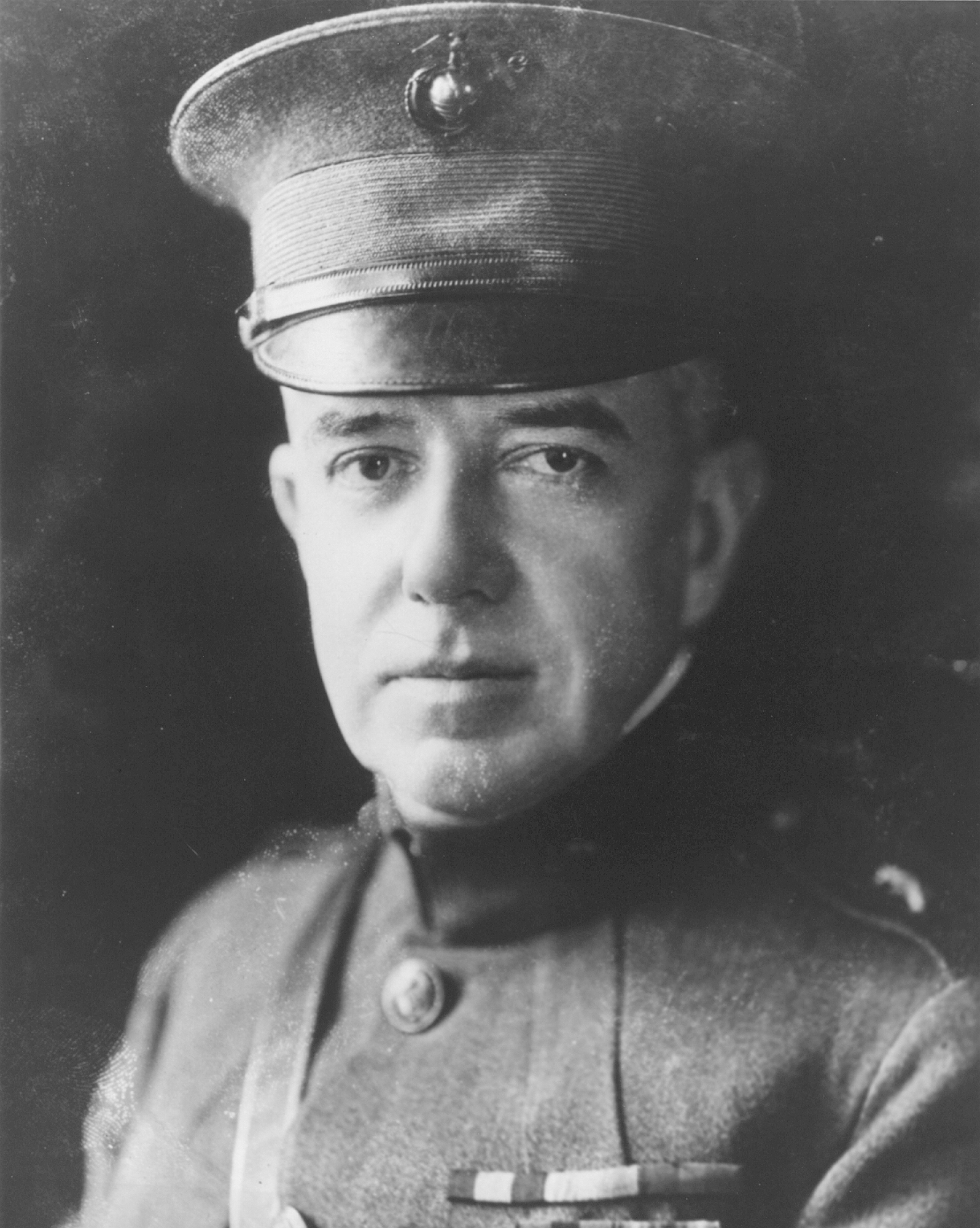
- 16th Commandant of the Marine Corps (1934–1936)
- Born: John Henry Russell Jr. November 14, 1872; Mare Island, California, U.S.
- Died: March 6, 1947 (aged 74); Coronado, California, U.S.
- Burial place: Arlington National Cemetery
- Spouse: Mabel Cecile Hornby Howard
- Military career
- Allegiance: United States
- Branch: Marine Corps
- Service years: 1892–1894 (U.S. Navy); 1894–1936 (U.S. Marine Corps)
- Rank: Major general
- Conflicts: Spanish–American War; Banana Wars; Occupation of the Dominican Republic; Occupation of Haiti
- Awards: Navy Cross; Navy Distinguished Service Medal
- Other work: Military journalist

John Henry Russell Jr. (November 14, 1872 – March 6, 1947) was a major general and 16th Commandant of the Marine Corps.

His only child was Brooke Astor, a noted philanthropist, who lived to be 105.

== Early life ==
Russell was born on November 14, 1872, in Mare Island, California, the son of Rear Admiral John Henry Russell (1827–1897). He was appointed to the United States Naval Academy by President Grover Cleveland in May 1888 and graduated from the academy in June 1892 and after two years at sea. He passed his final examinations and was transferred to the Marine Corps as a second lieutenant on July 1, 1894.

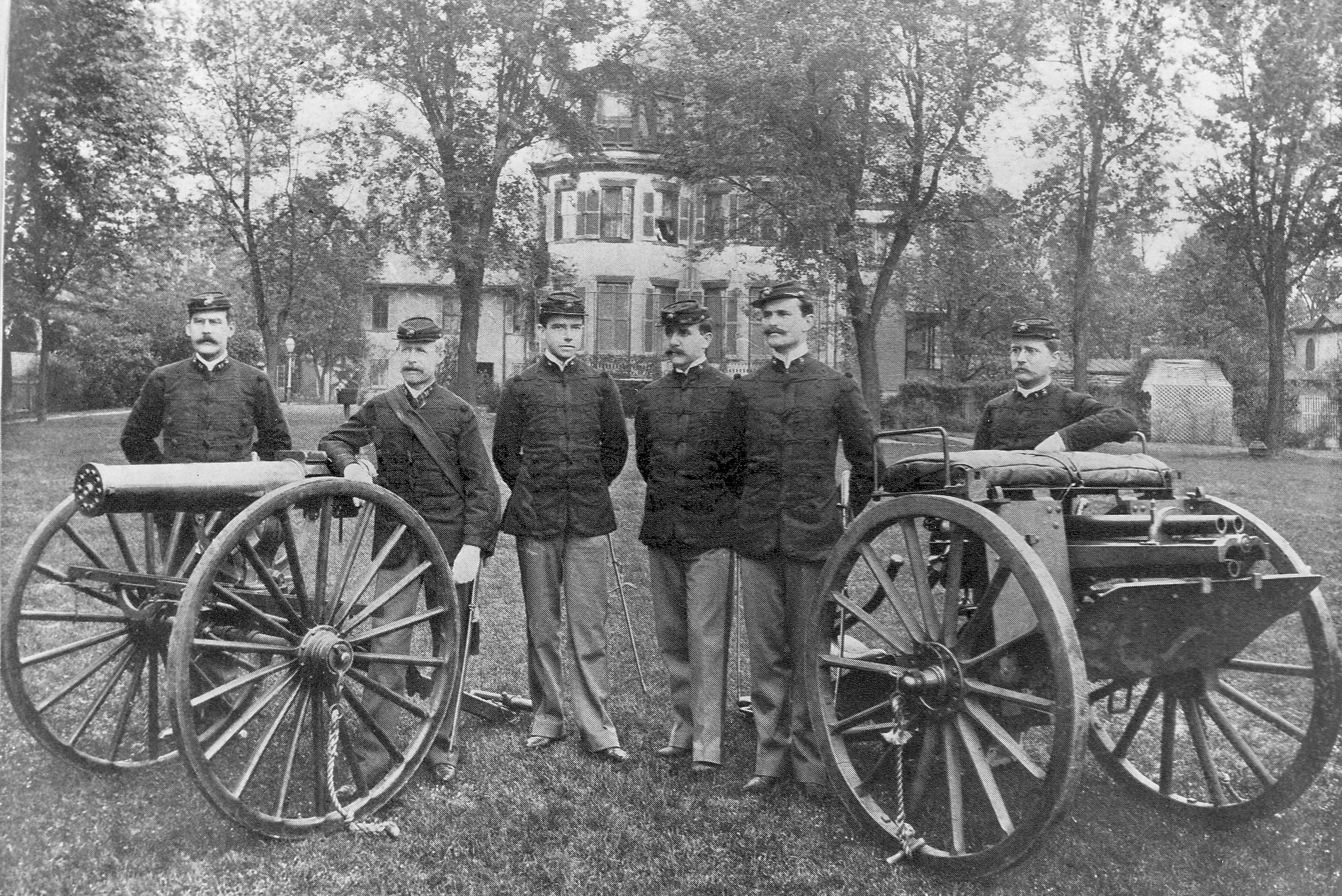
USMC officers stationed at Marine Barracks, Washington, D.C., in 1896. Then-Second Lieutenant Russell is third from the left.

Upon appointment as an officer in the Marine Corps, he attended the School of Application at the Marine Barracks, Washington, D.C., graduating in 1895. He was retained for another year at the school to conduct a class for noncommissioned officers.

== Career ==
=== Early career ===
In 1896, he joined USS Massachusetts, North Atlantic Squadron, serving on board until after the Spanish–American War. The commanding officer of the vessel addressed a letter to the Secretary of the Navy commenting favorably on the conduct and performance of duty of John H. Russell in action and recommending recognition thereof by the Navy Department.

He next performed duty on Guam and upon his return to the United States was placed in charge of the School of Application for Officers at the Marine Barracks, Washington, D.C. Following this tour of duty, and also duty at several navy yards, he was ordered to command the Marine Detachment, USS Oregon, remaining on board from September 1902 to March 1904. His next shore duty was in command of the school for young officers established at the Marine Barracks, Annapolis, Maryland. In 1906, he was transferred to the Marine Barracks, Naval Station, Honolulu, Territory of Hawaii. From that duty he was ordered to Camp Elliott, Panama Canal Zone, to command the Marines at that station.

In September 1908, he joined the Naval War College, Newport, Rhode Island, for duty as a member of the staff of that college, remaining there until 1910, and it was during this tour of service that the "applicatory method" of instruction was put into effect.

He commanded the Marine Detachment, American Legation, Peking, China, from November 14, 1910, to April 30, 1913. The change in the Chinese government from an empire to a republic, which took place during this period, and the attendant disorders in and around Peking made this tour of duty particularly interesting and difficult.

Upon his return to the United States, he was assigned duty in the Office of Naval Intelligence, Navy Department, where he served until 1917, with the exception of a tour of duty (temporary) from April 30 to December 5, 1914, commanding the 2d Battalion, 3d Regiment, U.S. Marines at Verz Cruz, Mexico, being detached to the United States Army during the period.

=== West Indies service ===
Early in March 1917, he assumed command of the 3rd Regiment, with headquarters in Santo Domingo City, Dominican Republic, and within a short period of time he was detached and ordered to command the 4th Regiment of Marines with headquarters at Santiago de los Caballeros, where he remained until October 1917, when he was detached and ordered to the Republic of Haiti to command the Marine Brigade serving in that country. He served in that capacity until December 7, 1918.

His repeated efforts for a transfer to detachments serving in France during World War I were finally successful, but delay in arrival of his relief in Haiti did not permit transfer from Port-au-Prince until after the Armistice was signed.

Upon arrival in Washington, he was ordered to duty in command of the "Planning Section" at Headquarters Marine Corps and served in that capacity until September 1919, when he again was ordered to duty in Haiti to command the 1st Brigade of Marines, serving in that capacity until February 1922, when, upon the unanimous recommendation to the President by the U.S. Senate Committee that had been investigating affairs in Haiti, he was appointed American High Commissioner to Haiti with the rank of Ambassador Extraordinary. Maj. Gen. Russell served with distinction in Haiti as High Commissioner until November 1930.

=== Later career ===
Upon his return to the United States, he was assigned to duty as Commanding General, Marine Corps Base, San Diego, California, and was transferred to command the Marine Barracks, Quantico, Virginia, in December 1931. He was detailed as Assistant Commandant of the Marine Corps at Headquarters Marine Corps in February 1933. Major General Russell was appointed Commandant of the Marine Corps on March 1, 1934, and remained in that position until his retirement December 1, 1936.

During Major General Russell's tenure as Commandant of the Marine Corps, the old system of seniority promotions of officers was changed to that of advancement by selection; the 1st Marine Brigade was withdrawn from Haiti; the Fleet Marine Force assumed a new importance; the Reserves were given more attention; and the number of ships carrying Marine detachments continued to increase.

=== Retirement ===
Major General Russell retired after 42 years of commissioned service and continued in an active career as a military journalist.

He was a hereditary member of the Military Order of the Loyal Legion of the United States in succession to his father.

== Personal life ==
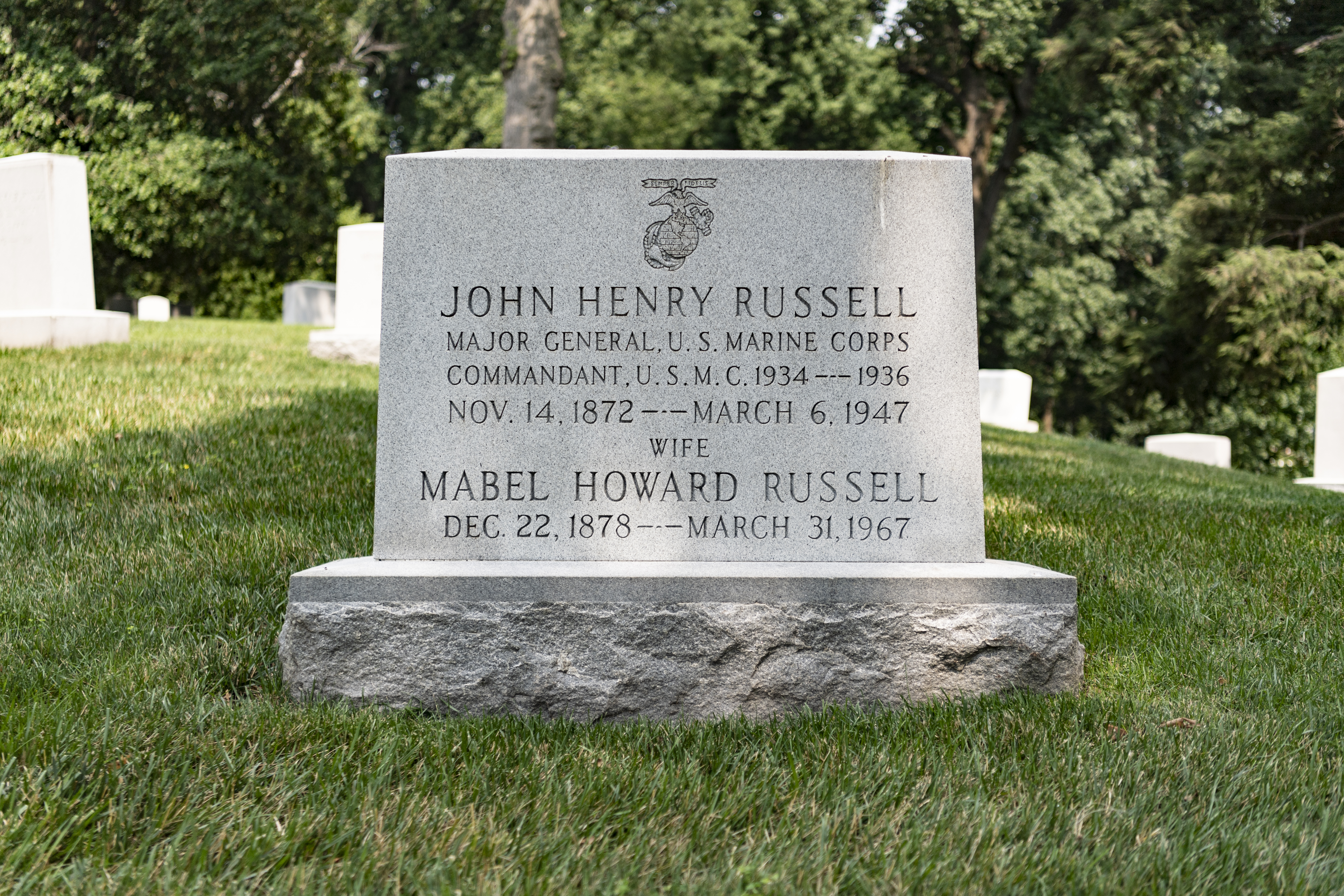
Grave at Arlington National Cemetery

While stationed at the Marine Barracks in Washington, D.C., he married Mabel Cecile Hornby Howard (1879–1967) on June 12, 1901. Together, they had one child:

- Roberta Brooke Russell (1902–2007), who was married to John Dryden Kuser from 1919 until their divorce in 1930. She then married Charles Henry Marshall in 1932. They remained married until his death in 1952. She lastly married William Vincent Astor in 1953. They remained married until his death in 1959.
  - Anthony Dryden "Tony" Kuser (1924–2014)
    - Alexander R. Marshall (born May 14, 1953)
    - Philip Cryan Marshall (born May 14, 1953)

Russell died in Coronado, California, on March 6, 1947, and was buried in Arlington National Cemetery.

== Namesakes ==
The guided missile destroyer USS Russell (DDG-59) was named for him and his father.

Russell Avenue at the west end of the Marine Corps Recruit Depot (MCRD) San Diego parade deck was named for General Russell.

== Awards and decorations ==
In addition to numerous letters of commendation on his excellent performance of duty during his long and varied career, Maj. Gen. Russell was awarded:

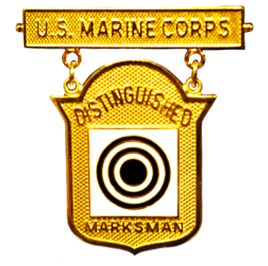

Navy Cross	Navy Distinguished Service Medal	Sampson Medal
Marine Corps Expeditionary Medal	Spanish Campaign Medal	Mexican Service Medal
World War I Victory Medal with "West Indies" clasp	Haitian Campaign Medal	Haitian Military Medal
Marine Corps Distinguished Marksman Badge

=== Navy Cross citation ===
Citation:

The President of the United States of America takes pleasure in presenting the Navy Cross to Colonel John Henry Russell (MCSN: 0-854), United States Marine Corps, for distinguished service in the line of his profession in able administration of the First Provisional Brigade of Marines in Haiti, and for wisdom and tact in all his dealings with the officials of the Haitian Government and people.

== Promotions ==
- Second lieutenant, July 1, 1894
- First lieutenant, August 10, 1898
- Captain, March 3, 1899
- Major, June 6, 1906
- Lieutenant colonel, August 29, 1916
- Colonel, March 26, 1917
- Brigadier general, January 1, 1922
- Major general, September 1, 1933
- Major General Commandant on March 1, 1934.

Military offices
Preceded by Maj. Gen. Ben Hebard Fuller	Commandant of the United States Marine Corps; 1934–1936	Succeeded by Lt. Gen. Thomas Holcomb
