= I Chose Freedom =

Book by Viktor Kravchenko

- Author: Viktor Kravchenko
- Publisher: Scribners
- Publication date: 1947

I Chose Freedom: The Personal Political Life of a Soviet Official is a book by the Soviet Ukrainian defector Viktor Kravchenko. It was a bestseller in the United States and Europe. The book was written in 1946 and published in 1947. A review was published in The New York Times that year. I Chose Freedom depicts many episodes in Soviet history, including the Soviet famine of 1932–1933, the Gulag system, and the Molotov–Ribbentrop Pact (1939).

The book received support from the Information Research Department (IRD), a secret branch of the UK Foreign Office which specialised in disinformation, anti-communism, and pro-colonial propaganda. Through the IRD, the British government bought the foreign rights to I Chose Freedom and then deployed their agents to promote both the author and its works both within Britain and across the globe.

It depicted collectivization in the USSR and caused a serious strike to the communist regime and Stalin. It depicted the crimes of the Stalinist regime, in particular the Famine of 1932-1933, the Gulag, the cooperation of the governments of Joseph Stalin and Adolf Hitler and the Holodomor. It was reprinted many times, including decades after its first publication, at least in 2007, 2008, 2012, 2016, 2022.

It was published:

- 73 times in English
- 42 times in French
- 28 times in German
- 27 times in Spanish
- some times in Italian
- Several times in Ukrainian

Western researchers often refer to it.

It has at least 50 references in other books.

The book is still popular.
