= Anthony R. Kuser =

- Born: Anthony Rudolph Kuser; May 12, 1862; Newark, New Jersey
- Died: February 8, 1929 (aged 66); West Palm Beach, Florida
- Spouse: Susan Fairchild Dryden
- Children: John Dryden Kuser; Cynthia Dryden Kuser
- Relatives: John Fairfield Dryden (father-in-law)

Anthony Rudolph Kuser (May 12, 1862 – February 8, 1929) was a businessman and philanthropist who donated the land that makes up New Jersey's highest point and had the monument there built as a war memorial.

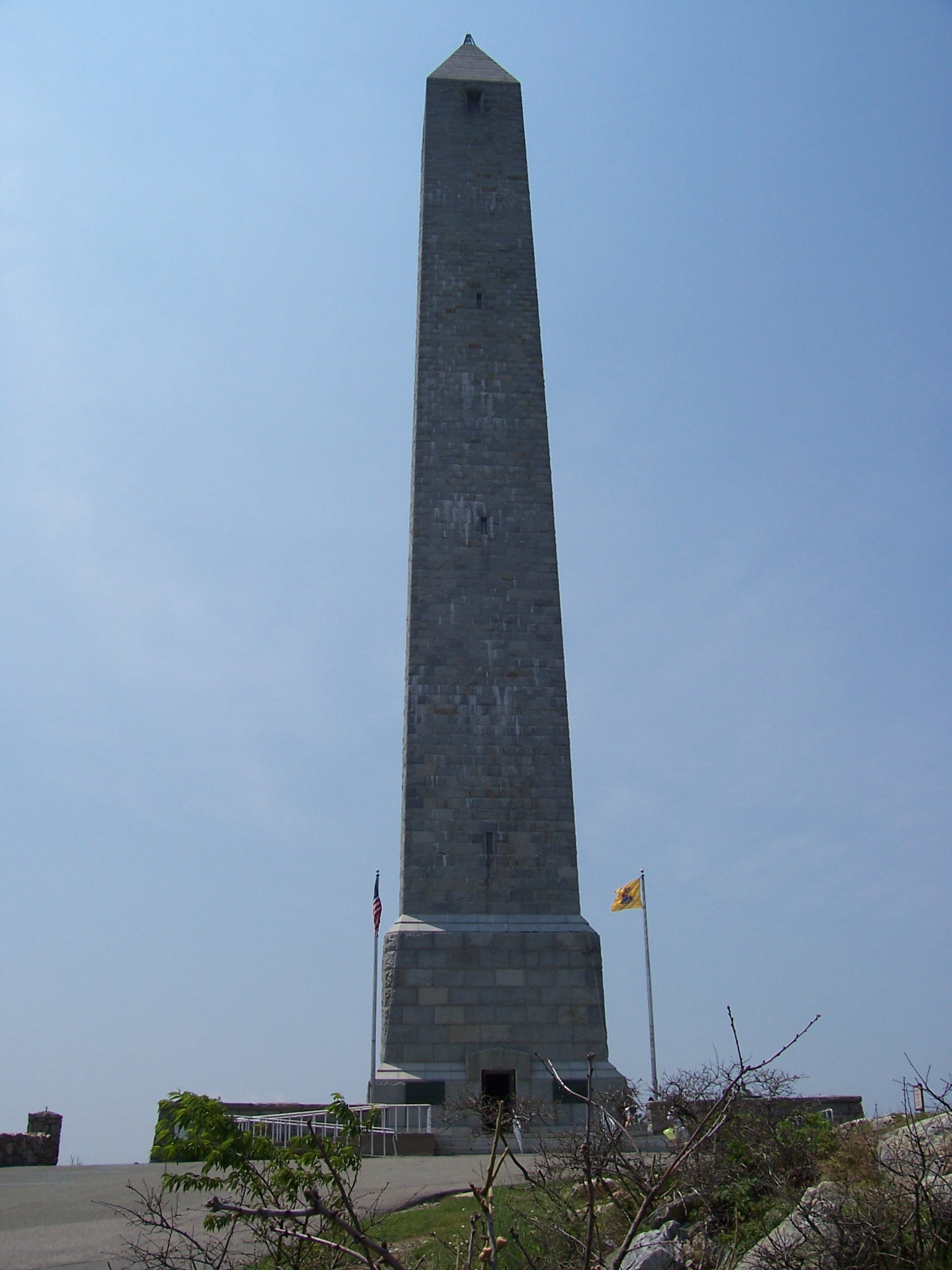
Monument on High Point, New Jersey

== Early life ==
Anthony Rudolph Kuser was born on May 12, 1862, in Newark, New Jersey, to Rudolph Kuser (1818–1891) and Rosalie Prieth (1833–1923). His father was originally from Küsnacht on Lake Zurich, emigrating to the United States in 1844. His mother was born in Innsbruck, Austria.

He moved with his family at age 5 to Trenton, New Jersey. His siblings included Frederick Kuser (1859–1937), John Louis Kuser (1862–1937), his twin and the secretary-treasurer of Mercer automobiles, Rudolph Victor Kuser (1865–1931), Louise Kuser (1867–1951), and Benedict Charles Kuser (1870–1930).

He was educated in the parochial schools of Newark and public schools of Hamilton Township, where he studied engineering.

== Career ==
He organized the Trenton Hygeia Ice Company, the Trenton Brewery Company, and was instrumental in consolidating all the gas and electric companies of Trenton. Along with his twin brother, John L. Kuser, he was the leading spirit in the purchase of the Trenton Street Railway Company.

He was president of the South Jersey Gas and Electric Lighting Company, and he originated the idea of manufacturing coke at Camden, and of piping the gas to Trenton. At the time, it was the longest piping line of its kind in the world.

In 1889, he was appointed the personal staff of Governor Leon Abbett, where he received a nickname of "Colonel". He would serve in a similar capacity for Governors George T. Werts and John W. Griggs. He served on the board of railroad assessors and was nominated for state senator from Mercer county, but refused to accept.

In 1909, he financed the Kuser-William Beebe Expedition to study birds in Ceylon, India, Burma, the Malay States, Java, Borneo, China and Japan. In 1916, he also gave $100,000 to fund a series of volumes on pheasants.

In 1910, he purchased the High Point Inn from the estate of Charles St. John and proceeded to remodel it into his personal home although he rarely used it.

In 1915, he lent $200,000 to William Fox to establish Fox Film Corporation, later merged into 20th Century Fox. He would remain on the Fox board until his death.

== Personal life ==
On December 1, 1896, he married Susie Fairfield Dryden (1862–1932), daughter of Senator and Prudential Insurance founder John Fairfield Dryden. Together, they had two children, both of whom grew up in the family mansion in Bernardsville, New Jersey which still stands:

- John Dryden Kuser (1897–1964), a New Jersey state senator who was the first husband of Brooke Astor (1902–2007)
- Cynthia Dryden Kuser (1910–1985), who was first married to Theodore Wilhelm Herbst, with whom she had a daughter (born 1943). After World War II, Cynthia served as a translator in refugee work in Europe and managed Dryden Press in New York. She later married Arthur Hinkley Earle (1896–1971), but had a relationship with Victor Kravchenko (1905–1966), a Soviet defector with whom she had two sons, Anthony (born 1947) and Andrew (born 1950).

In 1916, a Kuser, bought a 250 acre estate in Bernardsville, New Jersey called Blythewood from Henry Rudolph Kunhardt (1860–1923) that was designed by Henry Rutgers Marshall and thought to be worth at least $250,000. After they purchased the home, they had it renovated by Hoppin & Koen and renamed Faircourt. In 1921, the Kusers were drugged in their sleep and robbed of $20,000 in jewels.

On February 8, 1929, Kuser died at his estate, Los Incas, a 12-bedroom six-acre oceanfront palazzo estate in the Venetian style in West Palm Beach. His funeral was attended by many of the days most important men, including the ambassador to Spain and two former governors. After buying the property from subsequent owners in 1978, Los Incas was torn down by Robert W. Gottfried and replaced it with 10 demi-ones which sold for about $3 million each.

=== Philanthropy ===
In 1922, he donated his home at High Point along with 10,500 acres (42 km^{2}) for a state park. In 1927, he selected an architect to design a war memorial on the summit to be modeled on the Bunker Hill Monument. The obelisk was still under construction when he died at his estate in West Palm Beach in 1929. Kuser's mansion at High Point fell into disrepair and was torn down in 1995.
