= Anthony Dryden Marshall =

American WWII veteran, CIA officer, diplomat, and convicted criminal (1924–2014)

- Marshall in 2009

United States Ambassador to Seychelles
- In office April 1, 1976 – April 26, 1977
- President: Gerald Ford
- Preceded by: Created
- Succeeded by: Wilbert John LeMelle

United States Ambassador to Kenya
- In office December 19, 1973 – April 26, 1977
- President: Gerald Ford (1974–1977); Richard Nixon (1973–1974)
- Preceded by: Robinson McIlvaine
- Succeeded by: Wilbert John LeMelle

United States Ambassador to Trinidad and Tobago
- In office February 15, 1972 – December 27, 1973
- President: Richard Nixon
- Preceded by: J. Fife Symington Jr.
- Succeeded by: Lloyd I. Miller

United States Ambassador to Madagascar
- In office December 15, 1969 – June 1, 1971
- President: Richard Nixon
- Preceded by: David S. King
- Succeeded by: Joseph Mendenhall

Personal details
- Born: Anthony Dryden Kuser; May 30, 1924 New York City, U.S.
- Died: November 30, 2014 (aged 90) New York City, U.S.
- Spouses: Elizabeth Cynthia Cryan (m. 1947, divorced) Thelma Hoegnell (m. 1962; div. 1992) Charlene T. Gilbert (m. 1992)
- Children: 2
- Parents: John Dryden Kuser; Brooke Astor
- Education: Brooks School
- Alma mater: Brown University
- Awards: Purple Heart

Military service
- Allegiance: United States
- Branch: United States Marine Corps
- Rank: Lieutenant
- Battles/wars: World War II; Battle of Iwo Jima

Anthony Dryden Marshall (né Kuser; May 30, 1924 – November 30, 2014) was an American theatrical producer, C.I.A. intelligence officer and ambassador. After being convicted of financially exploiting his mother Brooke Astor, Marshall was sentenced to prison, and stayed there for eight weeks in 2013 until receiving medical parole. He died on November 30, 2014, at the age of 90.

== Early life and family ==
Known as Tony, Marshall was the only child of the American philanthropist Brooke Astor and her first husband, New Jersey state senator John Dryden Kuser. Marshall was the stepson of Charles H. Marshall (his mother's second husband, whose surname he adopted at the age of 18).

By his father's second marriage, he had a half-sister, Suzanne Dryden Kuser (born November 24, 1931), who served with the U.S. Department of State, was an intelligence officer with the Central Intelligence Agency, and has been a consultant to the National Security Agency. He also had two stepsiblings, Peter Marshall and Helen Huntington Marshall (born April 6, 1918), wife of the composer Ernest Schelling and later of the cellist János Scholz.

Marshall attended Brooks School in North Andover, Massachusetts. After enlisting in 1942 during World War II, he served with the U.S. Marine Corps (his grandfather John H. Russell Jr. had served as commandant of the Marine Corps before the war) and led his platoon in the battle of Iwo Jima, attaining the rank of captain and earning a Purple Heart. After the end of the war he enrolled in Brown University.

== Career ==
Marshall entered the foreign service in 1950. He was the U.S. consul in Istanbul, Turkey (1958–1959). During the Nixon administration he served as the U.S. ambassador to the Malagasy Republic (1969–1971). Later he served as ambassador to Trinidad and Tobago (1972–1974) and Kenya (1973) as well as to the Seychelles (1976) during the Ford administration. He was also appointed special assistant to Richard Mervin Bissell Jr. to oversee the development of the U-2 reconnaissance aircraft.

In the 1980s Marshall was an officer with United States Trust Company of New York where he assisted the bank with the management of large estate accounts.

=== Theatrical productions ===
Anthony Marshall's first production was the Tony-nominated Alice in Wonderland which he produced with Sabra Jones and WNET. He and his wife Charlene formed Delphi Productions in 2003 with producer David Richenthal and produced the Tony Award-winning Long Day's Journey into Night (Tony Award, Best Revival of a Play in 2003), and I Am My Own Wife (Tony Award, Best Play in 2004).

== Personal life ==
Marshall was married three times. His first wife was Elizabeth Cynthia Cryan, whom he married on July 26, 1947, in Wynnewood, Pennsylvania. The groom's stepfather Charles Marshall was his best man. They had twin sons:

- Alexander R. Marshall (born May 14, 1953), a photographer
- Philip Cryan Marshall (born May 14, 1953), a tenured professor and director of historic preservation at Roger Williams University until 2017 when he left the position to dedicate his efforts full-time to elder justice as the founder of Beyond Brooke.

His second wife was his former secretary Thelma Hoegnell (born May 11, 1928), whom he married on December 29, 1962. The couple were divorced on January 24, 1992, reportedly following Marshall's affair with Charlene Gilbert, the wife of an Episcopal priest in Northeast Harbor, Maine.

His third wife and widow, whom he married in 1992, is the former Charlene Detwiler Tyler (born July 28, 1945), the former wife of Paul E. Gilbert, a naval officer turned Episcopal priest, and a daughter of Charles Matthew Tyler, an insurance actuary and businessman of Charleston, S.C. By this marriage Marshall had two stepdaughters Arden (born 1969) and Inness (born 1972) and a stepson Robert (born 1976).

In July 2006 Philip Marshall filed suit against his father alleging mistreatment of his grandmother Brooke Astor and mismanagement of her funds. He requested that Anthony Marshall be dismissed as her guardian and replaced by family friend Annette de la Renta. That request was granted temporarily pending a court hearing on August 8, 2006. In December 2006 based on a Court Evaluator's report Anthony Marshall was found not guilty of elder abuse.

=== Trial ===
On November 27, 2007, Marshall surrendered to authorities at the Manhattan district attorney's office to face indictment on sixteen counts relating to the handling of Brooke Astor's will and financial affairs. The charges included conspiracy, grand larceny and possession of stolen property. Attorney Francis X. Morrissey was also charged with six counts including conspiracy, forgery and possession of a forged instrument.

At a press conference following Marshall's arrest, Manhattan district attorney Robert M. Morgenthau stated that "Marshall and Morrissey took advantage of Mrs. Astor's diminished mental capacity in a scheme to defraud her and others out of millions of dollars". He further said that "Marshall abused his power of attorney and convinced Mrs. Astor to sell property by falsely telling her that she was running out of money. He is charged with stealing money from her as well as stealing valuable art work from her Park Avenue apartment."

The trial of Marshall and Morrissey started March 30, 2009, coincidentally his late mother's birthday. On October 8, 2009, Marshall was found guilty of 14 of the 16 charges, including first-degree grand larceny. Although he had his mother's General Durable Power of Attorney since the 1970s, jurors convicted him of giving himself an unauthorized raise bringing his salary up to about $1 million for managing his mother's finances which he had managed since 1977 earning $82 million.

On December 21, 2009, Marshall was sentenced to one to three years in New York State prison. Marshall's attorneys appealed citing jury tampering but the appeal was rejected. 89-year-old Marshall reported to prison on June 21, 2013.

However, after serving just eight weeks of his sentence, the 89-year-old Marshall had grown so sick and frail that he was granted medical parole on August 22, 2013. His health problems included Parkinson's disease and congestive heart failure; his lawyers claimed he could not walk, stand or dress himself. Marshall died on November 30, 2014, at the age of 90 with his wife Charlene by his side.
