= Daniel Thurston =

American army officer (1719–1805)

Daniel Thurston (March 1, 1719, Bradford, Massachusetts – July 14, 1805, Bradford, Massachusetts) was an American officer during the American Revolution, a member of the Committee of Safety and a member of the committee drafting the Massachusetts State Constitution. He was also an architect and house carpenter in Bradford, and had a farm in that region

== Family ==
He was the eldest son of Benjamin Thurston and Mary Gage, whose family had a history of military service in America, dating back to MG Humphrey Atherton. His first marriage was to Hannah Parker, on September 3, 1741. On September 10, 1761, he remarried, this time to Judith Gerrish. His third and final marriage, to Elizabeth Rolfe, took place on September 17, 1767.

His son, Nathaniel Thurston (January 17, 1755 - October 21, 1811), was also a member of the Massachusetts Legislature. His daughter, Mary (born July 24, 1746) married May 21, 1771 Deacon Richard Walker, a farmer and tanner in Bradford, Mass.

== Military and political career ==
Thurston was a captain of the Bradford Militia as early as 1765.

Daniel Thurston was chosen at a Town Meeting (Monday October 10, 1774) to travel to Concord, Mass. on October 11, 1774 to represent Bradford as a Deputy to the Provincial Congress. He was again chosen at another Town Meeting on January 4, 1775, to represent Bradford in the Provincial Congress.

Only one web source actually attributes to him the rank of colonel. However, at least three of his brothers-in-law held that rank—Joseph Gerrish, Samuel Gerrish and Jacob Gerrish, all commanding regiments—during the Revolution.

Multiple sources list him as a member of the Committee to Draft the Massachusetts State Constitution.

== Sources ==
Vital Records of the Town of Bradford Essex Co. Mass. to the Year 1850.

" Thurston Genealogies, compiled by Brown Thurston, Portland Maine, 2nd Edition 1892"

" An Historical Sketch of Bradford, Mass;, In The Revolution, by Louis A. Woodbury 1895"
