= Carleton School (Massachusetts) =

Coordinates: 42.766°N 71.078°W

- Bradford, Massachusetts; United States

Information
- Type: Independent, Boarding
- Established: 1866
- Closed: 1901

Carleton School was a college preparatory boarding school in Massachusetts. It was formed by Isaac N. Carleton in 1866, originally located in Medford. It was relocated to Bradford in 1884. The school continued teaching until about 1901. The facilities still exist in Bradford, operating as an apartment.

== Facilities ==
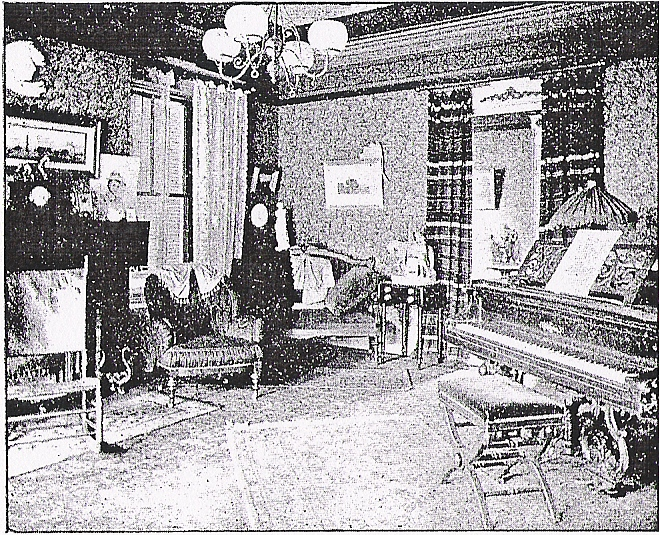
Reception Room

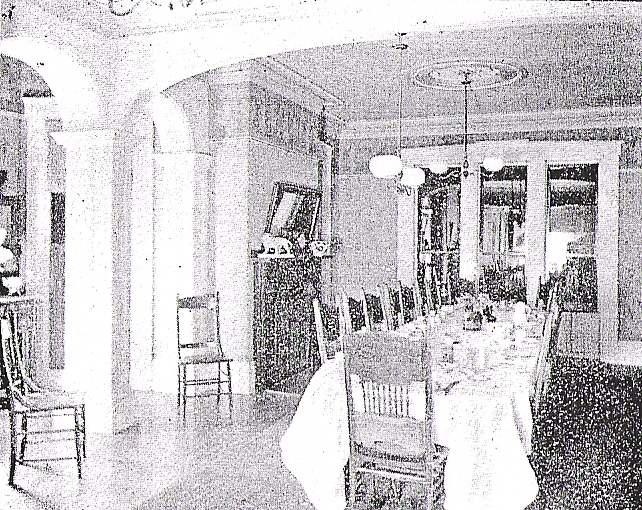
Dining Room

The Medford location was five miles from Boston, reported to be near two railroads and street car service. The house was originally built in South Malden and relocated to Medford.

In Bradford, the school was located in a home above the Bradford common, across the street from Bradford Academy. The Western division of the Boston and Maine Railroad provided transportation to Bradford at the time. Carleton added an additional building to the complex. Up to 15 students were boarded at the school.

The first floor of the main building included a reception room, sitting room, and dining room. The school building included a main school room, two class rooms, laboratory, gym, and bowling alley.

== Instruction ==
College preparatory instruction included Latin, Greek, French, German, Mathematics, Book keeping, Natural Sciences, English Literature and History. Younger children were educated in elementary English, reading, spelling, writing, geography, arithmetic and composition.

== Endorsements ==
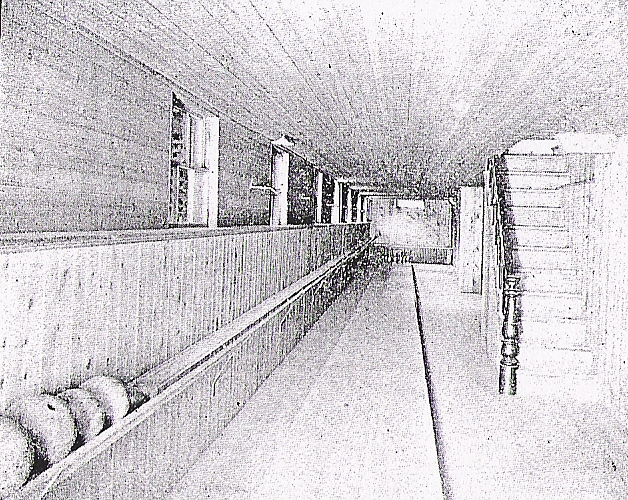
Bowling Alley

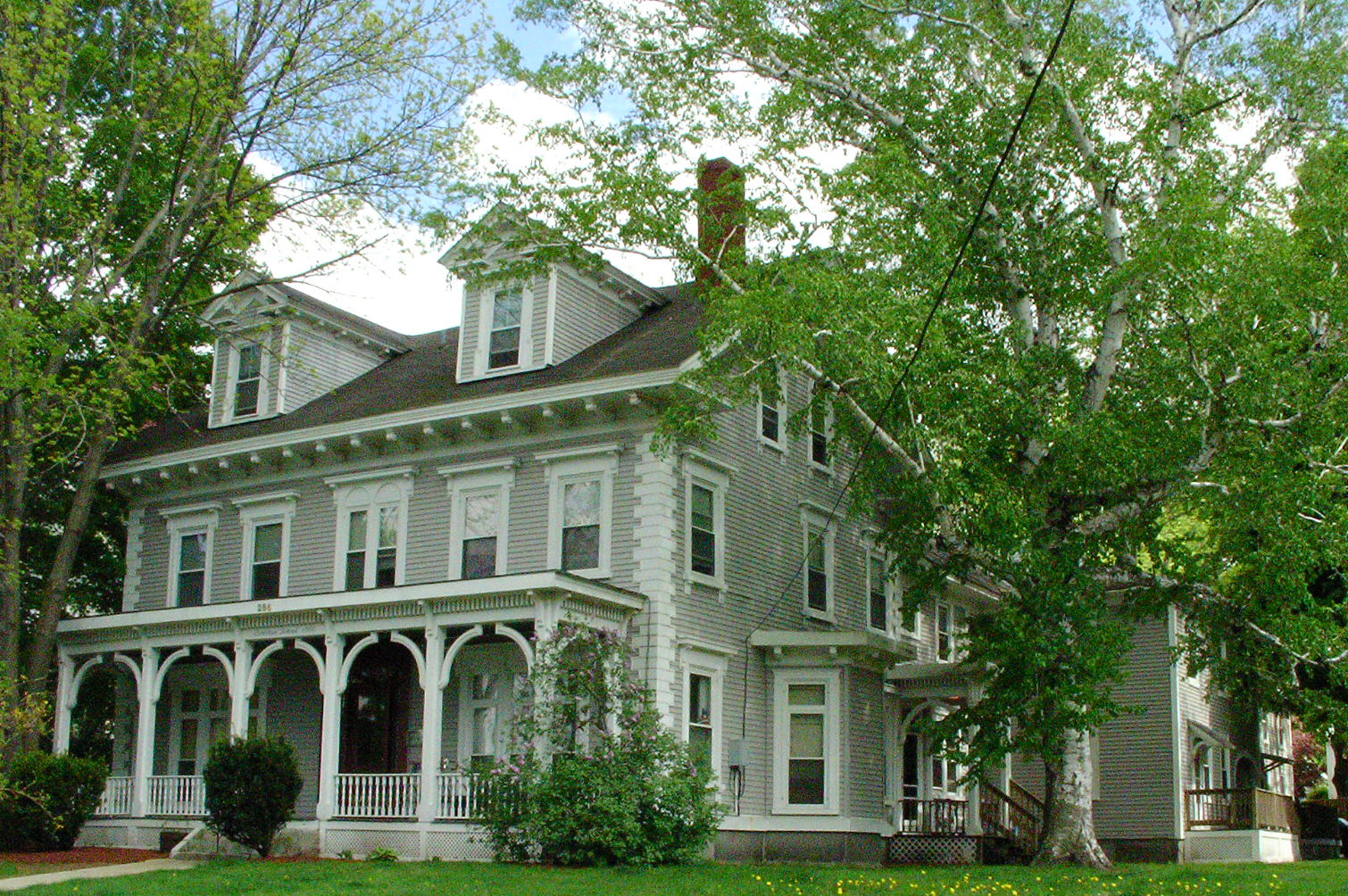
Carleton School in 2008

The school received the following endorsement from the Principal of Phillips Academy. "There is a real demand for a true family school for the best educational reasons. Many boys ought not to be sent at a tender age into the broad currents of a great school which approaches close to the intensity and complexity of a college. Many bright boys, intelligent and ambitious, whose main intention is excellent, have not the maturity requisite to insure a steady industry and a well-directed energy. They have never learned how to study, and they require, for a time at least, the friendly oversight of a wise teacher, his timely intervention, his immediate assistance. They are in danger of wasting much time, of becoming impatient and discouraged, of confusing rather than educating their faculties. It is the function of a home school to meet precisely this requirement."

== History ==
There are three notable periods that defined Carleton School as a preparatory school. The first period ran from 1866 to 1869. In 1868, the school was located in Medford Massachusetts. It was called I.N. Carleton's Home and Day School for Young Ladies. In 1869, Carleton set aside running a private school and went to the New Britain State Normal School (now Central Connecticut State University) in New Britain, Connecticut as the fifth Principal. He served there until 1881.

In 1884, Carleton restarted his private school. It was referred to as I.N. Carleton's Home and Day School for Boys in 1886, located in Bradford Massachusetts. This time period was the longest and most defining period in its operation. By 1896, it was simply called Carleton School. The last period of the school's existence was possibly the most dramatic change. It was to be renamed The Carleton Military School in approximately 1901.

Carleton was still to hold the position of principal, but a Major Baker was to run the military instruction, having previously been a military instructor at Harvard University summer school. Carleton died 8 August 1902, two months after the expected end of the school year. The location of the school continued to be used as a boarding house, being called the Carleton House for Boys and Young Men in approximately 1925. The school buildings still stand near the corner of Chadwick and South Main Street in Haverhill, being used as apartments.
