= Robert W. Gottfried =

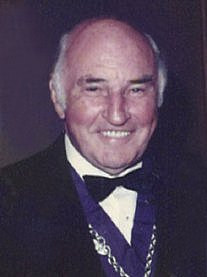
Robert W. Gottfried

Robert W. Gottfried (May 15, 1926 – May 26, 2007) was an American home builder, developer and real estate entrepreneur whose created French Regency-style residences in Palm Beach, Florida. He created more than 500 luxury homes with About 400 of the homes built in the island.

== Early life ==
The son of Florence Ward and William Gottfried, Robert was born in Queens, New York. His father operated a residential construction business creating homes and vacation cottages on Long Island. In 1954, at the age of 28, young Gottfried moved to Palm Beach to work with an uncle.

== Career and family ==
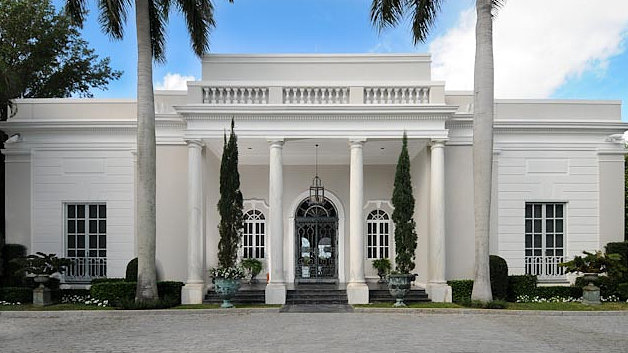
Gottfried Regency 748 Hi Mount Rd Palm Beach, FL 33480

The first house he built was of brick, in the 200 block of Wells Road. His client was prominent Chicago industrialist Rudolph W. Glasner, an Austrian immigrant who held patents for his inventions in machine parts for the automotive industry. Glasner and Gottfried formed a partnership and purchased an entire block in the island's North End. Their $90,000 investment led to the creation of 16 homes on what would become El Dorado Lane. Gottfried had already opened a design center in West Palm Beach. He branched out, adding a marble factory, mirror factory and a company to produce specialty moldings. Aiming to expand further, he formed a development company, and Robert W. Gottfried Inc. was incorporated in 1955. From the time he moved to Palm Beach, he never lived in a house he did not build.

"I got to know how a house should work that way, what works and what doesn't," he said in an interview. As an indication of his pride in his work, the exteriors of his houses built in the 1970s and '80s had a bronze plaque stating, "Built by Robert W. Gottfried Inc." Heeding local architect Clarence Mack's observation about the advantages of having a specialty, Gottfried recalled the elegant lines of buildings he had seen in Paris. Thus, he chose Regency to dress up the vernacular of architecture in Palm Beach—where the style and palette had been dominated since the 1920s by Mediterranean-Revival.

Gottfried intuited the market correctly, as "Gottfried Regency" became a recognized brand within the first decade, with buyers drawn to high ceilings and clean classical lines. Dovetailing the trend, designers at Benjamin Moore paints mixed a custom hue known as "Gottfried Gray." His clients included industry tycoons, celebrities and other bold-faced names—and it was not uncommon for someone to arrive on the island "... to buy a Gottfried." Several streets in Palm Beach are synonymous with his Regency interpretations, as he built several streets of "French Gottfried"—Casa Bendita, Chapel Hill, Chateau Drive, El Dorado Lane, El Mirasol, Polmer Park Road, and Via Los Incas.

In 1978, Gottfried bought Los Incas, a six-acre oceanfront estate in the Venetian style. The seller was widowed socialite Mary Sanford, whose late husband, Stephen "Laddie" Sanford, was a textile heir and polo player. Gottfried razed the 12-bedroom palazzo and replaced it with 10 demi-ones which sold for about $3 million each. Along Polmer Park, Gottfried built Gardenia House, which sits on a lakefront cul-de-sac with a quite lofty elevation. Built in 1969 and renovated in 2001, the house epitomized the developer's trademark style and attention to detailing, symmetry and classic lines.

According to historian Augustus Mayhew, Gottfried's extensive contribution to the Palm Beach landscape was "...modern interiors designed for conveniences rather than antiques." Highly innovative, Gottfried incorporated desirable extras in his houses which heretofore in Palm Beach were confined to custom designs. Features such as the loggia, library, gallery, butler pantry, silver closet, built-in media and security systems drew buyers also attracted to his distinctive inlaid stone driveways.

In 1970, Gottfried married Martha Heines, who had moved to Palm Beach in 1967 from the Midwest. She continued to work with her husband, coordinating contracts between customers buying his houses and a network of design and decor vendors. By 1974, the developer had expanded further into building luxury homes on speculation. Thus, the couple launched a real estate brokerage, Martha A. Gottfried Inc., which set an industry standard from the outset. Transactions reached the $100 million mark by the mid-1980s. At one time, the firm operated three offices on the island, including the flagship location on the famed shopping street, Worth Avenue.

In addition to his preferred specialty of French Regency, Gottfried served clients interested in other styles. In 1973, he built a Georgian mansion designed by architect John Volk, at 1930 S. Ocean Boulevard in Palm Beach, as well as contemporary and Tuscan styles. In an interview published in the November 2014 edition of Architectural Digest magazine about the book "Palm Beach People" with coauthor Hilary Geary Ross, when asked "What's your favorite modern residence in Palm Beach?", she responded "Fashion designer Lisa Perry's house, by the late Palm Beach developer Robert Gottfried, is completely white but punctuated with bold, colorful art. It's so bright and cheerful that you have to smile when you step inside..."

In 1991, when New York financier Gerald Tsai Jr. bought The Reef, an historic Art Deco/Moderne estate at 702 N. County Road, he hired Gottfried to rebuild it. Designed by Maurice Fatio for Josephine Hartford Makaroff, the oceanfront compound was all the rage at the 1937 Paris Exhibition, where it won the Gold Medal as the best modern building in the world at that time. Tsai acquired The Reef a year after it was declared a town landmark. Aware of Gottfried's reputation for sensitivity to all building styles, he engaged the builder in a rare enterprise in Palm Beach—the complete reconstruction of a landmarked structure. Tsai sold the property in 1996 to Metromedia executive Stuart Subotnick, an art collector and owner of thoroughbreds. Subotnick sold The Reef in 2007 to developer Stephen M. Ross, chairman of The Related Companies and owner of the Miami Dolphins NFL franchise.

In 1984, Gottfried acquired a lakefront parcel and built a mansion for himself and Martha at 748 Hi-Mount Road, with custom features found nowhere else on the island. Sited on two-thirds of an acre overlooking the Intracoastal Waterway, the two-story home rests on an ancient coral ridge at the highest elevation in Palm Beach. It is a pristine walled compound of seclusion behind large wrought-iron security gates. In December 1991, Martha Gottfried died of cancer at the age of 54. The couple had no children.

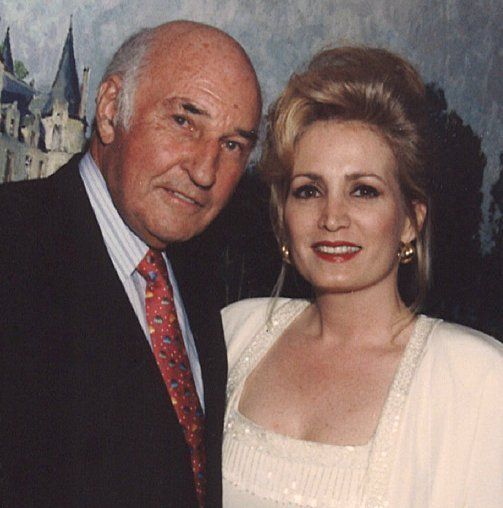
Robert and Pamela Gottfried

In 1992, Broker Associate Pamela Hoffpauer, a long-time agent with the firm, was named president of Martha A. Gottfried Inc. A few years later, she and the developer married. She has been a leader in the town's business community, having been President of the Palm Beach Chamber of Commerce, and serving on the Town of Palm Beach Board of Code Enforcement, and the Town Zoning Commission.

== Legacy ==
After Robert Gottfried's death in 2007, Pamela remained President and owner of Martha A. Gottfried Inc. when the firm was acquired by New York-based brokerage Douglas Elliman. Pamela Hoffpauer Gottfried continues as a Broker Associate with the firm, and one of her listings is the home she shared with her husband at 748 Hi-Mount Road and is valued at about $19 million as of March 2014. Featured in a YouTube video, the house has six bedrooms, 11 full bathrooms, four half-baths, marble floors, casement windows, a temperature-controlled wine cellar, a movie theater, billiard room, gym, cabana and grill room overlooking the swimming pool, a concrete "deep water" dock capable of accommodating a large yacht, and a full-house generator. With high ceilings—even a two-story closet in the master suite and two-story greenhouse windows facing the lake—the house reveals superior architectural detailing. With formal columns and clerestories above arched windows, the house made a vivid statement when built and continues to draw admirers and prospective buyers.

Robert Gottfried's legacy extends beyond the homes he built across Palm Beach. His innovative bent spilled over to related fields, including landscaping and construction materials. "Robert Gottfried built his signature style, in partnership with architect John B. Gosman, into a definitive Palm Beach genre, where his companies controlled almost every aspect of the house's construction, having established Palm Beach Marble & Tile, Classic Moulders, Imports Unlimited, Classic Polyroof Co. and the PaverLock Driveway Co." In the 1980s, he collaborated with Duane Cronenwett of North Palm Beach, who had worked for another Gottfried company. Their inventions received several grants from the U.S. Patent Office in the 1980s. One patent was for a roofing system. A few involved an apparatus and method for injecting trees with nutrients and therapeutic liquids. Their joint venture, Tree Saver Inc., was a timely response which is credited with helping to avert a major crisis on the island. Lethal yellowing disease had already killed many varieties of palm trees all over South Florida.

He was a quiet supporter of local children's charities as well as those in North Carolina, and St. Jude Children's Research Hospital.
