= Bradford, Massachusetts =

Village in Massachusetts, US

- Village
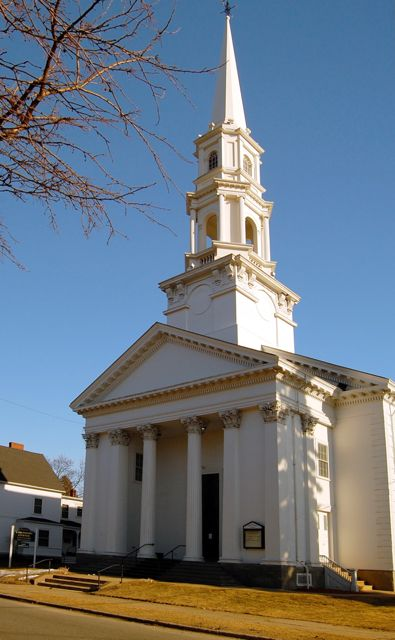
- Bradford's First Church of Christ, facing the common

- Location within Massachusetts Location within the United States
- Coordinates: 42°46′10″N 71°04′33″W
- Country: United States
- State: Massachusetts
- County: Essex
- Incorporated: January 7, 1672
- Disincorporated (Annexed): January 1, 1897
- Time zone: UTC-5 (Eastern)
  - Summer (DST): Eastern

Bradford is a village and former town in Essex County, Massachusetts, United States. Eastern Bradford is the current town of Groveland, while western Bradford was annexed by the city of Haverhill, and today consists of the part of Haverhill on the south bank of the Merrimack River. While its separate existence from Haverhill has been largely obscured, the names of many locations in the area still bear the Bradford name.

== History ==
Bradford was originally part of the town of Rowley, and was called "Rowley on the Merrimack", "Rowley Village by the Merrimack", "Merrimac Lands", or just "Merrimack" before the name was changed to Bradford at a town meeting held January 7, 1672. It was named in memory of Bradford in the West Riding of Yorkshire, England, from which some of the settlers had emigrated, and first paid colonial tax on October 13, 1675. The east parish of Bradford (established in 1726) separated in 1850 and was incorporated as the town of Groveland on March 8, 1850. The remaining west part of Bradford was annexed to the city of Haverhill in 1897.

The original meeting house was located where the Old Bradford Burying Ground is at 326 Salem St. This first church was replaced in 1705. In 1726 the east parish of Bradford was established which later in 1850 became the town of Groveland. In 1751 the church was replaced by a new building that was located on what is now Bradford Common. In 1848 the fifth Bradford church was built at is present location facing the Bradford Common.

Ministers of the Bradford church include the Rev. Zechariah Symmes 1682 to 1707, Rev. Thomas Symmes 1708 to 1725, Rev. Joseph Parsons 1726 d.1765, Rev. Samuel Williams 1765 to 1780, Rev. Jonathan Allen 1781 d.1827, Rev. Ira Ingraham 1824 to 1830, Rev. Loammi Ives Hoadly 1830 to 1833, Rev. Moses Searle 1833 to 1834, Rev. Nathan Munroe 1836 to 1854, Rev. James T. McCollom to 1865, and Rev. John D. Kingsbury.

The first school was established in Bradford in 1701. In 1820 there was a total of seven school houses in six school districts in Bradford. Bradford Academy was established in 1803.

In 1676 Thomas Kimball was killed by a group Indians in Bradford during King Philips War. In 1755 during the French and Indian War Capt. William Kimbal marched a company of men from Bradford to Stillwater, New York. Capt. Nathaniel Gage took a company of 40 men from Bradford to the Battle of Bunker Hill in 1775. A railroad came to Bradford in 1837.

Epidemics struck the town several times in its early years. In 1736, an epidemic of throat distemper killed 47 children and nine adults. The same disease struck again in 1762 when 23 died, and again in 1794 when 15 died. In 1777 a smallpox outbreak caused ten deaths.

The population of Bradford has been 1765 - 1125, 1776 - 1240, 1790 - 1371, 1800 - 1420, 1810 - 1360, 1820 - 1600, 1830 - 1856, 1840 - 2222. In 1850 after Groveland separated from Bradford the population was 1328. In 1895, just before Bradford was annexed by Haverhill, the population was 4736. The 2000 U.S. Census for the Bradford zip code (01835) shows the population as 13,416.

Historical population
Year	Pop.	±%
1765	1,125	—
1776	1,240	+10.2%
1790	1,371	+10.6%
1800	1,420	+3.6%
1810	1,360	−4.2%
1820	1,600	+17.6%
1830	1,856	+16.0%
1840	2,222	+19.7%
1850	1,328	−40.2%
1860	1,687	+27.0%
1870	2,014	+19.4%
1880		—
1890		—
1895	4,736	—
2014	13,416	+183.3%
* = population estimate. Source: United States census records and Population Estimates Program data. Source: U.S. Decennial Census

=== Annexation ===
Bradford is just south of Haverhill on the other side of the Merrimack River. In 1850, the eastern part of Bradford separated to become the Town of Groveland. At the time Haverhill was incorporated as a city in 1870, there were calls for Bradford to be annexed. In 1896, a vote in both Bradford and Haverhill approved the annexation. On January 1, 1897, Bradford joined the City of Haverhill.

Finances played a part in the campaign for annexation. Some Bradford residents had businesses in Haverhill and wanted lower taxes. Traditionalists wanted Haverhill to be a dry town as Bradford was. Businesses in Lawrence, Portsmouth, and Andover wanted Haverhill to be a dry town to increase business in those towns. Bradford lacked the municipal resources and services that Haverhill had, such as hospitals and schools. Some Haverhill residents favored annexation so as to increase Haverhill's English population against the Irish, French-Canadians, Germans, Italians, Hungarians and Slovaks,

Bradford was primarily a farming community and there are a few farms still in operation. Bradford had several shoe manufacturers who later moved to Haverhill except for William Knipe's factory in Ward Hill. Several mills long operated on the Johnson's creek (now in Groveland). These included fulling mills (used to remove the lanolin oil from woolen cloth), saw mills, bark mills, and grist mills for grinding corn.

== Education ==
- Bradford College (closed 2000)
- Bradford Christian Academy
- Northpoint Bible College (closed 2026)
- Carleton School
- Caleb Dustin Hunking Middle School
- Bradford Elementary School
- Sacred Hearts School
- Greenleaf Elementary School
- Knipe Elementary School (now closed) (now the Bradford Christian Academy)
- Cogswell Elementary School (now closed)
- Peabody Elementary School (now closed)
- Wood Elementary School (now closed)
- Haverhill High School (Located across the Merrimack River in Haverhill proper)

== Notable people ==
- Dick Blaisdell, baseball player.
- John F. Boynton, early leader in Latter Day Saint movement, geologist, and inventor.
- Isaac N. Carleton, educator, founder of Bradford's Carleton School.
- Walter Tenney Carleton, businessman, one of the three founding directors of NEC Corporation; attended school in Bradford.
- William Cogswell, U.S. Representative from Massachusetts and colonel in the Union Army during the American Civil War.
- Leonard W. Hardy, Presiding Bishop of The Church of Jesus Christ of Latter-day Saints.
- Milton H. Hardy, educator and founder of Young Men's Mutual Improvement Association.
- Ann Hasseltine Judson, America's first overseas female missionary.
- Walter F. Kelly, football player, coach, and physician.
- Bill Moisan, baseball player.
- John C. O'Connor, football player, coach, and physician.
- Molly Sullivan Sliney, Olympic fencer; moved to Bradford.
- George Davis Snell, co-recipient of 1980 Nobel Prize in Physiology or Medicine.
- Douglas Stuart, Biblical scholar; lives in Bradford.
- Daniel Thurston, officer during American Revolution, Member of Committee of Safety, and member of Committee drafting the Massachusetts State Constitution.
- Nathaniel Savory, one of the first American colonists who is said to have settled on the Bonin Islands.
- Rob Zombie, an American singer, songwriter, filmmaker, and voice actor.

== See also ==
- List of mill towns in Massachusetts
