= John Dryden Kuser =

American politician

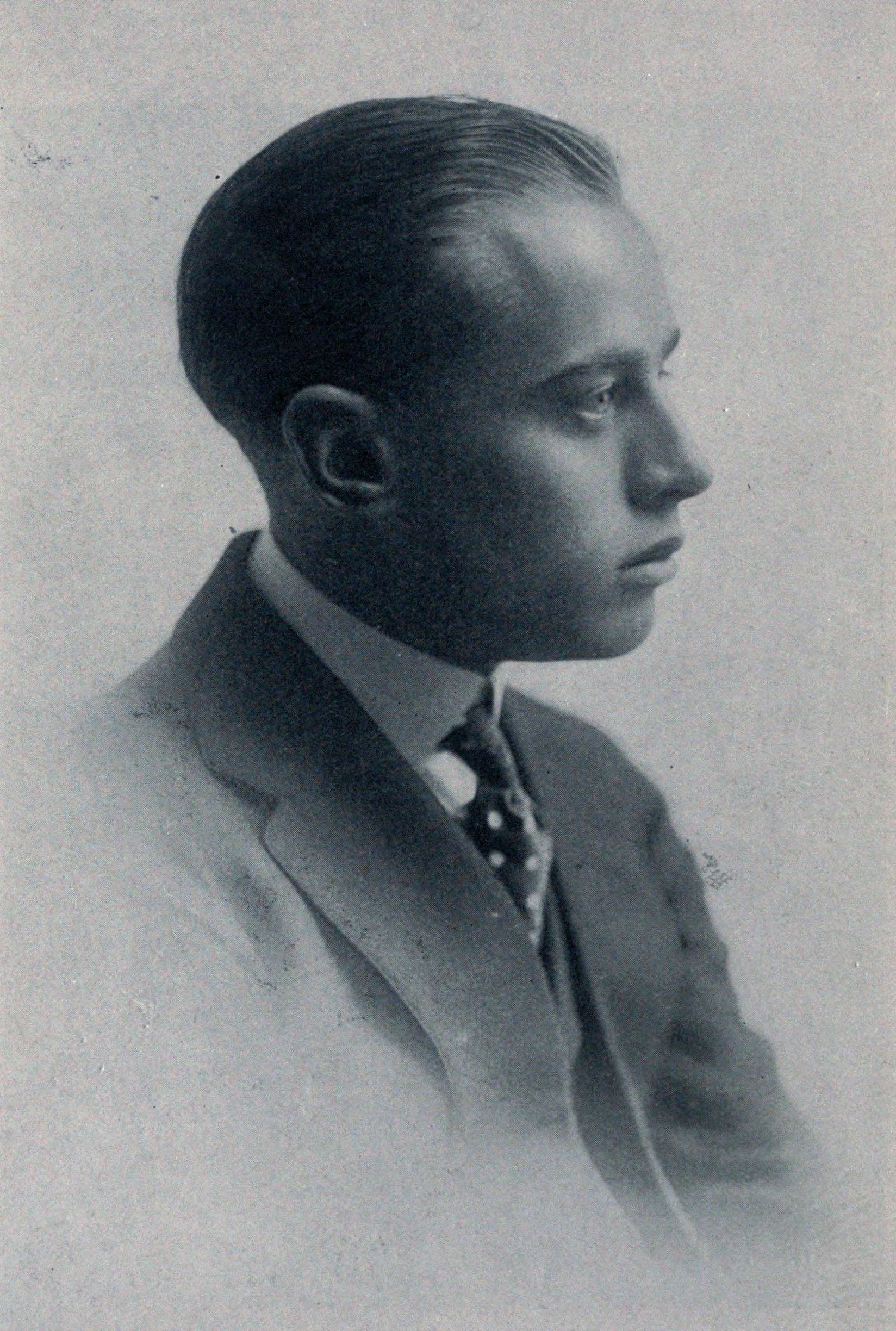
- Portrait from Bird Lore (1916)

Member of the New Jersey Senate from Somerset County
- In office 1930–1936
- Preceded by: Clarence Case
- Succeeded by: James I. Bowers

Member of the New Jersey General Assembly
- In office 1925–1930

Personal details
- Born: John Dryden Kuser; September 24, 1897 Newark, New Jersey, U.S.
- Died: March 3, 1964 (aged 66) New York City, U.S.
- Party: Republican
- Spouses: Roberta Brooke Russell (m. 1919; div. 1930) Vieva Fisher Banks (m. 1930; div. 1935) Louise Mattei Farry (m. 1935, divorced) Grace Egglesfield (m. 1958)
- Children: Anthony Dryden Kuser; Suzanne Dryden Kuser
- Parent(s): Anthony R. Kuser; Susan Fairchild Dryden
- Relatives: John Fairfield Dryden (grandfather)
- Education: Princeton University

Military service
- Allegiance: United States of America
- Branch/service: United States Naval Reserve
- Battles/wars: World War I

John Dryden Kuser also known as Dryden Kuser (September 24, 1897 – March 3, 1964) was a New Jersey politician and a member of an influential New Jersey family. He was the son of Anthony R. Kuser and grandson of Senator and Prudential Insurance founder John Fairfield Dryden.

== Early life ==
Kuser was born September 24, 1897, in Newark, New Jersey, the first of two children of Anthony R. Kuser (1862–1929) and Susan Fairchild Dryden (1870–1932).

Kuser's father, the past President of the South Jersey Gas and Electric Lighting Company and one of the original investors in Fox Movie Studios, had served on the staffs of three New Jersey governors in the late 19th century, and in 1923, donated his 10,500-acre (42 km^{2}) estate to become High Point State Park, the largest public park in New Jersey. His paternal family is of Swiss and Austrian descent.

John Dryden Kuser's grandfather, John Fairfield Dryden (1839–1911), was the founder of Prudential Insurance Company and a United States Senator from 1902 to 1907. He graduated from Princeton in 1918, where he was managing editor of The Daily Princetonian. During World War I, he served in the Naval Reserve.

== Career ==
Kuser launched his political career in 1922, at age 25, winning election as a Bernardsville, New Jersey Councilman. He was elected to the New Jersey General Assembly two years later, and won a seat in the New Jersey Senate in 1929. His wife filed for divorce shortly after the Senate election.

During his six years as State Senator, Kuser's top accomplishment was the passage of legislation that designated the eastern goldfinch as New Jersey's state bird (in 1916, he presided over the Somerset Hills Bird Club). In 1933, John Kuser was the victim of a kidnapping threat. A man named George Sabol was arrested and confessed.

=== Later career ===
Kuser's political career came to an end in 1935, when his wife, Brooke Russell, divorced him amid allegations of abuse and cruelty. Democratic Assemblyman James Bowers captured Kuser's State Senate seat that year. Three months later, Kuser remarried again and moved to Reno, Nevada, where he became a newspaper columnist. From 1937 to 1942, he was an insurance agent and real estate broker in Somerville, New Jersey.

Kuser worked as a consultant to the New Jersey Department of Conservation and Economic Development from 1958 until his death in 1964.

== Personal life ==
In 1919, Kuser married 17-year-old Brooke Russell, later known as Brooke Astor, the daughter of General John H. Russell. Together, they had one child:

- Anthony Dryden Kuser (1924–2014)

In 1930, Brooke filed for divorce. Kuser remarried that same year, on September 3, Vieva Fisher Banks, the former wife of James Lenox Banks, and a descendant of Connecticut Colonial Governor Thomas Welles. Before their divorce in July 1935, they had one child:

- Suzanne Dryden Kuser

In 1935, he married for the third time to Louise Mattei Farry, daughter of Joseph Mattei, and former wife of Joseph Farry. Louise was his former secretary. Her former husband sued Kuser for $500,000 on the grounds of "alienation-of-affections" after Louise left him, and Kuser married her. They settled out of court in 1936.

In 1958, he married for the fourth and final time to Grace Egglesfield Gibbons, a widow of John J. Gibbons, and the mother of John J. Gibbons.

Kuser died in 1964, aged 66.
