= David Richenthal =

David Richenthal is a lawyer and Broadway theater producer. He is the President of Richenthal Productions, Inc. Former companies include Delphi Productions, LLC and Barking Dog Entertainment, Inc.

He was born in New York on May 15, 1948, the son of Arthur Richenthal, a New York real estate lawyer.

== Selected productions ==
- The Kentucky Cycle, which was nominated for a Tony Award but lost 2.2 million dollars for Richenthal.
- Present Laughter (Tony nominee)
- The Young Man From Atlanta (Tony nominee)
- Death of a Salesman (Tony and Drama Desk Award winner)
- The Price (Tony winner; Drama Desk nominee)
- The Crucible (Tony and Drama Desk nominee)
- Long Day's Journey Into Night (Tony and Drama Desk winner)
- I Am My Own Wife (Tony and Drama Desk winner)
