= Brooke Astor =

American philanthropist, socialite, and writer (1902–2007)

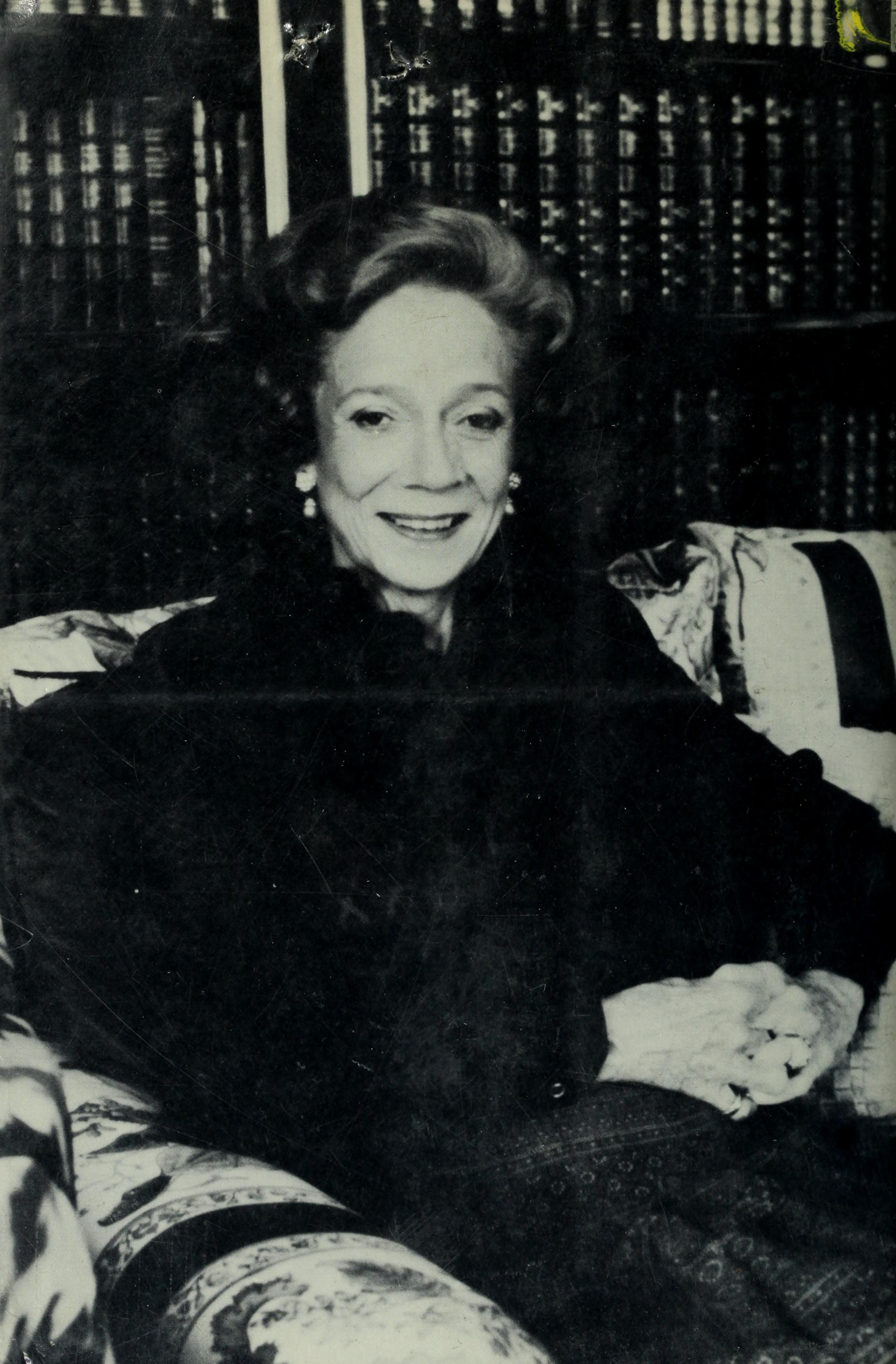
- Brooke Astor c. 1980
- Born: Roberta Brooke Russell; March 30, 1902; Portsmouth, New Hampshire, U.S.
- Died: August 13, 2007 (aged 105); Briarcliff Manor, New York, U.S.
- Burial place: Sleepy Hollow Cemetery
- Education: The Madeira School; Holton-Arms School
- Occupations: Writer, philanthropist
- Spouses: John Dryden Kuser (m. 1919; div. 1930) Charles Henry Marshall III (m. 1932; died 1952) William Vincent Astor (m. 1953; died 1959)
- Children: Anthony Dryden Marshall
- Parents: John Henry Russell Jr.; Mabel Cecile Hornby Howard
- Relatives: John Henry Russell Sr. (grandfather)

Roberta Brooke Astor (née Russell; March 30, 1902 – August 13, 2007) was an American philanthropist, socialite, and writer. She served as the chairwoman of the Vincent Astor Foundation, established by her third husband, Vincent Astor, who was a member of the Astor family. Brooke Astor was the author of two novels and two volumes of personal memoirs.

== Early life and education ==
Roberta Brooke Russell was born in Portsmouth, New Hampshire, the only child of John Henry Russell Jr., the 16th Commandant of the Marine Corps, and Mabel Cecile Hornby Howard. Her paternal grandfather John Henry Russell Sr. was a rear admiral in the U.S. Navy. She was named for her maternal grandmother (Roberta) and was known as Bobby to close friends and family.

Due to her father's career she spent much of her childhood abroad living in China, the Dominican Republic, Haiti, and other places. She briefly attended The Madeira School in 1919, but graduated from the Holton-Arms School. As a child she kept diaries, letters and drawings from her travels, which were published in an illustrated edition of her memoir Patchwork Child: Early Memories in 1993.

== Marriages ==
=== John Dryden Kuser ===
She married her first husband, John Dryden Kuser (1897–1964), shortly after her 17th birthday, on April 26, 1919, in Washington, D.C. "I certainly wouldn't advise getting married that young to anyone," she said later in life. "At the age of sixteen, you're not jelled yet. The first thing you look at, you fall in love with."

John was the son of the financier and conservationist Anthony Rudolph Kuser and Susie Fairfield Drydan. Susie's father was U.S. Senator John Fairfield Dryden. John Kuser later became a New Jersey Republican councilman, assemblyman, and state senator. They also lived in Bernardsville, New Jersey.

Brooke described her tumultuous first marriage as the "worst years of [her] life", which was punctuated by her husband's alleged physical abuse, alcoholism and adultery. According to Frances Kiernan's 2007 biography of Astor, when Brooke was six months pregnant with the couple's only child, her husband broke her jaw during a marital fight. "I learned about terrible manners from the family of my first husband," she told The New York Times. "They didn't know how to treat people". A year after the marriage, according to a published account of the divorce proceedings, John "began to embarrass her in social activities" and "told her that he no longer loved her and that their marriage was a failure".

Brooke and John had one son, Anthony Dryden "Tony" Kuser. She filed for divorce February 15, 1930, in Reno, Nevada. It was finalized later that year.

=== Charles Henry Marshall ===
Her second husband, whom she married in 1932, was Charles Henry "Buddy" Marshall (1891–1952), the only son of Charles Henry Marshall. Buddy was the senior partner of the investment firm Butler, Herrick & Marshall, a brother-in-law of the mercantile heir Marshall Field III, and a descendant of James Lenox, the founder of the Lenox Library.

Astor later wrote that the marriage was "a great love match."

She had two stepchildren by the marriage, Peter Marshall and Helen Huntington Marshall. Helen's first marriage was to composer Ernest Schelling and her second to cellist János Scholz.

In 1942, Brooke's then-18-year-old son Tony changed his name to Anthony Dryden Marshall out of admiration for his stepfather. Buddy's financial fortunes turned in the mid-1940s when Brooke went to work as a features editor at House & Garden magazine for eight years. She also briefly worked for Ruby Ross Wood, a prominent New York interior decorator who, with her associate Billy Baldwin, decorated the Marshalls' apartment at 1 Gracie Square in New York City.

=== William Vincent Astor ===
In October 1953, 11 months after Charles Marshall's death, she married her third and final husband, William Vincent Astor, the chairman of the board of Newsweek magazine and the last rich American member of the famous Astor family. Vincent was the son of RMS Titanic victim John Jacob "Jack" Astor IV and socialite Ava Lowle Willing. He had been married and divorced twice before, had no children and was known to have a difficult personality.

"He had a dreadful childhood and as a result had moments of deep melancholy," Brooke recalled. "But I think I made him happy. That's what I set out to do. I'd literally dance with the dogs, sing and play the piano, and I would make him laugh, something no one had ever done before. Because of his money, Vincent was very suspicious of people. That's what I tried to cure him of."

Not wanting to die alone, Astor agreed to divorce his second wife Mary Benedict "Minnie" Cushing only after she had found him a replacement spouse. Minnie had first suggested Janet Newbold Rhinelander-Stewart who turned down Astor's proposal with startling candor stating "I don't even like you." Minnie then suggested the recently widowed Brooke. Few people believed that the Astor-Marshall union was anything more than a financial transaction. According to Brooke's friend Louis Auchincloss, "she married Vincent for the money," adding "I wouldn't respect her if she hadn't. Only a twisted person would have married him for love."

During her brief marriage to Vincent, whom she called "Captain," Brooke participated in his real-estate and hotel empire and his philanthropic endeavors. Between 1954 and 1958, she redecorated one of his properties, the Hotel St. Regis, which had been built by his father. Vincent died leaving all his money to the Vincent Astor Foundation; Brooke became its chairwoman. Vincent's younger half-brother, socialite John Jacob "Jakey" Astor VI was left with nothing, since Vincent's hatred for Jakey's mother Madeleine (Jack's second wife and widow) led him to believe Jakey was not even a biological Astor. Vincent had nothing but contempt for him. Jakey felt cheated and resentfully stated Vincent "had the legal, not the moral right to keep all the money." He was certain that Vincent was "mentally incompetent" when signing his last will in June 1958 due to alcoholism, though Brooke insisted otherwise. While Vincent was hospitalized, Brooke would often bring him liquor. Jakey accused her of using the liquor to influence the will in her favor. Jakey ended up settling for $250,000. The rest of the money remained with the Vincent Astor Foundation and Brooke. Before Vincent's death, Brooke once privately admitted to her daughter-in-law Elizabeth Cynthia "Liz" Cryan: "I don't think I can stand being married to him anymore. I don't think I can take it. He never wants to go anywhere — he's so antisocial."

Though she received several proposals after Astor's death, she chose not to remarry. In a 1980 interview, she stated: "I'd have to marry a man of a suitable age and somebody who was a somebody and that's not easy. Frankly, I think I'm unmarriageable now." She also said, "I'm too used to having things my way. But I still enjoy a flirt now and then."

== Philanthropy ==
Though she was appointed a member of the board of the Astor Foundation soon after her marriage, upon Vincent Astor's death in 1959, she took charge of all the philanthropies to which he left his fortune. She served as a Trustee of the Metropolitan Museum of Art and chaired the Visiting Committee of the Metropolitan's Department of Far Eastern Art; she is credited with the idea for a Chinese garden courtyard, the Astor Court, in the Metropolitan. In addition, Astor served as a member of the Metropolitan Museum of Art's 100th Anniversary Committee and hosted the Metropolitan's Centennial Ball. She was also a benefactress to the New York Zoological Society for which Astor the baby Asian elephant was named in her honor.

Despite liquidating the Vincent Astor Foundation in 1997, she continued to be active in charities and in New York's social life. The New York Public Library was always one of Astor's favorite charities as was The Animal Medical Center. In 1988 she was awarded the National Medal of Arts. She was elected a Fellow of the American Academy of Arts and Sciences in 1992. As a result of her charity work, Astor was awarded the Presidential Medal of Freedom in 1998. Her life's motto summed up her prodigious generosity: "Money is like manure; it's not worth a thing unless it's spread around."

Among numerous other organizations, she was involved with Lighthouse for the Blind, the Maternity Center Association, the Astor Home for emotionally disturbed children, the International Rescue Committee, the Fresh Air Fund, and the Women's Auxiliary Board of the Society of New York Hospital.

== Elder abuse controversy ==
The New York Daily News ran a cover story on July 26, 2006, describing the family feud between Brooke's son Anthony Marshall and her grandson Philip Cryan Marshall regarding Brooke's welfare. The story detailed how her grandson, a historic preservationist and professor at Roger Williams University, had filed a lawsuit seeking the removal of his father as the socialite's guardian and the appointment of Annette de la Renta, the wife of designer Oscar de la Renta, instead.

According to accounts published in The New York Times and the Daily News, Astor was diagnosed with Alzheimer's disease and suffered from anemia, among other ailments. The lawsuit alleged that Marshall had not provided for his elderly mother and instead had allowed her to live in squalor and reduced necessary medication and doctor's visits while enriching himself with income from her estate. Philip Marshall further charged that his father sold his grandmother's favorite Childe Hassam painting in 2002 without her knowledge and with no record as to the whereabouts of the funds received from the sale. In addition to Annette de la Renta, Henry Kissinger and David Rockefeller provided affidavits supporting Philip Marshall's requests for a change in guardianship.

The day the story appeared, New York Supreme Court Justice John Stackhouse sealed the documents pertaining to the lawsuit and granted an order appointing Annette de la Renta guardian and JPMorgan Chase to be in charge of Brooke's finances. Several news organizations including the Associated Press and The New York Times sued to have the records of the Astor case unsealed in the public interest; their request was granted September 1, 2006. Astor was moved to Lenox Hill Hospital where an unidentified nurse called her appearance "deplorable" according to the Daily News. Brooke's son Tony unsuccessfully attempted to have his mother transferred to another hospital.

Brooke was released from Lenox Hill Hospital July 29, 2006, and moved to Holly Hill, her 75-acre (30 ha) estate in the village of Briarcliff Manor, New York, where she died August 13, 2007.

Meryl Gordon's book Mrs. Astor Regrets: The Hidden Betrayals of a Family Beyond Reproach (2008) makes use of diaries kept by the nurses who cared for Brooke during the last years of her life. The diaries were compiled over the four years Astor received care and detail the elder abuse that she reportedly received from her son.

Philip C. Marshall was a tenured professor and director of historic preservation at Roger Williams University until 2017 when he left to dedicate his efforts full-time to elder justice as the founder of Beyond Brooke.

== Estate tampering ==
The New York Times reported on August 1, 2006, that Anthony Marshall was accused by Alice Perdue, an employee in his mother's business office, of diverting nearly $1 million from his ailing mother's personal checking accounts into theatrical productions. Marshall through a spokesman said that his mother knew of the investments and approved of them. Perdue countered that Marshall had advised her never to send to his mother any documents of a financial nature because "she didn't understand it."

The claims made by Philip Marshall regarding his father's handling of the estate prompted interest in the matter. The New York District Attorney indicted Anthony Marshall and attorney Francis X. Morrissey Jr. in November 2007. The charges stemmed from the district attorney's office and subsequent grand jury investigation into the mishandling of Astor's money and a questionable signature on the third amendment to her 2002 will which was made in March 2004. That amendment called for Astor's real estate to be sold and the proceeds added to her residuary estate. An earlier amendment, also made in 2004, which designated Marshall as the executor of his mother's estate and left him the entirety of the residuary estate, was also under investigation.

The trial of Anthony Marshall and Morrissey started in March 2009 with jury selection. In October 2009, after deliberations that stretched over 12 days and were reportedly marked by bitter disagreements that left one female juror claiming to feel personally threatened by another juror, the jury convicted Anthony Marshall (then age 85) of 14 of the 16 counts against him, including one of two charges of grand larceny, the most serious charge, for giving himself a retroactive $1 million payment for assisting with his mother's finances. The jury acquitted Anthony Marshall on the other first-degree larceny count (for his sale for $10 million of a painting by Childe Hassam owned by Astor, in which Marshall took a $2 million commission), and also acquitted him of falsifying business records. The same jury convicted Morrissey of forgery, conspiracy, and fraud.

In December 2009, Marshall and Morrisey were both sentenced to 1–3 years in prison. Philip C. Marshall, Astor's grandson, said that now that his father had been convicted in the case, he expected the will to be contested by various charities. Anthony Marshall died in 2014.

On November 30, 2011, Sotheby's announced plans for an April 19, 2012, auction of jewelry as well as fine and decorative arts from her Park Avenue apartment and Holly Hill, her Westchester estate.

== Death and interment ==
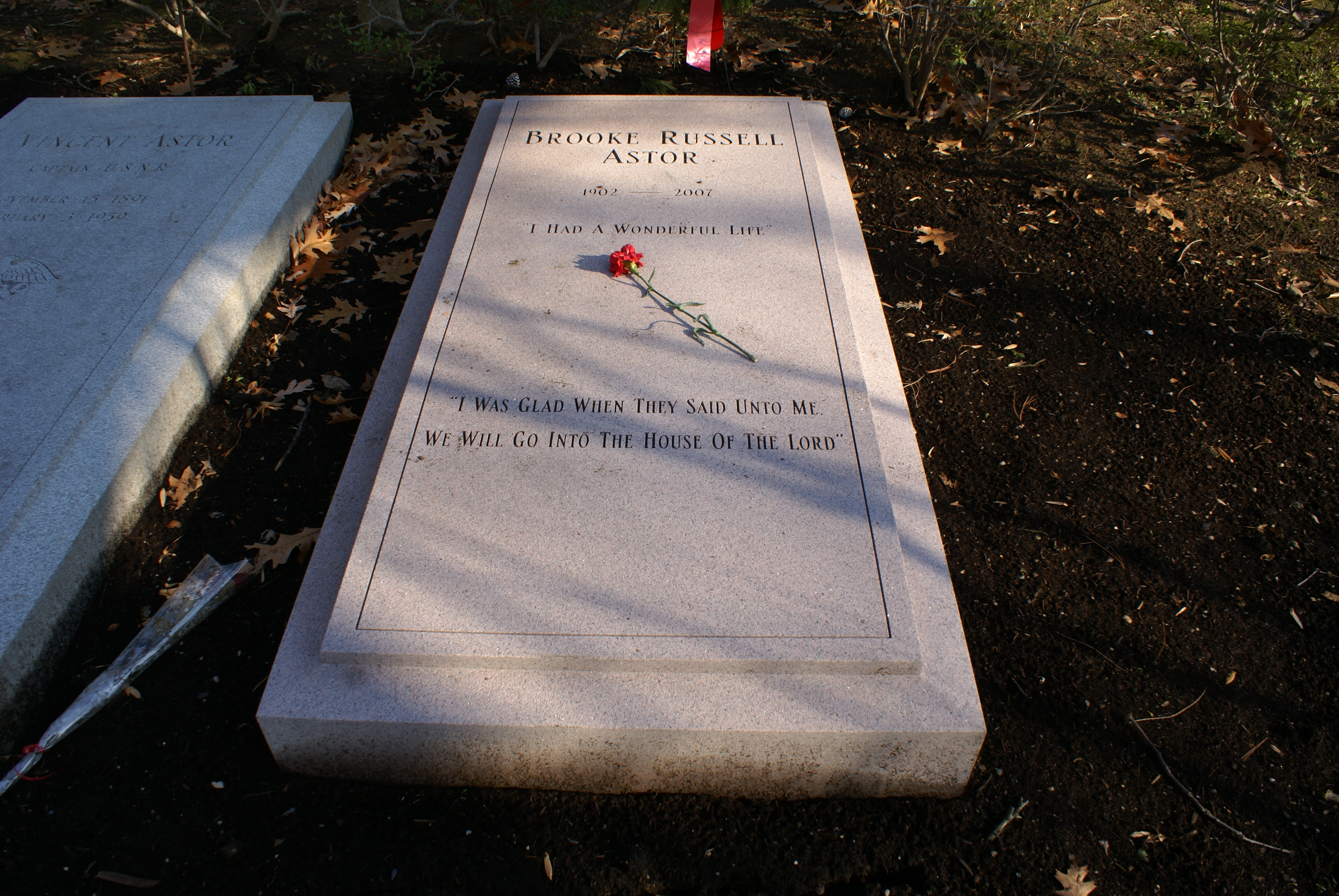
The grave of Brooke Astor in Sleepy Hollow Cemetery

Brooke Astor died August 13, 2007, aged 105, from pneumonia at her home in Briarcliff Manor, New York. A funeral service was held at Saint Thomas Church (Manhattan) on August 17. Among the guests were Henry Kissinger, Oscar de la Renta, Whoopi Goldberg, Jessye Norman and Michael Bloomberg. She is interred in Sleepy Hollow Cemetery in Sleepy Hollow, New York next to Vincent. The epitaph on her gravestone, chosen by her, reads: "I had a wonderful life."

One of Astor's death notices in The New York Times, a paid notice from The Rockefeller University, ended with these lines:

And if you should survive to 105,
Look at all you'll derive out of being alive.
Then here is the best part,
You'll have a head start,
If you are among the very young at heart.

— from "Young at Heart" by Johnny Richards and Carolyn Leigh

Among the organizations who lamented Brooke's death are The Animal Medical Center of New York, Brooklyn Stained Glass Conservation Center, Carnegie Hall, the Citizens' Committee for New York City, Historic Hudson Valley, The Juilliard School, Lenox Hill Neighborhood House, Library of America, Lotos Club, Merchant's House Museum, Metropolitan Museum of Art, Morris-Juemel Mansion Museum, New York Botanical Garden, New York Landmarks Conservancy, New York-Presbyterian Hospital, New York Public Library, New York Regional Association of Grantmakers, New York University, Pierpont Morgan Library, Rockefeller University, Wildlife Conservation Society, New York Zoological Society and WNET-TV.

== Written works ==
- Astor, Brooke (1962). Patchwork Child: Early Memories. New York: Random House. ISBN 0-679-42687-6.
- Astor, Brooke (1965). The Bluebird Is at Home. New York: Random House. ISBN 0-679-42687-6.
- Astor, Brooke (1980). Footprints. Garden City, New York: Doubleday. ISBN 0-385-14377-X.
- Astor, Brooke (1986). The Last Blossom on the Plum Tree: A Period Piece. New York: St. Martin's Press. ISBN 0-312-90545-9.

== In media ==
Brooke Astor is portrayed as the heroine Jane Merle in the romantic comedy Night and Silence: Who is Here? by British novelist Pamela Hansford Johnson.

In an episode of the American comedy 30 Rock, Liz Lemon compliments Angie Jordan's ring, which Lemon states is "ghetto fabulous". Jordan retorts, "This belonged to Brooke Astor".

In an episode of Gossip Girl, Blair Waldorf asks, "when did little Jenny Humphrey become the next Brooke Astor?"

Astor's biography was adapted into the musical Brooke Astor's Last Affair, with book and lyrics by Rachael Migler and music by Eric Grunin. The play premiered at the 2019 Chicago Musical Theatre Festival.

== See also ==
- Astor family
