= John F. Dryden =

American politician (1839–1911)

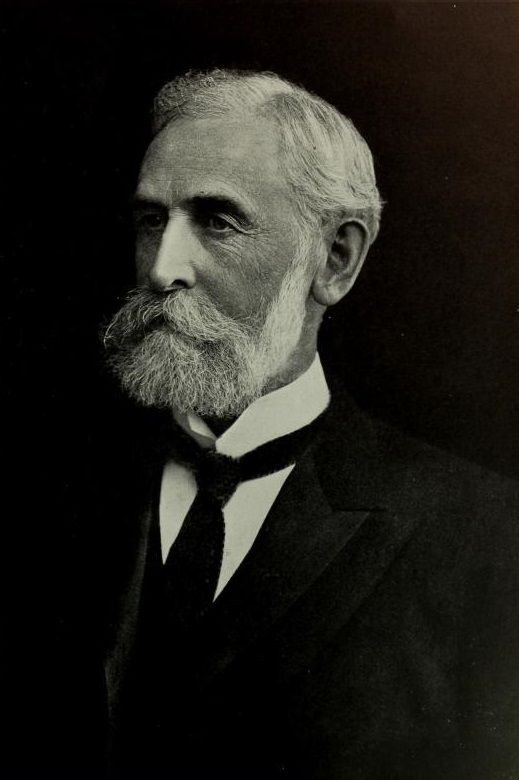
- Dryden c. 1905

United States Senator from New Jersey
- In office January 29, 1902 – March 3, 1907
- Preceded by: William Joyce Sewell
- Succeeded by: Frank O. Briggs

Personal details
- Born: John Fairfield Dryden; August 7, 1839 Temple, Maine, U.S.
- Died: November 24, 1911 (aged 72) Newark, New Jersey, U.S.
- Party: Republican
- Spouse: Cynthia Jennings Fairchild
- Relations: John Dryden Kuser (grandson)
- Education: Worcester Academy
- Alma mater: Yale College
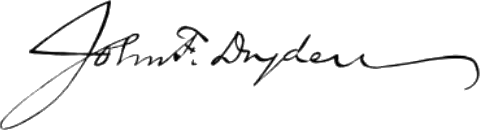
- Signature

John Fairfield Dryden (August 7, 1839 – November 24, 1911) was an American insurance executive and Republican politician who represented New Jersey in the United States Senate from 1902 to 1907. Prior to his election, Dryden founded the Fidelity Trust Company and Prudential Insurance Company. He served as president of Prudential from 1881 until his death, when he was succeeded by his son Forrest F. Dryden. He was known as the "father of industrial insurance".

== Early life ==
Dryden was born in Temple, Maine, on August 7, 1839. He moved in 1846 with his parents to Worcester, Massachusetts. He graduated from Worcester Academy and later attended Yale College.

== Career ==
In 1875, he founded the Widows and Orphans Friendly Society (Prudential Financial) in Newark, New Jersey, becoming its first secretary and in 1881 its president, serving in the latter position until his death in 1911. His son Forrest succeeded him as president, serving until 1922.

Dryden was one of the founders of the Fidelity Trust Company and was involved in the establishment and management of various street railways, banks, and other financial enterprises in New Jersey, New York, and Pennsylvania.

=== Political career ===
He was elected as a Republican to the U.S. Senate to fill the vacancy caused by the death of William J. Sewell, serving from January 29, 1902, to March 3, 1907. Dryden was a candidate for reelection but withdrew because of a deadlock in the state legislature, which at the time elected U.S. Senators. While in the Senate, he was chairman of the Committee on Relations with Canada (57th Congress) and a member of the Committee on Enrolled Bills (58th and 59th Congresses).

== Personal life ==
Dryden was married to Cynthia Jennings Fairchild (1842–1916). Together, they were the parents of:

- Forrest Fairchild Dryden (1864–1932), who married Grace Marion Carleton (1865–1936).
- Susan Fairchild "Susie" Dryden (1870–1932), who married prominent businessman and philanthropist Anthony R. Kuser.

Dryden died in Newark, New Jersey, on November 24, 1911, from pneumonia, following removal of gall stones two weeks earlier. After a funeral at the Third Presbyterian Church in Newark, he was buried at Mount Pleasant Cemetery there.

=== Legacy ===
His estate was valued at $50,000,000 at the time of his death (approximately $1,220,622,568 in 2024). In addition to his home in Bernardsville, New Jersey, Dryden was in the process of constructing a home in High Point, New Jersey, that was to be one of the largest homes in the country.

His daughter Susan used part of the Prudential fortune to donate 10,500 acres (42 km^{2}) for a state park at New Jersey's highest point. John Dryden Kuser, Dryden's grandson, was a state senator and Brooke Astor's first husband.

U.S. Senate
| Preceded by William J. Sewell | U.S. senator (Class 2) from New Jersey; 1902–1907; Served alongside: John Kean | Succeeded by Frank O. Briggs |
