= List of ship launches in 1863 =

The list of ship launches in 1863 is a chronological list of ships launched in 1863.

Date	Ship	Class	Builder	Location	State	Notes
3 January	Paulet	Steamship	Messrs. Charles Mitchell & Co	Low Walker	United Kingdom	For Intercolonial Royal Mail Steam Packet Company.
3 January	Sultana	Paddle steamer	John Litherbury	Cincinnati, Ohio	United States	For Preston Lodwick.
6 January	Princess Alexandra	Steamship	Messrs. Blackwood & Gordon	Port Glasgow	United Kingdom	For private owner.
7 January	Alexandra	Steamship	Messrs. Henderson, Coulbourn & Co.	Renfrew	United Kingdom	For private owner.
7 January	Naturalist	Full-rigged ship	Messrs. Vernon	Liverpool	United Kingdom	For Messrs. Thomas & James Harrison.
7 January	Progress	Steamship	Messrs. T. & W. Smith	North Shields	United Kingdom	For private owner.
8 January	Alexandra	Steamship	Messrs. W. C. Miller & Co.	Liverpool	United Kingdom	Seized by Board of Customs as a suspected Confederate gunboat.
10 January	Oleander	Paddle steamer		Keyport, New Jersey	United States	For James Howe and C. W. Copeland.
13 January	Mendota	Sassacus-class gunboat	F Z Tucker	Brooklyn, New York	United States	For United States Navy.
13 January	Osage	Monitor	Union Iron Works	Carondelet, Missouri	United States	For United States Navy.
14 January	England	Full-rigged ship	John Robinson	Sunderland	United Kingdom	For W. de Mattos.
16 January	Japan	Steamship	Messrs William Denny & Bros.	Dumbarton	United Kingdom	For private owner.
17 January	Lehigh	Passaic-class monitor	Reaney, Son, & Archibold	Chester, Pennsylvania	United States	For United States Navy.
19 January	Botanist	East Indiaman	James Laing	Sunderland	United Kingdom	For Thomas & James Harrison.
20 January	Princess Alexandra	Paddle steamer	Thames Ironworks and Shipbuilding Company	Blackwall, London	United Kingdom	For private owner.
21 January	Annie Duthie	Clipper	Messrs. Barclay, Curle & Co.	Stobcross	United Kingdom	For William Duthie.
21 January	Corsica	Steamship	Messrs. J. & G. Thomson	Govan	United Kingdom	For Cunard Line.
21 January	Ivanhoe	Brig	Messrs. J. & J. Hall	Montrose	United Kingdom	For Robert Johnston.
21 January	Persian	Cargo ship	Harland & Wolff	Belfast	United Kingdom	For J. Bibby & Sons.
21 January	Waverley	Merchantman	Messrs. Robert Steele & Co.	Greenock	United Kingdom	For Messrs. Williamson, Milligan & Co.
22 January	Progress	Schooner	John Jones	Aberystwyth	United Kingdom	For private owner.
22 January	Wolf	Whaler	Messrs. Stephen & Sons	Dundee	United Kingdom	For Walter Grieve.
24 January	Christoforo Columbo	Paddle Steamer	Messrs. William Simons & Co.	Renfrew	United Kingdom	For private owner.
24 January	Star of the South	Steamship	Messrs. J. Wigham Richardson & Son	Low Walker	United Kingdom	For Messrs. Broomfield & Whitaker.
31 January	Surinam	Merchantman	Messrs Archibald M'Millan & Son	Greenock	United Kingdom	For John Kerr.
January	American Diver	Submarine	Horace L. Hunley	Mobile, Alabama	Confederate States of America	For Confederate States Navy.
January	Caspian	Snow	Edward Potts	Seaham	United Kingdom	For L. D. Chatt.
January	County of Lanark	Full-rigged ship		River Clyde	United Kingdom	For private owner.
January	Kintyre	Full-rigged ship	Messrs. Pile, Spence & Co.	Hartlepool	United Kingdom	For Messrs. Mackinnon, Frew, & Co.
January	Medora	Snow	Gibbon & Nichol	Hylton	United Kingdom	For Davidson & Co.
January	Sea Bird	Barque	William Briggs & Son	Sunderland	United Kingdom	For Parker & Co.
January	Surat	Barque		Newburyport, Massachusetts	United States	For private owner.
January	Tallahatchie	Paddle steamer		Cincinnati, Ohio	United States	For Stephen Morse et al.
January	Victoria	Paddle steamer	Messrs. Caird & Co.	Greenock	United Kingdom	For London, Brighton and South Coast Railway.
January	Virginian	Steamship	Messrs. W. Denny & Bros.	Dumbarton	United Kingdom	For private owner.
3 February	Belle	Barque	G. Peverall	Sunderland	United Kingdom	For Bowman & Co.
3 February	Osborne	Steamship	Messrs. Blackwood & Gordon	Port Glasgow	United Kingdom	For Messrs. George Gibson & Co.
5 February	Balmacarra	Barque	J. Gill	Sunderland	United Kingdom	For Mr. Williamson.
6 February	Reindeer	Tea clipper	Messrs. Alexander Hall & Co.	Footdee	United Kingdom	For Jervis Robert Wardley.
6 February	The Spirit of the Sea	Barque	Messrs. Alexander M'Laine & Sons	Belfast	United Kingdom	For private owner.
7 February	Huntsville	Floating battery	Confederate Naval Works	Selma, Alabama	Confederate States of America	For Confederate States Navy.
7 February	Minerva	Steamship	Messrs. Samuelson & Co.	Hull	United Kingdom	For H. H. Perlback.
7 February	Tuscaloosa	Ironclad	Henry D. Bassett		Confederate States of America	For Confederate States Navy.
9 February	Helen Finlayson	Barque	Adamson	Alloa	United Kingdom	For Duncan Finlayson.
16 February	Genova	Steamship	Messrs. Charles Connell & Co.	Overnewton	United Kingdom	For Messrs. Handyside & Henderson.
17 February	Tallapoosa	Sassacus-class gunboat	New York Navy Yard	New York	United States	For United States Navy.
18 February	Ozark	Monitor	George C Bester	Peoria, Illinois	United States	For United States Navy.
18 February	Neosho	Monitor	Union Iron Works	Carondelet, Missouri	United States	For United States Navy.
19 February	Alexandra	Full-rigged ship	William Doxford	Sunderland	United Kingdom	For Blyth & Co.
19 February	Fairy Queen	Brig	Messrs. D. Burns & Co.	Aberdeen	United Kingdom	For John M'Lauchlan.
19 February	Milly	Steamship	J. H. Mackern	Preston	United Kingdom	For private owner.
21 February	Lotus	Steamship	Messrs. C. & W. Earle	Hull	United Kingdom	For Messrs. J. Moss & Co.
February	Eutaw	Sassacus-class gunboat	J. J. Abrahams	Baltimore, Maryland	United States	For United States Navy.
February	Genoa	Steamship	Messrs. C. Connell & Co.	Overnewton	United Kingdom	For Messrs. Handyside & Henderson.
February	Niphon	Steamship		Boston, Massachusetts	United States	For private owner.
February	Tennessee	Ironclad Ram	Henry D. Bassett	Selma, Alabama	Confederate States of America	For Confederate States Navy.
4 March	Asshur	Barque	Messrs. A. Duthie & Co.	Footdee	United Kingdom	For Alexander Hector.
4 March	Chicopee	Sassacus-class gunboat	Paul Curtis	Boston, Massachusetts	United States	For United States Navy
4 March	Constance	Barque	George Storey Moore & Co.	Sunderland	United Kingdom	For Ellisen & Co.
4 March	Kwangtung	Despatch boat	Laird Bros. Ltd.	Birkenhead	United Kingdom	For Imperial Maritime Customs Service.
4 March	Tientsin	Dispatch boat	Laird Bros. Ltd.	Birkenhead	United Kingdom	For Guangdong Fleet.
5 March	Camilla	Steamship	Messrs. George Robinson & Co.	Cork	United Kingdom	For Messrs. Malcolmson.
5 March	Magnetic	Steamship	Messrs. Tod & MacGregor	Partick	United Kingdom	For Belfast Steamship Company.
5 March	Midge	Cutter	Robinson	Gosport	United Kingdom	For HM Coast Guard.
6 March	Yuh-Shung	Schooner	Messrs. Robert Steele & Co	Greenock	United Kingdom	For Messrs. Hamilton, Adams & Co.
7 March	Metacomet	Sassacus-class gunboat	Thomas Stack	Brooklyn, New York	United States	For United States Navy.
7 March	Southerner	Steamship	Messrs. M. Pearse & Co.	Stockton-on-Tees	United Kingdom	For Messrs. Fraser, Trenholme & Co.
8 March	Massasoit	Sassacut-class gunboat	Curtis & Tilden	Boston, Massachusetts	United States	For United States Navy
14 March	Mary Edwards	Schooner	Edward Ellis	Garth	United Kingdom	For Miss Mary Edwards and others.
17 March	Shamrock	Sassacus-class gunboat	New York Navy Yard	New York	United States	For United States Navy.
19 March	Agamenticus	Miantonomoh-class monitor		Portsmouth Navy Yard	United States	for United States Navy.
19 March	Chenango	Sassacus-class gunboat	J. Simonson	Greenpoint, New York	United States	For United States Navy.
19 March	Cremorne	Clipper	Maxson, Fish & Co.	Mystic, Connecticut	United States	For Lawrence, Giles & Co.
19 March	Ocean	Prince Consort-class ironclad		Devonport Dockyard	United Kingdom	For Royal Navy.
19 March	Tetuán	Armored frigate	Reales Astilleros de Esteiro	Ferrol	Spain	For Spanish Navy.
21 March	The Princess of Wales	Schooner	Messrs. Hugh Williams & Co.	Portmadoc	United Kingdom	For Griffith Griffith.
21 March	Victory	Merchantman	Messrs. Laurence Hill & Co.	Port Glasgow	United Kingdom	For Messrs. Potter, Wilson & Co.
20 March	Iosco	Sassacus-class gunboat		Bath, Maine	United States	For United States Navy.
21 March	Georgia	Steamship	Messrs. Palmer Bros.	Jarrow	United Kingdom	For Messrs. Fernie, Bros., & Co.
23 March	Monadnock	Miantonomoh-class monitor	Boston Navy Yard	Charlestown, Massachusetts	United States	For United States Navy.
24 March	Sarah and Jane	Schooner	John Banks Jr.	Kilpin Pike	United Kingdom	For Henry Colverson.
28 March	Onward	Steamship	C. & R. Poillon	Brooklyn, New York	United States	Purchased by United States Navy.
31 March	Otsego	Sassacus-class gunboat	J. A. & D. D. Westerveldt	New York	United States	For United States Navy.
March	Elizabeth Hampton	Schooner	J. & R. Bailey	Shoreham-by-Sea	United Kingdom	For William Hodge.
March	Galatea	Steamship	J. B. & J. D. Van Busen	New York	United States	For private owner.
March	Tirenno	Steamship	Messrs. Henderson, Coulborn & Co.	Renfrew	United Kingdom	For private owner.
2 April	William de la Rue	Steamship	Messrs. Henderson, Coulborn & Co.	Renfrew	United Kingdom	For H. S. Seligman.
3 April	Kenwood	Sternwheeler	H. A. Jones	Cincinnati, Ohio	United States	For private owner.
3 April	Principe Alfonso	Steamship	Messrs. William Denny & Bros.	Dumbarton	United Kingdom	For A. Lopez & Co.
4 April	Ascutney	Sassacus-class gunboat	G. W. Jackson	Newburyport, Massachusetts	United States	For United States Navy
4 April	City of Launceston	Steamship	Messrs. Blackwood & Gordon	Port Glasgow	United Kingdom	For Launceston and Melbourne Steam Navigation Company.
4 April	La Plata	Barque	Messrs. A. M'Millan & Sons	Dumbarton	United Kingdom	For Messrs. Donaldson Bros.
4 April	Rangoon	Steamship	Messrs. Samuda Bros.	Blackwall	United Kingdom	For Peninsular and Oriental Steam Navigation Company.
4 April	Robert Lees	East Indiaman	Messrs. Thos. Vernon & Son	Liverpool	United Kingdom	For Messrs. Liston, Young & Co.
4 April	Stirling Castle	Steaship	Messrs. Robert Napier & Sons	Govan	United Kingdom	For Castle Line.
6 April	Germania	Steamship	Messrs. Caird & Co.	Greenock	United Kingdom	For Hamburg Amerikanische Packetfahrt Aktien Gesellschaft.
7 April	Alexandra	East Indiaman	Harland & Wolff	Belfast	United Kingdom	For T. & J. Brocklebank.
8 April	Blanche	Steamship	A. & J. Inglis	Glasgow	United Kingdom	For Hermann L. Seligman.
8 April	Cheduba	Steamship	A. & J. Inglis	Glasgow	United Kingdom	For British India Steam Navigation Company.
9 April	Marco Polo	Paddle steamer	Messrs. W. Simons & Co.	Renfrew	United Kingdom	For private owner.
11 April	Pine	Fishing smack		Campbeltown	United Kingdom	For private owner.
14 April	Missouri	Casemate ironclad	Jonathan H. Carter	Shreveport, Louisiana	Confederate States of America	For Confederate States Navy.
15 April	Nymphe	Nymphe-class corvette	Königliche Werft	Danzig	Prussia	For Prussian Navy.
16 April	Plongeur	Submarine	Charles Brun	Rochefort	France	For French Navy. First mechanically propelled submarine.
17 April	Bentuther	Barque	William Briggs & Son	Sunderland	United Kingdom	For Mr. Sproat.
17 April	Shawmut	Gunboat	Portsmouth Navy Yard	Kittery, Maine	United States	For United States Navy.
18 April	Cheduba	Steamship	Messrs. Archibald Denny & Sons	Dumbarton	United Kingdom	For British Indian Steam Navigation Company.
18 April	Hector	Steamship	James Laing	Sunderland	United Kingdom	For E. T. Gourlay & Co.
18 April	Princess Alexandra	Schooner	John Barter	Brixham	United Kingdom	For William Sprague and others.
18 April	Re d'Italia	Re d'Italia-class ironclad	William H. Webb	New York	United States	For Regia Marina.
18 April	Royal Dane	Brig	L. Wheatley	North Hylton	United Kingdom	For Messrs. James Leslie & Co.
20 April	Alexandra	Cutter	Ratsey	East Cowes	United Kingdom	For Royal Yacht Squadron.
20 April	Coquette	Schooner	Ratsey	East Cowes	United Kingdom	For Royal Yacht Squadron.
20 April	Glengairn	Clipper	Messrs. Water Hood & Co.	Aberdeen	United Kingdom	For Aberdeen Clipper Line.
20 April	Tyne	Schooner	Messrs. Hansen	Cowes	United Kingdom	For George Robert Stephenson.
21 April	Agawam	Gunboat	G. W. Lawrence	Portland, Maine	United States	For United States Navy
21 April	City of London	Steamship	Messr. Tod & MacGregor	Partick	United Kingdom	For Inman Line.
22 April	City of Dunedin	Clipper	Messrs. Denny & Rankin	Dumbarton	United Kingdom	For Messrs. Patrick Henderson & Co.
22 April	Mackinaw	Sassacus-class gunboat		New York Navy Yard	United States	For United States Navy.
28 April	Edward F. Williams	Pilot boat	Edward F. Williams	Greenpoint, New York	United States	For New York Pilots Association.
28 April	Regina Maria Pia	Regina Maria Pia-class ironclad	Société Nouvelle des Forges et Chantiers de la Méditerranée	La Seyne	France	For Regia Marina.
30 April	Vartry	Steamship	Messrs. Scott & Co	Greenock	United Kingdom	For private owner.
April	Joan Cunllo	Barque	W. Barkley	Sunderland	United Kingdom	For Jones & Co.
April	Principe Alfonso	Steamship	Messrs. W. Denny & Bros.	Dumbarton	United Kingdom	For Messrs. A. Lopez & Co.
1 May	Solent	Paddle steamer	George Inman	Lymington	United Kingdom	For Solent Steam Packet Company.
2 May	Island Queen	Barque	William Doxford	Pallion	United Kingdom	For Wheatley & Co.
2 May	Mount Vernon	Barque	Messrs. Thomas Vernon & Son	Liverpool	United Kingdom	For Messrs. Nelson, Alexander & Co.
2 May	The Bella	Barque	Messrs. R. & J. Evans & Co.	Liverpool	United Kingdom	For Messrs. Vining, Killey & Co.
4 May	I'll Try	Brig	John Smith	Aberdeen	United Kingdom	For James Cumming.
4 May	John Clarke	Brig	Messrs. Metcalfe & Lee	South Shields	United Kingdom	For James Jobling & John Clarke.
4 May	Robert Chambers	Ferry		Newcastle upon Tyne	United Kingdom	For Tyne Ferry Company.
5 May	Martha Birnie	Clipper	William Duthie Jr.	Aberdeen	United Kingdom	For private owner.
6 May	Rolf Krake	Ironclad	Cowper Phipps Coles	Glasgow	United Kingdom	For Royal Danish Navy. Denmark's first ironclad warship.
6 May	Silvery Wave	Brig	Messrs. J. Wray & Sojns	Burton Stather	United Kingdom	For Messrs. Bullard, King & Co.
7 May	Helen Scott	East Indiaman	Messrs. Jones, Quiggan & Co.	Liverpool	United Kingdom	For Messrs. Copeland Bros.
7 May	Tacony	Sassacus-class gunboat	Philadelphia Navy Yard	Philadelphia, Pennsylvania	United States	For United States Navy.
7 May	Woolton	Merchantman	James Hardie	Southwick	United Kingdom	For James Longton & Co.
8 May	Fiery Cross	Schooner	Messrs. Fyfe & Son	Fairlie	United Kingdom	For James Fairlie.
9 May	Enterprise	Sternwheeler	James Trahey	Alexandria	(United Kingdom of Great Britain and Ireland) Colony of British Columbia	For Gustavus Blin Wright & Thomas Wright.
12 May	Wyalusing	Sassacus-class gunboat	William Cramp & Sons	Philadelphia Navy Yard	United States	For United States Navy.
14 May	Forest Oak	Ketch	William Pickersgill	Sunderland	United Kingdom	For Mr. Hudson.
15 May	Mary Anne	Paddle steamer	Messrs. Charles Connel & Son	Overnewton	United Kingdom	For private owner.
16 May	Alumbagh	Full-rigged ship	James Laing	Sunderland	United Kingdom	For Abbott Dunbar.
16 May	Buccleuch	Steamship	William Adamson	Newcastle upon Tyne	United Kingdom	For Messrs Clarke & Reeve.
16 May	Edinburgh Castle	East I~ndiaman	J. G. Lawrie	Whiteinch	United Kingdom	For Glasgow and Asiatic Shipping Co.
16 May	Herald	Full-rigged ship	W. Pile	Sunderland	United Kingdom	For John R. Kelso.
16 May	Trevelyan	Full-rigged ship	Messrs. W. Pile, Hay, & Co.	Sunderland	United Kingdom	For Messrs. G. D. Tyson & Co.
18 May	Astracantis	Steamship	Messrs. Mitchell	Low Walker	United Kingdom	For private owner.
18 May	Pak Wan	Full-rigged ship	George Peverall	Sunderland	United Kingdom	For J. Patton.
18 May	Pervenets	Pervenets-class ironclad	Thames Iron Works	Blackwall	United Kingdom	For Imperial Russian Navy.
19 May	Iona	Paddle steamer	Messrs. J. & G. Thomson	Govan	United Kingdom	For Messrs. D. Hutcheson & Co.
19 May	Salamis	Despatch vessel		Chatham Dockyard	United Kingdom	For Royal Navy.
20 May	Warwick Castle	Merchantman	Messrs. Robert Napier & Sons	Govan	United Kingdom	For Castle Line.
22 May	Barwon	Steamship	Messrs. Steel & Co.	Cartsdyke	United Kingdom	For Messrs. James Little & Co.
22 May	Snaefell	Paddle steamer	Messrs. Caird & Co.	Greenock	United Kingdom	For Isle of Man Steam Packet Company.
28 May	Lenapee	Sassacus-class gunboat	Edward Lupton	Brooklyn, New York	United States	For United States Navy.
29 May	Osceola	Sassacus-class gunboat	Curtis & Tilden	Boston, Massachusetts	United States	For United States Navy.
30 May	Madras	Merchantman	Messrs. A. M'Millan & Son	Dumbarton	United Kingdom	For private owner.
May	Europe	Barque	G. Bartram	Hylton	United Kingdom	For Richard Wynn.
May	Golden Fleece	Barque	Messrs. W. Pyle, Hay, & Co.	Sunderland	United Kingdom	For H. Ellis.
May	St. Thomas	Steamship	T. R. Oswald	Pallion	United Kingdom	For Messrs. Imrie & Tomlinson and Messrs. Dranty & Co.
May	Tyrol	Barque		Quebec	(United Kingdom of Great Britain and Ireland) Province of Canada	For private owner.
May	Unnamed	Brig	James Hardie	Southwick	United Kingdom	For Messrs. J. Longton Jr. & Co.
2 June	Dunkeld	Clipper	Messrs. John Duthie & Co.	Aberdeen	United Kingdom	For Messrs. Foley & Aikman.
2 June	Volunteer	Schooner	Daniel Griffith	Portmadoc	United Kingdom	For private owner.
3 June	Silver Cloud	Barque	Liddle & Sutcliffe	North Hylton	United Kingdom	For Mr. Thompson.
4 June	Pequot	Gunboat	Boston Navy Yard	Boston, Massachusetts	United States	For United States Navy.
4 June	Sturdy	Tug	Messrs. Hart & Sinott	Liverpool	United Kingdom	For private owner.
6 June	Stalwart	Full-rigged ship	Messrs. Hart & Sinott	Liverpool	United Kingdom	For Messrs. Findlay, Campbell & Co.
8 June	Albyn	Sloop	M'Lea	Rothesay	United Kingdom	For Archibal M'Kersie.
11 June	Feronia	Barque		Bathurst, New Brunswick	(United Kingdom of Great Britain and Ireland) Colony of New Brunswick	For private owner.
13 June	County of Ayr	Clipper	Messrs. Charles Connell & Co.	Overnewton	United Kingdom	For Messrs. R. & J. Craig.
13 June	Zoolite	Brig	Messrs. D. & A. Fullarton	Ayr	United Kingdom	For private owner.
15 June	Nipsic	Gunboat	Portsmouth Navy Yard	Kittery, Maine	United States	United States Navy.
16 June	City of Dunedin	Paddle steamer	Messrs. Denny & Co., or Messrs Archibald Denny & Sons	Dumbarton	United Kingdom	For John Jones and John Cargill.
17 June	Celæno	Full-rigged ship	Messrs. Hall	Aberdeen	United Kingdom	For Black Ball Line.
17 June	Normandy	Paddle steamer	Messrs. James Ash & Sons	Blackwall	United Kingdom	For London and South Western Railway.
17 June	Washington	Paddle steamer	Messrs. Scott & Son	Cartsdyke	United Kingdom	For Compagnie Générale Transatlantique.
18 June	Britannia	Steamship	Messrs. Tod & MacGregor	Partick	United Kingdom	For Anchor Line.
19 June	Star of Denmark	Sailing ship	Harland & Wolff	Belfast	United Kingdom	For J. P. Corry & Co.
29 June	Cheshire	Paddle ferry	Messrs. Hill, Lawrence & Co.	Toxteth	United Kingdom	For Birkenhead Commissioners.
29 June	Virginia II	Ironclad ram	William Graves	Richmond, Virginia	Confederate States of America	For Confederate States Navy.
30 June	Savannah	Ironclad	H. F. Willink	Savannah, Georgia	Confederate States of America	For Confederate States Navy.
June	Alerta	Steamship	Messrs. Henderson, Coulborn & Co.	Renfrew	United Kingdom	For Montreal Ocean Steamship Company.
June	Mary Anne	Steamship	Messrs. Caird & Co.	Glasgow	United Kingdom	For Confederate States Government.
June	Penola	Steamship	Laurence Hill & Co.	Port Glasgow	United Kingdom	For Grice, Sumner & Co.
June	Red Deer	Clipper		River Clyde	United Kingdom	For private owner.
June	Sarah	Schooner	Atkinson & Thompson	Knottingley	United Kingdom	For William Branford.
Unknown date	Water Lily	Ketch	B. Blamey	Falmouth	United Kingdom	For B. Blamey.
1 July	Cresswell	Barque	William Briggs & Son	Southwick	United Kingdom	For Mr. Eltringham.
1 July	Erme	Schooner	William Bonker	Salcombe	United Kingdom	For Robert H. Balkwill and others.
1 July	Roslin Castle	East Indiaman	Messrs. Connell & Co.	Overnewton	United Kingdom	For Glasgow and Asiatic Shipping Co.
2 July	Belted Will	Merchantman	Harrington and Workington Shipbuilding Co.	Workington	United Kingdom	For Messrs. Bushby & Edwards.
2 July	Chiyodagata	Gunboat	Ishikawajima	Tokyo	Japan	For Tokugawa Navy.
2 July	Elm Grove	Barque	Arbroath Shipbuilding Co.	Arbroath	United Kingdom	For J. L. Cargill.
2 July	Euphrates	Steamship	Messrs. A. & J. Inglis	Partick	United Kingdom	For British India Steam Navigation Company.
2 July	George Elliot	Steamship	James Laing	Deptford	United Kingdom	For Jonassohn & Elliot.
2 July	Guiding Star	Snow	J. Hardie	Southwick	United Kingdom	For John Dixon.
3 July	Maumee	Gunboat	New York Navy Yard	New York	United States	For United States Navy.
4 July	Akindo	Barque	Messrs. J. & J. Hall	Dundee	United Kingdom	For Messrs. G. Armstead & Co.
4 July	Campanera	Steam yacht	Samuel John White	Cowes	United Kingdom	For Colonel Clifton.
4 July	Elizabeth Barrow	Schooner	William Ashburner	Barrow-in-Furness	United Kingdom	For James Pernie.
4 July	Furness Maid	Schooner	William Ashburner	Barrow-in-Furness	United Kingdom	For Henry Bond.
4 July	Princess Alexandra	Steamship	Messrs. Blackwood & Gordon	Port Glasgow	United Kingdom	For London and Limerick Steam Shipping Company.
4 July	El Tousson	Ironclad	John Laird, Sons & Co.	Birkenhead	United Kingdom	Allegedly for Egyptian Navy, but really for Confederate States Navy. Seized by British government and entered Royal Navy service as HMS Scorpion.
4 July	Sylvia	Merchantman	Messrs. Royden & Co.	Liverpool	United Kingdom	For Messrs. Charles Moore & Co.
4 July	Winnebago	Milwaukee-class monitor	Union Iron Works	St. Louis, Missouri	United States	For United States Navy
7 July	Pawtuxet	Pawtuxet-class cutter	Thomas Stack	New York	United States	For United States Revenue Marine.
8 July	Ashuelot	Pawtuxet-class cutter	John Englis	New York	United States	For United States Revenue Marine.
9 July	Virginia	Barque	John Robinson	Liverpool	United Kingdom	For Messrs. Robinson, Philpott & Broadbent.
18 July	Calcutta	Merchantman	Messrs. Laird, Sons, & Co.	Birkenhead	United Kingdom	For Messrs. F. Clint & Co.
18 July	Fanny	Cutter yacht	Messrs. Camper & Nicholson	Gosport	United Kingdom	For H. O'Bierne.
21 July	Infanta Ysabel	Steamship	Messrs. Denny Bros.	Dumbarton	United Kingdom	For Messrs. A. Lopez & Co.
25 July	Western Metropolis	Paddle steamer	Atlantic Marine Railway Company	Red Hook, New York	United States	For Benner & Brown Co.
29 July	Mahoning	Pawtuxet-class cutter	J. W. Lynn	Philadelphia, Pennsylvania	United States	For United States Revenue Marine.
29 July	Onondaga	Ironclad monitor	Continental Iron Works	Greenpoint, New York	United States	For United States Navy.
29 July	Vienna	Steamship	Messrs. Barclay, Curle & Co.	Whiteinch	United Kingdom	For Leith, Hull & Hamburg Steam Packet Co.
30 July	Hygeia	Barque	J. M. Reed	Sunderland	United Kingdom	For Joseph Crisp & Matthew Cay Jr..
30 July	Wanganui	Steamship	Gourlay Brothers	Dundee	United Kingdom	For Wanganui Steam Navigation Company.
30 July	Winooski	Sassacus-class gunboat	Boston Navy Yard	Boston, Massachusetts	United States	For United States Navy
31 July	Roslin Castle	East Indiaman	Messrs. Robert Napier & Sons	Govan	United Kingdom	For Castle Line.
July	Atossa	Barque	Robert Thompson & Sons	Sunderland	United Kingdom	For Nicholson & Co.
July	Exile	Barque		Machais, Maine	United States	For private owner.
July	H. L. Hunley	Submarine	Hunley, McClintock, and Watson	Mobile, Alabama	Confederate States of America	For Confederate States Navy.
July	Icon	Barque		Miramichi	(United Kingdom of Great Britain and Ireland) Colony of New Brunswick	For private owner.
July	Mary Cook	Steamship		East Albany, New York	United States	For James D. Stevenson.
July	Ouse	Steamship	Messrs. Fowler & McCollin	Hull	United Kingdom	For E. Leetham.
July	The Spell	Yacht	Michael Scallan	Ringsend	United Kingdom	For private owner.
July	Tobasco	Schooner	Dundee Shipbuilding Co.	Dundee	United Kingdom	For Messrs. Graham & Co.
1 August	Atlantic	Tanker	Messrs. John Rogerson & Co.	Newcastle upon Tyne	United Kingdom	For Petroleum Trading Company.
1 August	Canonicus	Canonicus-class monitor	Harrison G. Loring	Boston, Massachusetts	United States	Lead ship of her class. For United States Navy.
1 August	Jessie Jamieson	Barque	T. R. Oswald	Sunderland	United Kingdom	For Johnston & Co., or Messrs. Hargrove, Ferguson & Co.
1 August	Castelfidardo	Regina Maria Pia-class ironclad	Chantiers et Ateliers de l'Océan	Bordeaux	France	For Regia Marina.
1 August	Royal Standard	Steamship	Messrs. Palmer Bros.	Jarrow	United Kingdom	For White Star Line.
1 August	Ulcoats	Merchantman	Messrs. Jones, Quiggan & Co.	Liverpool	United Kingdom	For Messrs. Wilson and Chambers & Blythe Bros.
1 August	Victoria Cross	Merchantman	Messrs. Jones, Quiggan & Co.	Liverpool	United Kingdom	For Messrs. Wilson and Chambers & Blythe Bros.
3 August	Cecilia	Merchantman	Hackern	Preston	United Kingdom	For Messrs. Wilson & Chambers.
6 August	Mingoe	Sassacus-class gunboat	D. S. Mainthon	Bordentown, New Jersey	United States	For United States Navy
12 August	Wateree	Sassacus-class gunboat	Reany, Son, and Archibold	Chester, Pennsylvania	United States	For United States Navy.
14 August	Princess of Wales	Schooner	Messrs. Stephen & Forbes	Peterhead	United Kingdom	For private owner.
15 August	Comorin	Steamship	London Works	Renfrew	United Kingdom	For British India Steam Navigation Company.
15 August	Europa	Steamship	Messrs. Palmer Bros.	Howdon or Jarrow	United Kingdom	For private owner.
15 August	John McIntyre	Collier	Messrs. Palmer Bros.	Howdon or Jarrow	United Kingdom	For Messrs. Cory & Co.
15 August	Latona	Steamship	Messrs. Palmer Bros.	Howdon or Jarrow	United Kingdom	For private owner.
15 August	Miantonomoh	Miantonomoh-class monitor	New York Navy Yard	Brooklyn, New York	United States	For United States Navy.
15 August	Ophelia	Steamship	Messrs. John Reid & Co.	Greenock	United Kingdom	For Messrs. C. T. Bowring & Co.
15 August	Research	Camelion-class sloop	Pembroke Dockyard	Pembroke	United Kingdom	For Royal Navy.
15 August	Syria	Paddle steamer	Messrs. Day & Co.	Northam	United Kingdom	For Peninsular and Oriental Steam Navigation Company.
15 August	Victoria Nyanza	Sailing ship	Harland & Wolff	Belfast	United Kingdom	For Joshua Prouse & Co.
15 August	No. 1	Steamship	Messrs. Palmer Bros.	Howdon or Jarrow	United Kingdom	For private owner.
17 August	Ann	Brig	Messrs. Hodgson & Soulsby	Blyth	United Kingdom	For T. Knight.
17 August	Princess Royal	Steamship	Messrs. Tod & MacGregor	Partick	United Kingdom	For private owner.
17 August	Sea King	Steamship	Alexander Stephen and Sons	Glasgow	United Kingdom	For private owner.
19 August	Bedfordshire	Full-rigged ship	Messrs. Potter & Co.	Liverpool	United Kingdom	For Mr. Boult, English & Brandon.
21 August	Peruvian	Steamship	Messrs. Steele & Co.	Greenock	United Kingdom	For Messrs. Allan.
24 August	Carnation	Steamship	Neafie and Levy	Philadelphia, Pennsylvania	United States	For United States Navy.
27 August	Tuskar	Steamship	Messrs. Blackwood & Gordon	Port Glasgow	United Kingdom	For Clyde Shipping Co.
28 August	Saco	Gunboat	Boston Navy Yard	Boston, Massachusetts	United States	For United States Navy.
29 August	Barosa	Steamship	Millwall Company	Blackwall	United Kingdom	For Peninsular and Oriental Steam Navigation Company.
29 August	Golconda	Steamship	Thames Shipbuilding Company	Blackwall	United Kingdom	For Peninsular and Oriental Steam Navigation Company.
29 August	Re di Portogallo	Re d'Italia-class ironclad	William H. Webb	New York	United States	For Regia Marina.
29 August	El Monassir	Ironclad	JohnLaird, Sons & Co	Birkenhead	United Kingdom	Allegedly for Egyptian Navy, but really for Confederate States Navy. Seized by British government and entered Royal Navy service as HMS Wivern.
29 August	Wolverine	Jason-class corvette		Woolwich Dockyard	United Kingdom	For Royal Navy.
29 August	Creuse	Sarthe-class horse transport	Arsenal de Rochefort	Rochefort	France	For French Navy.
29 August	Young Lochinvar	Clipper	Messrs. Steele & Co.	Cartsdyke	United Kingdom	For Messrs. M'Diarmid & Greenshields.
31 August	Manchester	Merchantman	Messrs. Harland, Brown, & Co	Tranmere	United Kingdom	For West African Company.
31 August	Wayanda	Pawtuxet-class cutter	J. T. Fardy & Bros.	Baltimore, Maryland	United States	For United States Revenue Marine.
August	Bessie	Schooner	Joseph & Nicholas Butson	Bodinnick or Polruan	United Kingdom	For J. Moss.
August	Chile	Steamship	Messrs. Randolph, Elder & Co	Govan	United Kingdom	For Pacific Steam Navigation Company.
August	Cumberland	Clipper			United Kingdom	For private owner.
August	Fair Geraldine	Cutter	Messrs. Fife	Fairlie	United Kingdom	For Lord de Ros.
August	Fergus	Steamship	Messrs. A. Stephen & Sons	Kelvinhaugh	United Kingdom	For private owner.
August	Mariani	Steamship	T. B. Seath	River Clyde	United Kingdom	For Société Accélerée d'Haiti.
August	Otago	Steamship	J. G. Lawrie	Whiteinch	United Kingdom	For Intercolonial Royal Mail Steam Packet Co.
August	Royal Standard	Steamship	Messrs. Palmer, Brothers, & Co.	Newcastle upon Tyne	United Kingdom	For White Star Line.
August	Tripoli	Steamship	Messrs. J. & G. Thomson	Govan	United Kingdom	For Messrs. G. & J. Burns.
1 September	Daring	Schooner		Mangawhai	(United Kingdom of Great Britain and Ireland) New Zealand	For John Matheson & John Rattray.
1 September	Star of the Ocean	Brig	George Lungley	Southampton	United Kingdom	For Mr. Griffin.
3 September	Jefferson Davis	Steamship	John Robinson	Liverpool	United Kingdom	For Messrs. Philpott, Broadbent & Robinson.
3 September	Laurel	Steamship	Messrs. A. & J. Inglis	Port Glasgow	United Kingdom	For Glasgow and Londonderry Steam Packet Co.
3 September	Nutfield	Steamship	Messrs. James Asn & Co.	Isle of Dogs	United Kingdom	For private owner.
5 September	Regia	Merchantman	Messrs. Charles Hill & Sons	Bristol	United Kingdom	For C. C. Dawson.
12 September	Nola	Paddle steamer	Messrs. Caird & Co.	Greenock	United Kingdom	For private owner.
12 September	Tecumseh	Canonicus-class monitor	Secor and Company	Jersey City, New Jersey	United States	For United States Navy.
15 September	Alexandra	Paddle steamer	John Laird	Birkenhead	United Kingdom	For London and North Western Railway.
15 September	Beaufort	Barque	John Robinson	Sunderland	United Kingdom	For Henry Ellis.
15 September	Kankakee	Pawtuxet-class cutter	Westervelt & Son	New York	United States	For United States Revenue Marine.
15 September	Pembroke Castle	Merchantman	Messrs. Robert Napier & Son	Govan	United Kingdom	For Castle Line.
15 September	Principe di Carignano	Principe di Carignano-class ironclad	Cantiere della Foce	Genoa	Italy	For Regia Marina.
16 September	Brockham	Steamship	Messrs. Money, Wigram & Sons	Blackwall	United Kingdom	For Messrs. Phillips, Shaw & Lowther.
16 September	Delhi	Steamship	Messrs. Money, Wigram & Sons	Blackwall	United Kingdom	For Peninsular and Oriental Steam Navigation Company.
17 September	Victoria Cross	Full-rigged ship	Messrs. Pile, Spence & Co.	West Hartlepool	United Kingdom	For Messrs. Coupland Bros.
20 September	Amity	Steamship	Laing	Sunderland	United Kingdom	For private owner.
21 September	San Martino	Regina Maria Pia-class ironclad	Société Nouvelle des Forges et Chantiers de la Méditerranée	La Seyne	France	For Regia Marina.
23 September	Kewanee	Pawtuxet-class cutter	J. A. Robb & Co.	Baltimore, Maryland	United States	For United States Revenue Marine.
25 September	Amethyst	Merchantman	John Thompson	Sunderland	United Kingdom	For J. W. Legender.
26 September	John Liddell	Collier	Messrs. C. Mitchell & Co.	Low Walker	United Kingdom	For John Liddell and others.
26 September	Princess of Wales	Paddle steamer	Messrs. G. K. Stothert & Co.	Bristol	United Kingdom	For private owner.
28 September	Bolingbroke	Barque	Messrs. S. & H. Morton & Co.	Leith	United Kingdom	For private owner.
28 September	Cyclone	Yacht	Messrs. M. Ratsey & Sons	Cowes	United Kingdom	For Prince de Beauveau de Craon.
28 September	England	Barque	W. H. Pearson, or W. R. Pearson Jr.	Sunderland	United Kingdom	For James Ayre.
29 September	Kansas	Gunboat	Philadelphia Navy Yard	Philadelphia, Pennsylvania	United States	For United States Navy.
29 September	Olano	Barque	Harland & Wolff	Belfast	United Kingdom	For Larrinaga Steamship Co, or Messrs. Olano, Larrinagee & Co.
20 September	Roodee	East Indiaman		Chester	United Kingdom	For private owner.
September	Beatrice	Steamship	Messrs. M'Nab & Co	Greenock	United Kingdom	For Bristol and Cork Steam Navigation Company.
September	Hurricane	Merchantman			United Kingdom	For Thames and Mersey Line.
September	Scimitar	Merchantman	Messrs. Samuelson	Hull	United Kingdom	For private owner.
September	Terror dos Mares	Gunboat			Portugal	For Portuguese Navy.
September	Vicksburg	Tugboat			United States	For private owner.
September	Berar	Full-rigged ship	William Pile	Sunderland	United Kingdom	For G. D. Tyser.
1 October	Montrose	East Indiaman	Messrs. Barclay, Curle & Co.	Stobcross	United Kingdom	For Messrs. Charles George Cowie & Co.
2 October	Shamrock	Schooner	Messrs. R. S. Abbott & Co	Hull	United Kingdom	For Robert Gillan.
3 October	Alberta	Royal yacht	Fincham	Pembroke Dockyard	United Kingdom	For Queen Victoria.
3 October	Yang-tze	Clipper	Messrs. Hall	Aberdeen	United Kingdom	For Messrs. Killick & Martin.
6 October	Mary Scott	Merchantman	Messrs. Backhouse & Dixon	Middlesbrough	United Kingdom	For David Cooper Scott.
6 October	Nyack	Gunboat		New York Navy Yard	United States	For United States Navy.
7 October	Kitty of Coleraine	Tug	Harland & Wolff	Belfast	United Kingdom	For Lower Bann Steamboat Co.
13 October	Andalusia	Steamship	Messrs. Swan & Co.	Maryhill	United Kingdom	For Messrs. Mories, Munro & Co.
13 October	Palestine	Barque	Harland & Wolff	Belfast	United Kingdom	For W. H. Tindall.
13 October	Sarah Ann Dickenson	Schooner	John Gibson	Fleetwood	United Kingdom	For Richard Warbrick, Fell & Co. and others.
13 October	Ullswater	Snow	Gibbon & Nichol	Hylton	United Kingdom	For Longton & Co.
14 October	Manhattan	Monitor	Perine, Secor & Co.	New York	United States	For United States Navy.
14 October	Savoir Faire	East Indiaman	Messrs. T. Royden & Sons	Liverpool	United Kingdom	For Messrs. G. H. Fletcher & Co.
14 October	Valiant	Hector-class ironclad	Thames Ironworks	Leamouth	United Kingdom	For Royal Navy.
14 October	Yarland	Schooner	Messrs. Camper & Nicholson	Gosport	United Kingdom	For John Gray.
15 October	Caractacus	Chinaman	Messrs. R. J. Evans	Liverpool	United Kingdom	For Messrs E. and C. Friend & Co.
15 October	Chevy Chase	Merchantman	Messrs. Vernon	Liverpool	United Kingdom	For Messrs. Blythe Bros.
15 October	City of Brisbane	Paddle steamer	Messrs. A. & J. Inglis	Glasgow	United Kingdom	For Australian Steam Navigation Company.
15 October	Lafayette	Paddle steamer	Messrs. Scott	Greenock	United Kingdom	For Compagnie Générale Transatlantiques.
15 October	Wallabi	Steamship	Messrs. A. & J. Inglis	Glasgow	United Kingdom	For Australian Steam Navigation Company.
19 October	Vienne	Moselle-class transport	Forges et Chantiers de la Méditerranée	La Seyne	France	For French Navy.
19 October	Ertuğrul	Frigate	Taşkızak Shipyard	Golden Horn	Ottoman Empire	For Ottoman Navy.
20 October	Peoria	Sassacus-class gunboat	New York Navy Yard	New York	United States	For United States Navy
24 October	Lord Clyde	Paddle steamer	Messrs. Caird & Co.	Greenock	United Kingdom	For Glasgow and Dublin Steam Navigation Company.
27 October	Carolina	Steamship	Messrs. Palmer & Co.	Jarrow	United Kingdom	For Fernie Bros.
27 October	Fy Chow	Clipper	Messrs. A. Hall & Co.	Aberdeen	United Kingdom	For Messrs. Dunbar & Co.
27 October	Tiger	Steamship	Mr. Scott	Inverkeithing	United Kingdom	For Mr. Mateos.
27 October	Will-o'-the-Wisp	Paddle steamer	Messrs. W. Simons & Co	Renfrew	United Kingdom	For private owner.
28 October	Greyhound	Steamship	Messrs. Kirkpatrick, M'Intyre & Co.	Port Glasgow	United Kingdom	For Messrs. Robert Little & Co.
28 October	Invercauld	Clipper	John Smith	Aberdeen	United Kingdom	For private owners.
28 October	Mary Blake	Schooner	John Barter	Brixham	United Kingdom	For William R. Pearce, William Varwell and others.
29 October	Caledonia	Steamship	Messrs. Tod & MacGregor	Partick	United Kingdom	For Messrs Handyside & Henderson.
29 October	Countess of Ripon	East Indiaman	Messrs. Samuel, Son, & Co	Hull	United Kingdom	For Messrs. Handyside & Henderson.
29 October	Earl de Grey and Ripon	Steamship	Messrs. Samuel, Son, & Co.	Hull	United Kingdom	For private owner.
29 October	Lightning	East Indiaman	Messrs. Samuel, Son, & Co.	Hull	United Kingdom	For private owner.
29 October	Pampero	Steamship	Messrs. James & George Thomson	Govan	United Kingdom	For Glasgow Emancipation Society. Seized by the Board of Customs on suspicion of being a Confederate warship.
29 October	Provence	Provence-class ironclad	Arsenal de Toulon	Toulon	France	For French Navy.
31 October	Alfred	Paddle steamer	Messrs. Caird & Co.	Greenock	United Kingdom	For Bristol General Steam Navigation Company.
31 October	Far East	Steamship	Messrs. Dudgeon	Cubitt Town	United Kingdom	For Messrs. Dunbar.
31 October	Pallas	Steamship	Messrs. Dudgeon	Cubitt Town	United Kingdom	For Messrs. Dunbar.
October	Accidental Star	Merchantman	J. Barkes	Sunderland	United Kingdom	For J. Barkes.
October	Andalusia	Steamship	Messrs. Swan & Co.	Maryhill	United Kingdom	For Messrs. Mories, Munro & Co.
October	Bellona	Brig		Prince Edward Island	(United Kingdom of Great Britain and Ireland) Colony of Prince Edward Island	For private owner.
October	North Carolina	Ironclad gunboat	Berry & Brothers	Wilmington, North Carolina	Confederate States of America	For Confederate States Navy.
October	Pewabic	Steamship	Peck & Masters	Cleveland, Ohio	United States	For Pioneer Line.
October	Sorrento	Full-rigged ship		Kennebunkportt, Maine	United States	For private owner.
October	Waipara	Cargo ship	Harland & Wolff	Belfast	United Kingdom	For J. Ritchie & Co.
October	Western Belle	Barque	John Haws	Miramichi	(United Kingdom of Great Britain and Ireland) Colony of New Brunswick	For private owner.
5 November	Arrow	Paddle steamer	Messrs. Aitken & Mansell	Whiteinch	United Kingdom	For private owner.
7 November	Miss Kilmansegg	Schooner	Messrs. A. M'Millan & Sons	Dumbarton	United Kingdom	For private owner.
9 November	Northern Queen	Barque	J. H. Watson	Sunderland	United Kingdom	For James Gibson.
10 November	Golden Sunset	Barque	William Doxford	Sunderland	United Kingdom	For Wilson & Co.
10 November	Jeannie Marshall	Schooner	Messrs. J. & R. Swan	Kelvindock	United Kingdom	For Messrs Hay & Burrell & Son.
11 November	Albatross	Steamship	Messrs. Barclay, Curle & Co.	Stobcross	United Kingdom	For Messrs. Cowan & Co.
11 November	Euryale	Génie-class brig		Rochefort	France	For French Navy.
11 November	Sir Jamsetjee Family	East Indiaman	Messrs. Alexander Stephen & Sons	Dundee	United Kingdom	For Cursetjee Furdonjee.
11 November	Southern Cross	Steamship	Messrs. J. &. G. Thomson	Govan	United Kingdom	For Tasmanian Steam Navigation Company.
13 November	J. T. Stockdale	Paddle steamer		West Brownsville, Pennsylvania	United States	For B. T. Laughlin et al.
14 November	Arabia	Steamship	Messrs. William Denny & Bros.	Dumbarton	United Kingdom	For British India Steam Navigation Company.
14 November	Euterpe	Full-rigged	Gibson, McDonald & Arnold	Ramsey	Isle of Man	for Wakefield, Nash & Company.
14 November	Harmston	Brig	Mackern	Marsh End	United Kingdom	For private owner.
14 November	South Easter	Clipper	Messrs. Lawrence Hill & Co.	Port Glasgow	United Kingdom	For Messrs. James Jamieson & Co.
16 November	Smyrna	Steamship	Messrs. A. Leslie & Co.	Hebburn	United Kingdom	For private owner.
19 November	Numancia	Ironclad	Société Nouvelle des Forges et Chantiers de la Méditerranée	La Seyne	France	For Spanish Navy.
25 November	Formby	East Indiaman	Messrs. Jones, Queggan & Co.	Liverpool	United Kingdom	For Messrs. C. S. Lemon & Co.
25 November	Hope	Paddle steamer	Messrs. Jones, Queggan & Co	Liverpool	United Kingdom	For Messrs Fraser, Trenholm & Co.
28 November	Dolbadern Castle	Full-rigged ship	T. R. Oswald & Co.	Pallion	United Kingdom	For Oriental Shipping Association.
28 November	Tallahoma	Sassacus-class gunboat		Brooklyn Navy Yard	United States	For United States Navy.
November	Agamemnon	Brig	Messrs. Smith & Rodger	Glasgow	United Kingdom	For private owner.
November	Neuse	Ironclad ram			Confederate States of America	For Confederate States Navy.
November	Protector	Steamship	T. B. Seath	River Clyde	United Kingdom	For private owner.
November	Quito	Paddle steamer	Messrs. Randolph, Elder & Co.	Gova	United Kingdom	For Pacific Steam Navigation Company.
November	Sebastopol	Frigate		Kronstadt	Russia	For Imperial Russian Navy.
November	Wellington	Steamship	Messrs. Blackwood & Gordon	Port Glasgow	United Kingdom	For New Zealand Steam Navigation Company (limited).
2 December	Rhoda	Steamship	Messrs. M'Nab & Co.	Greenock	United Kingdom	For private owner.
9 December	Maritana	Schooner	Messrs. Miller	Gloucester	United Kingdom	For Messrs. Ivens & Chessell.
9 December	Tiel	Steamship	Messrs. James Brown & Co.	Kirkcaldy	United Kingdom	For Kirkcaldy and Leith Steam Packet Company.
10 December	Héroïne	Provence-class ironclad	Arsenal de Lorient	Lorient	France	For French Navy.
10 December	Julia	Paddle steamer	Messrs. W. Simons & Co.	Renfrew	United Kingdom	For private owner.
10 December	Tarn	Sarthe-class horse transport	Arsenal de Toulon	Toulon	France	For French Navy.
12 December	Var	Ardèche-class horse transport	Chantiers Arman	Bordeaux	France	For French Navy.
12 December	Minotaur	Minotaur-class ironclad	Thames Ironworks and Shipbuilding Company	Leamouth	United Kingdom	For Royal Navy.
13 December	Comus	Barque	J. M. Reed	Sunderland	United Kingdom	For Mr. Thompson.
13 December	Yeavering Bell	Barque	J. Gill	Sunderland	United Kingdom	For Mr. Fenwick.
14 December	Saint Fillans	Full-rigged ship	Messrs. Batchelor Bros.	Cardiff	United Kingdom	For Messrs. T. & W. Stewart.
16 December	Saugus	Canonicus-class monitor	Harlan & Hollingsworth	Wilmington, Delaware	United States	For United States Navy.
21 December	Algonquin	Sassacus-class gunboat		New York Navy Yard	United States	For United States Navy.
22 December	City of Adelaide	Steamship	Messrs. J. & G. Thomson	Govan	United Kingdom	For Australasian Steam Navigation Company.
23 December	Achilles	Frigate	O. W. Lang	Chatham Dockyard	United Kingdom	For Royal Navy.
24 December	Eothen	Steam yacht	James Ash & Sons	Blackwall	United Kingdom	For Arthur Anderson.
24 December	Royal Arthur	Full-rigged ship	James Laing	Sunderland	United Kingdom	For H. Fernie & Son.
24 December	Shepherdess	Brig	David Burns	Aberdeen	United Kingdom	For John Smith.
24 December	Taeping	Clipper	Robert Steele & Company	Greenock	United Kingdom	For Alexander Rodger.
29 December	Dictator	Monitor	Delamater Iron Works	New York	United States	For United States Navy.
29 December	Yuen Tze Fee	Steamship	Messrs. Blackwood & Gordon	Port Glasgow	United Kingdom	For Messrs. Trautmann & Co.
30 December	Middleton	Merchantman	W. H. Pearson	Sunderland	United Kingdom	For Cowell & Dixon.
December	Albion	Steamship	Messrs. Scott & Sons	Greenock	United Kingdom	For private owner.
December	Appleton	Full-rigged ship	Messrs. Duncan Todd & Co.	Port Glasgow	United Kingdom	For private owner.
December	Busheer	Steamship	Messrs. Aitken & Mansell	Whiteinch	United Kingdom	For British India Steam Navigation Company.
December	Constance Decima	Paddle steamer	Messrs. Scott & Co'	Greenock	United Kingdom	For private owner.
December	Cornelius	Full-rigged ship	John Batchelor, or Batchelor Bros.	Cardiff	United Kingdom	For private owner.
December	Little Ada	Steamship	Messrs. W. Simons & Co.	Renfrew	United Kingdom	For private owner.
December	Pioneer	Brig	J. & R. Bailey	Shoreham-by-Sea	United Kingdom	For Thomas Gates & Co.
December	Sea Bride	Barque			United States	For private owner.
Unknown date	Abbotsford	Clipper	William Pickersgill	Sunderland	United Kingdom	For Mr. Adamson, or Tasmanian Line.
Unknown date	Able Seaman	Merchantman	T. R. Oswald	Sunderland	United Kingdom	For Temperley & Co.
Unknown date	Admiral	Steamship	S. H. Pook	Fair Haven, Connecticut	United States	For private owner.
Unknown date	Aërolite	Yacht		Wandsworth	United Kingdom	For private owner.
Unknown date	Agincourt	Barque	William Doxford	Sunderland	United Kingdom	For A. Strong.
Unknown date	Ajax		Neafie and Levy	Philadelphia, Pennsylvania	United States	
Unknown date	Albert de Groat	Tug		Buffalo, New York	United States	For private owner.
Unknown date	Albert the Good	Barque	W. Barkley	Sunderland	United Kingdom	For R. Porrett.
Unknown date	Albert William	Merchantman	James Laing	Sunderland	United Kingdom	For Wilson & Co.
Unknown date	Alexander			Renfrew	United Kingdom	
Unknown date	Alexander	Merchantman	G. Short	Sunderland	United Kingdom	For Swan Bros.
Unknown date	Alexandra	Brig		Prince Edward Island	(United Kingdom of Great Britain and Ireland) Colony of Prince Edward Island	For private owner.
Unknown date	Alford	Steamship	Messrs. Palmer	Jarrow	United Kingdom	For Black Ball Line.
Unknown date	Alfred A Wotkyns	Tug	Lewis Hagland	New Brunswick, New Jersey	United States	For private owner.
Unknown date	Alice Dean	Paddle steamer		Cincinnati, Ohio	United States	For Thompson Dean.
Unknown date	Alice Holden	Brig		Liverpool	United Kingdom	For private owner.
Unknown date	America				Germany	For Norddeutscher Lloyd.
Unknown date	Analyst	Merchantman	Robert Thompson & Sons	Sunderland	United Kingdom	For Burnett & Co.
Unknown date	Angelina	Barque	William Briggs & Son	Sunderland	United Kingdom	For Wood & Co.
Unknown date	Annabella	Merchantman	W. Chilton	Sunderland	United Kingdom	For W. White.
Unknown date	Annette	Paddle tug	James Ash & Sons	Blackwall	United Kingdom	For William Watkins.
Unknown date	Aoa	Barque	W. White	Sunderland	United Kingdom	For Warden & Co.
Unknown date	Appelina	Merchantman	W. Chilton	Sunderland	United Kingdom	For T. Scott.
Unknown date	Arab Steed	Full-rigged ship	William Pile Jr.	Sunderland	United Kingdom	For Walker & Co.
Unknown date	Argosy	Sternwheeler		Monongahela, Pennsylvania	United States	For private owner.
Unknown date	Argosy No.2	Paddle steamer		Monongahela, Pennsylvania	United States	For private owner.
Unknown date	Armeria	Merchantman	J. Haswell	Sunderland	United Kingdom	For Ayre & Co.
Unknown date	Arthur H. Gordon	Clipper			United Kingdom	For private owner.
Unknown date	Artibonite	Steamship	Seath	River Clyde	United Kingdom	For Société Accélérée d'Haiti.
Unknown date	Augusta Dinsmore	Steamship		Mystic, Connecticut	United States	For Adams Express Company
Unknown date	Avenger	Gunboat		New Albany, Indiana	United States	For United States Navy
Unknown date	Banker	Sternwheeler		Cincinnati, Ohio	United States	For private owner.
Unknown date	Bedfordshire	Merchantman	J. Smurthwaite	Sunderland	United Kingdom	For Green & Co.
Unknown date	Belle of the South	Merchantman	T. Stonehouse	Sunderland	United Kingdom	For S. & H. Osbourn.
Unknown date	Benefit	Paddle steamer		Metropolis, Illinois	United States	For Edward Buse.
Unknown date	Ben Gaylord	Sternwheeler		Cincinnati, Ohio	United States	For private owner.
Unknown date	Beth Shan	Merchantman	W. Pile	Sunderland	United Kingdom	For W. Brass.
Unknown date	Boatswain	Snow	J. Denniston	Sunderland	United Kingdom	For Mr. Crawford.
Unknown date	Burmah	Steamship	Messrs. William Denny & Bros.	Dumbarton	United Kingdom	For private owner.
Unknown date	Caddo	Gunboat		Galveston, Texas	Confederate States of America	For Confederate States Navy.
Unknown date	Canada	Merchantman	W. Pile	Sunderland	United Kingdom	For Mr. Douglass.
Unknown date	Caranjah	Merchantman	J. Smurthwaite	Sunderland	United Kingdom	For Riley & Co.
Unknown date	Caravan	Barque	J. Robinson	Sunderland	United Kingdom	For Alex Smith & Co.
Unknown date	Charles Edward	Paddle Steamer	Messrs. Archibald Denny & Son	Dumbarton	United Kingdom	For private owner.
Unknown date	Charleston	Ironclad	James M. Eason	Charleston, South Carolina	Confederate States of America	For Confederate States Navy.
Unknown date	Chattahoochee	Gunboat		Saffold, Georgia	Confederate States of America	For Confederate States Navy.
Unknown date	Chaudiere	Merchantman	William Doxford	Sunderland	United Kingdom	For H. Douglas.
Unknown date	Christine	Merchantman	G. & J. Mills	Sunderland	United Kingdom	For Hankey & Co.
Unknown date	City of London	Paddle tug	James Ash & Sons	Blackwall	United Kingdom	For Charles C. Nelson.
Unknown date	Clara Clarita	Steam yacht	Lawrence & Foulks	Brooklyn, New York	United States	For Leonard Jerome.
Unknown date	Clematis	Tug		Cleveland, Ohio	United States	For private owner.
Unknown date	Cleughs	Barque	J. Davison	Sunderland	United Kingdom	For R. Cleugh.
Unknown date	Colombo	Merchantman	John Blumer	Sunderland	United Kingdom	For Davison & Co.
Unknown date	Colorado	Merchantman	W. Pile	Sunderland	United Kingdom	For John Hay.
Unknown date	Columbus	Tug	Messrs. Laird Bros.	Birkenhead	United Kingdom	For private owner.
Unknown date	Commodore	Paddle steamer		New Orleans, Louisiana	United States	For private owner.
Unknown date	Conchita	Merchantman	Rawson & Watson	Sunderland	United Kingdom	For P. Anduiza .
Unknown date	Concordia	Merchantman	T. R. Oswald	Sunderland	United Kingdom	For Gerardo & Co.
Unknown date	Conrad	Merchantman	J. Haswell	Sunderland	United Kingdom	For D. Davison.
Unknown date	Coonatto	Full-rigged ship	Thomas Bilbe & William Perry	Rotherhithe	United Kingdom	For Anderson, Thompson & Co.
Unknown date	Coronella	Merchantman	Sykes & Co	Sunderland	United Kingdom	For Mr. Hopper.
Unknown date	Cossipore	Cliper	Messrs. Pile, Spence & Co	West Hartlepool	United Kingdom	For Aberdeen Clipper Line.
Unknown date	Coya	Clipper	Messrs. Dudgeon & Co.	Limehouse	United Kingdom	For Messrs. Green, Robinson & Co.
Unknown date	Crixea	Merchantman	J. Haswell	Sunderland	United Kingdom	For P. Patmore.
Unknown date	Crusader	Merchantman	James Robinson	Sunderland	United Kingdom	For Gibson & Sons.
Unknown date	Dai Ching	Steamship	James C. Dewett & Co.		United States	For Henry Gamaliel Ward.
Unknown date	David	Torpedo boat	T. Stoney	Charleston, South Carolina	Confederate States of America	For Confederate States Navy.
Unknown date	Day Star	Barque	William Pickersgill	Sunderland	United Kingdom	For Anderson & Co.
Unknown date	Defiance	Paddle steamer	Messrs. William Denny & Bros.	Dumbarton	United Kingdom	For private owner.
Unknown date	Diamond	Merchantman	William Doxford	Sunderland	United Kingdom	For Wheatley & Co.
Unknown date	Dora	Barque	W. Adamson	Sunderland	United Kingdom	For Nicholson & Co.
Unknown date	Eastern Queen	Merchantman	J. Smurthwaite	Sunderland	United Kingdom	For Swainston & Co.
Unknown date	Eclipse	Schooner	Brundrit & Whiteway	Runcorn	United Kingdom	For Brundrit & Whiteway.
Unknown date	Egeria	Merchantman	Ratcliff	Sunderland	United Kingdom	For T. Alcock.
Unknown date	Egyptian	Merchantman	Peter Austin	Sunderland	United Kingdom	For J. & P. Dove.
Unknown date	El Caco	Steamship	Messrs. Archibald Denny & Sons	Dumbarton	United Kingdom	For private owner.
Unknown date	Elisa	Merchantman	A. Simey	Sunderland	United Kingdom	For "F. del Rib'ro".
Unknown date	Elizabeth	Barque	William Briggs & Son	Sunderland	United Kingdom	For Joshua Bros.
Unknown date	Elizabeth Henderson	Snow	B. Hodgson	Sunderland	United Kingdom	For Henderson & Co.
Unknown date	Eliza Shaw	Clipper	Messrs. A. Stephen & Sons	Kelvinhaugh	United Kingdom	For private owner.
Unknown date	Ellen Southard	Full-rigged ship	T. J. Southard	Richmond, Maine	United States	For T. J. Southard.
Unknown date	El Tousin	Ram	Messrs. Laird & Co.	Birkenhead	United Kingdom	Claimed to be for French Navy, but seized by the Board of Customs as a suspected Confederate warship.
Unknown date	Emma Brown	Paddle steamer			United States	For private owner.
Unknown date	Eschol	Merchantman	D. A. Douglas	Sunderland	United Kingdom	For Tyzack & Co.
Unknown date	Esk	Merchantman	T. R. Oswald	Sunderland	United Kingdom	For Currie & Co.
Unknown date	Essex	Full-rigged ship	George Marshall	Sunderland	United Kingdom	For George Marshall.
Unknown date	Ethel	Barque	Rawson & Watson	Sunderland	United Kingdom	For W. Ord Jr.
Unknown date	Eva	Merchantman	A. Simey	Sunderland	United Kingdom	For private owner.
Unknown date	Evelyn Wood	Barque	G. & J. Mills	Sunderland	United Kingdom	For Ritson & Co.
Unknown date	Fair Leader	Merchantman	D. A. Douglast	Sunderland	United Kingdom	For R. Hill.
Unknown date	Fanny	Barque	G. Gardner	Sunderland	United Kingdom	For H. Holmes.
Unknown date	Fanny Barker	Sternwheeler		Cincinnati, Ohio	United States	For private owner.
Unknown date	Fitzroy	Barque	G. Peverall	Sunderland	United Kingdom	For Adamson & Ronaldson.
Unknown date	Florence Miller II	Sternwheeler		Cincinnati, Ohio	United States	For private owner.
Unknown date	Flying Scud	Merchantman	Robert Thompson & Sons	Sunderland	United Kingdom	For W. Thompson.
Unknown date	Fredericksburg	Ironclad		Richmond, Virginia	Confederate States of America	For Confederate States Navy.
Unknown date	Fred Wheeler	Tug		Philadelphia, Pennsylvania	United States	For private owner.
Unknown date	Fuchsia	Tug	Fincourt	New York	United States	For Henry Gamaliel Ward.
Unknown date	Fuchsia	Merchantman	G. Bartram	Sunderland	United Kingdom	For G. Bartram.
Unknown date	Fulix	Merchantman	B. Hodgson	Sunderland	United Kingdom	For Walker & Co.
Unknown date	Gazelle	Merchantman	Gray & Young	Sunderland	United Kingdom	For Farrow & Co.
Unknown date	General Grant	Paddle steamer		Monongahela, Pennsylvania	United States	For private owner.
Unknown date	General Lee	Steamship	James Laing	Sunderland	United Kingdom	For Palgrave & Co.
Unknown date	Georgia	Floating battery		Savannah, Georgia	Confederate States of America	For Confederate States Navy.
Unknown date	Georgiana	Steamship	Lawrie	Glasgow	United Kingdom	For N. Matheson.
Unknown date	Gertrude			Greenock	United Kingdom	
Unknown date	Gladiolus	Barque	James Robinson	Sunderland	United Kingdom	For J. Robinson.
Unknown date	Glaucus	Steamship	Van Deusen Bros	New York	United States	For the Neptune Steamship Company.
Unknown date	Glide	Tug	Reaney, Son & Archbold	Philadelphia, Pennsylvania	United States	For private owner.
Unknown date	Glide	Steamship		Murraysville, Virginia	United States	For private owner.
Unknown date	Golden Fleece	Barque	W. Pile	Sunderland	United Kingdom	For Ellis & Co.
Unknown date	Governor Buckingham	Hermaphrodite brig	Messrs. Maxon, Fish & Co.	Mystic, Connecticut	United States	For United States Navy.
Unknown date	Great Western	Tanker		Newcastle upon Tyne	United Kingdom	For Petroleum Trading Company.
Unknown date	Hartford	Paddle steamer		Cincinnati, Ohio	United States	For private owner.
Unknown date	Harvest Moon	Paddle steamer		Portland, Maine	United States	For Charles Spear.
Unknown date	Helen White	Merchantman	T. Robson	Sunderland	United Kingdom	For G. White.
Unknown date	Hesse Darmstadt	Merchantman	Taylor & Scouter	Sunderland	United Kingdom	For Mr. Avery.
Unknown date	Himalaya	Full-rigged ship	Pile, Hay & Co.	Sunderland	United Kingdom	For G. D. Tyser.
Unknown date	Hindoostan	Merchantman	J. Gill	Sunderland	United Kingdom	For Mr. Milburn.
Unknown date	Hudsons	Schooner	William Pickersgill	Sunderland	United Kingdom	For Hudson & Co.
Unknown date	Innes	Tug		Philadelphia, Pennsylvania	United States	For Aaron Innes.
Unknown date	Irene	Steamship	Messrs. Archibald Denny & Sons	Dumbarton	United Kingdom	For Private owner.
Unknown date	Iser	Barque	J. Errington	Sunderland	United Kingdom	For Johnson & Co.
Unknown date	James Cuckow	Merchantman	L. T. Wang	Sunderland	United Kingdom	For J. & W. Cuckow.
Unknown date	James Lamb	Barque	J. Hardie	Sunderland	United Kingdom	For J. Doward & Co.
Unknown date	James Longton	Barque	J. Hardie	Sunderland	United Kingdom	For Longton & Co.
Unknown date	James Ovington	Merchantman	J. Hardie	Sunderland	United Kingdom	For private owner.
Unknown date	James William	Merchantman	Reay & Naisby	Sunderland	United Kingdom	For Mr. Thompson.
Unknown date	J. E. Bazely	Tug		Gloucester, New Jersey	United States	For private owner.
Unknown date	Jemima	Barque	R. H. Potts & Bros	Sunderland	United Kingdom	For Messrs. Potts Bros.
Unknown date	Jessie Scott	Barque	Todd & Brown	North Hylton	United Kingdom	For Johnston & Co.
Unknown date	Jessie Stowe	Merchantman	T. R. Oswald	Sunderland	United Kingdom	For Hargrove & Co.
Unknown date	John A Dix	Paddle steamer		Newburgh	United States	For private owner.
Unknown date	John T Jenkins	Tug		New Brunswick, New Jersey	United States	For private owner.
Unknown date	Kate Holmes	Merchantman	Reay & Naisby	Sunderland	United Kingdom	For Holmes & Co.
Unknown date	Kung Mau	Schooner			United Kingdom	For private owner.
Unknown date	Lady Beatrix	Merchantman	builder	Sunderland	United Kingdom	For Earl of Durham.
Unknown date	L'Estère	Steamship	Thomas B. Seath	Rutherglen	United Kingdom	For Société Accélerée d'Haiti.
Unknown date	Light of the Age	Barque	Robert Thompson Jr.	Sunderland	United Kingdom	For Turner & Co.
Unknown date	Lilac	Tug		Philadelphia, Pennsylvania	United States	For private owner.
Unknown date	Lilian	Paddle steamer		River Clyde	United Kingdom	For private owner.
Unknown date	Lord Clyde	Merchantman	R. Pace	Sunderland	United Kingdom	For Rankin & Co.
Unknown date	Lorton Vale	Merchantman	W. Naizby	Sunderland	United Kingdom	For M. Patten.
Unknown date	Luke Hoyt	Tug		Philadelphia, Pennsylvania	United States	for private owner.
Unknown date	Luzon	Barque	W. Adamson	Sunderland	United Kingdom	For Mr. Adamson.
Unknown date	Magna Charta	Merchantman	James Robinson	Sunderland	United Kingdom	For H. Eggleston.
Unknown date	Maria Luck	Merchantman	Gray & Young	Sunderland	United Kingdom	For J. Luck.
Unknown date	Marigold	Tug		Philadelphia, Pennsylvania	United States	For private owner.
Unknown date	Marion	Barque	J. Davison	Sunderland	United Kingdom	For Tully & Co.
Unknown date	Martha Jackson	Barque	James Laing	Sunderland	United Kingdom	For Hargrove & Co.
Unknown date	Mary Grandy	Tug]	Ira Lafrinier	Cleveland, Ohio	United States	For private owner.
Unknown date	Mary Jane	Schooner	Crinson Bros	Sunderland	United Kingdom	For J. Crinson.
Unknown date	Mary Lawson	Brigantine	William Briggs & Son	Sunderland	United Kingdom	For Mr. Thompson.
Unknown date	Mattabesett	Sassacus-class gunboat	A. & G. T. Sampson	Boston, Massachusetts	United States	For United States Navy.
Unknown date	Mercator	Merchantman	J. Robinson	Sunderland	United Kingdom	For Hargrove & Co.
Unknown date	Meteor	Paddle steamer		Newburgh, New York	United States	For James How and C. W. Copeland.
Unknown date	Millwall	Clipper	Millwall Company	Millwall	United Kingdom	For Black Ball Line.
Unknown date	Morning Star	Merchantman	B. Hodgson	Sunderland	United Kingdom	For Brown & Co.
Unknown date	Mount Carmel	Barque	Peter Austin	Sunderland	United Kingdom	For Langridge & Co.
Unknown date	Nashville	Nashville-class ironclad		Montgomery, Alabama	Confederate States of America	For Confederate States Navy.
Unknown date	Naumkeag	Sternwheeler		Cincinnati, Ohio	United States	For Allen Collier.
Unknown date	Neptune	Cutter			United Kingdom	
Unknown date	Nereus	Steamship	New York Navy Yard	New York	United States	For William P. Williams.
Unknown date	Never Despair	Merchantman	J. Lister	Sunderland	United Kingdom	For R. Milburn.
Unknown date	Noor Jehan	Barque	J. Errington	Sunderland	United Kingdom	For Fairley Bros.
Unknown date	Novelty	Paddle steamer	P. N. Russell & Co.	Sydney	(United Kingdom of Great Britain and Ireland) New South Wales	For Peter Nicol Russell.
Unknown date	Nutfield	Steamship	James Ash & Sons	Blackwall	United Kingdom	For G. P. Stringer and others.
Unknown date	Nyanza	Paddle steamer		Belle Vernon, Pennsylvania	United States	For private owner.
Unknown date	Nymph	Sternwheeler		Cincinnati, Ohio	United States	For private owner.
Unknown date	Ocean King	Merchantman	W. Pile	Sunderland	United Kingdom	For Bell & Co.
Unknown date	Oceola	Merchantman	A. Simey	Sunderland	United Kingdom	For Mr. Hick.
Unknown date	Ogeechee	Gunboat	Henry F. Willink	Savannah, Georgia	Confederate States of America	For Confederate States Navy.
Unknown date	Ohio Valley	Paddle steamer		Harmer, Ohio	United States	For Theodore Johnson.
Unknown date	Olive Branch	Merchantman	John Blumer	Sunderland	United Kingdom	For F. Reay.
Unknown date	Oneonta	Paddle steamer	Samuel Forman	Celilo, Oregon	United States	For Oregon Steam Navigation Company.
Unknown date	Oribe	Merchantman	W. Ratcliffe	Sunderland	United Kingdom	For G. Walker.
Unknown date	Orissa	Steamship	Messrs. William Denny & Bros.	Dumbarton	United Kingdom	For private owner.
Unknown date	Parana	Merchantman	Messrs. A. M'Millan & Son	Dumbarton	United Kingdom	For private owner.
Unknown date	Pelotas	Merchantman	G. Gardner	Sunderland	United Kingdom	For Kelso & Co.
Unknown date	Pendennis	Paddle tug	James Ash & Sons	Blackwall	United Kingdom	For R. Taylor.
Unknown date	Peter B Van Houten	Steamship		Brooklyn, New York	United States	For T. F. Rowland.
Unknown date	Petropavlosk	Frigate			Russia	For Imperial Russian Navy.
Unknown date	Piccadilly	Merchantman	Taylor & Scouter	Sunderland	United Kingdom	For Mr. Macdonald.
Unknown date	Pioneer	Gunboat	Australian Steam Navigation Company	Sydney	(United Kingdom of Great Britain and Ireland) New South Wales	for the New Zealand Colonial Government.
Unknown date	Polar Star	Paddle steamer		Brooklyn, New York	United States	For private owner.
Unknown date	Pontiac	Steamship		Wilmington, Delaware	United States	For W. A. James & Co.
Unknown date	Pontiac	Sassacus-class gunboat	Hillman & Streaker	Philadelphia, Pennsylvania	United States	For United States Navy.
Unknown date	Princess	Sternwheeler		Freedom, Pennsylvania	United States	For F. Martin.
Unknown date	Princess Alexandra	Merchantman	Todd & Brown	Sunderland	United Kingdom	For Whitefield & Co.
Unknown date	Princess Beatrice	Barque	Robert Thompson Jr.	Sunderland	United Kingdom	For W. Watson.
Unknown date	Princess of Wales	Barque	Rutter & Cummings	Sunderland	United Kingdom	For Mr. Jobling.
Unknown date	Progress	Merchantman	J. M. Reed	Sunderland	United Kingdom	For Mr. Dobbingv.
Unknown date	Prosperous	Merchantman	Sykes & Co	Sunderland	United Kingdom	For W. Shotton.
Unknown date	Pyrus	Merchantman	T. Stonehouse	Sunderland	United Kingdom	For Mr. Rowntree.
Unknown date	Queen of Ceylon	Merchantman	W. Naizby	Sunderland	United Kingdom	For G. Maule.
Unknown date	Queen of Peace	Merchantman	Taylor & Scouter	Sunderland	United Kingdom	For Barras & Co.
Unknown date	Rachel Miller	Sternwheeler		Cincinnati, Ohio	United States	For private owner.
Unknown date	Regalia	Merchantman	Rawson & Watson	Sunderland	United Kingdom	For Stoker & Co.
Unknown date	R. F. Loper	Tug		Philadelphia, Pennsylvania	United States	For private owner.
Unknown date	Robert Gaskin	Merchantman			(United Kingdom of Great Britain and Ireland) Province of Canada	For private owner.
Unknown date	Rodolph	Sternwheeler		Cincinnati, Ohio	United States	For private owner.
Unknown date	Rose of Denmark	Merchantman	S. Metcalf	Sunderland	United Kingdom	For Evans & Son.
Unknown date	Royal Mint	Merchantman	J. Errington	Sunderland	United Kingdom	For Dando & Co.
Unknown date	Royal Sailor	Merchantman	B. & J. Gardner	Sunderland	United Kingdom	For Mr. Dawson.
Unknown date	Ruby	Merchantman	W. Richardson	Sunderland	United Kingdom	For Mr. Weatherley.
Unknown date	Ruth	Merchantman	Taylor & Scouter	Sunderland	United Kingdom	For Mr. Cothay.
Unknown date	Sabrina	Schooner	T. White	Cowes	United Kingdom	For private owner.
Unknown date	Sailor's Bride	Merchantman	Peter Austin	Sunderland	United Kingdom	For T. Walker.
Unknown date	Santon	Merchantman	W. Pile	Sunderland	United Kingdom	For Wilson & Co.
Unknown date	Sarah	Merchantman	W. Pile	Sunderland	United Kingdom	For Messrs. Joshua Bros.
Unknown date	Scotia	Steamship	Messrs. William Denny & Bros.	Dumbarton	United Kingdom	For private owner.
Unknown date	Sarah S. B. Gary	Paddle steamer		Haddam, Connecticut	United States	For private owner.
Unknown date	Sattara	Merchantman	T. R. Oswald	Sunderland	United Kingdom	For M. I. Wilson.
Unknown date	Saxon	Merchantman	George Barker	Sunderland	United Kingdom	For J. Rodham.
Unknown date	Scimitar	Clipper	Messrs. Hall	Aberdeen	United Kingdom	For Passengers' Line.
Unknown date	Scioto	Gunboat		Cincinnati, Ohio	United States	For United States Navy.
Unknown date	Sea Ripple	Schooner	G. Gardner	Sunderland	United Kingdom	For Macdonald & Co.
Unknown date	Sea Skimmer	Barque	Robert Thompson & Sons	Sunderland	United Kingdom	For W. Thompson.
Unknown date	Sea Sprite	Merchantman	W. Chilton	Sunderland	United Kingdom	For Jones & Co.
Unknown date	Seaton	Merchantman	J. Robinson	Sunderland	United Kingdom	For R. Bowness.
Unknown date	Serica	Clipper	Robert Steele & Company	Greenock	United Kingdom	For James Findlay.
Unknown date	Signal	Steamship		East Haddam, Connecticut	United States	For George W. Jewett.
Unknown date	Silvia	East Indiaman	Messrs. T. Royden & Sons	Liverpool	United Kingdom	For Messrs. G. H. Fletcher & Co.
Unknown date	Sir Harry Parkes	Full-rigged ship	William Briggs & Son	Sunderland	United Kingdom	For J. Shepherd & James Shepherd.
Unknown date	Sparkler	Full-rigged ship	John T. Alcock	Sunderland	United Kingdom	For Young & Co.
Unknown date	Sparkling Dew	Merchantman	J. Lister	Sunderland	United Kingdom	For Beynon & Co.
Unknown date	Staffa	Barque	J. Barkes	Sunderland	United Kingdom	For W. Watson.
Unknown date	Stamboul	Steamship	White	Cowes	United Kingdom	For private owner.
Unknown date	Stanley	Merchantman	G. & J. Mills	Sunderland	United Kingdom	For Wilson Bros.
Unknown date	Star of Ceylon	Merchantman	William Pickersgill	Sunderland	United Kingdom	For Maule & Co.
Unknown date	Star of the Mersey	Merchantman	J. & J. Gibbon	Hylton	United Kingdom	For private owner.
Unknown date	Sunnyside	Snow	William Briggs & Son	Sunderland	United Kingdom	For J. Wood.
Unknown date	Susan Pardew	Barque	J. Hardie	Sunderland	United Kingdom	For Ellis & Co.
Unknown date	Syracuse	Merchantman	James Robinson	Sunderland	United Kingdom	For Mears & Co.
Unknown date	Syren	Paddle steamer		Greenwich	United Kingdom	For Charleston Importing and Exporting Company.
Unknown date	Tamar	Troopship	Samuda Brothers	Poplar	United Kingdom	For Royal Navy.
Unknown date	Thomas S. Stowe	Merchantman	T. R. Oswald	Sunderland	United Kingdom	For Hargrove & Co.
Unknown date	Texas	Corvette		Clydebank	United Kingdom	For confederate States Navy.
Unknown date	Tonawanda	Steamship		Philadelphia, Pennsylvania	United States	For private owner.
Unknown date	Trevanion	Merchantman	J. H. Watson	Sunderland	United Kingdom	For Barrass & Co.
Unknown date	Trevelyan	Full-rigged ship	W. Pile	Sunderland	United Kingdom	For J. Tyser.
Unknown date	Tulip	Steamship	James C. Jewett & Co.		United States	For private owner.
Unknown date	Tycoon	Merchantman	J. Robinson	Sunderland	United Kingdom	For Mr. Marwood.
Unknown date	Unison	Merchantman	Reay & Naisby	Sunderland	United Kingdom	For Farrow & Co.
Unknown date	Unity	Brigantine	L. Wheatley	Sunderland	United Kingdom	For Farrow & Co.
Unknown date	Verbena	Tug	Lawrence & Foulks	New York	United States	For R. S. Campbell.
Unknown date	Vicksburg	Steamship		Mystic, Connecticut	United States	For private owner.
Unknown date	Victor	Paddle tug		Middlesbrough-on-Tees	United Kingdom	For private owner.
Unknown date	Waterhen	Snow	J. Lister	North Hylton	United Kingdom	For Dodds & Co.
Unknown date	Waverley	Clipper			United Kingdom	For Passengers' Line.
Unknown date	Westborough	Merchantman	G. Short	Sunderland	United Kingdom	For Fowler & Co.
Unknown date	Widgeon	Merchantman	Gray & Young	Sunderland	United Kingdom	For J. Popplewell.
Unknown date	Wild Rose	Merchantman	B. & J. Gardner	Sunderland	United Kingdom	For J. Barry.
Unknown date	Willett Rowe	Paddle steamer		Brooklyn, New York	United States	For C. W. Copeland.
Unknown date	William and Maria	Humber Keel			United Kingdom	For William G. England.
Unknown date	Winlow	Barque	Robert Thompson Jr.	Sunderland	United Kingdom	For Hudson & Co.
Unknown date	Wo Kee	Merchantman	James Laing	Sunderland	United Kingdom	For Duncan & Co.
Unknown date	Wye	Merchantman	J. Blumer	Sunderland	United Kingdom	For R. Gayner.
Unknown date	Zealous	Merchantman	B. & J. Gardner	Sunderland	United Kingdom	For J. Westoll.
Unknown date	Zitella	Barque	A. Simey	Sunderland	United Kingdom	For Glynn & Sons.
Unknown date	Zouave	Tug		Newburgh, New York	United States	For New York and Glen Cove Steam Navigation Co,
