= USS Pink =

Gunboat of the United States Navy

History

United States
- Ordered: as Zouave
- Launched: 1863
- Acquired: 14 December 1863
- Commissioned: 6 February 1864
- Fate: Sank, 22 September 1865

General characteristics
- Displacement: 184 tons
- Length: 110 ft 4 in (33.63 m)
- Beam: 24 ft 6 in (7.47 m)
- Depth of hold: 7 ft (2.1 m)
- Propulsion: steam engine; screw-propelled
- Complement: 24
- Armament: one 30-pounder Parrott rifle; two heavy 12-pounder smoothbores

USS Pink was a steamer commissioned by the Union Navy during the American Civil War. She served the Union Navy's struggle against the Confederate States of America in various ways: as a tugboat, a gunboat, and as a small (184 ton) transport.

== Service history ==
Pink, a wooden screw tug built in 1863 as Zouave at Newburgh, New York, was purchased by the Union Navy 14 December 1863 from New York and Glen Cove Steam Navigation Co.; and commissioned 6 February 1864. The new tug sailed for the gulf early in April 1864 but was detained in the North Atlantic Blockading Squadron during the spring and early summer for repairs at Norfolk, Virginia, and service as a small transport on the James River.

She resumed her voyage south with sister tugs USS Tritonia, Athenia, and USS Rose 26 July and joined the West Gulf Blockading Squadron in Mississippi Sound on 5 August, the day of Admiral David Farragut's great victory in Mobile Bay. She supported Union operations, primarily in Mobile Bay, until after the end of the Civil War. While steaming from New Orleans, Louisiana, toward Mobile, Alabama, Pink ran aground on Dauphin Island before dawn 22 September 1865 and bilged beyond salvage.
