= USS Arkansas (1863) =

Cargo ship of the United States Navy

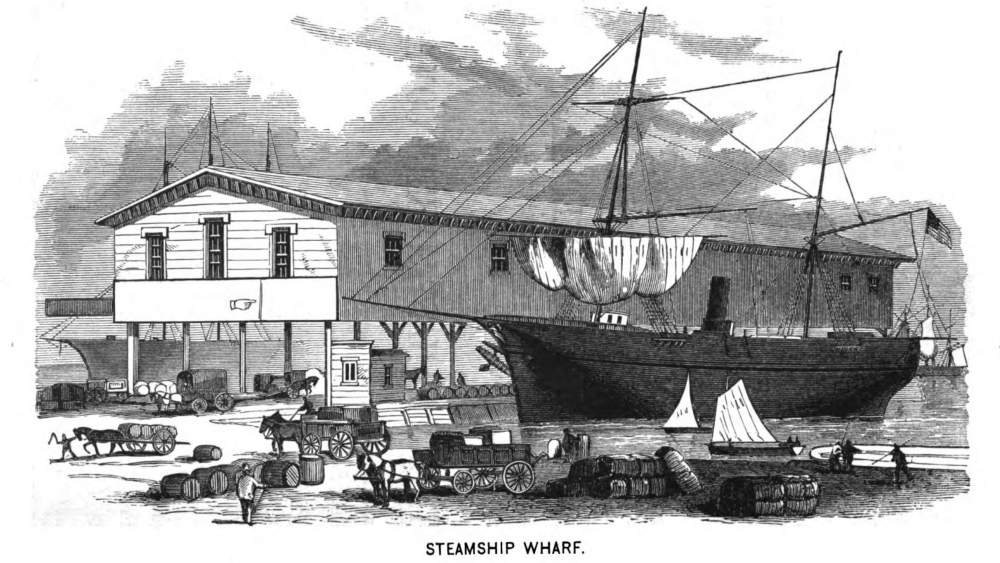
- 1866 depiction of a steamboat at a wharf, which may depict Arkansas as a civilian vessel

History

United States
- Builder: C. H. & W. H. Cramp
- Completed: 1863
- Acquired: 27 June 1863
- Commissioned: 29 June 1863 or 5 September 1863
- Decommissioned: 30 June 1865
- Fate: Sold, 20 July 1865 and then wrecked, 27 March 1866 or 28 March 1866

General characteristics
- Tons burthen: 752
- Length: 191 ft (58 m)
- Beam: 30 ft (9.1 m)
- Draft: 14 ft (4.3 m)
- Depth of hold: 19 ft (5.8 m)
- Propulsion: screw steamer; barkentine-rigged
- Speed: 15 knots
- Complement: 88
- Armament: one 12-pounder rifle; four 32-pounder smoothbores

USS Arkansas was a screw steamer acquired by the Union Navy during the American Civil War. Built by the C. H. & W. H. Cramp yard at Philadelphia, Pennsylvania, in 1863, as the civilian vessel Tonawanda, she was acquired by the navy on 27 June 1863 and renamed Arkansas. After being commissioned, the vessel was assigned to the West Gulf Blockading Squadron as a supply and communications vessel for the Union blockade in the Gulf of Mexico. Arkansas took the schooner Watchful as a prize on 27 September 1864, after weapons were found beneath the schooner's cargo, but the seizure was later declared unlawful by the court system. Decommissioned on 30 June 1865 and sold on 20 July, Arkansas was renamed back to Tonawanda and was used by the Philadelphia & Southern Mail Steamship Co. On a run between Boston, Massachusetts, and Havana in March 1866, Tonawanda ran aground and could not be freed; the ship was later salvaged.

== Acquisition and characteristics ==
The commercial screw steamer Tonawanda was built at Philadelphia, Pennsylvania, in 1863 by the C. H. & W. H. Cramp yard, and was originally based out of that city. The vessel was 191 feet (58 m) with a beam of 30 feet (9.1 m) and a depth of hold of 19 feet (5.8 m), to go with a draft of 14 feet (4.3 m). Tonawanda measured 752 tons burthen. She had a wooden hull and in addition to her steam power had a barkentine sailing rig. The screw was driven by a single steam engine which could operate as either a high-pressure or low-pressure engine. The engine had a stroke of 30 inches (76 cm) and a cylinder diameter of 40 inches (100 cm). The vessel had an average speed of 8 knots (15 km/h; 9.2 mph) and a maximum of 15 knots (28 km/h; 17 mph). With the American Civil War ongoing, the Union Navy purchased Tonawanda on 27 June 1863, under the authority of Commodore Cornelius Stribling, from S. & J. M. Flanagan for $98,000. (Note: Equivalent to $1,955,000 in 2024.) The ship was commissioned at the Philadelphia Navy Yard. The Dictionary of American Naval Fighting Ships states that this commissioning occurred on 29 June 1863, while the Encyclopedia of Arkansas and the naval historian Paul H. Silverstone state that this occurred on 5 September. In military service, she had a crew of 88. Tonawanda was renamed to Arkansas in navy service; Robert Patrick Bender, writing for the Encyclopedia of Arkansas, believes this naming reflects a belief that Arkansas secession was not valid. Arkansas had a variable armament during her service – it was four 32-pounder smoothbores and a 12-pounder rifled cannon on 4 September 1863, by 9 October 1863 a 20-pounder rifled cannon had been added, and by 21 June 1865 a 20-pounder Parrott rifle had been added as well.

== West Gulf Blockading Squadron ==
Under the command of Acting Volunteer Lieutenant William H. West, Arkansas was assigned to the West Gulf Blockading Squadron, to which she reported on 10 October 1863. Arkansas made supply runs to the various warships which comprised the Union blockade along the Texas coast and also maintained communications. She was one of several screw steamers which replaced the steamers USS Rhode Island and USS Connecticut on supply duty to enable the latter vessels to perform other duties. Arkansas alternated with USS Augusta Dinsmore on supply runs to Brownsville, Texas.

Arkansas, by then under the command of Acting Volunteer Lieutenant David Cate, met the schooner Watchful with a cargo of lumber and petroleum in the Gulf of Mexico on 27 September 1864. The master of the civilian vessel claimed that his ship was on a course between New York City and Matamoras, Mexico, and that the Watchful had stopped at New Orleans, Louisiana, for repairs. However, a cache of weapons was found under the lumber, and Cate had Watchful seized as a prize and taken to New Orleans. The New Orleans district court disallowed the prize claim, as the weapons in question were owned by a United States citizen and were intended for the use of the followers of Benito Juárez in an ongoing conflict in Mexico, to which the United States was a neutral party. The case made its way to the United States Supreme Court, who also ruled against the seizure.

== Postwar fate ==
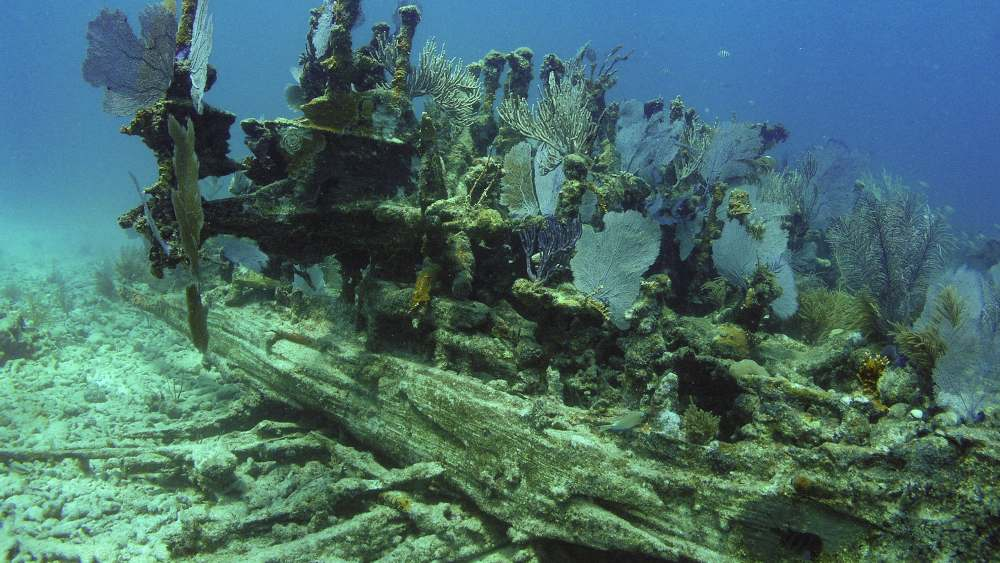
Wreck of Tonawanda at Elbow Reef

With the Confederate States of America having been defeated in the Civil War, Arkansas left New Orleans for Portsmouth, New Hampshire, on 5 June 1865. Decommissioned on 30 June, she was then sold at auction on 20 July to one George S. Leach, for $40,100. (Note: Equivalent to $642,000 in 2024.) On 1 August, Arkansas was redocumented as Tonawanda. Used by the Philadelphia & Southern Mail Steamship Co., Tonawanda began making trading runs between Boston, Massachusetts, and Havana. On one such run under Captain John Berry, while carrying a cargo of fish and potatoes to Havana, Tonawanda ran aground on the Elbow Reef. After attempts to free the vessel failed, it was salvaged by wrecking crews. The Florida Keys National Marine Sanctuary states that the grounding occurred on 27 March 1866, with Berry turning over Tonawanda to the wreckers after two days of trying to free her, while the Dictionary of American Naval Fighting Ships and the Encyclopedia of Arkansas state that the wreck occurred on 28 March. Wooden and metal remains from the wreck remain on the ocean floor.

== Sources ==
- Browning, Robert M. (2015). Lincoln's Trident: The West Gulf Blockading Squadron During the Civil War. Tuscaloosa, Alabama: University of Alabama Press. ISBN 978-0-8173-1846-8.
- Lytle, William M. (1952). Merchant Steam Vessels of the United States 1807–1868. Mystic, Connecticut: The Steamship Historical Society of America. OCLC 7195533.
- Silverstone, Paul H. (1989). Warships of the Civil War Navies. Annapolis, Maryland: Naval Institute Press. ISBN 0-87021-783-6.
