= USS Avenger (1863) =

Gunboat of the United States Navy

History

United States
- Laid down: date unknown
- Launched: 1863
- Acquired: 7 December 1863
- Commissioned: 29 February 1864
- Decommissioned: 1 August 1865
- Fate: Sold, 29 November 1865

General characteristics
- Displacement: 410 tons
- Length: 210 ft 0 in (64.01 m)
- Beam: 40 ft 0 in (12.19 m)
- Draught: 6 ft 0 in (1.83 m)
- Propulsion: steam engine; side wheel-propelled
- Speed: 12 mph
- Complement: not known
- Armament: mounted ram; one 100-pounder Parrott rifle; one 12-pounder Parrott rifle; four 24-pounder smoothbores

USS Avenger was a large steamer with powerful guns acquired by the Union Navy during the American Civil War. She was used by the Union Navy as a gunboat in support of the Union Navy blockade of Confederate waterways. Because of her large size, she was also used, at times, as a cargo ship.

== Avenger, a ram built at New Albany, Indiana ==
On 7 December 1863, the U.S. War Department transferred to the Navy two wooden-hulled, side-wheel rams then being built at New Albany, Indiana, for the Army's Mississippi Marine Brigade. On that day, as he was reporting having taken possession of these still-unfinished vessels, Rear Admiral David Dixon Porter—who then commanded the Mississippi Squadron—suggested that they be named Avenger and Vindicator.

== Assigned to the Mississippi River Squadron ==
On 19 December, the larger ship, Avenger, was assigned to the squadron's Third District which was responsible for controlling the Mississippi River between Natchez, Mississippi and the mouth of the Red River. Completed late in February 1864, this ram dropped down the Ohio River and was commissioned at Cairo, Illinois, on the 29th of that month, Acting Volunteer Lt. Charles A. Wright in command.

=== Participating in the Red River Campaign ===
On 12 March, Avenger—carrying dispatches and a cargo of ordnance stores—headed downstream to join a powerful naval force which Porter had recently led up the Red River to cooperate with Union Army troops then pushing through Louisiana in a generally northwesterly direction toward Shreveport, Louisiana. The major objectives of the Red River campaign were: the establishment of a Union foothold in Texas to weaken Confederate strength west of the Mississippi River, the impeding of French interventionism in Mexico, and the acquisition of cotton for idle textile mills in the North.

=== Damaged in a Mississippi River collision ===
However, when Avenger reached a point only some six miles below Cairo, Illinois, she encountered an upward-bound merchant steamer whose pilot attempted to pass her on the wrong side of the stream. The two vessels collided, and Avenger suffered considerable damage to her starboard side. Although she was able to continue on down the Mississippi River, the ram lost nearly a day at Memphis, Tennessee, undergoing repairs. Her trip downriver also revealed defects in her machinery which slowed her progress, but she finally reached the mouth of the Red River on the 16th. There, orders from Porter awaited which directed her to return North with messages. After coaling, she got underway on the 17th and arrived back at Cairo on the 23d.

There, Wright's report of her engineering difficulties resulted in a survey of the ship. The inspectors recommended that a set of blowers be installed to increase the efficiency of her boilers. While this work was being performed by the repair ship Samson, it was discovered that the ship's port boilers were badly burned and required repairs.

=== Successful Ouachita River expedition ===
After temporary remedies were made, Avenger entered the Red River on 2 April carrying messages upstream. Two days later, she took station at the mouth of the Black River and, on the 7th, she entered the Ouachita River in an expedition commanded by Lt. Comdr. James P. Foster in the side-wheel ram Lafayette. The Union warships ascended that tributary as high as Ouachita City and confiscated some 3,000 bales of cotton; liberated 800 negroes; and burned the courthouse at Monroe, Louisiana, the railroad depot there, and a bridge over the stream.

=== Bedford attacks Fort Pillow ===
They stood down the Ouachita River on the 12th and returned to the Mississippi River when they learned that the famous Confederate cavalry commander, Major General Nathan Bedford Forrest, had attacked Fort Pillow, Tennessee.

Foster, accompanied by Avenger and Choctaw, ascended the Mississippi River to check Forrest. However, at Memphis he learned that, after pillaging Fort Pillow, the dreaded Southern raider had abandoned the fallen Union stronghold and retired inland. Therefore, Avenger—which had been suffering engine trouble—was free to remain at Memphis for repairs which lasted through the end of April.

=== Hauling coast near the mouth of the Red River ===
The ram then returned to the mouth of the Red River where she was assigned to guard the coaling barge stationed there. She was relieved by Nymph on 3 May and proceeded to the mouth of the Black River with additional coal barges in tow. There she was again relieved and steamed upriver to join Forest Rose on patrol in the vicinity of Fort deRussy. At that fort, Avenger exchanged shots with Southern sharpshooters on 12 May; and she and her consort engaged the enemy several times as they continued patrols up and down the river during the next five days.

=== General Nathaniel P. Banks carried to New Orleans ===
The ram returned to the mouth of the Red River on 17 May to coal and then continued downriver to Simmesport, Louisiana, to embark Major General Nathaniel P. Banks, the commander of the Army forces involved in the Red River expedition, for passage to New Orleans, Louisiana. The advance of his troops had been checked at the Battle of Pleasant Hill and a shortage of ammunition, supplies, and water had forced him to withdraw.

=== Reassigned to blockade duty ===
In May, Avenger was stationed at Morganza, Louisiana, and carried out blockading duties between Morganza and Donaldsonville, Louisiana through November, when she was ordered to help in patrolling the Mississippi River between Vicksburg and Natchez, Mississippi.

=== Mississippi River operations ===
On 21 November 1864, after spotting a skiff crossing the river at Bruinsburg, Mississippi, Avenger shelled the area and sent a landing party ashore which found contraband concealed in the undergrowth. The landing party captured several Confederate soldiers and confiscated 154 rifles with bayonets, and several skiffs and wagons.

She continued to operate in the Mississippi River and, in March 1865, was stationed off Cole's Creek to prevent Confederate troops and supplies from crossing the river. The patrols were intensified in late April and early May in the effort to capture Jefferson Davis, who was believed to be attempting to escape across the Mississippi river. After the President of the defeated Confederacy was captured in Georgia on 10 May, the naval forces employed in blockade duties were gradually reduced.

== Post-war decommissioning, sale, and subsequent commercial career ==
In July 1865, Avenger was sent to Mound City, Illinois, where she was decommissioned on 1 August. Sold at public auction there on 29 November 1865 to Cutting & Ellis, the former ram was documented as Balize on 16 April 1867 and began service out of New Orleans as a merchantman. The steamer continued commercial operations until 1871.
