= USS Stockdale (1863) =

Gunboat of the United States Navy

History

United States
- Ordered: as J. T. Stockdale
- Laid down: date unknown
- Launched: 1863
- Acquired: 13 November 1863
- Commissioned: 26 December 1863
- Decommissioned: 24 August 1865
- Stricken: 1865 (est.)
- Home port: New Orleans, Louisiana
- Fate: Sold, 24 August 1865

General characteristics
- Displacement: 188 tons
- Length: not known
- Beam: not known
- Draught: not known
- Propulsion: steam engine; side wheel-propelled
- Speed: not known
- Complement: 63
- Armament: two 30-pounder Parrott rifles; four 24-pounders howitzers
- Armour: tinclad

USS Stockdale was a steamer commissioned by the Union Navy during the American Civil War.

She served the Union Navy during her struggle against the Confederate States of America, both as a tugboat as well as a gunboat when the occasion demanded.

== Built in West Brownsville, Pennsylvania, in 1863 ==
Stockdale – a wooden, side-wheel steamer built in 1863 at West Brownsville, Pennsylvania – was purchased by the Navy on 13 November 1863 at Cincinnati, Ohio, from B. T. Laughlin, et al., under the name J. T. Stockdale, and commissioned at Cairo, Illinois, on 26 December 1863.

== Civil War operations ==
=== Assigned to the West Gulf Blockade ===
Renamed Stockdale sometime before 19 January 1864 and designated Tinclad No. 42, the gunboat steamed down the Mississippi River and joined the West Gulf Blockading Squadron at New Orleans, Louisiana, on 3 January 1864.

=== Defending New Orleans from recapture ===
Since rumors were then circulating that Confederate ironclads were about to attempt to recapture New Orleans, Stockdale steamed down the Mississippi River to reinforce Admiral David Farragut's ships in defending that strategic city, and she served in the West Gulf Blockading Squadron through the end of the Civil War. Most of her service was performed in Berwick Bay, Lake Pontchartrain, and other inland waters along the gulf coast.

=== Under attack by Confederate cavalry ===
On 16 May 1864, a landing party from the tinclad gunboat was fired upon by Confederate cavalry at the mouth of the Tohefuncta River. Two officers were captured and one killed before the attackers were forced to withdraw.

=== The Battle of Mobile Bay ===
The ship was ordered to Mississippi Sound on 23 July to prepare for the impending attack on Mobile Bay. On the morning of 2 August, she anchored off Petit Bois Island. The next day, she steamed to Dauphin Island where all of her boats were used to land troops from Union Army transports.

On the morning of the 5th, while David Farragut was leading his squadron into Mobile Bay, Stockdale steamed toward Fort Powell and bombarded that Southern fortress.

In the months that followed, Stockdale continued to serve in the West Gulf Blockading Squadron for the most part, and supported mop-up operations in and around Mobile Bay.

=== Destroying a valuable Confederate salt works ===
On 8 September, she joined USS Tritonia, USS Rodolph, and an Army transport for an expedition to Salt House Point, Mississippi, to destroy extensive Southern salt works. Only Stockdale and Rodolph crossed the bar and entered the Bon Secours River.

The salt works were so extensive that boat crews from the two ships worked all day and into the following afternoon before finishing the destruction.

=== Destroying a sawmill and 60,000 board feet (100 m^{3}) of lumber ===
On the 11th, Stockdale again joined Randolph in an expedition—this time up the Fish River to seize a sawmill engine, some livestock, and 60,000 board feet (100 m^{3}) of lumber. Confederate riflemen fired upon the retiring ships and felled trees ahead of them, but the Union ships broke through the obstructions to safety.

=== The capture of blockade runner Medora ===
On 8 December, Stockdale and USS John P. Jackson captured schooner Medora in Mississippi Sound as the blockade runner was attempting to slip to sea laden with cotton.

Stockdale continued to perform various duties into 1865. On 8 March, she began support of active operations against Mobile, Alabama, and she continued the duty until the city surrendered on 12 April.

== Post-war decommissioning and disposal ==
After the Civil War ended, Stockdale continued to operate in the Gulf of Mexico until she was decommissioned on 24 August 1865 at New Orleans. She was sold at public auction there on the same day.

== Note ==
Lytle classifies this ship as a stern wheel steamer in his Merchant Steam Vessels of the United States 1807-1868, p. 94.
