= USS Gazelle (1863) =

Gunboat of the United States Navy

History

United States
- Ordered: as Emma Brown
- Laid down: 1863
- Launched: 1863
- Acquired: 21 November 1863
- Commissioned: February 1864
- Decommissioned: 7 July 1865
- Stricken: date unknown
- Fate: Sold 17 August 1865

General characteristics
- Displacement: 117 tons
- Length: 135 ft (41 m)
- Beam: 23 ft (7.0 m)
- Draught: 4 ft (1.2 m)
- Propulsion: steam engine; side wheel-propelled
- Speed: 4 knots
- Complement: not known
- Armament: six 12-pounder rifles

USS Gazelle was a side-wheel steamer acquired by the Union Navy for duty with the Mississippi River Squadron.

== Commissioned at Cairo, Illinois, in 1864 ==
She was the first ship to be named Gazelle by the Navy after being purchased at Cincinnati, Ohio, 21 November 1863, as the Emma Brown. She was commissioned February 1864 at Cairo, Illinois., with Acting Master Charles Thatcher in command.

== Civil War operations ==
Gazelle reached the mouth of the Red River in time to join Admiral David Dixon Porter’s joint Army-Navy expedition of 12 March-22 May 1864. The operation was part of the campaign against Texas designed to gain a strong foothold there and to thwart the French intervention in Mexico.

Serving between the mouth of the Red River and Grand Ecore, Louisiana, Gazelle engaged enemy shore units, convoyed Union Army transports, and patrolled the river while Union Navy gunboats assisted in the capture of Fort De Russy.

For the next year the ship patrolled between the mouth of the Red River and Morganza, Louisiana, and convoyed transports. On 24 May 1865 she embarked Confederate Generals Simon Bolivar Buckner, Sr., and Sterling Price at the mouth of the Red River and brought them to Baton Rouge, Louisiana, to negotiate a surrender with General Edward Canby. Subsequently, following repairs at New Orleans, Louisiana, Gazelle steamed upriver to Mound City, Illinois., arriving 25 June.

== Decommissioning ==
She decommissioned there 7 July 1865; she was sold 17 August 1865 to Henry Scott et al. She was redocumented as Plain City 23 October and operated until abandoned in 1869.
