= USS Tallahatchie =

Gunboat of the United States Navy

History

United States
- Laid down: date unknown
- Launched: in 1863 at Cincinnati, Ohio
- Acquired: 23 January 1864; at Cincinnati, Ohio
- Commissioned: circa 9 March 1864; at New Orleans, Louisiana
- Decommissioned: 21 July 1865 at Mobile, Alabama
- Stricken: 1865 (est.)
- Fate: Sold, 12 August 1865

General characteristics
- Displacement: 171 tons
- Length: not known
- Beam: not known
- Draught: not known
- Propulsion: steam engine; side wheel-propelled
- Speed: not known
- Complement: 51
- Armament: two 32-pounder guns; four 24-pounder howitzers
- Armour: tinclad

USS Tallahatchie was a 171-ton steamer acquired by the Union Navy during the American Civil War for service against the Confederate States of America.

Tallahatchie was outfitted with ordnance for river bank operations (howitzers) and guns for attacking blockade runners (32-pounders) and was sent to the Mississippi River and then to the Gulf of Mexico coast, where she participated in operations in both places.

== Built in Cincinnati, Ohio, in 1863 ==
Cricket No. 4—a wooden-hulled sidewheel steamer built in 1863 at Cincinnati, Ohio—was purchased there by the Union Navy from Stephen Morse et al. on 23 January 1864. Renamed Tallahatchie on 26 January and designated "tinclad gunboat no. 46," the sidewheeler was held at Cincinnati for a fortnight by ice in the Ohio River before she could be moved downstream to Cairo, Illinois, to be fitted out and lightly armored.

== Civil War operations ==
=== Assigned to the Mississippi River ===
Acquired by Rear Admiral David Dixon Porter in response to a request from Commodore Henry H. Bell for light draft gunboats to strengthen United States naval forces in the Gulf of Mexico, Tallahatchie headed down the Mississippi River on 9 March 1864. The ship's bottom was covered with sheet copper at New Orleans, Louisiana, to protect it during salt water operations. When finally ready for action, the ship was commissioned at New Orleans, Acting Master J. W. Saunders in command.

Meanwhile, Porter's Mississippi Squadron had ascended the Red River to support a Union Army thrust toward Texas. However, the forces had met reverses and were retiring. This left the Union gunboats without land support and in danger of being caught upstream by the falling water level in the river. Now Porter needed help, and Tallahatchie ascended the Mississippi and entered the Red River which she patrolled from Fort De Russy to the mouth of the Black River to protect the Mississippi Squadron's waterborne communications.

=== Assigned to the West Gulf blockade ===
In the meantime, the crews of Porter's warships and Union Army engineers dammed the river to allow the ships to ride downstream over the rapids. When the Union gunboats reached safety, Tallahatchie returned to New Orleans for duty with the West Gulf Blockading Squadron. She served with this force for the duration of hostilities, operating off the passes of the Mississippi and in Mississippi Sound and Lake Pontchartrain.

On 15 September 1864, while Tallahatchie was operating on the lake, her commanding officer, Acting Master J. W. Lennekin, received information warning him that smugglers would attempt to bring out contraband cotton under cover of darkness. Accordingly, he stationed a picket boat off the mouth of the Blind River.

=== Apprehending smugglers ===
That evening, when the smugglers came out, Tallahatchie's pickets challenged them and ordered them to surrender. Facing imminent capture, the southerners threw overboard a ledger book which contained the details of their illicit activities. Much to the smugglers' chagrin, the book was recovered.

Two days later at the mouth of the Amite River, Tallahatchie captured more contraband cotton as well as small quantities of medicines, powder, flour, and other supplies on the banks of Bayou Schinblon. Besides taking the contraband, her landing party went ashore and learned that Confederate agents had previously purchased ammunition and supplies in the vicinity.

== Post-war decommissioning ==
After the coming of peace in the spring of 1865, Tallahatchie was decommissioned at Mobile Bay, Alabama, on 21 July 1865. Sold at auction to S. W. Roberts on 12 August, the sidewheeler was redocumented as Coosa on 25 August. She was subsequently destroyed by fire at Licking River, Kentucky, on 7 July 1869.

== See also ==
- Anaconda Plan
