= USS Kenwood (1863) =

Gunboat of the United States Navy

History

United States
- Laid down: date unknown
- Launched: 3 April 1863
- Acquired: 24 May 1863
- Commissioned: 24 May 1863
- Decommissioned: 7 August 1865
- Stricken: 1865 (est.)
- Fate: Sold, 17 August 1865

General characteristics
- Displacement: 232 tons
- Length: not known
- Beam: not known
- Draft: 5 ft 6 in (1.68 m)
- Propulsion: steam engine; stern wheel-propelled
- Speed: 7 knots
- Complement: not known
- Armament: two 32-pounder guns; four 24-pounder howitzers

USS Kenwood was a steamer acquired by the Union Navy during the American Civil War. She was used by the Union Navy as a gunboat in support of the Union Navy blockade of Confederate waterways.

Kenwood, a stern wheel steamer was launched 3 April 1863, by H. A. Jones at Cincinnati, Ohio; purchased for the Navy by Rear Admiral David Dixon Porter and commissioned at Cairo, Illinois, 24 May 1863, Acting Master John Swaney in command.

Kenwood joined the Mississippi River squadron, 1 June 1863, and operated on the Arkansas River in the vicinity of Fort Pillow. Following brief river convoy duty, Kenwood participated in the joint Army-Navy expedition which captured Yazoo City, Mississippi, 13 July 1863. Kenwood was sent to the Port Hudson, Louisiana, Division, 19 August 1863 and served as a convoy and patrol gunboat at Baton Rouge, Louisiana, until 10 February 1865, when she was ordered to the 4th River District at Natchez.

After helping to neutralize Rebel forces west of the Mississippi, Kenwood was sent 28 May 1865 to New Orleans, Louisiana, as a transport for officers. Following this duty, she steamed to Mound City, Illinois, and decommissioned 7 August 1865. Kenwood was sold at Mound City to W. J. Priest 17 August 1865. After merchant service, as Cumberland, she exploded and sank at Shawneetown, Illinois, 14 August 1869 with the loss of 18 lives.
