= USS Meteor (1863) =

Gunboat of the United States Navy

History

United States
- Ordered: as Tinclad No. 44 (Scioto)
- Laid down: date unknown
- Launched: 1863
- Acquired: December 1863
- Commissioned: 8 March 1864
- Decommissioned: 12 September 1865
- Stricken: c1865
- Fate: Sold, 5 October 1865

General characteristics
- Displacement: 221 tons
- Length: 156 ft (48 m)
- Beam: 33 ft 6 in (10.21 m)
- Draft: 4 ft 3 in (1.30 m)
- Propulsion: steam engine, side wheel
- Speed: not known
- Complement: not known
- Armament: two 32 pounder (rifled) gun, two 24 pounder (smooth bore) guns
- Armor: tin

USS Meteor was a gunboat acquired by the Union Navy during the American Civil War. She carried heavy artillery and became part of the sea blockade of waterways of the breakaway Confederate States of America.

The second ship to be named Meteor by the Union Navy, Tinclad No. 44, an armored wooden side wheel gunboat, was built as Scioto at Cincinnati, Ohio, in 1863; acquired by the Navy there in late December 1863; renamed Meteor on the 21st; formally purchased from Washington Houshell 23 January 1864; and commissioned at New Orleans, Louisiana, 8 March 1864, Acting Master Meletiah Jordan in command.

== Assigned to the West Gulf Blockading Squadron ==
Assigned to the West Gulf Blockading Squadron, Meteor departed New Orleans 26 March 1864 to take up station as guard vessel between Head of Passes and Pass a l’Outre on the Mississippi River, continuing on this duty in addition to providing support for ground troops in skirmishes at the mouth of the Red River and operating off Port Hudson, Louisiana, until 10 February 1865 when she sailed for Mobile Bay.

== Mobile Bay operations ==
Arriving Navy Cove the next day, the steamer stood up Mobile Bay, 11 March, to Dog River Bar with other ships of the squadron, and opened fire in support of operations, under Rear Adm. Henry K. Thatcher and Maj. Gen. Edward R. S. Canby, against Mobile, Alabama. On 19 March she steamed to Fort Haines to embark troops and on the 21st and 22d landed them under cover of gunboats on the right bank of the Fish River 17 miles above Mobile Bay.

== Bombardment of Spanish Fort ==
Meteor remained in the Fish River until 2 April and then stood down to join in the bombardment of the Spanish Fort 8 to 11 April, forcing the upper batteries to be evacuated and allowing an assault to be carried out on the fort on the 12th. The steamer then moved down river on the 20th into the Bay and for the next 4 months conducted salvage operations on monitor Osage, sunk by a torpedo (mine) 29 March 1865 off the Blakeley River. Osage was raised 18 August and towed to Mobile City; Meteor then proceeded to Lakeport, Alabama, 29 August. On 9 September, her crew transferred to supply ship USS Fearnot (1861).

== Decommissioning ==
Meteor then decommissioned on the 12th. She was sold at public auction at New Orleans 5 October 1865 to Mitchell, Boardman, and Walden, and renamed De Soto two days later for merchant service in the river.
