= USS Glide (1863) =

Gunboat of the United States Navy

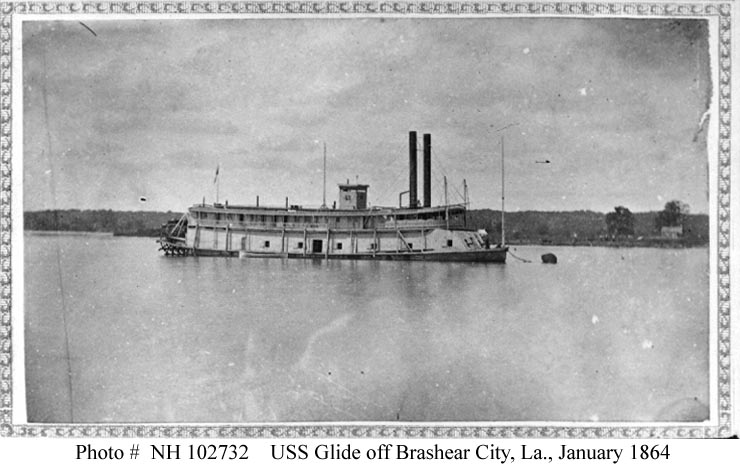
- USS Glide in 1864

History

United States
- Launched: 1863
- Acquired: 1863
- Commissioned: November 1863
- Decommissioned: August 1865
- Fate: Sunk, January 1869

General characteristics
- Displacement: 232 tons
- Length: 160 ft (49 m)
- Propulsion: Steam
- Armament: 6 guns

The second USS Glide was a sternwheel tinclad gunboat in the United States Navy during the American Civil War. It was used in the battles of Mississippi Squadron and Arkansas Post.

Originally built in Murraysville, Virginia in 1863, was purchased by the Navy the same year. She was converted to a "tinclad" gunboat No. 43 USS Glide. From early 1864 until the end of the war she was assigned to blockading duties in Berwick Bay, Louisiana. She was decommissioned and sold in August 1865, then she served in commercial service as Glide. She was destroyed by a boiler explosion in January 1869.
