= USS Buckthorn (1863) =

Tender of the United States Navy

History

United States
- Ordered: as Signal
- Laid down: date unknown
- Launched: 1863
- Acquired: December 22, 1863
- Commissioned: April 7, 1864
- Decommissioned: 1868
- Stricken: 1868 (est.)
- Homeport: Pensacola Navy Yard
- Fate: Sold, September 7, 1869

General characteristics
- Displacement: 128 tons
- Length: 87 ft (27 m)
- Beam: 22 ft (6.7 m)
- Depth of hold: 7 ft 7 in (2.31 m)
- Propulsion: steam engine; screw-propelled
- Speed: 8.5 knots
- Armament: one 30-pounder gun; two 12-pounder smoothbores

USS Buckthorn was a steamship acquired by the Union Navy during the American Civil War. She was used as a fleet tender and dispatch vessel in support of the Union Navy blockade along Confederate coastal waters.

== Service in the Navy ==
Buckthorn, was a wooden hull, screw steamer, 87 feet in length and outfitted with one mast. She was built in 1863 at East Haddam, Connecticut, as Signal; purchased by Rear Admiral Gregory for the Navy from George W. Jewett for the sum of $26,500 on December 22, 1863; and commissioned at New York City April 7, 1864, acting Volunteer Lieutenant W. Godfrey in Command. Buckthorn was a strongly built vessel and was well adapted for service as a tug. Buckthorn served on the Union side with the West Gulf Blockading Squadron during the American Civil War, and participated in the Battle of Mobile Bay (August 5, 1864). She acted as a tender for the fleet and was also used as a dispatch vessel throughout her career.

== Post-Civil War service ==
After the Civil War she served at Pensacola Navy Yard until laid up in 1868. After a brief service at Pensacola Buckthorn was sold for $3,000 at Pensacola, Florida, September 7, 1869.

== Bibliography ==
- Marsh, Captain C.C. (1921). Official records of the Union and Confederate navies in the war of the rebellion. Josephus Daniels, Secretary of the Navy. p. 252. Url
- Wyllie, Arthur (2007). The Union Navy. Lulu.com. p. 668. ISBN 978-1-4303-2117-0. Url1

== See also ==
- Union Navy
