= USS Oleander =

Union Civil War patrol boat

History

United States
- Laid down: date unknown
- Launched: 10 January 1863
- Acquired: 28 March 1863
- Commissioned: April 1863
- Decommissioned: 18 August 1865
- Stricken: 1865 (est.)
- Fate: Sold, 5 September 1865

General characteristics
- Displacement: 246 tons
- Length: 143 ft (44 m)
- Beam: 22 ft 6 in (6.86 m)
- Draft: 6 ft (1.8 m)
- Depth of hold: 8 ft (2.4 m)
- Propulsion: steam engine; side wheel-propelled
- Speed: 11 knots
- Complement: 35
- Armament: two 20-pounder Parrott rifles

USS Oleander was a steamer acquired by the Union Navy during the American Civil War. She was used by the Navy to patrol navigable waterways of the Confederacy to prevent the South from trading with other countries.

Oleander, a wooden, side-wheel steamer built at Keyport, New Jersey, was launched 10 January 1863; purchased by the Navy at New York City from James Howe and C. W. Copeland 28 March 1863; and commissioned in the following fortnight, as she joined the South Atlantic Blockading Squadron upon arriving at Port Royal, South Carolina, 11 April.

== Service history ==
Originally commanded by Acting Master Woodbury H. Polley, the steamer served in Union blockade of the Confederate coast operating along the coasts of South Carolina, Georgia, and Florida.

On 28 July 1863, with USS Beauregard and boats from USS Sagamore and USS Para, Oleander attacked New Smyrna, Florida, shelling the town and capturing a sloop loaded with cotton and ready to sail. They also caused Confederates to burn several other vessels to prevent capture and the Union force destroyed a number of buildings and large quantities of cotton ashore.

After the fighting stopped, Oleander decommissioned at New York City 18 August 1865, and was sold at auction there 5 September 1865 to Smith and Downing.
