= USS Snowdrop (1863) =

Gunboat of the United States Navy

History

United States
- Name: USS Snowdrop
- Laid down: 1863
- Acquired: by purchase, 16 October 1863
- Fate: Broken up, 1884

General characteristics
- Type: Tug
- Displacement: 125 long tons (127 t)
- Length: 91 ft (28 m)
- Beam: 17 ft 6 in (5.33 m)
- Draft: 8 ft (2.4 m)
- Depth of hold: 8 ft 6 in (2.59 m)
- Speed: 12 knots (22 km/h; 14 mph)
- Complement: 14
- Armament: 2 × guns

USS Snowdrop, originally named Albert DeGroat and occasionally referred to as A. DeGroat was a screw tug built in 1863 at Buffalo, New York. Albert DeGroat was purchased by the United States Navy at New York City on 16 October 1863; renamed Snowdrop; and was fitted out at the New York Navy Yard.

After service at New York into the spring of 1864, Snowdrop was assigned to the North Atlantic Blockading Squadron and ordered to Hampton Roads on 2 May. She served in the North Atlantic Blockading Squadron through the last two years of the American Civil War and apparently operated exclusively in the Hampton Roads area. After peace was restored, she remained at the Norfolk Navy Yard through the reconstruction years. She was ordered to New York sometime in the second half of 1883 and was broken up at the New York Navy Yard in 1884.

== See also ==
- Union Navy
