= USS Tritonia =

Union Navy steamer in the American Civil War

History

United States
- Ordered: as Sarah S. B. Gary
- Laid down: date unknown
- Launched: 1863
- Acquired: 1 December 1863
- Commissioned: 23 April 1864
- Decommissioned: circa October 1866
- Stricken: 1866 (est.)
- Home port: New Orleans, Louisiana
- Fate: Sold, 5 October 1866

General characteristics
- Displacement: 202 tons
- Length: 178 ft (54 m)
- Beam: 22 ft 4 in (6.81 m)
- Draught: not known
- Propulsion: steam engine; side wheel-propelled
- Speed: not known
- Complement: not known
- Armament: one heavy 12-pounder gun; one light 12-pounder gun

USS Tritonia was a 202-ton steamer commissioned by the Union Navy during the American Civil War.

She served the Union Navy's war against the Confederate States of America in a variety of ways: as a tugboat, a patrol gunboat, a dispatch boat, a salvage ship, a minesweeper, and as a small (202 ton) transport.

== Construction ==
Tritonia—a side-wheel steamer built as Sarah S. B. Gary in 1863 at East Haddam, Connecticut—was purchased by the Navy at Hartford, Connecticut, on 1 December 1863; and commissioned at the New York Navy Yard on 23 April 1864.

== Civil War operations ==
With USS Stepping Stones and USS Delaware, Tritonia served in a special torpedo and picket division established in the James River, Virginia, on 12 May 1864. The division patrolled the river to keep it clear of Confederate vessels, torpedoes (mines), and fire rafts.

On 26 July, Tritonia left the division for duty with the West Gulf Blockading Squadron. She arrived in Mississippi Sound on 5 August, the day of Admiral David Farragut's victory in Mobile Bay, and spent the remainder of the month operating as a dispatch vessel between New Orleans, Louisiana, and that historic body of water.

On 8 and 9 September, boat crews from Tritonia, USS Rodolph, USS Stockdale, and Army transport USS Planter destroyed several large Confederate salt works at Salt House Point in Bon Secours Bay, Alabama.

As they returned to Mobile Bay on 11 September, the vessels were fired upon but suffered no casualties.

Tritonia resumed blockade duty, towing the captured schooner Medora to New Orleans, Louisiana, on 15 December for adjudication. She then operated in Mobile Bay until the end of the war and later at Pensacola, Florida, and New Orleans, Louisiana.

== Post-war service ==
On 29 January 1866, Tritonia carried a company of United States Army troops up the Tombigbee River and recaptured the steamer Belfast which had been seized by guerrillas and taken up that stream. The joint expedition also recovered the steamer's cargo of cotton and captured five guerrillas as well.

== Decommissioning, sale and subsequent career ==
Tritonia was sold at public auction at New York City on 5 October 1866; redocumented as Belle Brown on 19 November; and lost at sea in 1880.
