= USS Benefit =

Ship

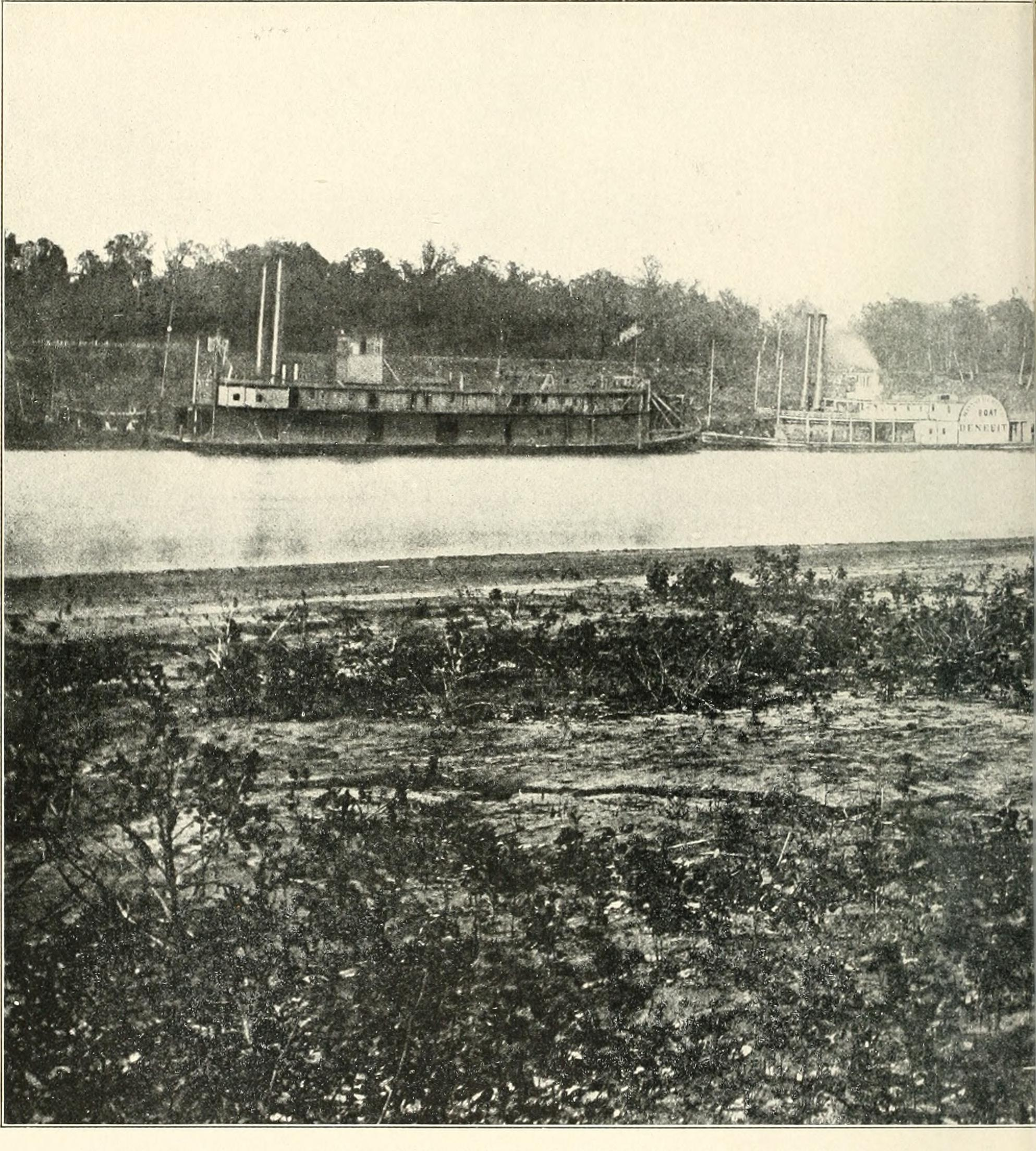
- USS Brown (left) and USS Benefit during the Red River Campaign, 1864

History

United States
- Laid down: date unknown
- Launched: 1863
- Acquired: 1863 or 1864
- In service: circa February 1864
- Out of service: circa May 1865
- Stricken: circa May 1865 (est.)
- Fate: returned to owner; Mr. Edward Buse

General characteristics
- Displacement: 213 tons
- Length: not known
- Beam: not known
- Draught: not known
- Propulsion: steam engine; side wheel-propelled
- Speed: not known
- Complement: not known
- Armament: not known

USS Benefit was a steamer acquired by the Union Navy during the American Civil War. She was used by the Union Navy as a tugboat and general transport in support of the Union Navy blockade of Confederate waterways.

== Steamer borrowed by the Union Navy for use on the Mississippi River ==
Benefit, a sidewheel steamer built at Metropolis, Illinois, in 1863, was temporarily acquired by the Union Navy sometime either late in that year or early in 1864 from Mr. Edward Buse for use of the Mississippi Squadron as a tug and general transport.

=== Manned by a civilian crew and a ship’s master designated by the owner ===
Manned by a civilian crew and commanded by an officer appointed by her owner, under the direction of Acting Master John D. Harty, the steamer began serving the Navy early in February 1864 if not before then. Her first documented mission began at noon on February 2 of that year when she departed Cairo, Illinois, and descended the Mississippi River with important dispatches for Rear Admiral David Dixon Porter.

=== Civilian master killed while bearing dispatches for Admiral Porter ===
The tug's most notable service occurred during the joint Army Navy expedition up the Red River in the spring of 1864. While engaged in this operation, she braved the fire of a four-gun battery some 50 miles above Grand Ecore, to carry information to the admiral. The civilian master of the tug was killed in the action, and Lt. Silas W. Terry took charge of the vessel so that she might complete her mission.

=== Continued service through the end of war ===
After Porter's Flotilla succeeded in withdrawing from the Red River, Benefit continued to serve on the Mississippi and its tributaries supporting the Mississippi Squadron until after the Confederacy collapsed in April 1865.

== Tug turned over to owner who returned it to service on the Mississippi ==
On April 9, 1865, the day of General Robert E. Lee’s surrender at Appomattox Court House, her commanding officer was ordered to turn all public property on board Benefit over to the naval station at Monnek City, Illinois; and, soon thereafter, she was returned to her owner. The tug resumed merchant service and continued to operate on the Mississippi River system until she was destroyed by fire on April 6, 1867, at Starks Landing, Alabama.
