= USS Fort Morgan =

Gunboat of the United States Navy

History

United States
- Laid down: date unknown
- Launched: 1863
- Acquired: 8 January 1864
- Commissioned: 5 February 1864
- Decommissioned: 22 August 1865
- Stricken: 1865 (est.)
- Fate: Sold, 5 September 1865

General characteristics
- Displacement: 1,249 tons
- Length: 220 ft (67 m)
- Beam: 34 ft 6 in (10.52 m)
- Draught: 10 ft 2 in (3.10 m)
- Propulsion: steam engine; screw-propelled
- Speed: not known
- Complement: not known
- Armament: one 30-pounder rifle; two 12-pounder rifles; two 24-pounder howitzers

USS Fort Morgan was a steamer acquired by the Union Navy during the American Civil War. She was used by the Navy as a storeship and in other minor roles.

Fort Morgan, a screw steamer, was built in 1863 by S. H. Pook, Fair Haven, Connecticut, as Admiral; purchased 8 January 1864; and commissioned as Admiral 5 February 1864, Acting Volunteer Lieutenant W. B. Eaton in command. She was renamed Fort Morgan 1 September 1864.

== Assigned as storeship to the Gulf Blockade ==
As storeship for the ships of the Gulf Blockading Squadrons, the steamer sailed from New York City and other east coast ports with provisions, munitions, passengers, and general stores for ships on station between Key West, Florida, and Galveston, Texas.

== Catching blockade runners on her own ==
Several times while making passage from one port to another on this duty she gave chase to blockade runners, capturing steamer Ysabel out of Havana, Cuba, 28 May 1864, and two small schooners in November.

== Post-war decommissioning and sale ==
She was decommissioned at New York City 22 August 1865, and sold 5 September 1865.
