= USS Rodolph =

Gunboat of the United States Navy

Coordinates: 30.70°N 87.93°W

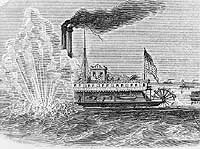
- USS Rodolph strikes a mine

History

United States
- Cost: $34,900
- Launched: 1863
- Acquired: 31 December 1863
- Commissioned: 28 May 1864
- Out of service: 1 April 1865
- Stricken: 1865 (est.)
- Fate: Sank, 1 April 1865

General characteristics
- Displacement: 217 tons
- Propulsion: steam engine; stern wheel-propelled
- Complement: 60
- Armament: two 32-pounder guns; four 24-pounders howitzers
- Armour: tinclad

USS Rodolph was a steamer (Note: The "Dictionary of American Naval Fighting Ships" describes Rodolph as a side-wheel steamer; however, the Naval Historical Center describes her as a stern-wheel steamer. The Naval Historical Center shows a line engraving of Rodolph, published in the Harper's Weekly 29 April 1865 issue, showing Rodolph as a stern wheeler.) commissioned by the Union Navy during the American Civil War. She served the Union Navy during its struggle against the Confederate States of America, both as a tugboat and a minesweeper, as well as a gunboat when the occasion demanded. Just as the war was ending, Rodolph struck a mine and sank, with four of her crew killed and a number of others wounded.

== Service history ==
Rodolph (Gunboat No. 48), a steamer built in 1863 at Cincinnati, Ohio, was purchased by the Rear Admiral David Dixon Porter of the U.S. Navy on 31 December 1863 for service in the Mississippi Squadron. However, the installation of her "tinclad" armor and fitting out were slow. When she was finally ready for active service, she was transferred to Admiral David Farragut's West Gulf Blockading Squadron which was then preparing for the invasion of Mobile Bay.

Commissioned at New Orleans, Louisiana, on 28 May 1864, the stern-wheeler, commanded by Act. Vol. Lt. George D. Upham, operated on the lower Mississippi River until after the historic Union naval victory in Mobile Bay on 5 August. She joined Farragut's invasion force there on the 14th and participated in operations which culminated in the surrender of Fort Morgan on the 23d. Acting Master's Mate Nathaniel B. Hinckley, serving on board the "tinclad," carried the Confederate flag from the fort.

Rodolph's shallow draft enabled her to be especially useful during "mop up" operations while Union seapower projected General Edward Canby's army against the final defenses of the city of Mobile, Alabama. The high point of her service came, perhaps, on 8 September, when she entered the Bon Secours River with the side-wheeler Stockdale and demolished extensive salt works which had been producing, daily, some 2,000 bushels of badly needed salt for the Confederacy.

On the 11th, the two ships escorted a Union Army transport, Planter, up the Fish River to seize a sawmill engine and some 60,000 board feet (140 m^{3}) of lumber. That night, as the Union ships retired down the river from the wrecked mill, southern riflemen fired upon them from the riverbanks and felled trees in their path. While the gunboats fired back rapidly, Rodolph battered her way through the obstructions, enabling the expedition to reach safety.

=== Sinking ===
Diverse and dangerous duties in Mobile Bay and in nearby streams kept the "tinclad" busy until almost the end of the Civil War. The most difficult task facing her and her sister ships was clearing torpedoes (mines) from the captured Confederate waters. On 1 April 1865, as she was towing a barge to assist in salvaging the sunken monitor Milwaukee, Rodolph was herself sunk when she struck a mine in the Blakeley River. The explosion killed four men and wounded 11 others.
