= USS Augusta Dinsmore =

Gunboat of the United States Navy

History

United States
- Laid down: date unknown
- Launched: 1863
- Acquired: 17 July 1963
- Commissioned: circa 21 July 1863
- Decommissioned: 28 August 1865
- Stricken: 1865 (est.)
- Fate: Sold, 5 September 1865

General characteristics
- Displacement: 834 tons
- Length: 169 ft (52 m)
- Beam: 32 ft 6 in (9.91 m)
- Draught: depth of hold 8 ft 8 in (2.64 m); draft 12 ft 6 in (3.81 m)
- Propulsion: steam engine; screw-propelled
- Speed: 11 knots
- Complement: 70
- Armament: two 12-pounder rifles

USS Augusta Dinsmore was a steamer acquired by the Union Navy during the American Civil War. She was used by the Union Navy as a gunboat in support of the Union naval blockade of Confederate waterways. Because of her relatively large size, she was also sometimes used as a cargo ship.

== Service history ==
By February 1863, Augusta Dinsmore—a screw steamer completed in 1863 at Mystic, Connecticut—was operating for the Adams Express Company, moving up and down the Atlantic coast between Northern ports and the Union Navy's blockaders off Charleston, South Carolina, engaged primarily in carrying mail, passengers, and supplies to and from the South Atlantic Blockading Squadron.

Sometime in the late spring or early summer, she was chartered by the Navy for the use of that squadron and departed New York City on the morning of 30 June, carrying Rear Admiral John A. Dahlgren—who was to relieve Rear Admiral Samuel Francis Du Pont in command of the squadron—and new commanding officers for several warships assigned to the blockade. The steamer arrived off Port Royal, South Carolina, shortly after daybreak on 4 July. Two days later, the formal change of command took place on board USS Wabash, Du Font's flagship. Meanwhile, the Navy Department chose to buy the ship outright instead of using her for a protracted period under a charter and wrote to Dahlgren on 9 July informing him of the decision.

The transaction transferring title to the ship from William B. Dinsmore to the United States Government was completed on 17 July; and, four days later, Dahlgren detached Acting Master William Hamilton from the monitor USS Patapsco so that he might assume command of Augusta Dinsmore. Although the steamer's commissioned service dates from Hamilton's taking command, she had already served as Dahlgren's flagship during most of the time since she had brought him from New York City; and, but for a few brief interruptions when he temporarily embarked in other warships, she continued to carry out this duty through the remainder of July and most of August.

While his flag flew above Augusta Dinsmore, the admiral directed the naval aspects of joint Army-Navy operations against the defensive works which protected Charleston, South Carolina's harbor, particularly against Fort Wagner. These attacks finally forced the Confederate garrison to evacuate the fort secretly on the night of 6 September. While this unrelenting Union pressure was approaching its victorious climax, the iron-hulled, side-wheel steamer USS Philadelphia had arrived off Morris Island late in August and relieved Augusta Dinsmore as flagship, freeing her for other duty.

Dahlgren had only recently learned that the screw gunboat USS Madgie in Saint Catherine Sound—just south of Savannah, Georgia—was low on coal and in need of repairs. As a result, he sent Augusta Dinsmore to that station to take Madgie's place on guard there, and she blockaded those waters until 5 October when she was relieved by the side-wheeler USS Mahaska. Before sailing north at mid-month, Augusta Dinsmore embarked 149 men whose enlistments had expired. She stopped en route at Newport News, Virginia, for brief repairs and then continued on to New York City.

After the completion of her repairs there, Augusta Dinsmore was reassigned to the West Gulf Blockading Squadron and sailed for Key West, Florida, on 12 December 1863. When she reported to Rear Admiral David Farragut, he put her to work as a dispatch and supply ship and, for most of her remaining service, she operated out of New Orleans, Louisiana, carrying information and materiel to warships blockading on various stations along the Texas coast. Occasionally, her discharge of this duty was interrupted by temporary blockade duty when one of the regular blockaders became disabled, and no other replacement was available. However, she always soon returned to her regular logistical work and carried out this duty faithfully.

On occasion, chance encounters with blockade runners broke the monotony of her tedious, but highly important assignment. On 16 February, Acting Master Hamilton—having learned that the cotton-and-hide-laden Scio was preparing to depart Brazos Santiago, Texas, in violation of the blockade—seized that British brig and placed a crew from Augusta Dinsmore on board the prize. However, before Hamilton could tow Scio across the bar to begin the voyage to a prize court, a Union Army officer ". . . informed him that he [the Army man] had orders not to allow the vessel to proceed to sea." On 25 February, after protracted correspondence on the subject, Hamilton received a letter from Major General Francis Jay Herron "...ordering him to release the Scio, which...[Hamilton], not wishing to have a collision with the Army, did...under protest..." The matter was ultimately brought to the attention of both the Secretary of the Navy and the Secretary of War, but records of the final disposition of the case have not been found.

In the spring of 1864, Hamilton became ill and, sometime in June, Acting Volunteer Lieutenant Miner B. Crowell relieved him in command of Augusta Dinsmore. About daybreak on 11 September, as the steamer was proceeding generally southwest along the gulf coast from Galveston, Texas, she ". . . fell in with a schooner, with sails lowered down, drifting." Since the vessel—the British schooner John—was carrying 81 bales of cotton, Crowell "...seized her as a prize and sent her to New Orleans for adjudication..." On 28 October 1864, Augusta Dinsmore was making another supply run when she found herself in position to help Union screw gunboats USS Sciota and USS Chocura to capture another British schooner, Cora Smyser, which was attempting to slip into San Luis Pass, Texas, with an assorted cargo. Augusta Dinsmore continued to carry supplies to blockaders along the Texas coast through the end of the Civil War.

Following the Confederate collapse, she departed Pensacola, Florida, on 5 August and sailed north. She was decommissioned at New York on 28 August 1865 and sold at public auction there on 5 September 1865. Re-documented as Gulf City on 16 September 1865, the steamer remained in merchant service until she ran aground off Cape Lookout, North Carolina, on 11 January 1869. The wreck cost the lives of 23 persons.
