= USS Nymph =

Union Navy steamer in the American Civil War

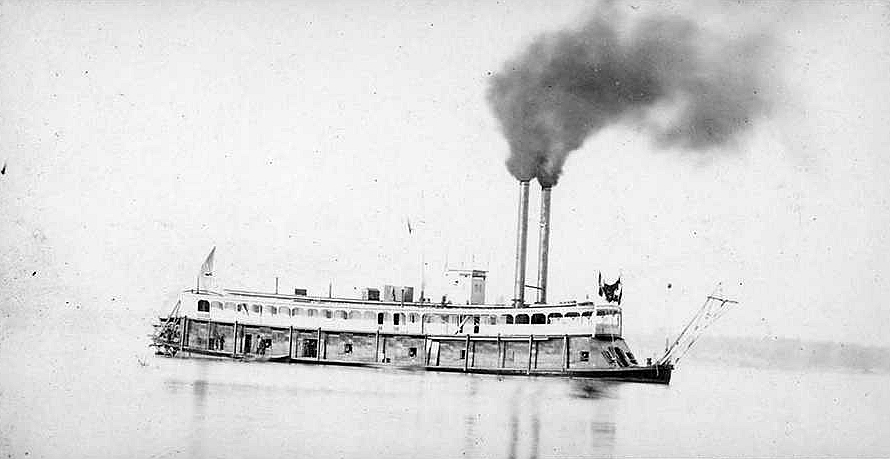

History

United States
- Ordered: as Cricket No. 3
- Laid down: date unknown
- Launched: 1863
- Acquired: 8 March 1864
- Commissioned: 11 April 1864
- Decommissioned: 28 June 1865
- Stricken: 1865 (est.)
- Fate: Sold, 17 August 1865

General characteristics
- Displacement: 171 tons
- Length: 161 ft 2 in (49.12 m)
- Beam: 30 ft 4 in (9.25 m)
- Draught: depth of hold 4 ft 2 in (1.27 m); draft 5 ft (1.5 m)
- Propulsion: steam engine; stern wheel-propelled
- Speed: 4 mph
- Complement: not known
- Armament: eight 24-pounder smoothbore guns
- Armour: tinclad

USS Nymph was a steamer acquired by the Union Navy during the American Civil War. She was used by the Union Navy as a dispatch boat in support of the Union Navy blockade of Confederate waterways.

== Cricket No. 3 commissioned as Nymph ==
Cricket No. 3, a stern wheel wooden river steamer built at Cincinnati, Ohio, in 1863, was purchased by the Navy at Cincinnati 8 March 1864, fitted out as a "tinclad" gunboat, and commissioned at Mound City, Illinois, as Nymph 11 April 1864, Acting Master Patrick Donnelly in command.

== Assigned to the Mississippi Squadron ==
Nymph patrolled the Mississippi River and its tributaries through the end of the Civil War, helping to maintain Union lines of supply and communication.

== Post-war decommissioning and sale ==
She decommissioned 2 1/2 miles above Cairo, Illinois, 28 June 1865 and was sold at public auction at Mound City 17 August 1865 to M. A. Hutchinson.

== See also ==
- Anaconda Plan
- Mississippi Squadron
