= Kappeler =

Kappeler is a surname. Notable people with the surname include:

- Andreas Kappeler (born 1943), Swiss historian
- Karl Kappeler (1816–1888), Swiss politician
- Gustave Kappeler (1881–?), French wrestler
- Susanne Kappeler (born 1949), British academic
- Thomas Kappeler (1953–2022), Swiss mathematician

== See also ==
- Kappelen
