= Robert Legvold =

American political scientist

Academic background
- Education: University of South Dakota (BA); The Fletcher School at Tufts University (MA, PhD)

Academic work
- Discipline: International relations
- Institutions: Council on Foreign Relations; Carnegie Endowment for International Peace; Columbia University

Robert Legvold (born February 26, 1940) is an American political scientist, specializing in the international relations of the post-Soviet states. He is the Marshall D. Shulman Professor Emeritus in the Department of Political Science at Columbia University.

== Biography ==
Legvold was born in Minneapolis, Minnesota. He received his A.B. from the University of South Dakota (1962), followed by M.A. (1963) and M.A.L.D. (1964) degrees at The Fletcher School where he also earned his Ph.D. in 1967.

From 1986 to 1992 Legvold was Director of Columbia's Harriman Institute for Advanced Study of the Soviet Union. He was Associate Director 1984-1986, a role he had assumed as early as 1977–78 as Acting Associate Director while on leave from Tufts University. At Tufts, Legvold had been teaching political science as Assistant Professor (1967–70) and Associate Professor (1970–77).

For six years, Legvold served as Senior Fellow and Director of the Soviet Studies Project at the Council on Foreign Relations in New York. In 2005, he was named a fellow of the American Academy of Arts and Sciences.

From 2009–2012, Legvold was director of the “Euro-Atlantic Security Initiative” sponsored by the Carnegie Endowment for International Peace and co-chaired by Sam Nunn, Wolfgang Ischinger, and Igor Ivanov.
