= Timothy M. Frye =

American political scientist

Academic background
- Education: Middlebury College (BA); Columbia University (MA); Columbia University (PhD)

Academic work
- Discipline: Political science
- Institutions: Columbia University (2006-); Higher School of Economics (2011-2022); Ohio State University (1997-2006)

Timothy M. Frye is an American political scientist. He is the Marshall D. Shulman Professor of Post-Soviet Foreign Policy in the Department of Political Science at Columbia University, and the author of five books.

== Biography ==
Frye received a B.A. in Russian language and literature from Middlebury College in 1986, an M.I.A. from the School of International and Public Affairs, Columbia University in 1992, and a Ph.D. from Columbia Graduate School of Arts and Sciences in 1997. Frye was the director of the Harriman Institute at Columbia University from 2009 to 2015 and Chair of the Political Science Department from 2016-2019. From 2011-2022, he was the academic supervisor and leading research fellow of the International Center for the Study of Institutions and Development (ICSID) at the Higher School of Economics in Moscow, but left that position in March 2022. Since 2016, he is the editor of Post-Soviet Affairs. In 2024, he was named to the Scholars Council at the Kluge Center of the Library of Congress.

== Awards ==
He won the Best Book Award from the Comparative Democratization Section of the American Political Science Association for Building States and Markets after Communism: The Perils of Polarized Democracy in 2011. Previously, he won the 2001 Hewett Prize from the American Association for the Advancement of Slavic Studies. He was a fellow at the Russell Sage Foundation in 2019-2020 and held the Carnegie Chair in Russian Studies at the Kluge Center at the Library of Congress in 2023.

== Bibliography ==
- Workplace Politics: How Politicians and Employers Subvert Elections. with Ora John Reuter and David Szakonyi. Oxford University Press, 2025. ISBN 9780197802014
- Weak Strongman: The Limits of Power in Putin's Russia. Princeton University Press, 2021. ISBN 9780691212463
- Property Rights and Property Wrongs: How Power, Institutions, and Norms Shape Economic Conflict in Russia. Cambridge University Press, 2017.ISBN 9781316610107
- Building States and Markets After Communism: The Perils of Polarized Democracy. Cambridge University Press, 2010. ISBN 9780521734622
- Brokers and Bureaucrats: Building Market Institutions in Russia. University of Michigan Press, 2000.ISBN 978-0-472-02348-6
