= Appanage Russia =

Period in medieval Russian history

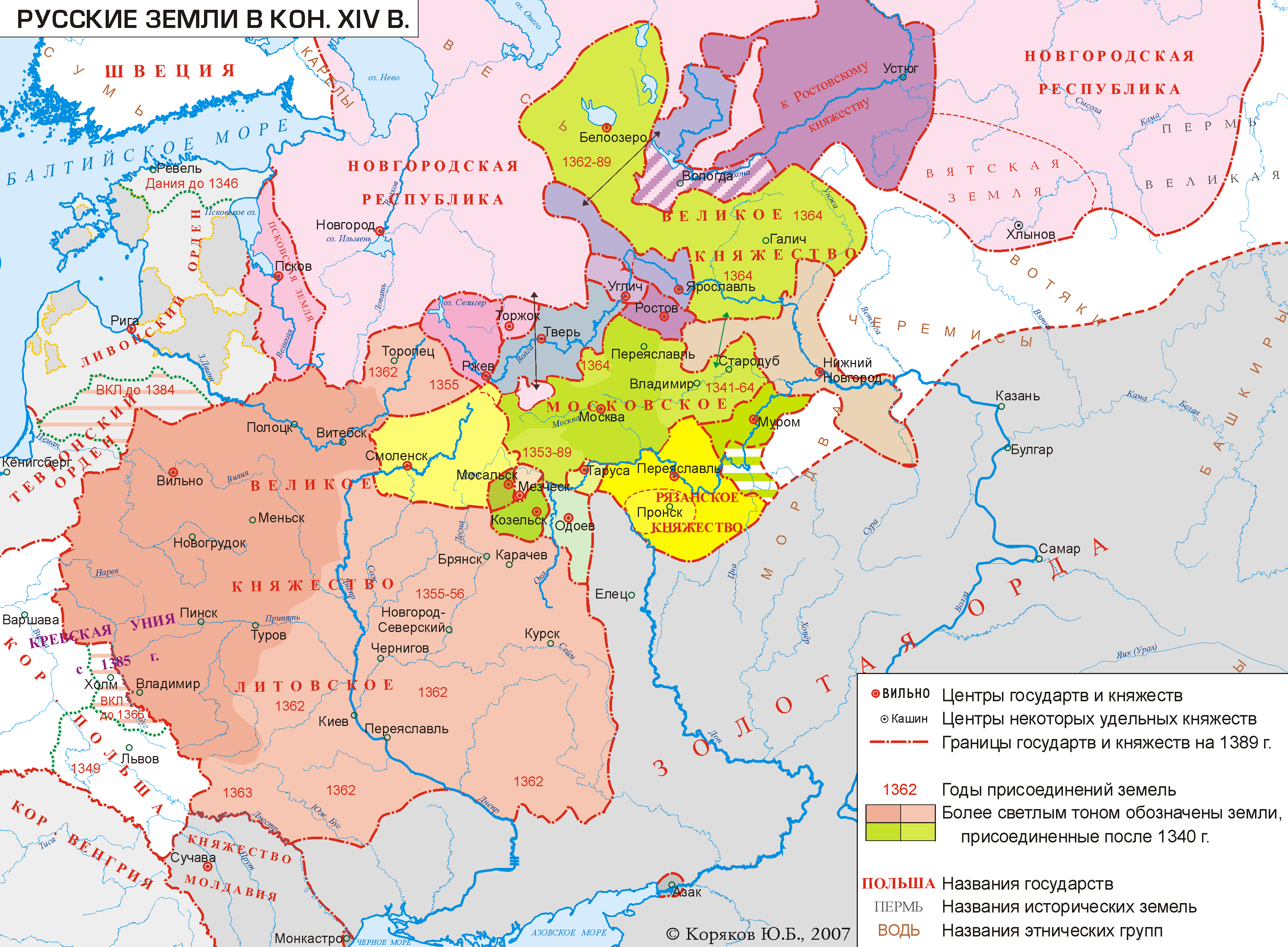
The Russian principalities in 1389 along with the Grand Duchy of Lithuania.

Appanage Russia, (Note: Russian: Удельная Русь, romanized: Udelnaya Rus.) also known as the period of appanages or the appanage period, (Note: Russian: удельный период.) and sometimes referred to as the period of fragmentation, (Note: Russian: период раздробленности.) was a period of Russian history spanning the 12th to 15th centuries.

Following the disintegration of Kievan Rus', over a dozen independent principalities emerged due to feudal fragmentation. Those principalities in turn fragmented further due to the custom of princes dividing their territories into appanages, which led to the proliferation of smaller appanage principalities. The Grand Principality of Vladimir, for instance, fragmented into over a dozen appanage principalities by the end of the 13th century.

These polities, known collectively as the Russian principalities, (Note: Russian: русские княжества.) or as the Russian lands, (Note: Russian: русские земли.) were ruled by princes from the Rurikid dynasty. From this point on, medieval Russia constituted a loose conglomerate of principalities, alongside two city-republics: Novgorod and Pskov. Although republican institutions developed in Novgorod and Pskov, the head of state remained a prince invited from a neighboring principality.

By the late 15th and early 16th centuries, the remaining Russian principalities had been united with the Grand Principality of Moscow, leading to the creation of a centralized state. The end of the appanage period is typically dated to the reign of Ivan III (1462–1505) and it was succeeded by a new period in Russian history, known as Muscovite Russia.

== History ==
=== Background ===
Following the Christianization of Kievan Rus' in 988, spiritual leadership belonged to the Byzantine Empire. After the death of Yaroslav the Wise in 1054, Kievan Rus' experienced a period of civil strife between his sons Iziaslav, Sviatoslav and Vsevolod. The following century, this was followed by a period of political fragmentation and decentralization. The proliferation of many smaller principalities weakened political unity, and by the mid-12th century, the capital Kiev was in decline. The lack of political unity in part facilitated the Mongol conquest. The traditional view has been that Kiev was in economic decline from the mid-12th century; however, some recent historians have instead adopted the view that there was economic expansion in the late Kievan period as the creation of new appanages represented the division of labor and delegation of authority among the Rurikids.

In the 12th century, 13 entities based on territorial units known as volosti emerged. They began to be called zemli ('lands'), a term used for sovereign states. From the mid-12th century, the term volost came to refer primarily not to a large principality, but rather to a part of its territory ruled by a particular prince.

=== 13th–15th centuries ===
From the mid-13th century, the Russian principalities were dominated by the Golden Horde following their conquest by Batu Khan. Previously, princes and grand princes governed themselves and only had to acknowledge the spiritual ascendancy of the Byzantine emperor, but during Mongol rule, they had to be confirmed by the Mongol khan in order to have any power, and the Russians later began referring to the khan as tsar – a title that had previously been reserved for the universal Christian ruler. The only Russian land that was not governed by a prince was Novgorod, although it still depended on an extraneous prince and his army to defend its borders.

Güyük Khan appointed his own governors to oversee the Russian principalities. The tribute was known as the dan by the Russians; its main purpose was not only to tax subjects but also to conscript young men into the Mongol armies. Although the Russian princes did not unanimously support Mongol supervision at first, Mengu-Timur was able to strengthen his ties with the Russian principalities by making the Russian Church cooperate with the Mongol administrators. In 1267, he made Russian clergy exempt from taxation and military service, which was in line with the Mongol policy of religious tolerance. From the 1260s, local nobles collected taxes on the khan's behalf, and in an attempt to gain the support of the nobility, the Mongols allowed them to keep their land. Until 1380, the khans of the Golden Horde exercised political control over the Russian principalities, and from 1380 to 1480, they continued to demand tribute from the Russian princes, although they did not always receive this. The period until 1480 is known as the "Tatar yoke". Extrapolating from 1549 data, George Vernadsky estimated the annual tribute to be approximately 145,000 rubles, plus an additional 25,000 rubles from Novgorod under a special tax, equivalent to 15.6 tons of silver.

The leading Russian figure was the grand prince of Vladimir, which led to a struggle among the princes for the title. The grand prince had the right to collect the taxes from all the princes on behalf of the khan of the Golden Horde. However, this role was a heavy burden on the prince. Aleksandr Nevsky became grand prince in 1251, and when the Mongol census-takers and tax collectors came to Novgorod, there was resistance against what the Chronicle of Novgorod describes as "accursed, raw-eating Tartars" until Aleksandr was forced to lead an army into the city.

Between the Mongol conquest and the end of the 13th century, the fragmentation of the Grand Principality of Vladimir intensified as eight new principalities emerged: Starodub, Suzdal, Tver, Galich-Dmitrov, Kostroma, Moscow, Gorodets, and Belozersk. In addition, the following principalities had already separated: Rostov, Yaroslavl, Uglich, Pereyaslavl, and Yuryev. Vladimir remained the "capital" principality, and following the death of Aleksandr Nevsky, a practice emerged whereby the grand principality was held by representatives of one of the appanage principalities. This system remained subject to the traditional practice of collateral succession, which continued until the end of the century. The territory of the grand principality did not remain unchanged, as Kostroma, Pereyaslavl, Nizhny Novgorod, and Yuryev reverted to the grand prince as escheats in 1277, 1305, 1320, and the 1340s, respectively. The khan also exerted significant influence over the territory of the grand principality. (Note: In 1328, Özbeg Khan divided the grand principality between Ivan I of Moscow and Aleksandr of Suzdal, with Kostroma and the right to the throne of Novgorod going to the former, and Vladimir and the former territory of Nizhny Novgorod going to the latter. In 1341, Özbeg Khan gave Nizhny Novgorod to the princes of Suzdal, leading to the establishment of the Principality of Nizhny Novgorod-Suzdal.)

By the early 14th century, two dynastic houses, those of Tver and Moscow, competed for the grand princely title. Due to conflict among the princes, political life in the Russian principalities was highly unstable, with at least 10 Russian princes being executed during the reign of Özbeg Khan. He later gave his support to Ivan I of Moscow, which allowed the house of Moscow to eventually dominate the other principalities, and later challenge the Golden Horde itself. The seat of the Russian metropolitan was also moved to Moscow in 1325, establishing it as the spiritual center of Russian Orthodoxy. Jani Beg (r. 1342–1357) continued to support the house of Moscow and relations between the Russian principalities became stable. He was also able to maintain the balance of power between Moscow, Tver and Nizhny Novgorod.

The grand prince of Vladimir also began to be known as the grand prince of all Russia in the 14th century. The first grand prince to bear this title was Mikhail of Tver, and it continued to be used by subsequent grand princes, including Ivan I, albeit infrequently. The title has been considered an imitation of that of the metropolitan, who held primacy over the Russian Church as a whole. From the second quarter of the 14th century, the territories ruled by the grand prince began to be referred to as the "Russian land". However, this did not mean that the grand princes renounced their efforts to expand their power into other territories; rather, it reinforced their claims. By the second half of the 14th century, the process of political consolidation around Moscow was well underway, with numerous appanage principalities being incorporated into the grand principality.

By 1371, Dmitry Donskoy was recognized as the grand prince of Moscow and Vladimir by both the Tatars and his cousins, and thus, the grand principality became his patrimony (otchina). In his 1389 will, he was able to bequeath his "patrimony, the grand principality" to his eldest son. Despite this, in the late 14th century, the grand prince of Moscow had little effective control over the other major political centers: Novgorod, Tver, Nizhny Novgorod-Suzdal and Ryazan. Although the other Russian principalities rarely challenged Moscow's hegemony directly, they grew increasingly independent in their relations with the Golden Horde and Lithuania, with some princes styling themselves as grand princes. However, this has been a point of contention among historians, with Anton Gorsky arguing that Nizhny Novgorod and Tver were only able to claim the status of grand principality in the 1360s. In addition, Gorsky says that a two-tier hierarchy of grand princes had emerged, with the grand prince of Vladimir retaining a higher status.

In Novgorod, republican institutions continued to develop during the 13th and 14th centuries. During the reign of Aleksandr Nevsky, Novgorod recognized the suzerainty of the grand princes of Vladimir, who still exercised executive powers, including the approval of judicial acts, land and property transactions, and documents regulating trade disputes. However, by the end of the 13th century, these matters were removed from the grand prince's jurisdiction in favor of republican judicial proceedings. From the 14th century, the grand prince's authority in Novgorod was largely nominal, although his suzerainty remained undisputed. In Pskov, which was initially dependent on Novgorod, a republican form of government also emerged during this period, although it continued to recognize the suzerainty of the grand prince of Vladimir in the 13th and early 14th centuries. In 1323, the government of Pskov entered into an alliance with Lithuania; however, by the end of the 14th century, the suzerainty of the grand prince was definitively restored.

Vasily I of Moscow was able to take advantage of the political strife within the Golden Horde. In 1392, he visited the court of Tokhtamysh, whose forces had recently been defeated by Timur, and was given permission to take the throne of Nizhny Novgorod-Suzdal. However, the principality was not fully incorporated until the mid-15th century. After Tokhtamysh's forces were destroyed in 1395, Vasily stopped paying tribute. However, after Edigu launched a devastating invasion in 1408 and Tatar raids continued in the following years, Vasily was forced to resume paying tribute and visit the khan to renew his patent to the throne. Once the Golden Horde fragmented into several smaller khanates, the grand princes of Moscow were able to eventually assert their authority over other Russian princes without Tatar approval; once the grand prince adopted the title of sovereign of all Russia, this marked the beginning of a new period.

=== End of the appanage period ===
Between the accessions of Ivan III in 1462 and Ivan IV in 1533, there was not only the "gathering of the Russian lands" that took place but also the development of an autocratic power structure. Although Ivan III did not completely end the practice of creating appanages, he saw appanages as a source of disunity and was able to bring the appanages inherited by his younger brothers under his effective control. He bequeathed two-thirds of his lands to his son Vasily, while the remaining third was divided among his four younger sons, but their authority was strictly limited. The last person to be granted an appanage principality was Ivan IV's son, Dmitry, who was given Uglich, in 1584.

This "gathering of power" over the other principalities involved the extension of patrimonial power by applying the principle of the votchina to them. The Russian Church supported this process, thereby implying that the Muscovite rulers "had an explicitly religious referent that did not include a discourse on natural law". As a result, the concept of popular sovereignty did not develop, and to integrate new territories, local elites were absorbed into the court of the grand prince. Around the same time, the system of mestnichestvo was also developed.

The Russian Church not only preserved the idea of unity amidst political fragmentation but also influenced attitudes toward service, with nobles expected to serve the Muscovite ruler without the right to depart. The monk Joseph of Volokolamsk, for instance, said the grand prince "was the master of all masters of the Russian land". The dependence of the metropolitan also changed when the Russian Church became de facto autocephalous in 1448; the metropolitan was no longer confirmed by the patriarch of Constantinople, and thus became even more dependent on the grand prince, although the roots of this dependence go back to the Byzantine idea of symphonia.

The relative swiftness of the strengthening of grand princely power, when compared to contemporary composite monarchies, meant that regional identities remained weak. Not only were local elites absorbed, but the policy of gathering Russian lands meant that local self-government was also not tolerated, leading to the termination of the autonomies of Novgorod and Pskov in 1478 and 1510, respectively. Moscow's absorption of Ryazan, the last remaining independent Russian principality, was little more than a formality; it was dependent on Moscow until Oleg Ivanovich was deposed in 1520 and the principality was formally annexed the following year. However, according to the historian Andreas Kappeler, in the territories acquired through expansion—such as the southern steppe and Siberia—the Russian government, "centralist and autocratic, was confronted with the task of integrating societies which possessed a corporate organization, different estates and regional traditions". As a result, the government treated the oaths given by nomadic peoples and the indigenous Siberians as an act of eternal submission, which allowed them to remain largely undisturbed. The image of the Russian Orthodox community playing a unifying role helped ensure that Russia did not become a composite state.

== Foreign relations ==
=== Golden Horde ===
The Mongols introduced a strict system of taxation in the Russian principalities. Following the Mongol conquest, the khan of the Golden Horde regularly sent tax collectors known as darughachi. These officials supervised the collection of tribute, but from the 1280s, the Russian grand princes took on this role. Initially, the responsibility for the collection of tribute rested with the grand prince of Vladimir, a title acquired by Ivan I of Moscow and passed on to his descendants. A more modest role was later given to the grand princes of Nizhny Novgorod, Tver, and Ryazan.

Many of the Russian princes were also required to visit the seat of the khan in order to receive confirmation of their office. The most significant princes first visited his seat in 1243–1245 to receive the patent (yarlyk) to their thrones, but princes soon began to visit his seat primarily when they laid claim to the grand princely throne. Other minor princes were not required to visit the khan, although when a dispute over succession occurred, pretenders would often visit the khan to present their cases.

The princes were also required to perform military service. Although the Mongols rarely deployed Russian auxiliary troops, they did participate in the Mongol invasions of Poland, Hungary, and the Caucasus. Russian troops were important when the khan intervened in Russian affairs, such as when Toqta provided military support to Andrey of Gorodets in 1293 against Dmitry of Pereslavl.

The Russian Church was granted a full exemption in 1267 as part of the Mongol policy of religious tolerance. Mengu-Timur also determined that Russian peasants would obey the nobles and religious leaders, and thus he used the tarkhan system to co-opt the nobility and win their support. These grants were translated from Mongol to Old Russian from the late 14th or early 15th century.

== Sources ==
- Anderson, M. S. (25 September 2014). The Origins of the Modern European State System, 1494-1618. Routledge. ISBN 978-1-317-89276-2.
- Channon, John; Hudson, Robert (1995). The Penguin Historical Atlas of Russia. Viking. ISBN 978-0-670-86461-4.
- Crummey, Robert O. (6 June 2014) [1987]. The Formation of Muscovy 1300–1613. Routledge. ISBN 978-1-317-87200-9.
- Favereau, Marie (20 April 2021). The Horde: How the Mongols Changed the World. Harvard University Press. ISBN 978-0-674-24421-4.
- Favereau, Marie; Pochekaev, Roman Yu. (2023). "The Golden Horde, c. 1260–1502". The Cambridge History of the Mongol Empire. Cambridge University Press. pp. 243–318. ISBN 978-1-107-11648-1.
- Feldbrugge, Ferdinand J. M. (2009). Law in Medieval Russia. BRILL. ISBN 978-90-04-16985-2.
- Feldbrugge, Ferdinand J. M. (2 October 2017). A History of Russian Law: From Ancient Times to the Council Code (Ulozhenie) of Tsar Aleksei Mikhailovich of 1649. BRILL. ISBN 978-90-04-35214-8.
- Fennell, John (2014) [1983]. The Crisis of Medieval Russia, 1200–1304. Longman History of Russia. Routledge. ISBN 978-0-582-48150-3.
- Filyushkin, Alexander (2021). "Why Did Russia Not Become a Composite State?". Russian History. 47 (3): 201–223. ISSN 0094-288X.
- Galeotti, Mark (7 November 2024). Forged in War: A military history of Russia from its beginnings to today. Bloomsbury Publishing. ISBN 978-1-4728-6249-5.
- Gonneau, Pierre (30 November 2022). "Russia from the Mongol invasion to the death of Ivan the Terrible (1242–1584)". In Menjot, Denis; Caesar, Mathieu; Garnier, Florent; Pijuan, Pere Verdés (eds.). The Routledge Handbook of Public Taxation in Medieval Europe. Taylor & Francis. pp. 372–388. doi:10.4324/9781003023838-19. ISBN 978-1-000-73636-6.
- Gorsky, Anton A. (2016). Русские земли в XIII-XIV веках: пути политического развития [The Russian lands in the 13th–14th centuries] (in Russian). Наука. ISBN 978-5-02-039659-3.
- Hautala, Roman (4 April 2022). "The Jochid Ulus". The Mongol World (1 ed.). Routledge. pp. 245–262. doi:10.4324/9781315165172-20. ISBN 978-1-315-16517-2.
- Paxton, John (1993). "Appanage Russia". Encyclopedia of Russian History: From the Christianization of Kiev to the Break-up of the U.S.S.R. ABC-CLIO. pp. 23–24. ISBN 978-0-87436-690-7.
- Pipes, Richard (1995). Russia Under the Old Regime: Second Edition. Penguin Publishing Group. ISBN 978-0-14-024768-8.
- Riasanovsky, Nicholas V. (29 September 2005). Russian Identities: A Historical Survey. Oxford University Press. ISBN 978-0-19-534814-9.
- Riasanovsky, Nicholas V.; Steinberg, Mark D. (2019). A History of Russia (9th ed.). New York: Oxford University Press. ISBN 978-0190645588.
- Sashalmi, Endre (25 October 2022). Russian Notions of Power and State in a European Perspective, 1462–1725: Assessing the Significance of Peter's Reign. Academic Studies Press. ISBN 978-1-64469-419-0.
- Vásáry, István (31 December 2014). "The Tatar Factor in the Formation of Muscovy's Political Culture". Nomads as Agents of Cultural Change. University of Hawai'i Press. pp. 252–270. doi:10.21313/hawaii/9780824839789.003.0011. ISBN 978-0-8248-3978-9.
- Wieczynski, Joseph L., ed. (1976). "Appanage period of Russian history". The Modern Encyclopedia of Russian and Soviet History. Vol. 2. Gulf Breeze, Fl: Academic International Press. p. 66. ISBN 978-0-87569-064-3.
- Wilbur, Elvira M. (2004). "Appanage era". In Millar, James R. (ed.). Encyclopedia of Russian History. Macmillan Reference USA. p. 69. ISBN 978-0-02-865907-7.
- Ziegler, Charles E. (13 October 2009). The History of Russia (2nd ed.). Bloomsbury Academic. ISBN 978-0-313-36307-8.
