= Alexander Dallin =

American historian (1924–2000)

Alexander D. Dallin
- Born: 21 May 1924; Berlin, Prussia, Germany
- Died: 22 July 2000 (aged 76); Stanford, California

Academic background
- Thesis: German Policy and the Occupation of the Soviet Union, 1941–1944 (1953)
- Doctoral advisor: Philip Mosely

Academic work
- Discipline: Historian

Alexander Davidovich Dallin (21 May 1924 – 22 July 2000) was an American historian, political scientist, and international relations scholar at Columbia University, where he was the Adlai Stevenson Professor of International Relations and the director of the Russian Institute. Dallin was also the Raymond A. Spruance Professor of International History at Stanford University, and served as Director for the Center for Russian and East European Studies.

== Early life and education ==
Dallin was born in Berlin, Germany, on 21 May 1924. He was the son of Menshevik leader David Dallin, a Russian revolutionary who had gone into exile from Vladimir Lenin's Bolsheviks in 1921, and David's first wife, the former Eugenia Bein. The family then fled the Nazi persecution of the Jews, becoming trapped in Vichy France for a while. Leaving on the SS Excalibur from Lisbon, Portugal, they arrived in the United States in November 1940.

Dallin graduated from George Washington High School in New York City in 1941. Another refugee from Germany, Henry Kissinger, was his classmate. Dallin became a naturalized citizen of the United States in 1943. He enrolled at City College of New York, but then interrupted his studies in 1943 to enlist in the United States Army. Due to his fluency in German, Russian, and French, he was assigned to Military Intelligence, in which he interrogated German prisoners of war. He was discharged from the Army in 1946. Returning to the U.S., Dallin completed his undergraduate degree at City College of New York in 1947, and then a master's degree and Ph.D. from Columbia University in 1948 and 1953, respectively.

== Early career and Columbia years ==
During his graduate studies, Dallin joined the Harvard Project on the Soviet Social System. There he interviewed refugees and émigrés from the Soviet Union, better to understand the characteristics and workings of the Soviet system based on reports of those interviewed. Dallin married the former Florence Cherry, the daughter of a Methodist minister, in 1953. They raised three children, settling in Leonia, New Jersey. During 1951–1954, Dallin served as associate director for the Research Program on the USSR in New York. From 1954 to 1956, he was director of research at the War Documentation Project in Washington and Virginia, analyzing captured German documents from the war. Stemming in part from his interviews during the Harvard Project, in 1957 Dallin published German Rule in Russia, 1941–1945, which became the classic, definitive account of the German occupation of parts of Russia during World War II. It won the George Louis Beer Prize for European international history since 1895.

In 1956, Dallin became an assistant professor of political science at Columbia University. He became professor of international relations in 1961 and received the Adlai Stevenson chair in 1965. Dallin was director of Columbia's Russian Institute from 1962 to 1967. While at Columbia, he was recipient of one of the Guggenheim Fellowships awarded in 1961 and a Fulbright Hays fellowship in 1965–1966. He made several appearances as a presenter on the nationally broadcast television series Columbia Lectures in International Studies. Dallin also served as a part-time consultant to the U.S. Government during much of the 1960s. Marshall D. Shulman, who also served as director of the Russian Institute, later noted Dallin's objectivity, saying, "In a field riven by political controversy, he was universally respected as a voice of common sense and scholarly detachment rooted in a solid historical backing."

== Stanford years ==
In 1970, Dallin and his family left for the West Coast and he became a fellow at the Center for Advanced Study in the Behavioral Sciences and a visiting professor at University of California, Berkeley. In 1971, he joined the faculty of Stanford University. There Dallin became the Raymond A. Spruance Professor of International History and served as Director for the Center for Russian and East European Studies. He was a Wilson Center fellow during 1978–79. His first marriage ended in divorce and Dallin married Gail W. Lapidus, a senior fellow at Stanford's Institute for International Studies and a professor of political science. The two would frequently collaborate on his later works.

Dallin was frequently present in open-to-the-public Center for Russian and East European Studies seminars on campus where his expertise and talent were shared. The Faculty Senate at Stanford reported that Dallin "chaired virtually every major committee in the field". He was a long-time member of the American Association for the Advancement of Slavic Studies and he helped re-energize the organization by bringing its headquarters to Stanford and served as its president from 1984 to 1985. Dallin had earlier been president of the Western Slavic Association from 1978 to 1980.

Interested in reviving the social sciences in post-Soviet Russia, in 1994, Dallin helped found the European University at Saint Petersburg. He also founded, with Condoleezza Rice, the New Democracy Fellows Program at Stanford. David Holloway and Norman Naimark edited a Festschrift in honor of Dallin, Reexamining the Soviet Experience: Essays in Honor of Alexander Dallin, published in 1996. Dallin formally retired in 1996 but continued to write, teach, and participate in academic activities. He died of heart failure in Stanford, California, on 22 July 2000, having suffered a stroke the day before. Holloway, who succeeded to the Spruance chair, subsequently said that Dallin was "the model scholar-organizer" and that he "had a profound and beneficial influence on the field of Soviet and East European studies. For him the study of the Soviet Union was not a question of confirming an already held point of view but rather a matter of seeking to understand a complex and changing reality."

== Published works ==
- German Rule in Russia, 1941–1945: A Study of Occupation Policies (Macmillan, 1957). Revised edition 1981.
- Opposition to Sovietization in Belorussian Literature (1917–1957) (Institute for the Study of the USSR, 1958).
- Soviet Conduct in World Affairs. A Selection of Readings (Columbia University Press, 1960) [editor]
- The Soviet Union at the United Nations: An Inquiry into Soviet Motives and Objectives (Frederick A. Praeger, 1962).
- Diversity in International Communism: A Documentary Record, 1961–1963 (Columbia University Press, 1963) [editor, with Jonathan Harris and Grey Hodnett]
- Russian Diplomacy and Eastern Europe, 1914–1917 (King's Crown Press, 1963) [with others]
- The Soviet Union and Disarmament: An Appraisal of Soviet Attitudes and Intentions (Frederick A. Praeger, 1964; a version with variant title published directly by Columbia University) [with others]
- Politics in the Soviet Union: Seven Cases (Harcourt Brace, 1966) [editor, with Alan F. Westin]
- Soviet Politics since Khrushchev (Prentice Hall, 1968) [editor, with Thomas B. Larson]
- Political Terror in Communist Systems (Stanford University Press, 1970) [with George W. Breslauer]
- Women in Russia (Stanford University Press, 1977) [editor, with Dorothy Atkinson and Gail Warshofsky Lapidus]
- Black Box: KAL 007 and the Superpowers (University of California Press, 1985).
- The Gorbachev Era (Stanford Alumni Association, 1986) [editor, with Condoleezza Rice]
- U.S.-Soviet Security Cooperation: Achievements, Failures, Lessons (Oxford University Press, 1988) [editor, with Alexander L. George and Philip J. Farley]
- Between Totalitarianism and Pluralism: Articles on Russian and Soviet History, 1500–1991 (Garland Publishing, 1992) [editor]
- The Nature of the Soviet System (1992) [editor]
- Odessa, 1941–1944: A Case Study of Soviet Territory under Foreign Rule (Center for Romanian Studies, 1998)
- The Soviet System in Crisis (Westview Press, 1991); republished as The Soviet System: From Crisis To Collapse (Westview Press, 1994) [editor, with Gail W. Lapidus]
- Dimitrov and Stalin, 1934–1943: Letters from the Soviet Archives (Yale University Press, 2000) [editor, with F. I. Firsov]
- The Uses of History: Understanding the Soviet Union and Russia (Rowman & Littlefield, 2009) [collection of essays, edited by Gail W. Lapidus]
