= Alexander Cooley =

American professor and political scientist

- Relatives: John K. Cooley (father)

Academic background
- Education: Swarthmore College (BA); Columbia University (PhD)

Academic work
- Discipline: Political science
- Institutions: Barnard College; Columbia University

Alexander A. Cooley is an American political scientist. He is Claire Tow professor at Barnard College. He served as the 15th director of the Harriman Institute of Columbia University and is currently the vice provost for research, libraries and academic centers at Barnard College.

== Biography ==
Cooley graduated from Swarthmore College and received his Ph.D. from Columbia University, studying under Hendrik Spruyt and Mark von Hagen. He taught at Johns Hopkins University before joining the faculty of Barnard College in 2001, eventually serving as chair of the college's political science department. In 2015, he was named director of Columbia's Harriman Institute, serving in the position for six years.

Cooley has written extensively about the politics of the former-Soviet states, with an emphasis on Central Asia and the Caucasus, as well as the liberal international order and democratic backsliding. His analysis of great power politics in Central Asia was called by National Bureau of Asian Research as "possibly the most cogent critique of post–Cold War orthodoxy published to date."

== Bibliography ==
- Logics of Hierarchy: The Organization of Empires, States, and Military Occupations, Cornell University Press, 2005.
- Base Politics: Democratic Change and the U.S. Military Overseas, Cornell University Press, 2008.
- Contracting States: Sovereign Transfers in International Relations, Princeton University Press, 2009.
- Great Games, Local Rules: The New Great Power Contest in Central Asia, Oxford University Press, 2012.
- Ranking the World: Grading states as a Tool of Global Governance, Cambridge University Press, 2015
- Dictators Without Borders: Power and Money in Central Asia, Yale University Press, 2017.
- Exit from Hegemony: The Unraveling of the American Global Order, Oxford University Press, 2020.
- Undermining American Hegemony: Goods Substitution in World Politics, Cambridge University Press, 2021.

== Personal life ==
Cooley's father was journalist John K. Cooley, who served as an editor of The Christian Science Monitor.

== See also ==
- Zombie Election Monitors
