= Lilia Estrin Dallin =

Russian Trotskyist (1898–1981)

Lilia Estrin Dallin (born Lilya Ginzberg; 1898–1981) (aka Lola Estrin, Paulsen, Lilya Ginzberg) was a prominent member of Trotsky's Paris organization in the 1930s, the wife of the Menshevik David Dallin, and has been suspected of being an NKVD asset because of her association with NKVD agent Mark Zborowski.

== Early life ==
She was born in Liepāja, Courland, in 1898 under the name of Liliya Ginzberg (Lilija Ginzberga), and she lived there until 1914. After studying law in Moscow, she became a member of the Menshevik party. In 1923 she emigrated to Berlin where she married Samuel Estrin. The couple professed to be Mensheviks, then changed to being Leninists and Left Oppositionists. After the Nazis rose to power, in 1933, they moved to Paris. (Her CIA dossier shows that she came directly to Paris from Moscow not from Berlin as she claimed.)

In Paris Lilia found work as a secretary for Boris Nicolaevsky at the International Institute of Social History, and she befriended Trotsky's son Lev Sedov, working with him on the Trotskyist journal, Bulletin of the Opposition. She appeared to be the sole support for her husband and his relatives. "I work like an ox," she wrote to Natalia Sedova, "from early morning to late into the night, and I am content. My job (with the Institute) is interesting. After it, I work for the Bulletin and other (Trotskyite) matters which keep me up until one o'clock at night. At seven in the morning I am up again . . . I need no Sundays, no respite. I am a dynamic person, I need action." When NKVD agents broke into the Institute and stole Trotsky's papers, on 6 November 1936, a number of Trotskyists began to suspect that she, along with Mark Zborowski, were NKVD agents. After Lev Sedov died in a Paris hospital under mysterious circumstances in March 1938, his mistress accused Lilia of being an NKVD agent and causing his death. But Lilia was able to convince Trotsky that both she and Zborowski were the innocent victims of NKVD slanders.

== United States ==
After moving to the United States, Lilia married David Dallin, a Menshevik and Russian historian. The defector Alexander Orlov revealed to both of them in 1955 that Mark Zborowski was an NKVD agent, and he suspected that Lilia was also an agent, a theme he repeatedly stressed in his CIA debriefings. Orlov also claimed that David Dallin had been a paid Soviet agent in Berlin in the 1920s, controlled by Boris Bazarov and relaying information to the Soviets from a source inside the German Foreign Ministry. Lilia appeared in March 1956 before a Senate Subcommittee to publicly denounce Zborowski and to describe her role in the Trotskyist faction.

In 1972 a CIA historian produced a classified report which dispensed with allegations and named Lilia as an NKVD agent, though no new evidence was revealed in the report which had not otherwise been available twenty years earlier. The CIA declassified the report in 1994. The release of the Venona material exculpated Lilia. She is named in decrypts from May to August 1944, with regard to her involvement in the Victor Kravchenko defection, and a reading of these documents clearly indicates that she was not a Soviet agent.

== Sources ==
- John Costello and Oleg Tsarev, Deadly Illusions : The KGB Orlov Dossier Reveals Stalin's Master Spy, Crown Publishing, 1993. ISBN 0-517-58850-1
- Lilia Dallin, "Testimony Before U.S. Senate Committee on the Judiciary, March 2, 1956," Scope of Soviet Activity in the United States, Part 5, GPO, 1956.
- Rita Kronenbitter (pseud), Leon Trotsky: Dupe of the NKVD, Center for the Study of Intelligence (CIA), 1972.
- Venona/NSA site
