= Boris Nicolaevsky =

Russian Marxist activist (1887–1966)

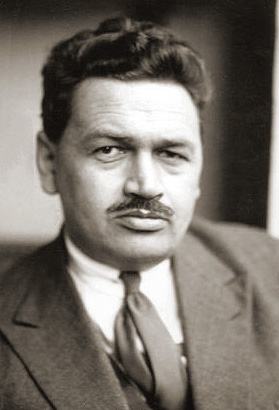
Nicolaevsky in 1936

Boris Ivanovich Nicolaevsky (Russian: Бори́с Ива́нович Никола́евский; 20 October 1887 – 22 February 1966) was a Russian Marxist activist, archivist, and historian. Nicolaevsky is best remembered as one of the leading Menshevik public intellectuals of the 20th century.

== Biography ==
=== Early years ===
Boris Nicolaevsky was born on 20 October 1887 N.S. in Belebey, Bashkiria, then part of the Russian Empire the oldest of seven children of an Orthodox priest of Greek origin. He became interested in radical politics at the age of 14, for which he was expelled from the Gymnasium (secondary school) in Samara as a "bad political influence." His family then moved to Ufa, where he joined the Bolshevik wing of the Russian Social Democratic Labour Party, though he switched to the Mensheviks when he was still a youth. He was arrested in 1904, which meant that his schooling ended at 16. Subsequently, he was arrested another seven times and sent into Siberian exile three times by the Tsarist government.

=== Political career ===
Following the Russian Revolution of 1917, Nicolaevsky became the head of the Marx-Engels Institute in Moscow. In 1918, he was elected to the Central Committee of the RSDLP (Mensheviks). As an active Menshevik, Nicolaevsky was arrested by the Soviet secret police on 22 February 1921 and in 1922 was sentenced to be deported from Soviet Russia indefinitely. He was stripped of his Soviet citizenship in February 1932, for criticising the forced collectivisation of agriculture and the dictatorship.

Nicolaevsky settled in Berlin, where he was a member of the Foreign Delegation of the Menshevik party, and established himself as one of the leading historians of Soviet communism. He was associated with the Marx-Engels Institute there, before becoming the director of the International Institute of Social History in Amsterdam, repository of the archives of the Socialist International.

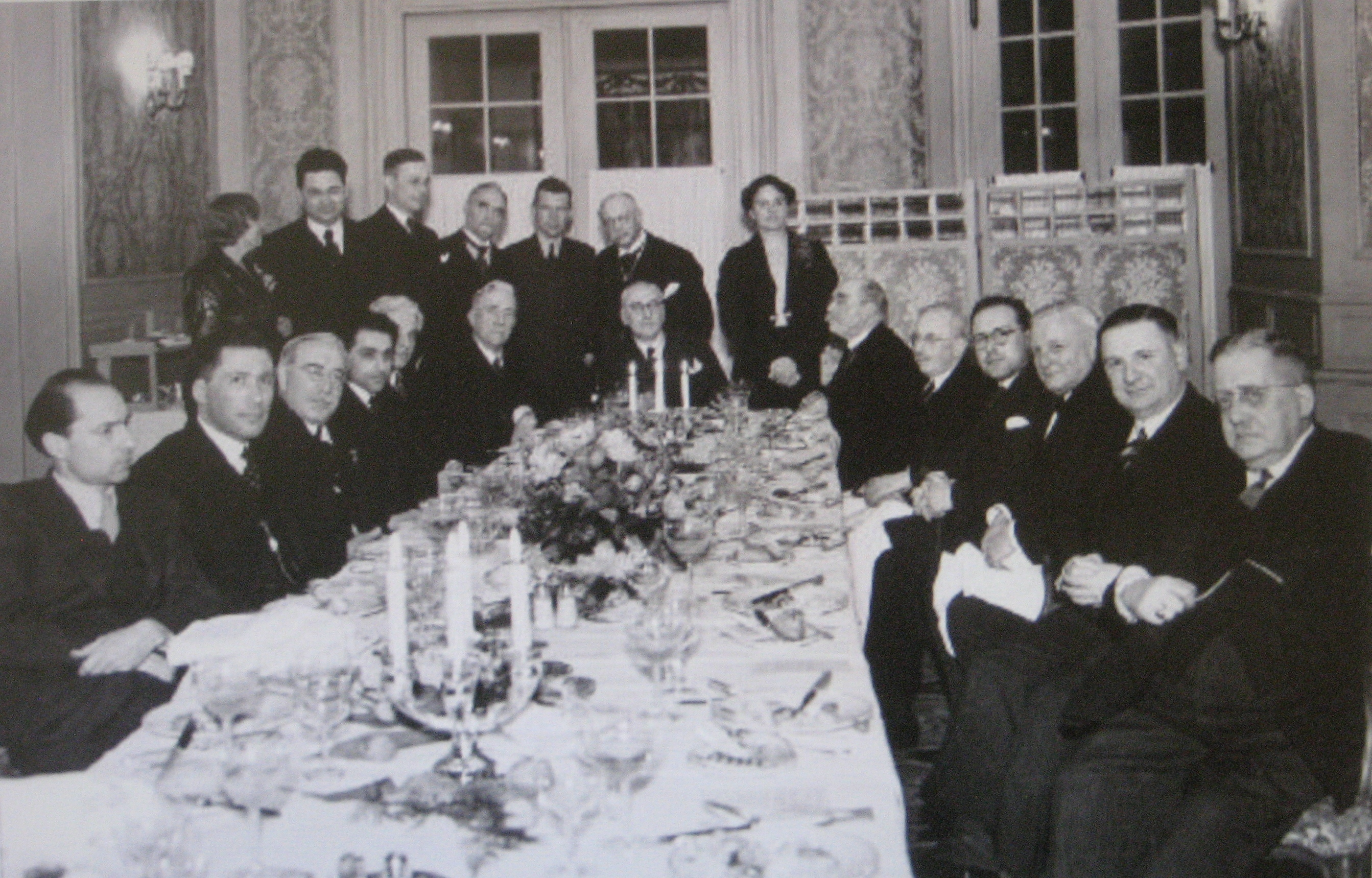
Dinner in Amsterdam (1937). Nicolaevsky standing, 2nd from left

Many individuals of all political complexions confided their archival treasures to him.

In June 1933, Nicolaevsky moved to Paris, to avoid living under Nazi rule. In March 1936, he had several long meetings with Nikolai Bukharin, who had been sent by Joseph Stalin to negotiate the purchase of original manuscripts by Karl Marx, which Nicolaevsky had smuggled out of Germany. Their conversations stretched through two months, and formed the basis of Nicolaevsky's Letter of an Old Bolshevik, which Bukharin's biographer described as "a remarkable document and the source of much of our knowledge about Soviet politics in the thirties". But years later, Bukharin's widow, who was with her husband in Paris, denounced the Letter as a "fraud", and denied that Bukharin had ever spoke to Nicolaevsky, except in the presence of witnesses. She was angry because Nicolaevsky had put her husband in danger. When Bukharin was on trial in March 1938, he was forced to confess that he had conducted "counter-revolutionary conversations" with Nicolaevsky. The negotiations failed because Stalin refused to accept the price demanded by Nicolaevsky.

Early in November 1936, Leon Trotsky's son, Lev Sedov and a collaborator named Mark Zborowski, aka 'Etienne', handed over a batch of Trotsky's papers to Nicolaevsky, to be stored at his premises at 7, rue Michelet, Paris. Less than a week later, burglars broke in and stole the papers, leaving money and valuables untouched. When questioned by the French police, Sedov asserted that the theft must have been carried out by the NKVD. He suspected that Nicolaevsky had accidentally alerted them through careless talk. In fact, Zborowski was later exposed as an NKVD agent.

Nicolaevsky is the author of the book Karl Marx: Man and Fighter, first published in German in 1933. It was translated into English by Otto Mänchen-Helfen and published in 1936. Some subsequent English editions restore the notes, appendices, and bibliography omitted from the first English edition.

Nicolaevsky also wrote "Forced Labour in Soviet Russia", with David Dallin, published in 1948, which was one of the first books to give a truthful and documented account of the scale of the USSR's labour camp system.

His other works included Power and the Soviet Elite and Aseff the Spy. He also wrote an essay "On the History of the Bolshevik Centre" and an unfinished biography of Georgy Malenkov.

Nicolaevsky emigrated to the United States in 1942, where he remained until his death, lecturing at various American universities and serving as the curator of the Hoover Institution Archives. His extensive collection of revolutionary documents is now held by the Hoover Institution Archives in Palo Alto, California.

=== Family ===
Nicolaevsky's brother, Vladimir, was married to the sister of Alexei Rykov, who was head of the Soviet government in 1924–30.

=== Death and legacy ===
Nicolaevsky died on 21 February 1966, in New York City. He was 78 years old at the time of his death. He was buried at Alta Mesa Cemetery in Palo Alto, California.
