= Life Is with People =

Book by Mark Zborowski and Elizabeth Herzog

- Cover of 1962 paperback edition
- Author: Mark Zborowski and Elizabeth Herzog
- Language: English
- Published: 1952
- Publication place: USA

Life Is with People is a book about Eastern European Jewish culture published in 1952 by Mark Zborowski and Elizabeth Herzog. Originally subtitled "The Jewish Little-Town in Eastern Europe", it was later changed to "The Culture of the Shtetl" when released in paperback in the early 1960s.

== Development and authorship ==
The book originated from a study conducted as part of the Columbia University Research in Contemporary Cultures project, headed by anthropologists Margaret Mead and Ruth Benedict. It was funded by the Office of Naval Research. The primary author was Mark Zborowski, who claimed firsthand experience of shtetl culture. Elizabeth Herzog became a co-author. It became known later that Zborowski was a Soviet spy, who was born in Uman, a town of 30,000 residents, and not in a shtetl.

Authors interviewed around one hundred Jewish emigrants in the US, asking them about shtetl life. The anthropologist Conrad M. Arensberg was the project coordinator. According to Mead, "for Conrad Arensberg, the Jewish shtetl community merged against his field of the Irish countryman and his wide sociological acquaintance with traditional rural and peasant cultures in Europe, America, and Asia". Historian Dani Schrire concludes that "the nonexistent shtetl was viewed through the lens of existing places that had few connections to the kind of life presented there".

== Content and reception ==
The book attempts to capture the essence of Eastern European Jewish culture in 400 pages, focusing on the shtetl as an idealized representation of Jewish culture. It covers various aspects of daily life including religious practices, education, work, marriages, and community dynamics. Life Is with People became highly popular, selling over 100,000 copies in several editions. It remained in print for nearly 60 years. The book was praised for its accessible prose and nostalgic portrayal of a vanished world. It influenced popular culture, including the musical Fiddler on the Roof.

Despite its popularity, the book has been criticized by some Jewish historians for presenting an overly romanticized view of Eastern European Jewish life. Steven J. Zipperstein called it "the book that Jewish historians of the region loathe more than any other". Scholars have noted inaccuracies and oversimplifications in its portrayal of shtetl life. Historian Barbara Kirshenblatt-Gimblett writes that one of the book's issues is its "identification of East European Jewish culture with the shtetl."

The book was republished in 1995; Kirshenblatt-Gimblett noted in the preface that "the work’s achievement in promoting a false image of the shtetl as a contained and secluded place ... portrayed a uniform, singular shtetl, no matter how big or small or where it was located; it was not a real, concrete place with local nuances." Dani Schrire writes that it "is not a book about Jewish life in shtetls, but a book about a generalized pre-Holocaust Jewish way of life."

Jack Kugelmass calls the book "a key text in American Jewish culture".
