= David Dallin =

Belarusian-American writer (1889–1962)

- Born: David Yulevich Levin; 1889; Rogachev, Russian Empire (now Belarus)
- Died: 1962 (aged 72–73); New York
- Occupations: writer and lecturer
- Spouses: Eugenia Bein, Lilia Estrin Dallin
- Children: Alexander Dallin

David J. Dallin (born David Yulevich Levin, Russian: Дави́д Ю́льевич Да́лин; 24 May 1889 – February 21, 1962) was a Belarusian-American one-time Menshevik leader and later a writer and lecturer on Soviet affairs, who helped Victor Kravchenko defect in the 1940s.

== Youth ==
Dallin was born in Rogachev, Russian Empire, in 1889. He studied at the University of St. Petersburg from 1907 to 1909, when he faced arrest and imprisonment for anti-tsarist political activity. After two years of imprisonment, he fled Russia to Germany. He studied at the University of Berlin and obtained his doctorate in Economics from the University of Heidelberg in 1913.

== Career ==
=== Menshevik Politician ===
Following the February Revolution of 1917, Dallin returned to the now Russian Republic (and soon to be Soviet Russia). He won election to the central committee of the Menshevik group of the Russian Social Democratic Labour Party and represented the group on the Moscow City Soviet from 1918 to 1921. The Bolsheviks arrested him a first time in 1920, and he avoided a second arrest in 1922 by fleeing back to Germany. He stayed in Germany until the Nazis forced him to leave in 1935, when he settled in Poland. He stayed in Poland until the outbreak of World War II in 1939, when he moved to the United States.

=== Kravchenko affair ===
Through a friend of his wife Lilia, Dallin came to welcome Victor Kravchenko in their home in New York in January 1944. The next day, Kravchenko revealed his wish to defect from the Soviet embassy. Dallin encouraged Kravchenko to defect. He approached the former U.S. ambassador to Russia, William C. Bullitt, whom he had known in Moscow, for advice. (Bullitt had also been involved with another Soviet defector, Walter Krivitsky.) Bullitt called Attorney General Francis Biddle and then extricated himself from the matter. Biddle brought in the FBI. In March, Dallin met Kravchenko in Pennsylvania, where the latter had an official trip. Dallin advised Kravchenko about his contact with the FBI. Kravchenko followed his advice and contacted the FBI, who interviewed him three times in Washington before the end of the month. Dallin and his wife then met Kravchenko when he arrived in New York again in April as a defector. Dallin advised Kravchenko to tell his story to The New York Times as soon as possible: Kravchenko began drafting his story that first night. The next day, Dallin brought The New York Times labor journalist Joseph Shaplen to meet Kravchenko. When Shaplen and Kravchenko did not get along, Dallin turned to a former United Press correspondent to Moscow, Eugene Lyons, by then editor of The American Mercury. He also introduced him to Isaac Don Levine and Max Eastman. (Levine had been Krivitsky's co-writer of the memoir In Stalin's Secret Service.) Lyons, Levine, and Eastman would form the core group of co-writers and co-editors of Kravchenko's best-selling memoir, I Chose Freedom; Dallin would form part of a second tier of supporters.

=== New Leader ===
Dallin joined the staff of the left-wing anti-communist magazine, The New Leader in New York, where he worked for nearly twenty years. (Founded in 1924 by the Socialist Party of America, The New Leader had come under executive editor Samuel Levitas, a Russian Menshevik, after which the magazine left the SPA but remained left-wing.) He wrote numerous books and newspaper and magazine articles on economic and political subjects, particularly Soviet affairs.

Dallin also was a visiting professor of political science at the University of Pennsylvania.

== Personal life ==
=== Family ===
Earlier in life, Dallin married a woman named Eugenia Bein. In New York, he left Eugenia and lived with Lilia Ginzberg Estrin before marrying her by 1944 (when she became known as Lilia Estrin Dallin), when the Dallins became involved in Kravchenko's defection.

Dallin and Eugenia had a son, Alexander Dallin, born overseas, who later became a prominent academic expert in Soviet studies.

=== Death ===
Dallin died in New York in 1962. He was survived by his second wife and son.

== Impact ==
As American historian John Earl Haynes Jr., has written:

Dallin and Boris Nicolaevsky's 1947 Forced Labor in Soviet Russia (New Haven: Yale University Press) had been a pioneering study of the Soviet labor camp system, well received in the academic world at the time, but again in 1960s it was retroactively discredited among most American scholars due to its use of defector testimony and Dallin's Menshevik origins. Indeed, Dallin and Nicolaevsky's 1947 book was so thoroughly erased from American academic memory that the appearance of Aleksandr Solzhenitsyn's The Gulag Archipelago in the mid-1970s came as an unexpected shock.

However, New Left academics had come to dismiss Dallin's works by the mid-1960s due to his citations of testimony from defectors and exiles plus congressional and FBI investigations, all seen as anti-communist. "Such evidence was increasingly distrusted, and Dallin's Menshevik past was taken as reason for skepticism as well," Haynes has noted.

== Works ==
- Translations of other books
  - Arbeitslohn und die soziale Entwicklung, von Dr. David Lewin (1913)
- Books in English
  - Soviet Russia's Foreign Policy 1939-1942 (1942)
  - Russia & Postwar Europe (1943)
  - The Big Three: The United States, Britain, Russia (1945)
  - Forced Labor in Soviet Russia, with Boris I. Nicolaevsky (1947, 1974)
  - Soviet Russia and the Far East (1949)
  - Economics of Slave Labor (1949)
  - The Rise of Russia in Asia (1949)
  - New Soviet Empire (1951)
  - Soviet Espionage (1955)
  - Changing World of Soviet Russia (1956)
  - Soviet Foreign Policy After Stalin (1961)
  - From Purge to Coexistence: Essays on Stalin's and Khrushchev's Russia (1964)
- Books translated into English
  - Soviet Russia's Foreign Policy, 1939–1942, translated by Leon Dennen (1942)
  - Russia and Postwar Europe, translated by F. K. Lawrence (1943)
  - Real Soviet Russia, translated by Joseph Shaplen (1944, 1947)
- Books translated into German
  - Zwangsarbeit in Sowjetrussland, with Boris I. Nikolaevsky, translated by Victor Brougmann (1947)
- Essays, Reports
  - "What Is Behind the Soviet Proposal for a Summit Conference?" Conference with Dr. David J. Dallin [and others], United States. Congress. House. Committee on Un-American Activities (1958)
  - "Mensheviks: From the Revolution of 1917 to the Second World War", edited by Leopold H. Haimson, with contributions by David Dallin et al., translated by Gertrude Vakar (1974)

== See also ==
- Lilia Estrin Dallin
- Alexander Dallin

== External sources ==
- Works by David Dallin at Faded Page (Canada)
- "David J. Dallin Papers" (PDF). New York Public Library.
- "Manuscripts, 1947-1951 (Dallin, David J., 1889-1962)". Columbia University.
- "David J. Dallin miscellaneous papers, ca. 1924-1954". Stanford University (Hoover Library).
