= Zombie Election Monitors =

Social science phenomenon

Zombie Election Monitoring (otherwise known as Shadow Observation or Zombie Observation) is a term given to a low-credibility election monitor, in the study of social science, and as developed by Christopher Walker and Alexander Cooley and further expanded by Sarah Sunn Bush and Lauren Prather, which relates to how authoritarian regimes can create artificial electoral legitimacy. The phenomenon has been used to describe elections in Myanmar, Cambodia, China, Russia, Iran, Saudi Arabia, and Venezuela. Early examples were also analysed in Uzbekistan, Tajikistan, and Azerbaijan.

Daxecher and Schneider further expanded the analysis to argue that a mix of reviews can further bolster legitimacy. Thailand took the step in 2018 to ban Election Monitors, even would be shadow observers, which Lee Morgenbesser described as "unusual", given the authoritarian impulse to derive at least nominal legitimacy by commissioning sympathetic monitors.
