= Dorothy Atkinson (historian) =

American historian (1929–2016)

- Born: Dorothy Grace Gillis; August 5, 1929; Malden, Massachusetts
- Died: January 23, 2016 (aged 86); Palo Alto, California
- Occupation: Historian

Academic background
- Education: Stanford University

Academic work
- Discipline: Russian history

Dorothy Grace Atkinson (née Gillis; August 5, 1929 – January 23, 2016) was an American historian who specialized in Russian history.

== Personal life ==
Atkinson was of Scottish and Italian ancestry. Her father was a labor union leader, while her mother was a homemaker. She had six brothers.

Atkinson was the first in her family to attend college. Atkinson studied history at Barnard College and graduated in 1951. She and her husband, Stewart, then moved to California so Atkinson could obtain a graduate degree from the University of California, Berkeley. After obtaining the degree, Atkinson paused her career to raise two children. In 1971, she earned her Ph.D from Stanford University.

== Career ==
Atkinson served as an assistant professor of Russian history at Stanford University from 1973 to 1982. One of her graduate students described Atkinson's teaching style as "engaged and engaging, demanding but kind (a rarity at Stanford at that time)". Another former student noted Atkinson's importance in breaking down barriers for young women in academia in the 1970s.

At Stanford, Atkinson was director of the university's Summer Institute for Soviet and East European Studies, holding that post from 1983 until 1986. The Stanford University Press published two of her books on Russian history, one of them a co-edited work with Alexander Dallin and Gail Warshofky. During her career, she also wrote dozens of journal articles, book chapters, and reviews.

From 1981 until her retirement in 1995, Atkinson served as executive director of the Association for Slavic, East European, and Eurasian Studies (ASEEES), taking control of a nearly bankrupt organization that had resulted from a decade of financial mismanagement. Under her leadership, the ASEEES achieved financial solvency, doubled its membership, and increased its international profile.

== Publications ==
Adapted from:

- Women in Russia. Stanford University Press. 1977. Co-edited with Alexander Dallin and Gail Warshofky
- The End of the Russian Land Commune, 1905–1930. Stanford University Press. 1983.
