= Harriman Institute =

Academic institution at Columbia University

Coordinates: 40.80774°N 73.95972°W

- Named after: W. Averell Harriman
- Formation: 1946
- Location: New York City, New York, U.S.
- Director: Valentina Izmirlieva
- Parent organization: Columbia University
- Website: harriman.columbia.edu

The Harriman Institute, the first academic center in the United States devoted to the interdisciplinary study of Russia and the Soviet Union, was founded at Columbia University in 1946, with the support of the Rockefeller Foundation, as the Russian Institute.

== History ==
The goals of the new regional institute, as stated in the proposal to the Rockefeller Foundation, were viewed to be twofold: “First, the direct advancement of knowledge in the Russian field through the coordinated research work of faculty and students; and secondly, the training of these students… as American specialists who will subsequently do work of authority and influence in the Russian field.” Although the Institute’s geographical purview has grown to encompass the post-Soviet states and the post-socialist Eastern European states, the Institute has remained true to its overall objectives of teaching and research.

In 1982, the Russian Institute became the W. Averell Harriman Institute for the Advanced Study of the Soviet Union, in recognition both of Governor Harriman’s generous endowment of the Institute and his lifetime of distinguished service. As Governor Harriman stated in the announcement of the establishment of the Harriman Institute: “My objective is very clear: I want to stimulate and encourage the advanced study of Soviet affairs. To base policy on ignorance and illusion is very dangerous. Policy should be based on knowledge and understanding.”

In 1992, following the collapse of the USSR, the Institute officially expanded its focus to encompass all the states of the former Soviet Union and Eastern Europe and adopted the name of the Harriman Institute. In 1997, the Harriman and East Central European Institutes united to promote comparative scholarly knowledge and public understanding of the complex and changing polities, economies, societies, and cultures of the area between Germany and the Pacific Ocean.

== Directors ==
Past directors of the Harriman Institute Include:

- Geroid T. Robinson, 1946–51
- Philip E. Mosely, 1951–55
- Henry L. Roberts, 1956–62
- Alexander Dallin, 1962–67
- Marshall D. Shulman, 1967–74, ’76–77, ’81–86
- William E. Harkins, 1974–76, ‘80–81
- Robert L. Belknap, 1977–80
- Robert Legvold, 1986–92
- Richard E. Ericson, 1992–95
- Mark L. von Hagen, 1995–2001
- Catharine Theimer Nepomnyashchy, 2001–2009 (on leave 2006–07)
- Jack Snyder (Acting Director), 2006–07
- Timothy M. Frye, 2009-2015 (on leave 2012–13)
- Kimberly J. Marten (Acting Director), 2012–13
- Alexander Cooley, 2015–2021
- Valentina Izmirlieva, 2022–

== See also ==
- Marshall D. Shulman
- John N. Hazard
