= Mark von Hagen =

American historian (1954–2019)

- Born: Mark Louis von Hagen; July 21, 1954; Cincinnati, Ohio, U.S.
- Died: September 15, 2019 (aged 65); Phoenix, Arizona, U.S.
- Education: Georgetown University; Indiana University Bloomington; Stanford University
- Occupation: Military historian
- Spouse: Johnny Roldan-Chacon (m. 2013–2019)

Mark Louis von Hagen (July 21, 1954 – September 15, 2019) was an American military historian who taught Russian, Ukrainian, and Eurasian history at Arizona State University. He was formerly at Columbia University. He was commissioned by The New York Times to write an independent assessment of Times correspondent Walter Duranty and his reporting on the Soviet Union after the newspaper received a letter from the Pulitzer Prize Board regarding allegations of Duranty's role in the cover-up of the Holodomor in Soviet Ukraine.

== Education and career ==
Born in Cincinnati, Ohio to Daniel von Hagen (February 29, 1924 – August 7, 2019), a high school history teacher, and Martha (Kastner) von Hagen (d. 2013), Mark von Hagen and his brother, Luke, were raised in Colorado.

Von Hagen was educated at Georgetown University, Indiana University-Bloomington, and Stanford University, where he received his Ph.D. He has also taught at Stanford University, Yale University, the Free University of Berlin, and the Ecole des Hautes Etudes en Sciences Sociales (Paris). He served as associate director and then Director of the Harriman Institute (1989–2001). In the School of International and Public Affairs at Columbia, he chaired the task force on review of the school's curriculum, headed its Inter-regional Council, and served as director of the master's program in international affairs.

He served on the editorial boards of Ab Imperio, and Kritika. Von Hagen served on several professional association boards (the National Council for Eurasian and East European Studies, the American Association for the Advancement of Slavic Studies, and the Association for the Study of Nationalities, among others). He also was a member of the Council on Foreign Relations and the Human Rights Watch Eurasia Steering Committee. He served as a consultant for the Russian Archives Project of Primary Source Microfilms (Gale Group). From 2002 to 2005, Von Hagen was president of the International Association for Ukrainian Studies.

Hagen served as the Emeritus Professor of history and global studies with a joint appointment in the School of History, Philosophy and Religious Studies and School of International Letters and Cultures in the College of Liberal Arts and Sciences at Arizona State University. He also was the founding director of the Office for Veteran and Military Academic Engagement at Arizona State University.

He wrote Soldiers in the Proletarian Dictatorship: The Red Army and the Soviet Socialist State, 1917-1930 (Cornell, 1990) and War in a European Borderland: Occupations and Occupation Plans in Galicia and Ukraine, 1914-1918 (U of Washington Press, 2007); was co-editor (with Andreas Kappeler, Zenon Kohut and Frank Sysyn) of Culture, Nation, Identity: the Ukrainian-Russian Encounter, 1600-1945 (Toronto, 2003); and co-edited (with Jane Burbank and Anatoly Remnev) the title Geographies of Empire: Ruling Russia, 1700-1991 (Indiana, 2004). He wrote articles and essays on topics in historiography, civil-military relations, nationality politics and minority history, and cultural history.

== Walter Duranty investigation ==
In 2003, The New York Times commissioned Von Hagen to study Duranty's role in covering up genocide in Ukraine. He reported that "after reading through a good portion of Duranty's reporting for 1931, I was disappointed and disturbed by the overall picture he painted of the Soviet Union for that period...but after reading so much of Duranty in 1931 it is far less surprising to me that he would deny in print the famine of 1932-1933." The results of the study led him to call for Duranty's Pulitzer Prize to be revoked, remarking to the press that "for the sake of The New York Times' honor, they should take the prize away."

Asked if his opinion of Duranty's reporting would change if he were to examine only those 13 articles for which Duranty won the Pulitzer Prize, Dr. von Hagen replied with a resolute no. The reporting for which he won the Pulitzer Prize was "quintessential of the problems of Mr. Duranty's analysis," Dr. von Hagen said. The professor said that Duranty's award "diminishes the prize's value."

== Personal life ==
Von Hagen married Johnny Roldan-Chacon on October 15, 2013, in California. He died in 2019 after an extended illness.
