= History of Eastern Europe =

History of the eastern part of Europe

The history of Eastern Europe is the history of the eastern part of the European continent from the arrival of modern humans to the present. It concerns the lands of East-Central Europe, the Baltic, Belarus, Ukraine, European Russia, Romania and Moldova, and in part the Balkans. Much of the region lies on the East European Plain, whose southern edge forms the western end of the Eurasian Steppe, an open grassland along which many peoples moved westward into Europe. The meaning of the name has changed over time, and authors and institutions still draw the region's limits in different ways.

Modern humans were present in the region by about 40,000 years ago. Farming reached the Balkans from Anatolia in the 7th millennium BC, and herders of the Yamnaya culture spread across the steppe from about 3300 BC, in migrations that many scholars link to the spread of the Indo-European languages. In antiquity Greek cities lined the Black Sea coast, Scythians and later Sarmatians lived on the steppe, and Rome held the Danube frontier and conquered Dacia in 106. In 330 Constantine dedicated Constantinople as the new capital of the empire.

The arrival of the Huns in 375 opened the Migration Period, in which Avars, Bulgars and Slavs settled the region. Bulgaria, Kievan Rus', Poland, Bohemia and Hungary took shape as states between the 7th and the 11th centuries and accepted Christianity from Rome or Constantinople. The Mongols conquered the Rus' principalities by 1240, and Moscow later rose under the overlordship of the Golden Horde. Poland and Lithuania were joined by a royal marriage in 1386, while the Ottoman Turks conquered the Balkans between the mid-14th and the late 15th centuries.

== Geography and terminology ==
The East European Plain (shaded), the largest landform of Eastern Europe

The largest landform of Eastern Europe is the East European Plain, a region of broad river basins that covers nearly 4,000,000 square kilometres (1,500,000 sq mi) at an average height of about 170 metres (560 ft). Along its southern edge runs the western part of the Eurasian Steppe, a grassland belt that stretches some 8,000 kilometres (5,000 mi) from Hungary to Manchuria. Ukraine and the neighbouring parts of Romania offer far better grazing than the lands further east, so steppe peoples in the west tended to move westward along the grassland when the political situation let them. The lands north of the Black Sea were divided between steppe and forest-steppe zones, while the Pripet Marshes, among the largest wetlands in Europe, cover southern Belarus and northern Ukraine.

The Carpathian Mountains form an arc some 1,450 kilometres (900 mi) long, running from the Danube near Bratislava to Orșova in Romania. The Danube, the second-longest river in Europe after the Volga, flows about 2,850 kilometres (1,770 mi) from the Black Forest to the Black Sea and shaped the settlement and political history of Central and Southeastern Europe. Ancient writers told of large amounts of amber cast ashore on an "island" that was most likely the eastern coast of the Baltic Sea, and the 11th-century chronicler Adam of Bremen seems to have been the first to use the name Mare Balticum.

The Balkan Peninsula takes its name from a Turkish word for mountain. The Balkan Mountains run east to west across Bulgaria, the Rhodope Mountains follow the border between Bulgaria and Greece, and the Dinaric range stretches along the Adriatic coast to Albania. Good farmland is scarce between the ranges, apart from the valleys of the Danube, the Sava and the Vardar and the Danubian Plain. The north and centre of the peninsula have cold winters and warm summers, while the south and the coasts have a Mediterranean climate. In the north the Pannonian Basin and its Great Hungarian Plain extend from Central Europe into Croatia, Serbia and Romania, which makes the northern limit of the Balkans hard to draw.

The meaning of "Eastern Europe" has changed over time, and the equivalent terms carry different meanings in different European languages. In the Cold War era, Western political usage treated "Eastern Europe" and "Eastern Bloc" as near synonyms. According to the historian Frithjof Benjamin Schenk, the countries of Central Europe escaped this politically defined Eastern Europe after 1989, although the idea of an Eastern Europe kept its place on Europe's mental maps. The United Nations Statistics Division places ten countries in Eastern Europe in its publications, namely Belarus, Bulgaria, the Czech Republic, Hungary, Moldova, Poland, Romania, Russia, Slovakia and Ukraine. It assigns the Baltic states to Northern Europe, and Albania and the former Yugoslav republics to Southern Europe.

== Prehistory (to c. 800 BC) ==
=== Hunter-gatherers and the first farmers ===
Sandstone sculptures from Lepenski Vir in the Iron Gates gorges of the Danube

The Kostenki complex of Upper Palaeolithic sites in European Russia provides high-quality evidence for the arrival of early modern humans in Eastern Europe, with tool assemblages related to the Aurignacian culture dating to about 41,000–37,000 years ago. In the Mesolithic, hunter-gatherers settled extensively in the Iron Gates gorges of the Danube, between present-day Serbia and Romania. Lepenski Vir stands out as the only site in the gorges with solid, lasting buildings that held sculptures and other symbolic objects. The gorges were poorly suited to agriculture, but their inhabitants were in contact with farming groups from before 6300 BC, and pottery of the early farming Starčevo culture appears at Lepenski Vir. The archaeologist Ivana Radovanović describes the relationship as non-hostile and fully cooperative, although she sees the continued use of sites such as Lepenski Vir as a sign of "symbolic conflict" with the farmers. In the eastern Baltic, hunter-gatherers of the Kunda and later Narva cultures continued to live mainly by foraging until at least 4000 BC.

Farming was introduced to Europe in the mid-7th millennium BC by migrants from Anatolia who settled first in the southeast. From about 6250 BC it spread rapidly through the Balkans to the southern edge of the Carpathian Basin and southern Transylvania, where the farming frontier halted for 400–500 years. The early farmers of the northern Balkans were overwhelmingly of Aegean and Anatolian ancestry. In Transdanubia, in present-day western Hungary, the Linear Pottery culture grew out of the late Starčevo culture in the mid-6th millennium BC. By about 5350 BC it had spread west to the Rhine and north into central Poland, and less than 300 years later it reached Normandy and Ukraine. The archaeologist Stephen Shennan explains this spread as a demographic expansion of farmers from the southeast, noting that the local hunter-gatherers lived at very low densities.

=== Copper Age ===
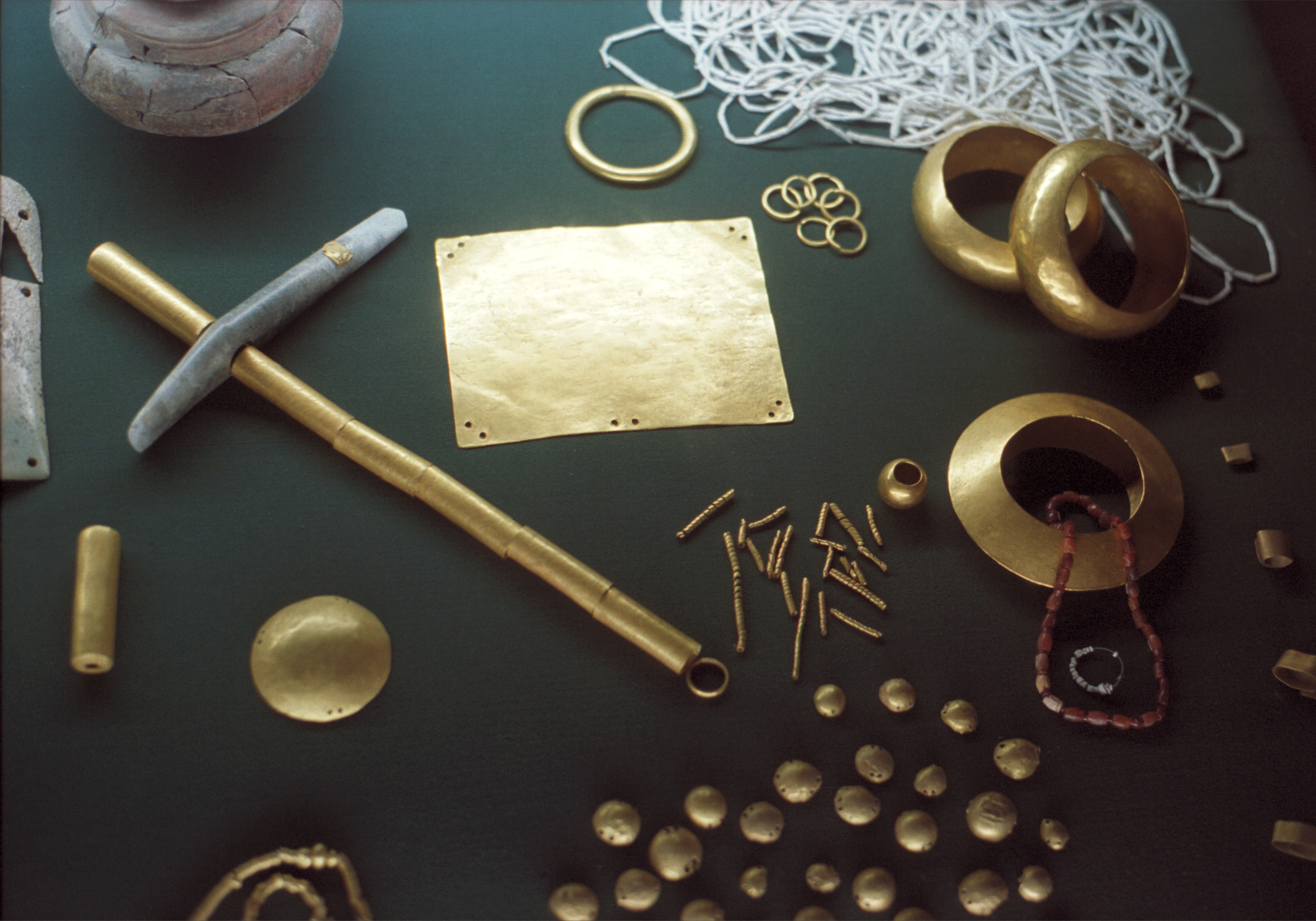
Gold objects from the Copper Age cemetery at Varna, in the Varna Archaeological Museum

Southeastern Europe saw the invention of gold metallurgy during the Copper Age. The cemetery at Varna in Bulgaria, in use from about 4560 to 4450 BC, contained gold objects made by the earliest fine metalworkers known so far. Its few lavish graves have been interpreted as the burials of a handful of paramount chiefs over 50 to 60 years, a sign that a new social structure had stabilized. Settlements of the Cucuteni–Trypillia culture extended from the Carpathian foothills to the Dnieper. From about 4100 BC its communities between the Southern Bug and the Dnieper built "mega-sites" with thousands of houses, such as Maidanetske in Ukraine, which covered about 200 hectares. Scholars have seen them as anything from early towns with a stratified society to pilgrimage sites used only in certain seasons. The archaeologist Robert Hofmann and his colleagues interpret their large public buildings as places for ritual and joint decision-making, of a kind known from societies without ranks. They suggest that power later passed to a central institution, and that resistance to this may have contributed to the break-up of the mega-sites around 3600 BC.

=== Steppe herders and the Bronze Age ===
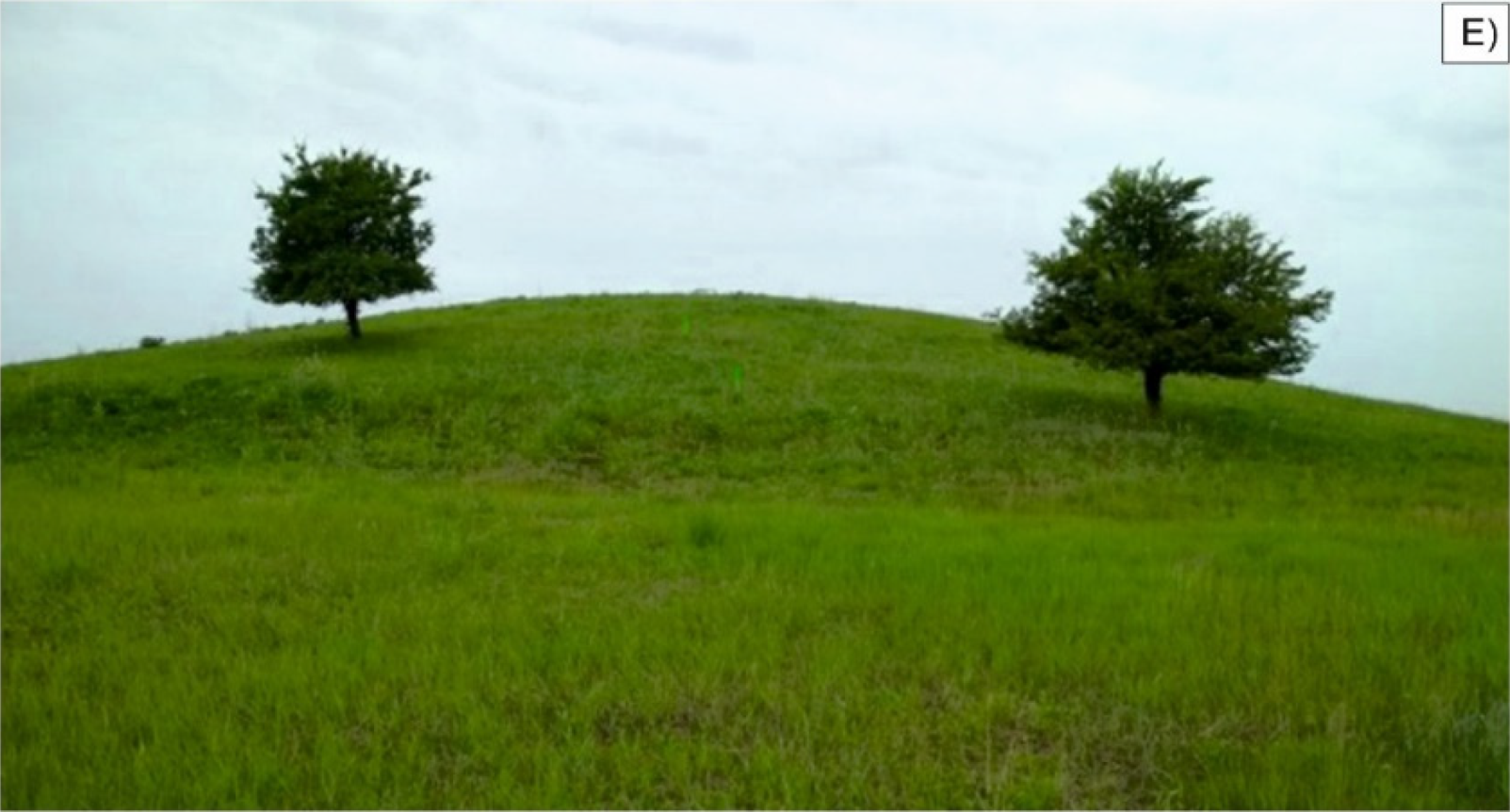
A Yamnaya burial mound (kurgan) in Hungary

The Yamnaya culture appeared around 3300 BC across the steppes north of the Black and Caspian seas. Its people developed the first fully pastoral economy, used wagons as mobile homes and built lines of barrows (kurgans) that marked seasonal routes. From around 3000 BC the culture expanded, reaching eastern Central Europe. Ancient DNA studies show that steppe ancestry, best represented by the Yamnaya, reached central and northern Europe in the 3rd millennium BC with the Corded Ware culture. Kristian Kristiansen and his co-authors suggest that the migrating groups consisted mainly of men and practised exogamy. In southeastern Europe, intermittent genetic contact with steppe populations began up to 2,000 years before these migrations.

These findings renewed the debate on the origin of the Indo-European languages. Kristiansen and his co-authors concluded that the Indo-European languages which came to dominate western Eurasia spread with the steppe migrations of the 3rd millennium BC, and that the rival Anatolian hypothesis "must be considered largely falsified". A 2025 study led by Iosif Lazaridis proposed that the "final unity" of the speakers of "proto-Indo-Anatolian" occurred among people of the Caucasus and Lower Volga region between 4400 and 4000 BC. Other archaeologists have questioned how such results are presented. Martin Furholt argued that narratives of "massive migrations" once again equate archaeological cultures with human populations, and that the genetic turnover did not require a single mass migration.

In the later Bronze Age the Urnfield culture, named after its custom of placing the cremated remains of the dead in urns, appeared in East-Central Europe. From the 12th century BC its urn cemeteries spread as far as Ukraine. In the eastern Baltic, genomes of Bronze Age people from Latvia and Lithuania, dated between about 1230 and 230 BC, carry more ancestry from the region's earlier hunter-gatherers than Late Neolithic genomes do.

== Antiquity (c. 800 BC – AD 375) ==
=== Greek colonies and steppe peoples ===
Ruins of the Greek colony of Istros (Histria) near the Black Sea coast of Romania

Miletus founded Istros (Histria) on the western Black Sea coast in the mid-7th century BC. Milesian settlers also founded Tyras on the lower Dniester, and Olbia traced its origin to Miletus. The archaeologist Alexandru Avram envisages peaceful cohabitation between the Greeks of Istros and the native Getae in the Archaic period. The Scythians of the steppe practised a nomadic and semi-nomadic cattle-breeding economy, and their highest nobility was buried in royal barrows. The Greek historian Herodotus, who travelled in their country, long remained the main written source on them, and the excavation of their kurgans has since added much to his account. They were early masters of horse riding and were feared for their skill in war. In about 513/512 BC the Persian king Darius I crossed the Bosporus and the Danube on a campaign against the Scythians. After their victory over Darius the Scythians are believed to have established a protectorate over the Greek cities north of the sea.

Historians long held that the Sarmatians invaded Scythia around 300 BC and became rulers of the north Pontic region, a view the archaeologist Valentina Mordvintseva calls the "Sarmatian paradigm". She argues that no great migration from the east in the 3rd and 2nd centuries BC is attested archaeologically, and that the invasion model rests on a doubtful reading of fragmentary written sources. Sarmatian groups later pressed on Roman territory, entering the province of Lower Moesia in the reign of Nero.

=== Thracians, Illyrians and Celts ===
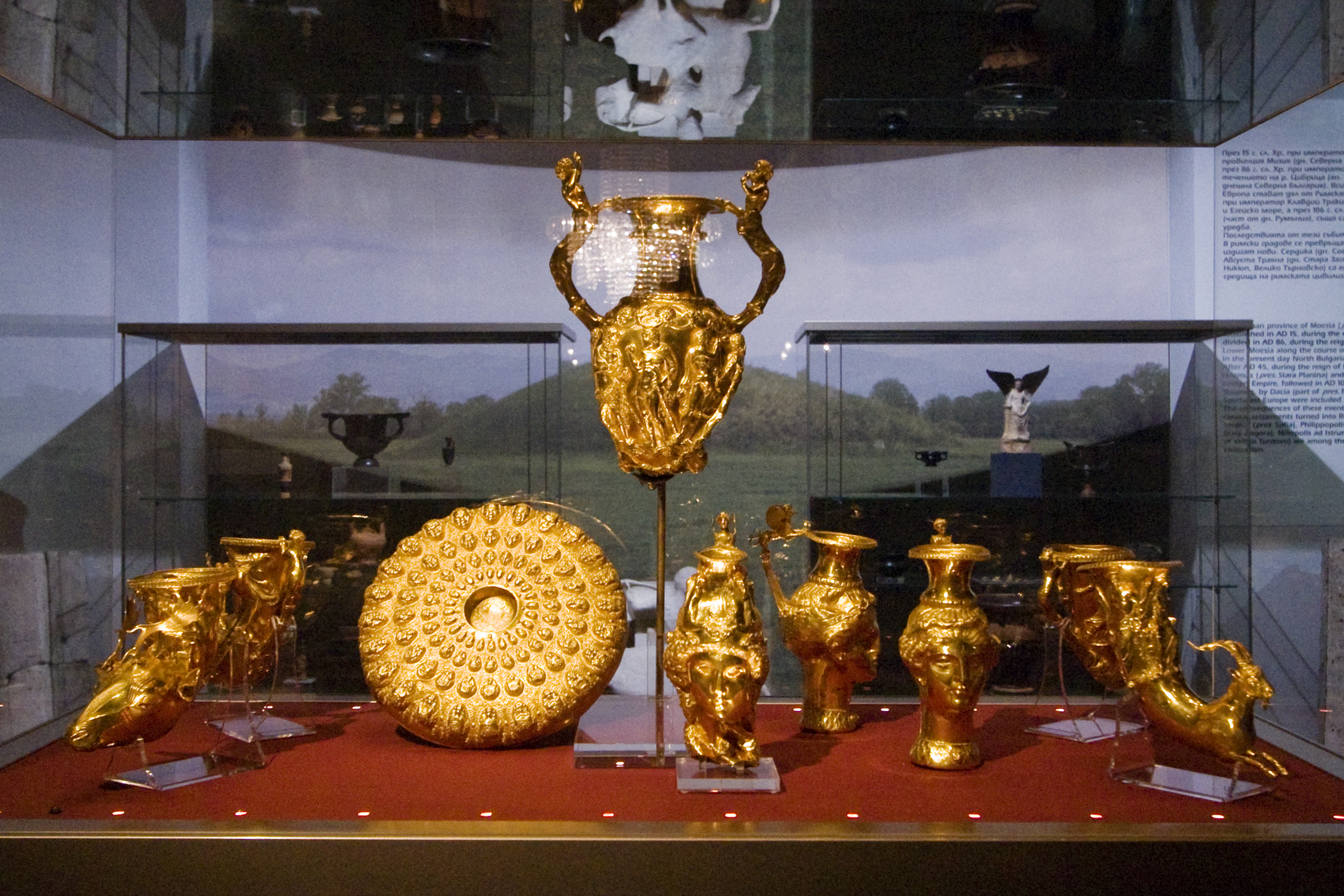
The Thracian gold treasure from Panagyurishte in Bulgaria, found in 1949

The Thracians, who lived south of the lower Danube, were known by many names in different regions. Darius I conquered Thrace during his Scythian campaign and installed Persian governors there, although historians disagree on whether it formed a separate satrapy. Teres, the first identifiable king of the Odrysians of the fertile Upper Thracian Plain, was regarded by Thucydides as the founder of the Odrysian kingdom. After the death of King Kotys I the kingdom split into three parts, and the Macedonians conquered Thrace in 342/341 BC.

In the western Balkans the name Illyrians, first recorded by Hecataeus and Herodotus, referred from the outset to a league of peoples. An Illyrian kingdom ruled by Agron and then by Teuta as regent came into conflict with Rome, which fought three Illyrian Wars between 229 and 168 BC. The capture of King Gentius in the last of them marked the beginning of Roman dominion in the region. Celtic peoples also lived along the Danube. The Boii gave their name to Bohemia. Those living south of the Danube were destroyed by the Dacian king Burebista around 50 BC, and those in Bohemia were expelled by the Marcomanni in 8 BC.

=== Rome and the Danube frontier ===
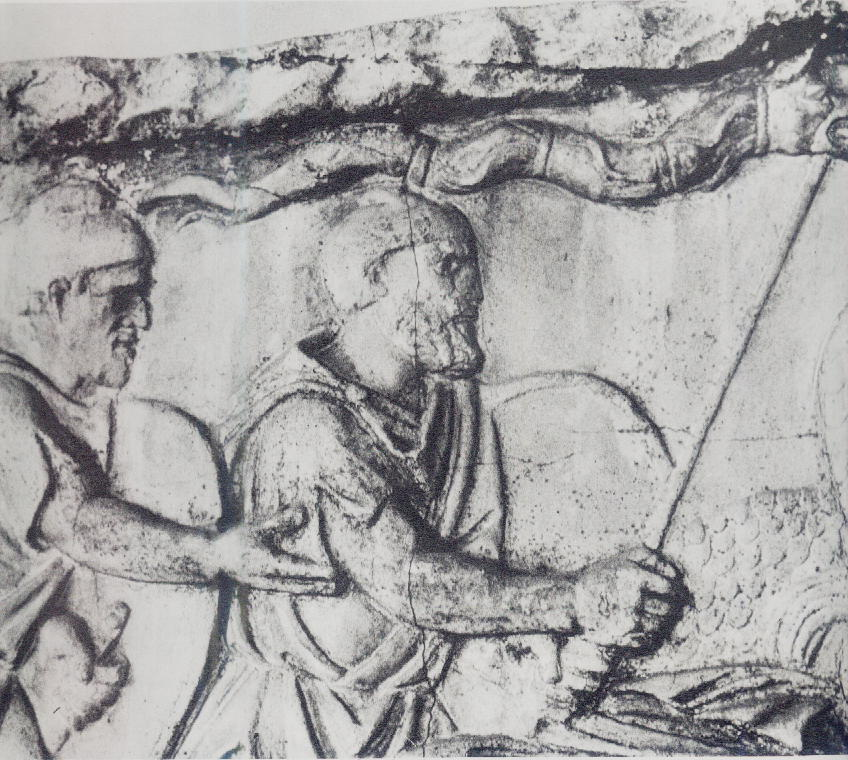
Dacian warriors with their draco standard on Trajan's Column in Rome, which commemorates the Dacian Wars

In 29–28 BC the Romans under Marcus Licinius Crassus annexed the Greek cities of Histria, Tomis and Kallatis on the coast of the Dobruja. Further west, Octavian's campaigns in Illyricum in 35–33 BC, Tiberius's Pannonian war of 11–9 BC and the suppression of the Pannonian–Dalmatian rebellion of AD 6–9 extended Roman rule to the Danube. When Claudius suppressed the Thracian kingdom in AD 46, its lands south of the Balkan Mountains became the province of Thracia and those between the mountains and the Danube were added to Moesia.

North of the river, the Dacians, closely akin to the Getae, were united around 60–50 BC by Burebista, whose kingdom broke into at least four parts after his assassination. Reunited under Decebalus, the Dacians raided Moesia in AD 85. Trajan invaded in 101 and, after a second war in 105–106, conquered the kingdom, killing or driving north much of its population. The province of Dacia was formally established by 108 at the latest. The long peace on the lower Danube ended around 238, when the Carpi and the Goths attacked, and the frontier suffered nine Gothic invasions by 269. Rome gave up Dacia, probably because troops were needed south of the Danube. The withdrawal is usually dated to the reign of Aurelian (270–275), although David Breeze and his co-authors place it in the 260s.

Pannonia became a province of its own in AD 9, held by three legions, and Trajan divided it around 106. Roman ways spread quickly in its western part, where Emona and Savaria became Roman colonies in the 1st century. Upper Pannonia bore the brunt of the Marcomannic Wars under Marcus Aurelius, who died at Vindobona in 180. Several 3rd-century emperors were born in the province, which also sent many recruits to the army. Constantine the Great, born at Naissus in Moesia, made Byzantium his permanent capital, enlarged it and dedicated it as Constantinople in May 330. The dedication sealed a separation between the emperors and the city of Rome that had been under way for more than a century.

The Bastarnae, who lived on the lower Danube in the 1st century AD, are generally regarded as a Germanic people. According to the 6th-century historian Jordanes, the Goths came from southern Scandinavia and in the later 2nd century moved south from the Vistula region to the Black Sea. The Goths west of the Dniester, as far as the Danube, came to be called Visigoths, and those in present-day Ukraine Ostrogoths. By the late 3rd century the Gepids had settled in the mountains to the north of Transylvania, and the Vandals lived to their west. Among the Goths north of the Danube, Ulfilas, consecrated as their bishop in 341, spread an Arian form of Christianity and translated much of the Bible into Gothic, in an alphabet he is said to have devised. Their Arian Christianity later set the Goths apart from the Roman Empire. Under King Ermanaric the Ostrogothic realm stretched from the Don to the Dniester, until the Huns subjugated it in the 370s.

Further north the Balts, whom Tacitus called the Aestii, lived on the southeastern shores of the Baltic. Alissa Mittnik and her co-authors suggest that ancestry related to Siberian and East Asian populations reached Estonia after the Bronze Age, around 500 BC. It has been linked to the spread from the east of speakers of Uralic languages, which include Finnish and Estonian.

== Migration Period and Early Middle Ages (375–c. 1000) ==
=== Huns, Goths, Avars and the Byzantine frontier ===
Gold bowl from the Nagyszentmiklós treasure, made between the 7th and 9th centuries

Historians often date the beginning of the Migration Period in Eastern Europe to the arrival of the Huns north of the Black Sea in 375. Gothic troops defeated the Roman emperor Valens at the Battle of Adrianople in 378. Under Attila the Huns exacted growing tributes from the Roman Empire, but their empire collapsed after his death in 453. The western provinces turned into a mosaic of Germanic kingdoms, but the Eastern Roman or Byzantine Empire survived, and its population called itself Rhomaioi, or Romans. In the 6th century Justinian I carried out a fortification programme on the Danube frontier, directed against rapid raids by horsemen.

The Avars reached the steppe north of the Caucasus in 557 and in 568 founded a khaganate in the Carpathian Basin, as heirs to the Hunnic empire. In 626 the Avars besieged Constantinople itself. Around 680 groups of Bulgars moved to the lower Danube and occupied lands on both banks of the river. The Avar khaganate collapsed after Frankish campaigns under Charlemagne around 800.

=== Slavic expansion ===
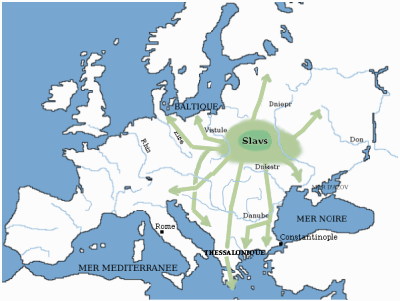
One reconstruction of the spread of Slavic-speaking groups between the 5th and 10th centuries

Slavic-speaking peoples appear in written sources in the 6th century. From then on they spread west as far as the Elbe and the Saale, south into Bohemia, Moravia, the Carpathian Basin and the Balkans, and north up the Dnieper. Byzantine writers knew the Slavs on their Danube frontier as Sclaveni and Antes, and the Sclaveni are first recorded there around 520. Archaeologists link the early Slavs with the Prague–Korchak group, a simple material culture of small sunken-floored houses, cremation burials and plain handmade pottery.

According to the Byzantine historian Procopius, Huns, Sclaveni and Antes overran Illyricum and Thrace "practically every year" from the beginning of Justinian's reign. Complaining in his Secret History that Justinian still refused to remit taxes, Procopius described what the raids had done in Europe.

... the Huns and Slavs [had ravaged] all of Europe; captured cities had either been razed to their foundations, or made to pay terrible tribute; men had been carried off into slavery together with all their property, and every district had been deserted by its inhabitants because of the daily raids ...

Writing in the 580s, the church historian John of Ephesus described how the Slavs "overran the whole of Greece, and the country of the Thessalonians, and all Thrace", took cities and forts and settled in the land, where they stayed because the emperor had sent his armies east against Persia. Slavic groups attacked Thessalonica in 586 and again in 677 and settled across the Balkans as far as the southern Peloponnese. The Byzantinist Johannes Koder regards this as the population movement most relevant to the present ethnic make-up of Southeastern Europe.

In 623 or 624 the Slavs on the western edge of the Avar realm rose against the Avars and made Samo, a merchant of Frankish origin, their king. When the Frankish king Dagobert I attacked them in the early 630s, his main army was heavily defeated at Wogastisburg. Further east, the Slavs had become the dominant people of the East European Plain by about 600. The East Slavs settled along the Dnieper and from there moved north to the upper Volga valley, east of present-day Moscow, and west towards the Dniester and the western Bug. Among them, tribes such as the Polianians, Siverianians, Derevlianians and Volhynians later emerged from the earlier Antes and Sclaveni confederations.

How the Slavic languages came to be spoken over so wide an area has long been debated. The traditional view holds that the Slavs migrated from a homeland somewhere in Eastern Europe, although its proponents disagree on where it lay. Some scholars have instead proposed that existing populations were Slavicized. The historian Florin Curta, for example, doubts that Slavic groups crossed the Danube in large numbers as early as the 6th century, and argues that these groups became "Slavs" because the Byzantines called them so, not because of the language they spoke. A 2025 ancient DNA study of 555 individuals, however, linked the spread of the Slavs with large-scale migration. It found that people moving from Eastern Europe between the 6th and 8th centuries replaced more than four-fifths of the earlier gene pool in eastern Germany, Poland and Croatia. Its authors also found marked regional differences, and noted that genetic evidence from the early Slavic settlement is scarce because the dead were often cremated.

=== Early states ===
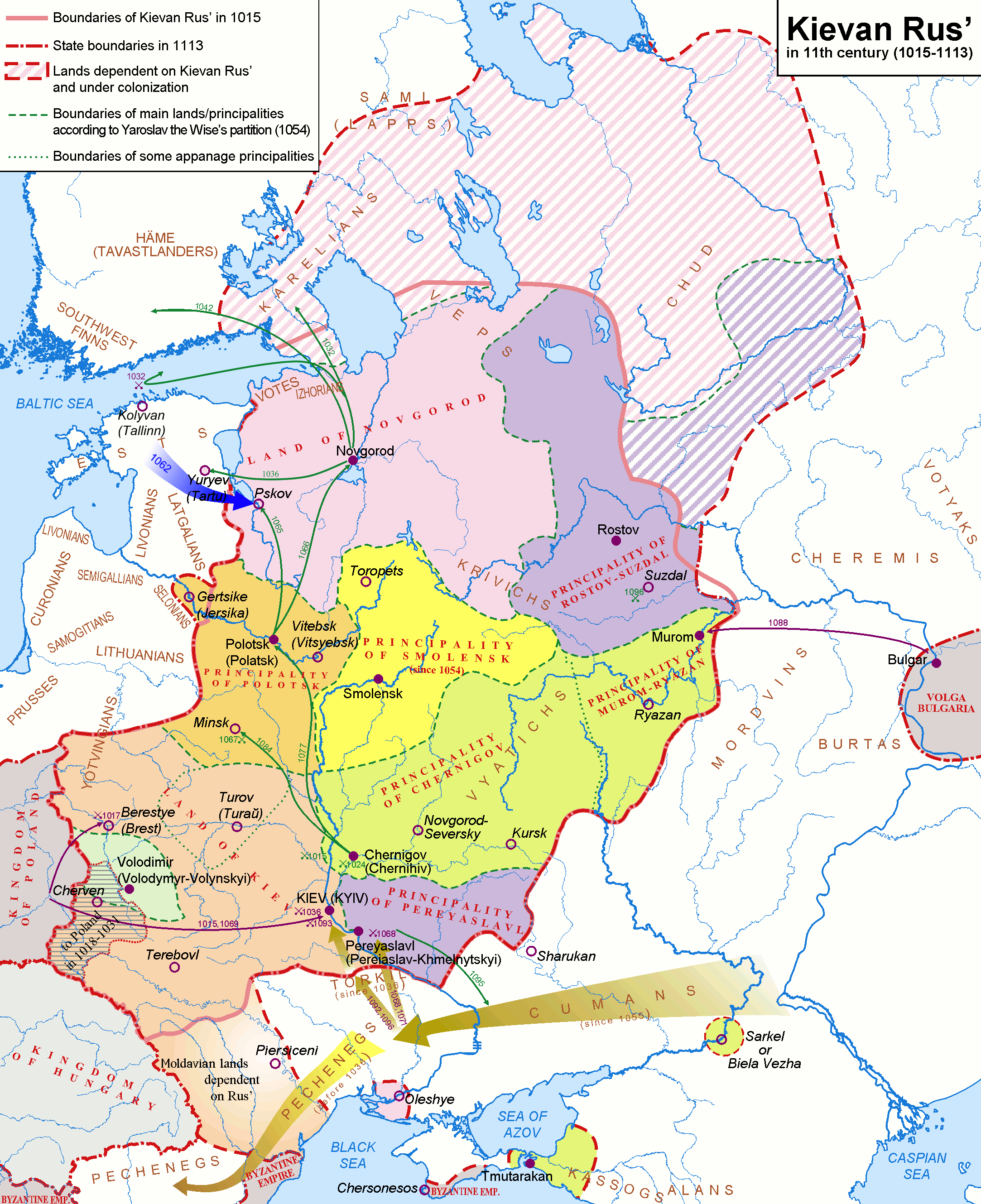
Kievan Rus' between 1015 and 1113

On the steppe north of the Black Sea a Khazar empire emerged around 660, and its elite converted to Judaism around 800. In the 8th and 9th centuries many East Slavic tribes paid tribute to the Khazars. On the lower Danube the Bulgar khanate grew into a Balkan power. Khan Krum defeated the Byzantine emperor Nikephoros I in 811, and Symeon I proclaimed himself basileus, or emperor, around 913. The peace of 927 arranged the marriage of his successor Peter I to Maria Lekapene, daughter of Christopher Lekapenos, probably recognized Peter's imperial title, and allowed the head of the Bulgarian church to bear the title of patriarch. After an invasion by the Rus' prince Sviatoslav I, the emperor John I Tzimiskes took Preslav in 971 and began to bring the Bulgarian lands under direct imperial rule. The Byzantine conquest of the Bulgarian Empire followed between 1014 and 1018.

Further north, Scandinavians known as Varangians or Rus' are first recorded in Constantinople in 839. Travelling along the rivers of Eastern Europe, they founded the Rus' principalities together with local Slavic groups, and in 881 or 882 Oleg united the principalities of Novgorod and Kyiv. According to the historian Arsenii Nasonov, the name "Rus' Land" first referred to the area around Kyiv, Chernihiv and Pereiaslav, and it was later extended to all the East Slavic lands ruled by the descendants of Volodimer (Vladimir), although some historians consider the broader meaning older. In 963–965 Sviatoslav took the Khazar cities of Sarkel and Itil, and the Khazar empire collapsed.

In the western Balkans, according to the 10th-century emperor Constantine VII, Croats and Serbs settled after the Avar conquest of Dalmatia. Northern Dalmatia came under the Carolingian Empire, while the coastal towns stayed with Byzantium. North of the Danube, Great Moravia flourished in the 9th century under the dukes Rostislav and Svatopluk, with large centres at Mikulčice, Staré Město and Pohansko. It disappeared around 900, when the Hungarians took control of Central Europe. Czech historians long regarded it as the first fully developed Slavic state, but the archaeologist Jiří Macháček argues that its economy and settlement pattern fit better with a chiefdom "in its most developed form". The Hungarians moved into the Carpathian Basin in 896–900 under pressure from the Pechenegs and raided Central and Western Europe and Italy until 955. Under Prince Géza the Árpád dynasty established its rule.

=== Christianization ===
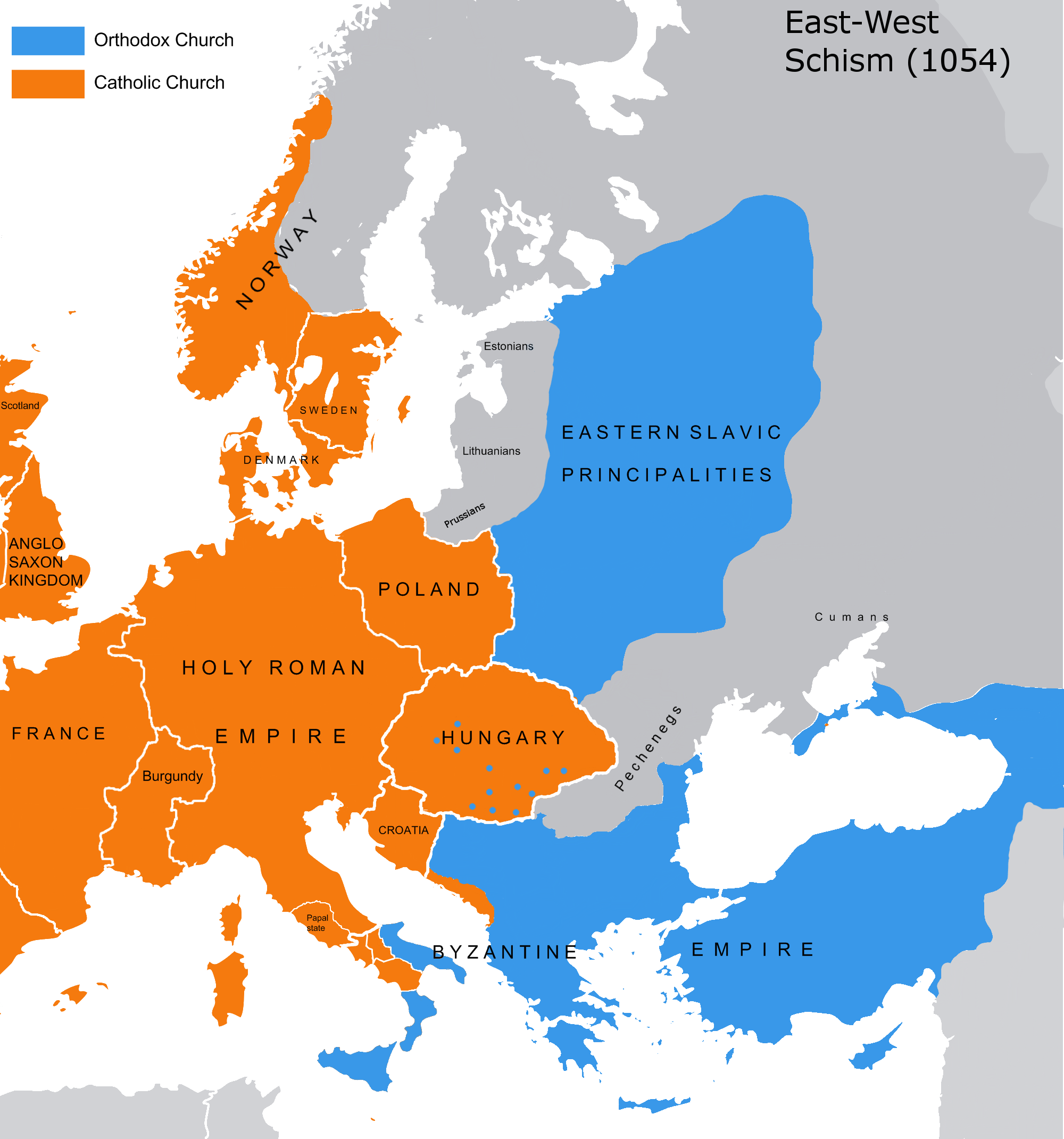
Latin and Greek Christianity at the time of the East–West Schism of 1054

In 863 the Byzantine brothers Constantine (later Cyril) and Methodius began a mission to Great Moravia. They brought a newly invented Slavic alphabet, and Old Church Slavonic was created as a written language in the mid-860s. The Moravian church was divided between supporters of the Slavonic and of the Frankish Latin liturgy, and in the mid-880s Moravia's rulers settled for Latin. The Bulgarian ruler Boris I was baptized in the mid-860s, with Emperor Michael III as his godfather. After involving Rome as well, he obtained an archbishopric for Bulgaria from Constantinople in 870. Serbian princes accepted baptism in the 870s, and around 900 Old Church Slavonic became the official language of the Bulgarian state.

In Poland, Bohemia, Hungary and Rus', as in the South Slavic states, local rulers themselves took the lead in founding states and spreading Christianity, and according to the historian Karol Modzelewski the polities they created were organized very differently from those of the West and Byzantium. The baptism of Mieszko I of Poland is traditionally dated to 966, and the historian Tomasz Jurek places it between 963 and 967. Hungarian chieftains were baptized in Constantinople around 950, but Géza asked Emperor Otto I for missionaries in 972, and his son Stephen I, who succeeded him in 997, received a royal crown from Pope Sylvester II. Vladimir I of Kyiv was baptized in 988, and Rus' was Christianized from Constantinople. Bulgaria and Rus' thus adopted the Greek, or Byzantine, form of Christianity, and Moravia and Hungary the Latin form. In Hungary, however, the Greek and Latin rites coexisted in the 11th and 12th centuries, and according to Olga Lukács the East–West Schism of 1054 had no noticeable effect there before the Eastern rite began to decline rapidly in the first third of the 13th century.

== High and Late Middle Ages (c. 1000–1500) ==
=== Kingdoms of East-Central Europe and German settlement ===
In Hungary the Árpád Age, the era of the first royal dynasty, is conventionally dated from 1000 to 1301. In Bohemia the native Přemyslid dynasty died out in 1306, and the election of John of Luxembourg brought the Luxembourg dynasty to the throne. After the condemnation of the reformer Jan Hus, Hussite clergy and scholars rejected King Sigismund as a tyrant, and he could take the throne only in 1436, after the armed phase of the Hussite Revolution. In 1458 the estates elected a native noble, George of Poděbrady, as king, but in 1469 a Catholic faction of the nobility rose against him and chose Matthias Corvinus of Hungary instead, and the Polish Jagiellonian dynasty later gained the throne.

In 1025 Bolesław I gained recognition abroad as the first king of Poland, ruling a fully independent state. Bolesław III, who died in 1138, introduced a seniorate system that gave provinces to all his sons. By 1150 the country had been divided among them, beginning two centuries of fragmentation. Władysław I the Elbow-high brought enough of the Polish lands back under one ruler for foreign powers to recognize him as the king of a sovereign Poland, and in 1320 he was crowned at Kraków. His son Casimir III the Great (r. 1333–1370) made concessions to Bohemia and the Teutonic Order while expanding to the east, founded Poland's first university at Kraków in 1364 and, lacking a male heir, was the last king of Poland from the Piast dynasty.

From the 13th century, villages and towns in the western Slavic lands bordering Germany were increasingly founded under "German law" (ius Teutonicum). Historians long assumed that settlers from the German lands brought this law with them during the Ostsiedlung, but Polish and Ruthenian communities could also receive it, and it worked as a flexible model rather than a fixed code. In Hungary the recovery after the Mongol invasion brought new settlers (hospites) and burgher towns protected by privileges. After Poland acquired Galicia in the mid-14th century, King Casimir III re-chartered its main towns under Magdeburg law, and Lviv became a model for later foundations.

=== Rus' principalities, the Mongols and the rise of Moscow ===
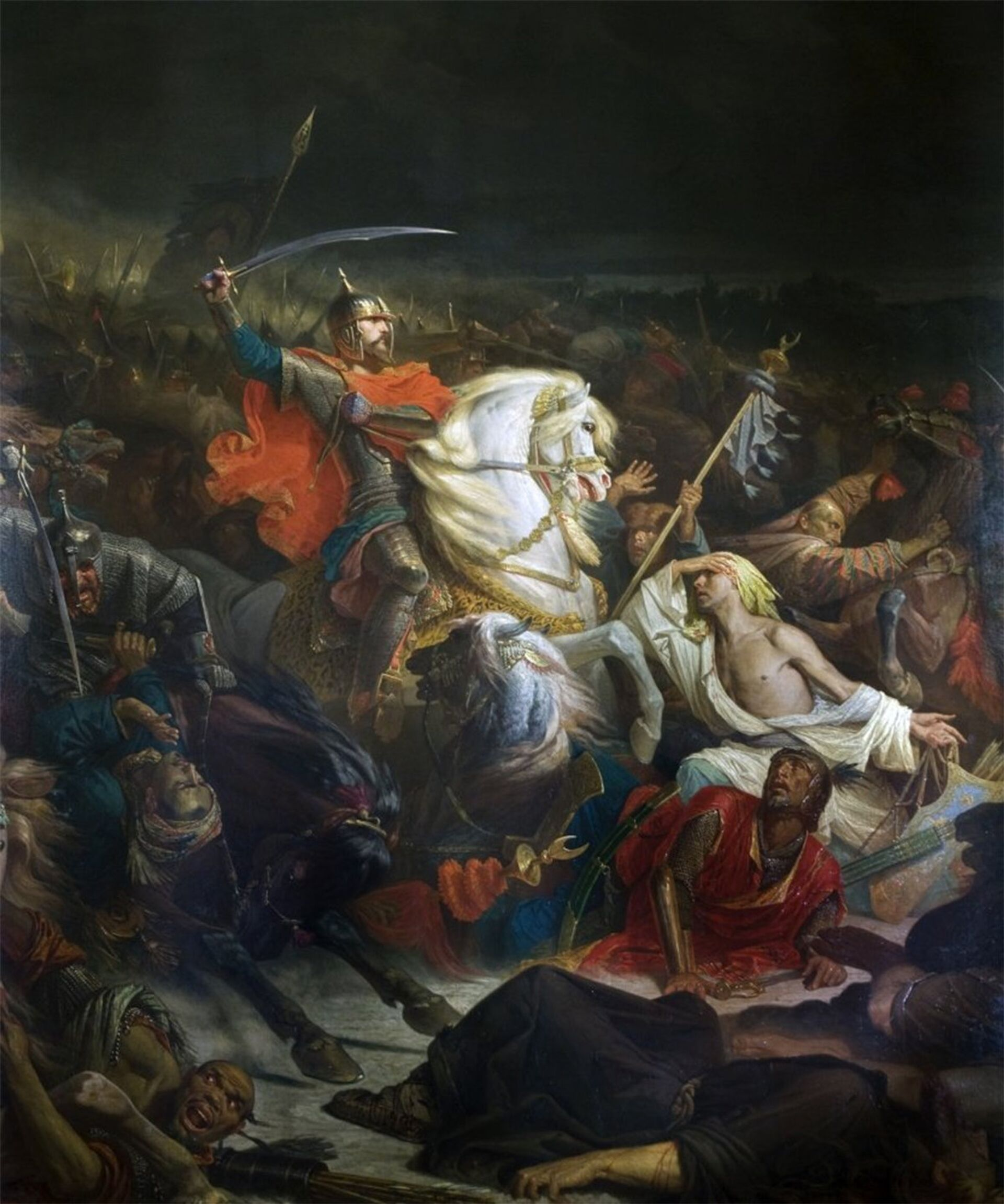
Dmitry Donskoy at the Battle of Kulikovo in an 1849 painting by Adolphe Yvon

By the 12th century Kievan Rus' consisted of principalities held by members of one dynasty, and princes from Vladimir-Suzdal, Novgorod and Galicia–Volhynia still went to Kyiv, the centre of the original "Rus' Land". In the north the city of Novgorod developed a "republican" government. Its town assembly (veche) chose the prince and elected the mayors, and its territory stretched from the Baltic to the Arctic. Novgorod also handled its own dealings with Scandinavia and the Hanseatic League. In 1223 a Mongol army defeated Rus' and Cuman troops at the Kalka.

The Mongols later defeated the Rus' principalities and sacked Kyiv in 1240. In April 1241 they defeated the Poles and the Hungarians, whose royal army was beaten near Muhi in a series of scattered engagements. The reasons for their sudden withdrawal from Hungary in 1242 are still debated. Cuman groups displaced by the Mongol expansion settled on the Hungarian plains. The conquests created the Golden Horde, a new imperial formation in Eastern Europe and Central Asia. The historian Charles Halperin describes the relationship between the Rus' and the Tatars of the Horde as resting "upon destructive conquest and often destructive rule".

In 1249 the khan granted Kyiv and "the whole Rus' Land" to Alexander Nevsky. Ivan I Kalita of Moscow became grand prince of Vladimir in 1328. In 1380 Grand Prince Dmitry Donskoy defeated the Tatar emir Mamai at the Battle of Kulikovo. Ivan III defeated Novgorod on the Shelon River in 1471 and annexed it outright in 1478. The confrontation with Khan Akhmat in 1480 is conventionally taken to mark the end of the "Tatar Yoke".

=== The Baltic crusades, Lithuania and the union with Poland ===
Having subdued the pagan Prussians in the 13th century, the Teutonic Order set out in the 14th century to do the same to pagan Lithuania. The resulting war lasted for most of the century, and knights from much of Western Europe joined the Order's campaigns. Further north, the Order's Livonian branch led a confederation of small states in Livonia and bought northern Estonia from the king of Denmark. Lithuania meanwhile expanded to the south and east. The Grand Duchy of Lithuania took Volhynia and the original Rus' Land of Kyiv and Chernihiv, while Poland acquired Galicia.

In the Act of Krewo of 1385 Grand Duke Jogaila agreed to marry the Polish queen Jadwiga. Baptized and crowned king of Poland in 1386 as Władysław Jagiełło, he brought Lithuania into Christianity. With Lithuania now Christian, the Western campaigns against it ended, although the Order went on attracting crusaders against the pagans of Samogitia for some three decades. Polish historians long read the act of 1385 as incorporating Lithuania into Poland, while recent Lithuanian scholarship treats it as a marriage contract. Jūratė Kiaupienė describes the result as a composite monarchy joining two autonomous states. In an agreement of 1392 Jogaila accepted that his cousin Vytautas had the leading role in ruling Lithuania, and together they defeated the Teutonic Order at the Battle of Grunwald in 1410. The historian Sven Ekdahl concludes that the Order "had been thrown down from the peak of power within a few weeks", while Kiaupienė notes that it was defeated but not vanquished and soon regained strength.

=== Byzantium, the Balkan empires and the Ottoman conquest ===
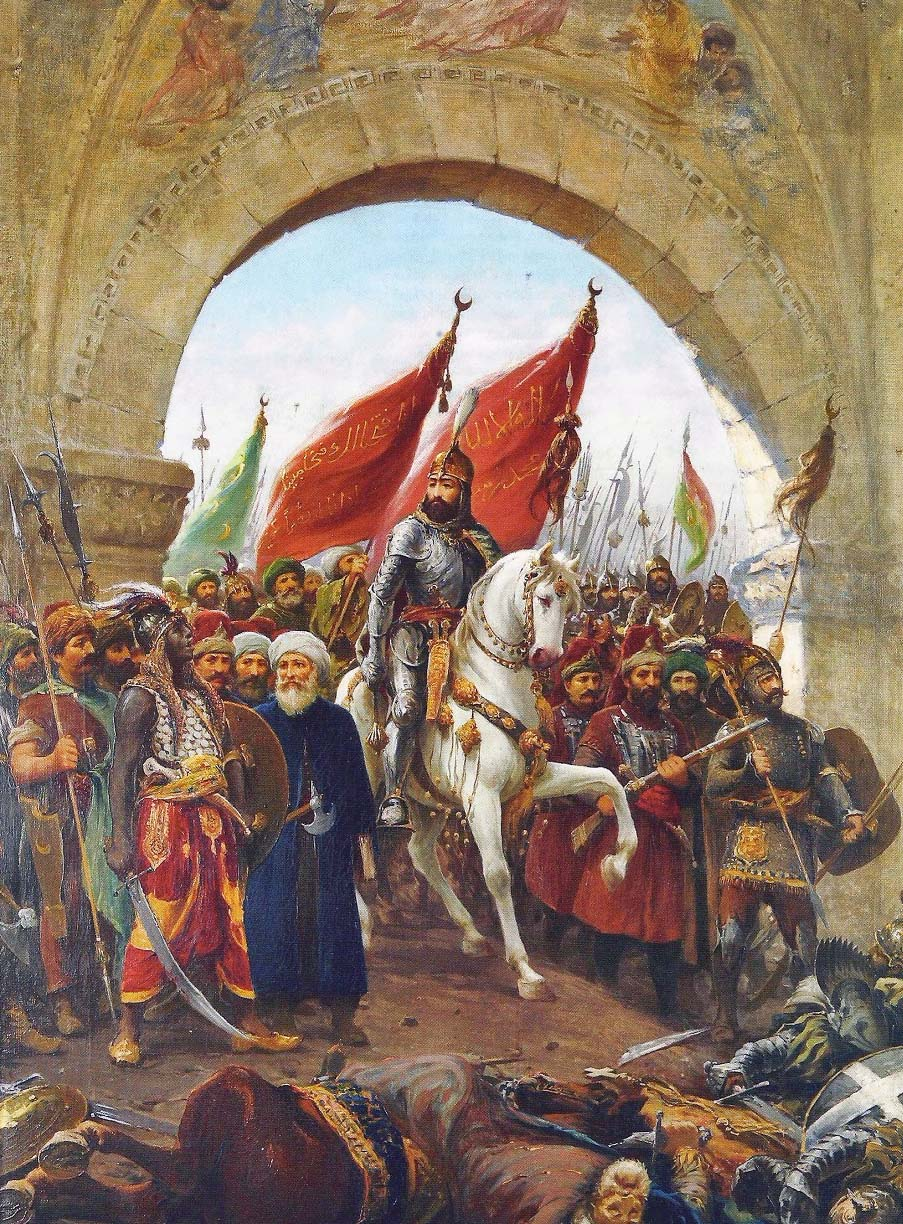
Fausto Zonaro's painting of Mehmed II entering Constantinople in 1453

Bulgaria remained under Byzantine rule until a revolt of 1185 led by the Asen brothers created the Second Bulgarian Empire. The Fourth Crusade took Constantinople in 1204 and set up a Latin Empire. The Bulgarian rulers fought the Latins, with Cuman cavalry playing a key role at Adrianople in 1205, but in 1242 Bulgaria became a tributary of the Golden Horde. Serbia obtained an autocephalous church under Saint Sava in 1219. In 1346, after the Serbian archbishopric was raised to a patriarchate, Stefan Dušan was crowned emperor, and in 1349 his law code was proclaimed at Skopje.

The Ottomans expanded into Southeastern Europe from 1352, and by 1400 they were the dominant power there and in Anatolia. Their conquest of the Balkans was a process lasting from the mid-14th to the late 15th century, in which the Ottomans also installed well-disposed local princes. In June 1389 a Christian army led by the Serbian prince Lazar was defeated at the Battle of Kosovo, where Lazar was killed. The battle later became central to Serbian national memory. A crusade against the Ottomans failed at Nicopolis in 1396, and in 1444 the Ottomans defeated a Hungarian army at Varna, where Władysław III, king of Poland and Hungary, was killed. The Ottomans took Constantinople in 1453.

Further north, Hungary's Transylvanian forces under John Hunyadi repelled Ottoman invasions and raided into the Ottoman Balkans. The Serbian Despotate fell in 1459 and Bosnia in 1463. Wallachia and Moldavia owed Hungary a vassal-like loyalty, and Moldavia owed the same to Poland. In 1462, while the Wallachian prince Vlad the Impaler was at war with the sultan, Stephen the Great of Moldavia moved against him. The historian Oliver Jens Schmitt estimates that about eighty years usually passed between the first Ottoman attack on a region and its complete conquest.

== See also ==
- Eastern Europe
- History of Europe
- Central Europe
- History of the Balkans
- History of Belarus
- History of Poland
- History of Russia
- History of Ukraine
- Eastern Bloc
