= Susanne Kappeler =

Lecturer in English at University of East Anglia

Susanne Kappeler (born 1949) was a lecturer in English at the University of East Anglia and an associate professor at the School of Humanities and Social Sciences, Al Akhawayn University, and now works as a freelance writer and teacher in England and Germany. Kappeler also taught 'The literary representation of women' in the Faculty of English at Cambridge while a research fellow at Jesus College, Cambridge and was a part-time tutor for the Open University Course, 'The Changing Experience of Women', and is part of a collective setting up the Cambridge Women's Resources Centre.

== Publications ==
- Kappeler, Susanne, Mira Renka, and Melanie Beyer. Vergewaltigung, Krieg, Nationalismus: eine feministische Kritik. München: Frauenoffensive, 1994. ISBN 978-3-88104-246-8
- Teaching the Text co-ed. with Norman Bryson. Routledge, 1983. ISBN 978-0-7100-9412-4
- Writing and Reading in Henry James, Columbia University Press, 1980, ISBN 978-0-231-05198-9
  - Review by Paul B. Armstrong, 1983. Nineteenth-Century Fiction 38, no. 1: 122–124.
- Pornography of Representation, University of Minnesota Press and Polity Press, 1986, ISBN 978-0-7456-0122-9
  - Review by Charlotte Hogsett, South Atlantic Review, Jan., 1988, vol. 53, no. 1, p. 99-101
  - Review by Beverley Brown; Journal of Law and Society, Winter, 1989, vol. 16, no. 4, p. 512-518
  - Review by Ellen Rooney, Novel: A Forum on Fiction, Autumn, 1988, vol. 22, no. 1, p. 106-110
- Verena Loewensberg: Betrachtungen zum Werk einer konstruktiven Malerin (in German), ABC Verlag, 1988, ISBN 978-3-85504-063-6
- Kappeler, Susanne, and Carlo Vivarelli. Carlo Vivarelli: Plastik, Malerei, Gebrauchsgraphik = Carlo Vivarelli : sculpture, painting, graphic design. Zürich: ABC Verlag, 1988. ISBN 978-3-85504-112-1
- Der Wille zur Gewalt: Politik des persönlichen Verhaltens (in German), Frauenoffensive, 1994, ISBN 978-3-88104-254-3; in English: The Will to Violence, Columbia University Teachers College Press and Spinifex Press, 1995, ISBN 978-1-875559-46-6, a book that analyses "the way in which the psychotherapeutic professions work to develop a culture of irresponsibility in personal relationships"
- Kappeler, Susanne (1996), "Subjects, objects and equal opportunities", in Jackson, Stevi; Scott, Sue (eds.), Feminism and sexuality: a reader, New York: Columbia University Press, pp. 300–306, ISBN 9780231107082.
