= Mark Zborowski =

American anthropologist and spy (1908–1990)

- Born: Mark Zborowski; January 27, 1908; Uman, Kiev Governorate, Russian Empire
- Died: April 30, 1990 (aged 82); San Francisco, California, United States
- Other name: Marc Zborowski
- Education: University of Grenoble
- Occupations: Anthropologist and NKVD agent
- Espionage activity
- Allegiance: Soviet Union
- Codename: TULIP
- Codename: KANT

Mark Zborowski (27 January 1908 – 30 April 1990) (AKA "Marc" Zborowski or Etienne) was an anthropologist and an NKVD agent (Venona codenames TULIP and KANT). He was the NKVD's most valuable mole inside the Trotskyist organization in Paris during the 1930s and in New York during the 1940s.

== Childhood in Uman ==
Zborowski was one of four children born into a Jewish family in Uman, near Cherkasy, in 1908. According to the story Zborowski told friends, his conservative parents moved to Poland in 1921 to escape the October Revolution in Russia. While he was a student, Zborowski disobeyed his parents and joined the Polish Communist Party. His political activity led to imprisonment and he fled to Berlin where he was unsuccessful in finding employment. He moved to France and attended the University of Grenoble, studying anthropology and working as a waiter.

== Early life in Paris ==
In 1933, the penniless Zborowski turned up in Paris with his wife and was recruited as an NKVD agent by the Leningrad émigré Alexander Adler. He provided the NKVD with a written background and revealed that his sister and two brothers lived in the Soviet Union. According to historian John J. Dziak, the NKVD had recruited him into a special group that murdered special enemies of Joseph Stalin. Those assassinated included Ignace Reiss (1937), Andrés Nin (1937), and Walter Krivitsky (1941). Members of the group are said to have included Leonid Eitingon, Nikolai Vasilyevich Skoblin, Sergei Efron, and David Alfaro Siqueiros, and perhaps the psychoanalyst Max Eitingon.

=== Embedding with Lev Sedov ===
The NKVD took steps to infiltrate him into the Paris organization run by Leon Trotsky's son Lev Sedov. Known as Etienne, Zborowski befriended Sedov's wife, Jeanne Martin, and she recommended him for the position of Sedov's secretary. Because of his obsequious nature and untiring work, and because he was also a Russian speaker in what was mostly a French group, Etienne soon became indispensable to Sedov. He served as a member of the group's Central Committee, read and answered Sedov's mail, edited the Russian language version of the Bulletin of the Opposition, stored part of the Trotsky archive at his home, and served as Sedov's deputy in his absence. All the while Etienne reported on the activity of Trotsky (codename OLD MAN), Sedov (codename SONNY), and the Trotskyists (codename POLECATS) to his NKVD handlers.

=== Death of Lev Sedov ===
On 8 February 1938, the overworked Sedov suffered a severe attack of appendicitis. Etienne convinced him to have the operation secretly at a small private clinic run by Russian emigres in Paris, the location of which Etienne immediately revealed to the NKVD. Sedov was operated on the same evening and appeared, over the next few days, to have a healthy recovery. Suddenly he became violently ill, and despite repeated blood transfusions, he died in great pain on 16 February at the age of thirty-one. Historians differ as to whether or not the NKVD murdered Sedov, and there is considerable evidence to support either scenario.

=== Internal investigation by Trotskyists ===
After Sedov's death, Trotsky initiated an investigation of Etienne and entrusted the matter to Rudolf Klement, his one-time aide and organizer of Trotsky's Fourth International. Before Klement could complete the investigation, an NKVD agent named Ale Taubman lured him to an apartment on the Left Bank and murdered him with the help of two other agents, the "Turk" and Alexander Korotkov. They cut off Klement's head and legs and stuffed the body parts in a trunk and threw it into the Seine. Several days later, the Trotskyists received a typewritten letter from Klement, accusing Trotsky of collaboration with Adolf Hitler. The letter, clearly an NKVD fabrication, was no doubt meant to explain Klement's disappearance and to denounce Trotsky at the same time. However, Klement's headless corpse washed ashore in August 1938 and was identified, from a scar on the one hand, by two Trotskyists.

=== Death of Trotsky ===
Etienne now became the leader of the beheaded Trotskyist organization in Paris and continued to edit the Bulletin of the Opposition, along with Lilia Estrin Dallin (codename NEIGHBOR). He used his skills to play upon the vanities of the remaining Trotskyists and create internal divisions within the faction, especially isolating Victor Serge. In 1939, the defector Alexander Orlov sent Trotsky an unsigned letter warning him that an NKVD agent named "Mark", fitting the description of Zborowski, had infiltrated the Paris organization. Much to her later regret, Dallin convinced Trotsky that the letter was NKVD disinformation meant to create fear within the Trotskyist faction. Meanwhile, Etienne played a small but significant role in the plot to assassinate Trotsky. At the founding conference of the Fourth International in Paris in September 1938, Etienne introduced his friend Sylvia Ageloff, an American Trotskyist and interpreter, and probably the Soviet agent, to Ramón Mercader, the future assassin of Trotsky. Sylvia later said that the passionate Mercader seduced her, an unattractive twenty-eight-year-old. She followed him to Mexico and infiltrated him into Trotsky's household. Mercader murdered Trotsky by striking him in the skull with an ice-axe on 20 August 1940.

== Later life in New York ==
=== Tracking of Kravchenko ===
Zborowski fled to the United States following the German invasion of France. The American Trotskyists David and Lilia Dallin assisted in his emigration and helped him obtain employment at a screw factory in Brooklyn. With money from an unknown source, he rented a fashionable Manhattan apartment in the Dallins' building and once again resumed his former occupation, spying on Trotskyists. His codenames TULIP and KANT appear in nearly two dozen Venona decrypts. He reported to the Soviet controller Jack Soble. Zborowski spied on the Dallins and helped the NKVD search for Victor Kravchenko, a Soviet engineer and mid-level bureaucrat who defected from a trade mission in 1944. Kravchenko published a book, I Chose Freedom (1946), which described the repressions in the Soviet Union, the purges, the collectivizations, and the slave labour camps.

=== Academia ===
By 1945, Zborowski's usefulness as an agent had come to an end. He turned his attention to his academic career and found employment, with the aid of Margaret Mead, as a research assistant at Harvard University. In 1952, he published Life Is with People (co-authored with Elizabeth Herzog), a groundbreaking study of Jewish life in the shtetls of Eastern Europe before the Second World War. The book received critical acclaim and has been reprinted numerous times. From 1951-1954 he researched at Cornell University. He became an American citizen in 1947.

=== Senate investigation and conviction ===
The defector Alexander Orlov unmasked Zborowski before a hearing of the Senate Internal Security Subcommittee in September 1955. The FBI already knew that Zborowski was an NKVD agent from information they had obtained from their double-agent Boris Morros. Zborowski appeared before the Senate Subcommittee in February 1956. Since he was free from prosecution for his activities in France, Zborowski admitted to being an NKVD agent in Paris but he denied working as an agent in America. In his testimony he claimed that the NKVD had tried to enlist him as an agent in New York but he had refused: "At that time, I became almost--I became hysterical and I remember well, I hit my fist on the table and said, 'I will not do anything with you anymore.' And I walked out. Since then, I have not seen anyone." As the Venona decrypts clearly prove, Zborowski lied about this and other parts of his testimony. Zborowski was convicted of perjury and after an appeal and retrial he received a four-year prison sentence in 1962.

=== Return to academia ===
Following his release, he resumed his academic career and published People in Pain (1969), a study of responses to pain by people of different cultures. He moved to San Francisco, where, in time, he rose to the position of Director of the Pain Institute at Mount Zion Hospital.

=== Security and the Fourth International ===
Zborowski was located and photographed by David North in 1975 as part of the International Committee of the Fourth International's investigation into the death of Leon Trotsky, and other leading members of the Trotskyist movement, known as Security and the Fourth International.

Suzi Weissman, the biographer of Victor Serge repeatedly attempted to visit Zborowski.

=== Death ===
Zborowski died in 1990 at the age of eighty-two.

== Confessions ==
=== Confession to Elisabeth Poretsky ===
When they were both living in the United States, Zborowski twice visited the home of Elisabeth Poretsky one day in the spring of 1955, she believed according to her memoirs. This followed visits by the FBI, who came to her and inquired about "Etienne" (as she refers to him). During their second visit, the FBI informed her that they believed Zborowski to be an NKVD agent. When she next saw him, Zborowski barged into her home once the door opened.

About his overall activities, he confessed:

"I came to tell you that it is all true. I have been an N.K.V.D. agent for more than twenty years" ... He did not wait for me to ask him anything, however, but began to tell me how he had been recruited by a fellow worker, a Russian, in Grenoble, who had suggested he go to Paris, where he could find friends and "be useful to the Soviet Union." The story of how Etienne had infiltrated the Trotskyite organization—where, in fact, very little that was of interest to the N.K.V.D. was going on—contained nothing unexpected ...

About the murder of Trotsky's son, he said:

I asked about Sedov who, according to Etienne, had been the main target of his spying. "Do you remember, when I saw you a few days after Sedov's death, what you told me then and how defeated you were? ... That was the happiest day of my life ... I did not have to spy on him anymore, I did not have to denounce him. My job was finished, or so I thought ..."

About his role in the assassination of Poretsky's husband Ludwik (AKA Ignace Poretsky), he said:

I asked him outright whether it was he who had informed the N.K.V.D. of the contents of Krivitsky's "Krusia" letter to me. "Did Serge [Sedov] show you that letter?" A wry, pitiful smile on his distorted face and a shrug of the shoulders were his only reply. It was neither a confirmation nor a denial, just that helpless smile of his. It as the same with all the questions I asked about Ludwick's murder. Only a shrug of the shoulders .I knew then without a doubt who had informed the N.K.V.D.

=== Confession in Margaret Mead papers ===
According to Steven Zipperstein of Stanford University:

Zborowski was not given to self-revelation. But amidst the huge body of material about Jews collected for Mead's project... is an interview with Zborowski about his childhood and youth that is probably the most honest statement he ever recorded. He provided the information in 1947, just before anti-communism surfaced as a major post-war preoccupation, two years after his espionage work had ended, and almost a decade before he was unmasked. He seems to have felt safer from detection, freer to talk, than ever before or afterwards.

He tells of his childhood in Uman and the social downfall of his middle-class parents. His family left Russia for Poland (first Lwów, then Łódź), then how he himself left for France in 1928 with wife Regina. Communists recruited him while he worked as a busboy in Grenoble. In Paris, his quietude and acquiescence won him constant use and confidence among new Lev Sedov and Trotskyist comrades in Paris.

== Publications ==
- Life Is with People with Elizabeth Herzog (1952)
- People in Pain (1969)

== Sources ==
- John Costello and Oleg Tsarev, Deadly Illusions : The KGB Orlov Dossier Reveals Stalin's Master Spy, Crown Publishing, 1993. ISBN 0-517-58850-1
- John Earl Haynes and Harvey Klehr, Venona: Decoding Soviet Espionage in America, Yale University Press, 1999. 504 pages ISBN 0-300-08462-5
- Elisabeth K. Poretsky, Our own people: A memoir of 'Ignace Reiss' and his friends, University of Michigan Press, 1969. 278 pages ISBN 0-472-73500-4
- Jack Soble File, at the Federal Bureau of Investigation.
- Pavel Sudoplatov, Special Tasks, Little, Brown and Company, 1994. 576 pages ISBN 0-316-82115-2
- Dmitri Volkogonov, Trotsky: The Eternal Revolutionary, Simon & Schuster, 1996. ISBN 0-684-82293-8
- Susan Weissman, Victor Serge: The Course is Set on Hope, Verso, 2001. ISBN 1-85984-987-3
