= Andreas Kappeler =

Swiss historian (born 1943)

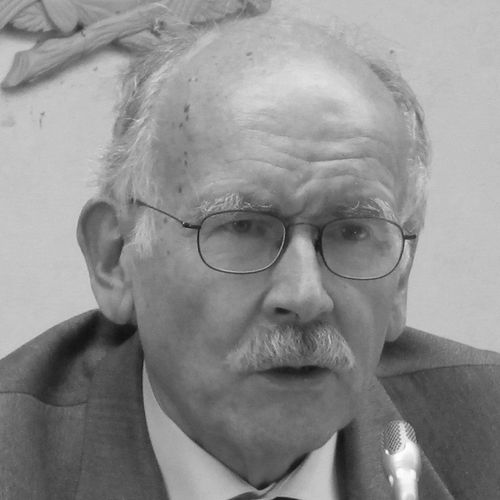
Image of Portrait Andreas Kappeler

Andreas Kappeler (born 1943) is a Swiss historian. He is professor emeritus for the history of Eastern Europe at the University of Vienna.

== Life ==
Kappeler was born in Winterthur, Switzerland on September 20, 1943. From 1962 to 1969, he studied history, slavistics, publizistik (roughly communication science) and history of Eastern Europe at the universities of Zurich and Vienna. He spent extensive periods in Paris, Helsinki, and Moscow in the following years before he became a professor for East European History at the University of Cologne. In 1998 he moved to the University of Vienna, where in 2006 he initiated the Doctoral Programme Austrian Galicia and its Multicultural Heritage. Until 2016, he remained the responsible editor for one of the most reputable journals in East European studies, the Jahrbücher für Osteuropäische Geschichte.

== Academic research ==
Kappeler's research focus is the Russia of the modern era with a special focus on the different nationalities of the pre-modern Tsarist Empire, with social historical issues being the focus of his interest. He is considered a specialist in the history of Muslims in Russia and Central Asia. As one of the first historians in the German-speaking world, he began dealing with the History of Ukraine as early as the 1980s. After his appointment to the University of Vienna, he increasingly included the former Habsburg areas of today's Ukraine (Galicia) in his research. In 2017, he noted that the West had erroneously "adopted the Russian perspective, which has had the prerogative of interpretation for two centuries," in matters relating to the nations surrounding Ukraine.

== Awards ==
- 1996 Foreign member of the National Academy of Sciences of Ukraine
- 1996 Foreign member of the Chuvash Academy of Sciences
- 2001 Member of the Austrian Academy of Sciences
- 2006 Kardinal-Innitzer-Prize
- 2007 Honorary doctorate of the Chuvash State University in Cheboksary, (Chuvashia, Russland)

== Published works ==
- Kappeler, Andreas (2001).The Russian Empire. A Multi-ethnic History. New York Routledge. ISBN 9780582234154 (several editions)
- Kappeler, Andreas (2003). Culture, nation, and identity. The Ukrainian-Russian encounter, 1600-1945 / edited together with Zenon E. Kohut, Frank E. Sysyn and Mark von Hagen. Edmonton, Toronto: Canadian Institute of Ukrainian Studies Press.
- Kappeler, Andreas (2022). Kleine Geschichte der Ukraine (in German) (8th ed.). München: Beck. ISBN 978-3406735585.
- Kappeler, Andreas (2016). Russische Geschichte (in German) (7th ed.). München: Beck. ISBN 978-3-406-47076-9.
