= Marshall D. Shulman =

American diplomat and scholar of Soviet studies

Marshall D. Shulman

Marshall Darrow Shulman (1916 - June 21, 2007) was an American diplomat, scholar of Soviet studies and the founding director of W. Averell Harriman Institute for Advanced Study of the Soviet Union at Columbia University.

Born in Jersey City, New Jersey, Shulman earned a bachelor's degree from the University of Michigan, a graduate degree in English literature from Harvard University, and a master's degree from Columbia University's Russian Institute.

He served as an information officer for the US mission to the United Nations, as special assistant to Dean Acheson, and as special adviser on Soviet affairs to Secretary of State Cyrus R. Vance. He was also an associate director of the Russian Research Center at Harvard University.
