= U.S. Naval Base Subic Bay =

Former Spanish and American military facility in Zambales, Philippines

- Subic Bay, Philippines
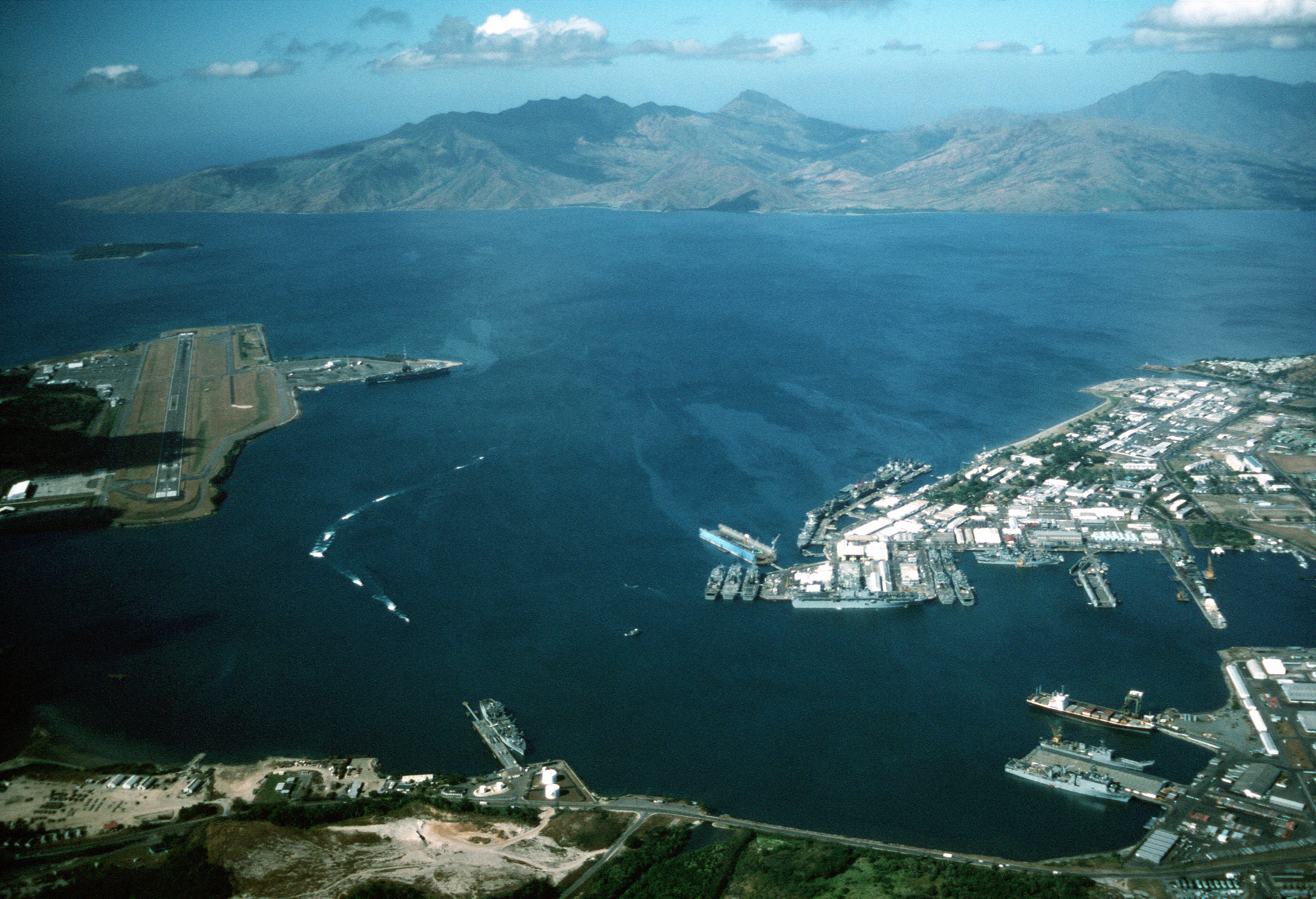
- An aerial view of Naval Station Subic Bay (right) and Naval Air Station Cubi Point (left; present-day Subic Bay International Airport).

Site information
- Type: Naval base

Location
- Coordinates: 14°48′30″N 120°17′30″E

Site history
- Built: 1885
- Built by: Spain
- In use: Spain (1885–1898); United States (1899–1942); Japan (1942–1945); United States (1945–1992; 2023–present); Philippines (2022–present)
- Fate: Reactivated

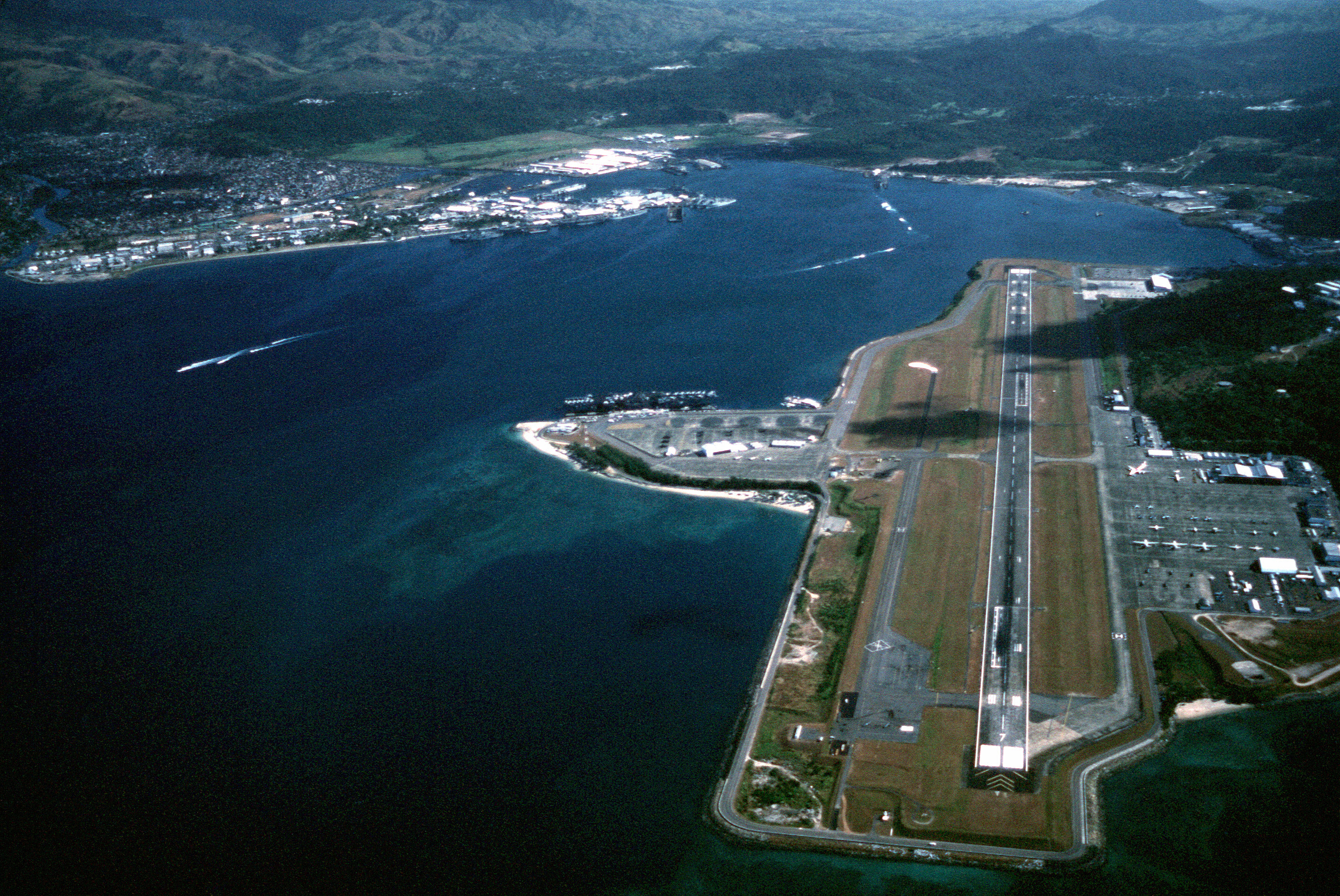
An aerial view of Cubi Point and, in the background, Naval Station Subic Bay

Naval Base Subic Bay was a major ship-repair, supply, and rest and recreation facility of the Spanish Navy and, subsequently, the United States Navy located in Olongapo City, Philippines. The base was 262 square miles (680 km^{2}) – about the size of Singapore. The Navy Exchange had the largest volume of sales of any exchange in the world and the Naval Supply Depot handled the largest volume of fuel oil of any navy facility in the world. The naval base was the largest overseas military installation of the United States Armed Forces, after Clark Air Base in Angeles City was closed in 1991. Following its closure in 1992, it was transformed into the Subic Bay Freeport Zone by the Filipino government.

In late 2022, plans to reopen the base under the Enhanced Defense Cooperation Agreement emerged after the Filipino Navy reoccupied a portion of the base and a U.S. investment firm, Cerberus Capital Management, purchased the remainder of the port.

== Spanish period ==
Subic Bay's strategic location, sheltered anchorages, and deep water had first been made known when the Spanish explorer Juan de Salcedo reported the bay's existence to the Spanish authorities upon his return to Manila after Salcedo arrived in Zambales to establish Spanish rule. It would be a number of years before Spain would consider establishing a base there.

Cavite, which had been home to most of the Spanish fleet in the Philippines, suffered from unhealthy living conditions and was vulnerable in time of war and bad weather because of its shallow waters and lack of shelter. Therefore, a military expedition was sent to Subic Bay in 1868, with orders to survey the area if it would be a suitable site for a naval yard. The Spanish explored the entire bay and concluded that it had much promise and thus reported their findings to Cavite. This report was not well received in Manila, as the Spanish command was reluctant to move to the provincial isolation of Subic. Finally, in 1884, a Royal Decree declared Subic Bay a naval port.

On 8 March 1885, the Spanish Navy authorized construction of the Arsenal de Olongapo and by the following September, work started at Olongapo. Both the harbor and its inner basin were dredged and a drainage canal was built, as the Spanish military authorities were planning to make Olongapo and their navy yard an "island". This canal also served as a line of defense and over which the bridge at the base's Main Gate passes. When the Arsenal was finished, the gunboats Caviteño, Santa Ana and San Quintín were assigned for its defense. To complement these gunboats, coastal artilleries were planned for the east and west ends of the station, as well as on Grande Island.

Seawalls, causeways and a short railway were built across the swampy tidal flats. To finish these projects, thousands of tons of earth and rock from Kalalake in Olongapo had to be brought in as fill. The magnitude of this quarrying was so huge that a hill eventually disappeared and became a lagoon in the area now known as Bicentennial Park.

The main entrance to the Arsenal was the extant West Gate. This gate was equipped with gunports and served as a jail. This gate was connected to the South Gate, which was near the waterfront, by a high wall of locally quarried stone.

Inside the Arsenal, the Spanish constructed a foundry, as well as other shops, which were necessary for the construction and repair of ships. The buildings were laid out in two rows on Rivera Point, a sandy patch of land jutting into the bay, and named after the incumbent Captain-General of the Philippines, Fernando Primo de Rivera. The Arsenal's showpiece was the station commandant's headquarters, which was a one-storey building of molave and narra wood, and stood near today's Alava Pier and had colored glass windows.

The Spanish navy yard was constructed in the area that was last occupied by the U.S. Naval Ship Repair Facility. During the Filipino Revolution against Spain, the Cuban-Filipino admiral of the Filipino Navy, Vicente Catalan, seized Subic Naval base from the Spanish and delivered it to the First Filipino Republic.

== Battle of Manila Bay ==
On 25 April 1898, Commodore George Dewey, Commander of the United States Asiatic Fleet, received word that war with Spain had been declared and was ordered to leave Hong Kong and attack the Spanish fleet in Manila Bay.

In the Philippines, Rear Admiral Patricio Montojo, realizing that Subic Bay would provide a more defensible position than Cavite, ordered his smaller ships and the batteries in Manila Bay to resist Dewey's fleet and deny them the entrance to Manila Bay. His other units would then use Subic Bay as a sally port, with which he could attack the American fleet's rear and cut off its supplies. On 26 April, Montojo arrived at Subic Bay aboard Reina Cristina with seven other ships.

On the morning of 27 April, Castilla was towed northeast of Grande Island to help control the western entrance to Subic Bay. The eastern entrance, which was between Grande and Chiquita Islands, had been blocked by the scuttling of San Quintín and two other vessels. On Grande Island, the four 5.9-inch (150 mm) Ordóñez guns that had been shipped from Sangley Point were not yet installed. Meanwhile, a cable-laying ship, which was commandeered to lay mines, ended up putting only four of the 15 available mines in place.

In Hong Kong, Dewey purposely delayed his sailing until he received news from the U.S. Consul at Manila, Oscar F. Williams, with information about the strength and positions of the Spanish fleet. Williams told Dewey that Montojo and his fleet had sailed to Subic Bay.

On 30 April, Dewey sighted the islands of Luzon and thus ordered USS Boston and USS Concord to sail at full speed to Subic Bay to hunt for enemy ships. After seeing no enemy vessels at Subic, Boston and Concord signaled Olympia of their findings and rejoined the squadron underway to Manila.

At dawn of 1 May 1898, the American fleet entered Manila Bay. Once the ships closed to within 5,000 yards (4,600 m) of the Spanish fleet, Dewey ordered the Captain, Charles Gridley, of Olympia: "You may fire when you are ready, Gridley". Montojo's fleet was destroyed, losing 167 men killed and 214 wounded. The Americans only suffered a handful of wounded.

In June 1898, nearly a thousand Spanish nationals left Olongapo and took refuge at Grande Island. By July, Dewey ordered Raleigh and Concord to sail for Subic Bay to demand the surrender of Grande Island. When the American ships arrived, they saw the German cruiser Irene at the island, but as the Americans cleared for action and started to head for Irene, she fled around the other end of Grande. The Spanish garrison on the island did not resist and immediately surrendered to Captain Joseph Coghlan of Raleigh.

== Filipino–American War ==
During the Filipino–American War, the Americans focused on using the Spanish naval station at Sangley Point, largely ignoring Subic Bay, and the arsenal was occupied by Filipino forces. The Filipinos constructed a gun battery on top of a ridge using one of the 6-inch (15 cm) guns on Grande Island.

In the summer of 1899, gunboats started patrolling Subic Bay and after realizing that the patrols would not stop, the Filipinos started to prepare to confront the Americans. During a routine patrol, the supply ship Zafiro entered Subic Bay and came under fire from the newly constructed battery. Zafiro withdrew to Cavite and reported the incident to headquarters. The cruiser Charleston was then sent to Subic to silence the battery, but as she was withdrawing, the battery gave out one last shot, provoking the Americans.

On 23 September 1899, Charleston, Concord, Monterey and Zafiro sailed into Subic Bay to destroy the battery. Upon clearing Kalaklan Point, Monterey, equipped with 10-and-12-inch (254 and 305 mm) guns, opened fire. Under this barrage, the battery was only able to fire one shot.

Charleston then sent a signal for 180 sailors and 70 Marines to land on Subic. Meanwhile, the other ships continued firing. The Filipinos then deployed into the town of Olongapo, returning fire with small arms. When the entire landing force was ashore, the ships ceased firing and the landing party entered the battery. In all, three charges of guncotton were placed on the battery, completely destroying it. The party then went back to their ships and sailed for Manila. While the battery was destroyed, the Filipino forces still held the navy yard as well as Olongapo.

In December 1899, the U.S. Army launched an operation to clear the countryside of Filipinos who were resisting American rule; 90 soldiers from the 32^{d} U.S. Volunteers set out to capture Olongapo. As the soldiers were entering Santa Rita, just outside Olongapo, they met a pocket of resistance, but after returning fire, the armed Filipinos quickly scattered. The soldiers then proceeded to capture the navy yard.

When Rear Admiral John C. Watson learned of this action against the navy yard, he set out for Subic aboard Baltimore, accompanied by Oregon. When the ships arrived, Watson was surprised that the U.S. Army was in complete possession of the navy yard. Watson then ordered Marine Captain John Twiggs Myers ashore with 100 Marines to secure the navy yard.

When the Marines found the highest flagpole on the navy yard, which was in front of the hospital, they immediately raised the American flag on 10 December 1899, one year after the Treaty of Paris was signed. The Marines then took responsibility for the navy yard while the Army took over administrative and operational control of Olongapo.

Drinking water was not available on the navy yard and so water details had to be sent to the village of Binictican, near the mouth of the river of the same name. Early during the occupation of Olongapo, the town was offered as a place of refuge for Filipinos who were sympathetic to the Americans. After an ambush of seven Marines, the inhabitants of the villages of Binictican and Boton were ordered to move into Olongapo or be declared outlaws. Those people who owned property in the two villages were given houses in Olongapo. Six days after the villagers settled in Olongapo, Nashville shelled Binictican and Boton and later 100 Marines completed the destruction.

The Marines then exercised civil authority over Olongapo and ordered municipal elections, appointed local policemen, gave away food to supplement poor harvests, supplied medical care and supplies, and set up a school for the teaching of the English language.

In 1900, the General Board of the United States Navy made a thorough study of the naval base building program and decided that the American fleet in the Philippines could be easily bottled up in either the Manila or Subic bays. They instead recommended Guimaras Island, south of Manila, as the most suitable site for the main American naval base in the Philippines. Admiral of the Navy George Dewey and Admiral George C. Remey, Commander of the Asiatic Fleet, disagreed. They thought Subic Bay held the greatest potential.

The Navy then called for another study with Remey as the senior member. This board then decided that Subic Bay was the most suitable and practicable place to build a naval base. A board of officers under Rear Admiral Henry C. Taylor was then appointed to develop a plan for the naval station. Extensive plans for: fortifications, dockyards, drydocks, workshops, a hospital, a railroad linking Olongapo with Manila and storage facilities for 20,000 tons (18,000 metric tons) of coal were drawn up and submitted to the Congress.

The board requested an appropriation of $1 million ($27040000, in 2025 dollars) to begin building the naval station. President Theodore Roosevelt, a strong supporter of the establishment of a naval station at Subic Bay, issued an Executive Order establishing the Subic Bay Naval Reservation.

Because of the establishment of the Subic Bay Naval Reservation in November 1901 more troops were assigned to Subic. When the Samar force returned at the beginning of March 1902, its personnel were divided between Olongapo and Cavite. Cavite, however, still continued to have the largest number of Marines anywhere in the Philippines and continued to be the headquarters of the U.S. Navy because of its proximity to Manila.

In December 1902, Rear Admiral Robley D. Evans, Commander of the Asiatic Fleet, directed the first fleet exercise in Asian waters. An expeditionary force of 200 Marines occupied and erected guns on Grande Island. The channels on each side of the island were mined, while vessels of the fleet operated in the bay itself. The exercise was highly successful and confirmed the Admiral's opinion of the strategic advantage of Subic Bay.

The value of Subic Bay as a training area was recognized as the Marines practiced movements in wild and difficult environment. Their building of bridges and roads was also considered to be excellent training.

In June 1907, as tensions with Japan mounted, orders were secretly issued for Army and Navy forces in the Philippines to concentrate at Subic Bay. A large supply of coal and certain advanced base materials including coastal defense guns were to be moved from Cavite. This plan, however, would be opposed by other military leaders and by Governor-General Leonard Wood. An acrimonious debate would emerge and plans to build a major base in the Philippines would be discarded. Roosevelt would be disappointed by this, wrote that the aforementioned decision was a humiliating experience, and instead pushed for the development of Pearl Harbor in Hawaii.

== World War I and interwar years ==
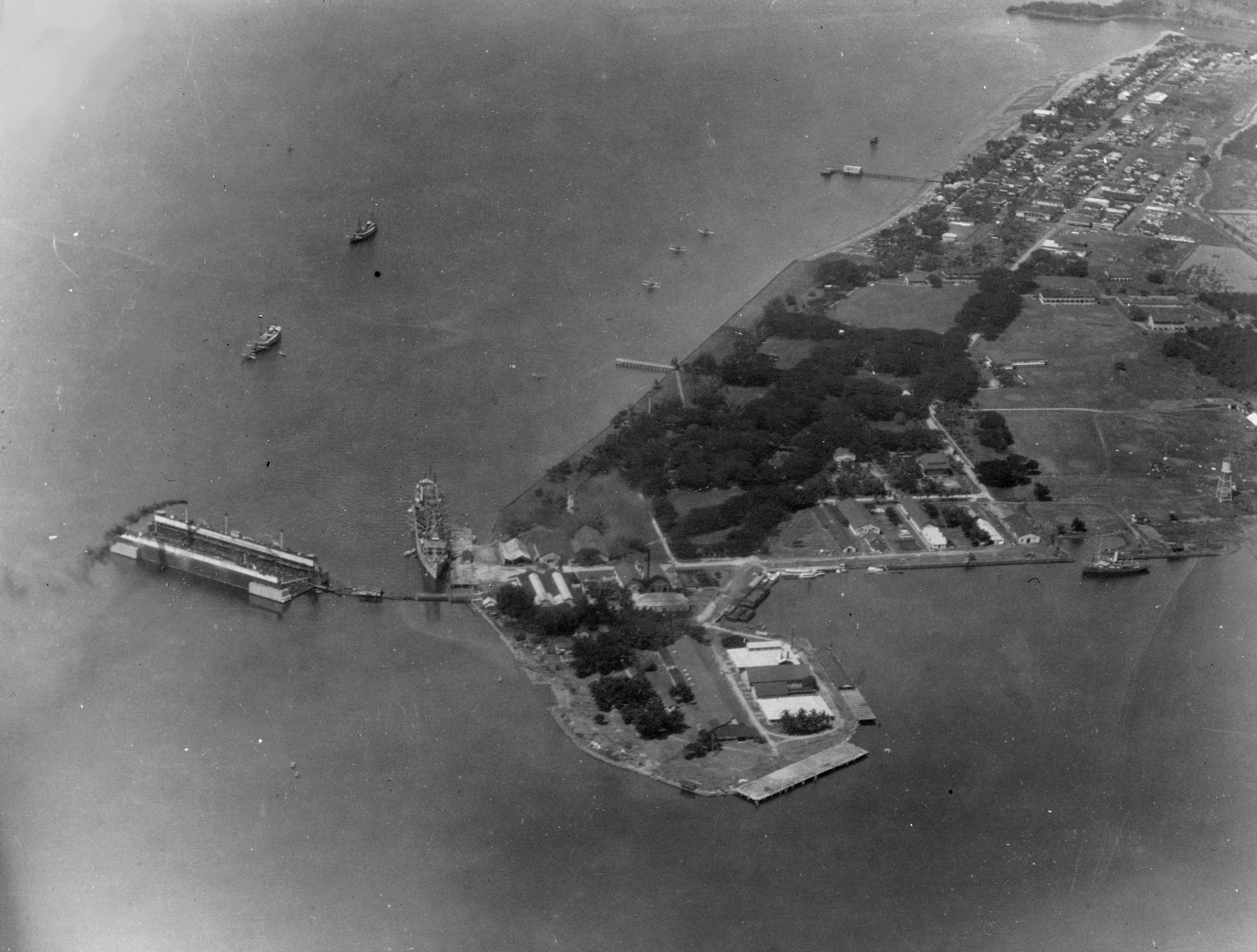
Aerial view of Olongapo Naval Station (later, the U.S. Naval Base Subic Bay), 1928

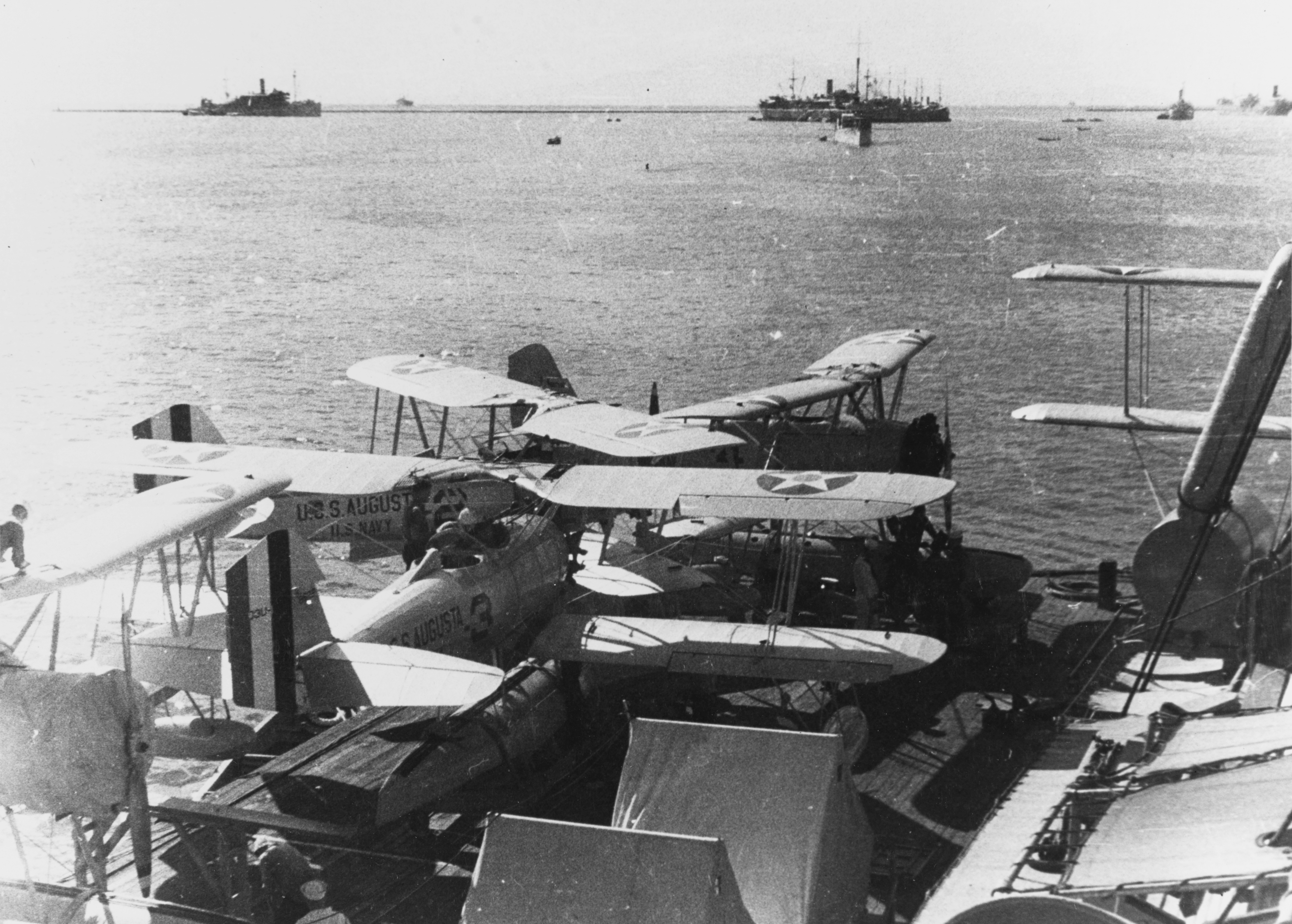
1933: Vought O3U-1 "Corsair" observation planes aboard the Augusta, during exercises in Subic Bay

In 1917, as the United States was drawn into World War I, all the Navy's shipyards including Subic Bay began working at a feverish pace to prepare ships for sea. American and Filipino workers would take pride in their workmanship, such that destroyers that were overhauled in Subic Bay became the vanguard of Admiral William Sims's convoy.

The Washington Naval Treaty of 1922 called for the limitation of naval armaments and included provisions that facilities for the repair and maintenance of American naval forces in the Philippines would be reduced. Shops were dismantled at the navy yard at Subic Bay and Fort Wint was reduced to caretaker status and personnel levels were cut.

The Japanese government kept a close eye on activities in the Philippines for violations of the 1922 treaty. During the typhoon season of 1928, VT Squadron Five which operated Martin torpedo aircraft out of Manila, arrived in Subic Bay on a routine training flight. A typhoon suddenly veered toward Subic Bay and the plane crews had to lay down ramps to haul the seaplanes up on the beach. The pontoons were filled with water and the planes lashed down. When the typhoon had passed, the undamaged planes were refloated and returned to their tenders at Manila.

Within three weeks, the squadron commander was informed of a Japanese complaint that the Navy had violated the treaty by increasing the facilities for plane handling at Subic Bay. The squadron commander was to provide all facts concerning the incident to the Office of the Governor-General of the Philippines, so that a response could be made to the Tokyo government.

Even though the facilities at Subic Bay were greatly reduced under the Coolidge administration, some ship repair capability remained, including the Dewey Drydock. The Great Kantō earthquake occurred on 30 August 1923, devastating the Yokohama, Japan region. The transport ship Merritt set sail from Subic Bay in 72 hours loaded with Red Cross relief supplies and 200 Filipino nurses.

In the 1930s, a tree-planting program had begun, transforming the naval station into a virtual tropical garden, with streets lined with coconut palms, hibiscus and gardenias. Outside activities and sports were also promoted, with a golf course being laid out where Lowry Hall last stood.

== World War II ==
By the mid-1930s, the Nazis had taken power in Germany and Japan was beginning to flex its military muscle. The United States Congress therefore authorized the release of funds with which to update the Coast Defenses of Manila and Subic Bays. President Franklin D. Roosevelt would complement this by ordering the integration of Filipino military forces into the newly created U.S. Army Forces in the Far East. General Douglas MacArthur, who had been serving as a military advisor to the government of the Commonwealth of the Philippines and was also Field Marshal of the Philippines, was ordered back to active duty with the rank of Lieutenant general with the title of Commander of the United States Army Forces in the Far East.

To prepare for eventual war, Dewey Drydock, which had been at Subic Bay for 35 years, was towed to Mariveles Bay, on the tip of the Bataan Peninsula, and scuttled there on 8 April 1942, to prevent the Japanese from using it.

The 4th Marine Regiment, which had been withdrawn from Shanghai, China, was ordered to withdraw to the Philippines. The first members of the regiment disembarked from President Madison at Subic Bay, early on the morning of 1 November 1941. The remainder arrived on 1 December. The Marines were housed in temporary wooden barracks and in tents at the naval station and the rifle range.

The freshly arrived Marines were assigned to provide land defense for Subic Bay. Seaward defenses included the batteries at Fort Wint on Grande Island and a minefield, which had been laid off the entrance to Subic Harbor. As the Marines built beach defenses, Consolidated PBY-4 Catalinas from VP-101 and VP-102 of Patrol Wing 10, which was stationed at Subic Bay, were conducting daily patrols off Luzon as a response to rumors that the Japanese were approaching the Philippines. On 11 December, seven Catalinas had just returned from patrol when Japanese Zeroes appeared and strafed the aircraft. One ensign was killed and all Catalinas sank to the bottom of Subic Bay's inner basin.

As the Japanese continued their advance through Luzon, telephone and telegraph lines between Manila and Olongapo were sabotaged; as a result, all Japanese in Olongapo were rounded up and turned over to the Provost Marshal. A priest had also been questioning Marines and Filipinos about sensitive matters such as troop positions and strength and after the Marines became suspicious, a search of the priest's belongings was ordered and a shortwave radio was found. The battalion commander immediately convened a hearing and after intense interrogation, the priest confessed to being a member of the German-American Bund and had been a spy for the Japanese. He was then taken behind the church and shot by a Marine firing squad.

By 24 December, the situation at Subic had become hopeless and an order to destroy the station and withdraw was given. All buildings on the station were torched while Filipinos burned the entire town of Olongapo. All that remained on Subic was the former New York, and she was towed into a deep part of the bay and scuttled. All Marines withdrew to Bataan and eventually to Corregidor where they made their last stand.

Fort Wint, under the command of Colonel Napoleon Boudreau of the U.S. Army, was evacuated on 25 December. All equipment and supplies were destroyed. On 10 January 1942, soldiers of the Japanese Imperial Army's 14th Infantry Division marched into Olongapo and on 12 January, the Japanese commandeered native fishing boats to seize Grande Island. Subic Bay Naval Station was established with four companies of soldiers and a company of Kempeitai.

Within one week of the Japanese's occupation, American PT boats at Cavite were ordered to attack a Japanese ship, which was anchored at Subic Bay, that was shelling American positions. PT-31 and PT-34 entered the bay separately. PT-31 suffered engine trouble and ran aground on a reef. She was abandoned and destroyed. PT-34 entered undetected and sunk a 5,000-long-ton (5,100 t) transport that was off-loading supplies. She then came under heavy fire, but managed to escape undamaged. PT-32 was then ordered into Subic Bay and attacked and hit a light cruiser on 1 February. On 17 February, PT-34 made a final, but unsuccessful attack at Subic Bay after which all PT boats were ordered to leave the Philippines.

To protect Subic Bay, the Japanese garrisoned Fort Wint with anti-aircraft artillery and automatic weapons, but did not repair the American guns, nor build permanent fortification. The Japanese then started shipbuilding at Subic Bay and began constructing wooden auxiliary vessels. Several hundred workers from occupied-China and Formosa were brought in as laborers, in addition to 1,000 Filipinos. Nine ships were built and shipped to Cavite for engine installation, however, none of the ships would see active service as they were destroyed by U.S. Navy aircraft.

One of the few buildings that were left standing from the bombing and subsequent torching of the station was the Catholic church. The Japanese removed all religious articles and converted it into a movie theater and was later used to imprison Americans and Filipinos that had been captured. Those who died were buried behind the church, in a common cemetery. When all the prisoners were shipped to Manila, the Japanese used the church as a stable for horses.

On 20 October 1944, four U.S. Army divisions aboard 650 U.S. Navy vessels landed at Palo, Leyte, fulfilling MacArthur's promise to return to the Philippines. On 13 December, the Japanese began evacuating civilians and non-essentials from Manila aboard Ōryoku Maru and four other merchant ships. As the ship was heading for Japan, fighter aircraft from the aircraft carrier Hornet attacked the ships and left hundreds of Japanese dead or wounded. Ōryoku Maru, heavily damaged with destroyed steering gear, pulled into Subic Bay. Throughout the night, the Japanese disembarked while the American and Allied prisoners, that were carried below decks, were left aboard. The next morning, Japanese guards ordered the prisoners to come up on deck. As Navy aircraft began to strafe the ships, the prisoners started frantically running about. As the pilots approached, they recognized the white shapes as Americans or Allies and sharply pulled up, rocking their wings in recognition. Afterwards, the 1,360 surviving Allied prisoners were forced to strip and swim ashore, where they were crowded into a fenced tennis court near the Spanish Gate. Early the next morning, three fighters scored two direct hits on Oryoku Maru and she burst into flames. After burning for two hours, she settled into the water about 100 yards (91 m) off Alava Pier. When the planes had left the Japanese served the prisoners their first meal since leaving Manila two days before: two teaspoons of dry, raw rice. There was only one faucet from which the water trickled out so slowly that a prisoner was lucky if he managed one drink every 18 hours. Roll call was taken each morning. Those that had died during the night were buried in an improvised cemetery next to the seawall. After four days at Subic, only 450 survived the makeshift prison; they were subsequently sent to the labor camps in Japan.

By January 1945, the Japanese had all but abandoned Subic Bay. The U.S. Fifth Air Force had dropped 175 tons of bombs on Grande Island, evoking only light fire from the skeleton Japanese force manning the anti-aircraft guns. The commander of Japanese forces in the Philippines, General Tomoyuki Yamashita, had withdrawn his forces into defensive mountain positions and ordered Colonel Sanenbou Nagayoshi to block Highway 7 near Subic Bay.

On 29 January, 40,000 American troops of the 38th Division and 34th Regimental Combat Team came ashore without resistance at San Antonio, Zambales, by the site of what became known as the San Miguel Naval Communications Station. The column advanced toward Subic Bay, meeting their first resistance at the bridge spanning the Kalaklan River near the Olongapo Cemetery. The Japanese, knowing that they would imminently lose the town, decided to destroy Olongapo. Eventually, the Japanese evacuated the town and the 34th Regiment took over. The following day, Grande Island was taken and Navy minesweepers began clearing the bay. Engineers of the 38th Division remained in Olongapo to begin reactivation of Subic Bay Naval Station. Bridges, buildings and the water distilling plant were repaired and the beaches and streets were cleared. Soon enough, LSTs were making dry-ramp landings near the town of Subic.

While Army engineers were busy around Subic Bay, the remaining troops moved east along Highway 7, planning to cross the base of Bataan to meet elements of the Army's XIV Corps, which were moving west on the same road. On the morning of 31 January 1945, the Americans began climbing the forested hills of Zig Zag Pass and into a hornet's nest of Japanese. In the first three days at Zig Zag Pass the U.S. 152nd had more casualties than during 78 days of combat in Leyte. General Henry L.C. Jones was relieved and command of the 38th was given to General Roy W. Easley who used P-47s for air support. The planes began an intensive strafing and bombing of the jungle and dropped napalm on the Japanese positions. After 15 days of fighting the enemy positions were finally overrun. The Japanese had succeeded in their mission to slow the American advance but lost more than 2,400 troops. American losses had been 1,400 killed.

== After the war ==
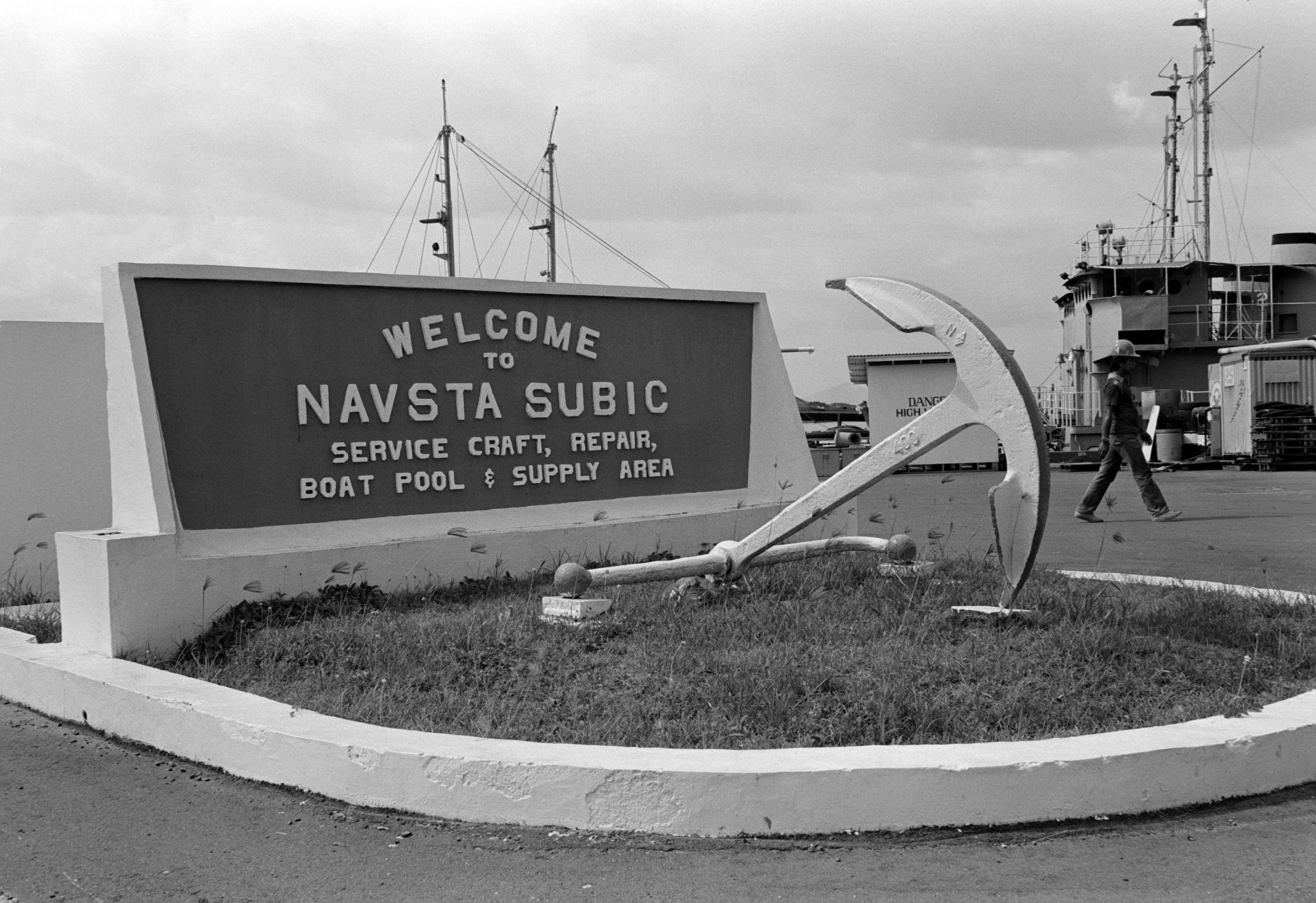
Welcome sign

Subic Bay was designated Naval Advance Unit No. 6, and became a submarine and motor torpedo boat base shortly after the Philippines were liberated. USS Fulton arrived on 11 February 1945 and found Subic Bay " ... a primitive, humid, unhealthy, desolate Siberia far from the pleasant climate, facilities, and girls of Australia... ". A Naval Supply Depot was established at Maquinaya, about 3 miles (5 km) from the main base in July 1945. A new town of Olongapo was built to replace building burned by the retreating Japanese and provide housing for Filipino civilians employed at the base. Olongapo and its 9,000 Filipino residents remained under United States Navy administration when the remainder of the Philippines became independent on 4 July 1946.

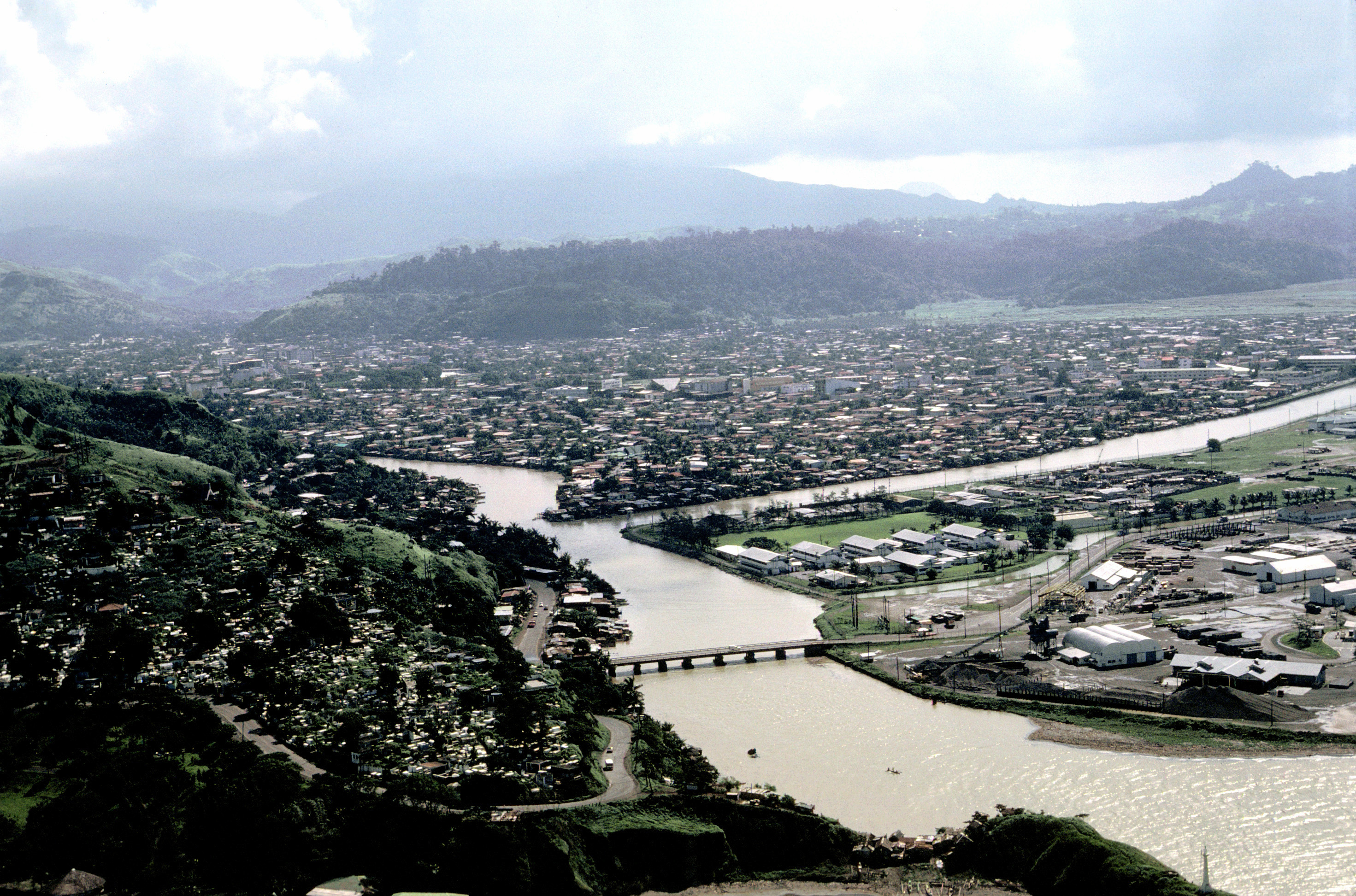
Olongapo and the bridge leading to NS Subic Bay, 1981

== Korean War ==
Construction of Naval Air Station Cubi Point began during the Korean War. The town of Banicain was demolished to build the airfield and its residents were relocated to Olongapo. As Olongapo's population grew to 60,000, the Filipinos requested control of the town. On 7 December 1959, 56,000 acres (23,000 ha) of land with electrical, telephone and water utilities was relinquished to Filipino control. Grande Island was converted to a recreation center for naval personnel; and most of the historic Coastal Artillery guns of Fort Wint were moved to United States coastal defense parks in 1963 and 1968.

== Vietnam War ==
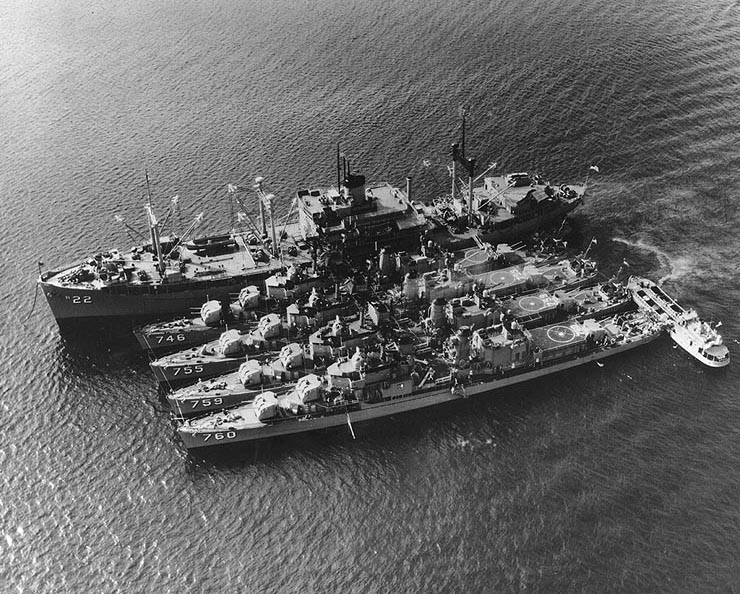
USS Klondike beside: USS Taussig, USS John A. Bole, USS Lofberg and USS John W. Thomason in Subic Bay

The Vietnam War was the period of peak activity as Subic Bay became the U.S. Seventh Fleet forward base for repair and replenishment after the Gulf of Tonkin incident in 1964. The average number of ships visiting the base per month rose from 98 in 1964 to 215 by 1967. The base, with 6 wharves, 2 piers, and 160 mooring points and anchorages had about 30 ships in port, on any given day. Alava pier was extended by 600 feet (180 m) in 1967. The record of 47 ships in port was set in October 1968. About one-third of these were Military Sea Transportation Service ships bringing 45,000 tons of food, ammunition, and supplies and 2 million barrels of fuel oil, aviation gasoline, and JP-4 jet fuel each month including fuels transferred to Clark Air Base via a 41-mile (66 km) pipeline. The Naval Supply Depot maintained an inventory of 200,000 parts. The 4,224,503 sailors visiting Subic Bay in 1967 purchased more than $25 million in duty-free goods from the Navy Exchange.

More than $63 million of construction projects contracted between 1964 and 1968 did not prepare the Ship Repair Facility (SRF) for the increasing workload and emergency peaks generated by the war. American military and civilian population totaled about 4,300; and more than 15,000 Filipino SRF workers worked 12-hour shifts for an average of over 60 hours per week. The physical plant consisted of quonset huts put up after World War II; and workers used obsolete tools and equipment supplemented by machine tools made available by decommissioning the New York Navy Yard. Additional floating drydocks and a third repair ship were assigned from the United States to increase the capabilities of the repair facility.

The fire-ravaged USS Forrestal was repaired in August 1967, before her return to the United States for a complete overhaul. The destroyers USS O'Brien, USS Ozbourn, USS Turner Joy and USS Edson, damaged by North Vietnamese shore batteries, were repaired, as were amphibious assault craft, river patrol boats and other small craft.

The Royal Australian Navy destroyer HMAS Hobart was repaired at Subic following the attack by USAF aircraft on 17 June 1968.

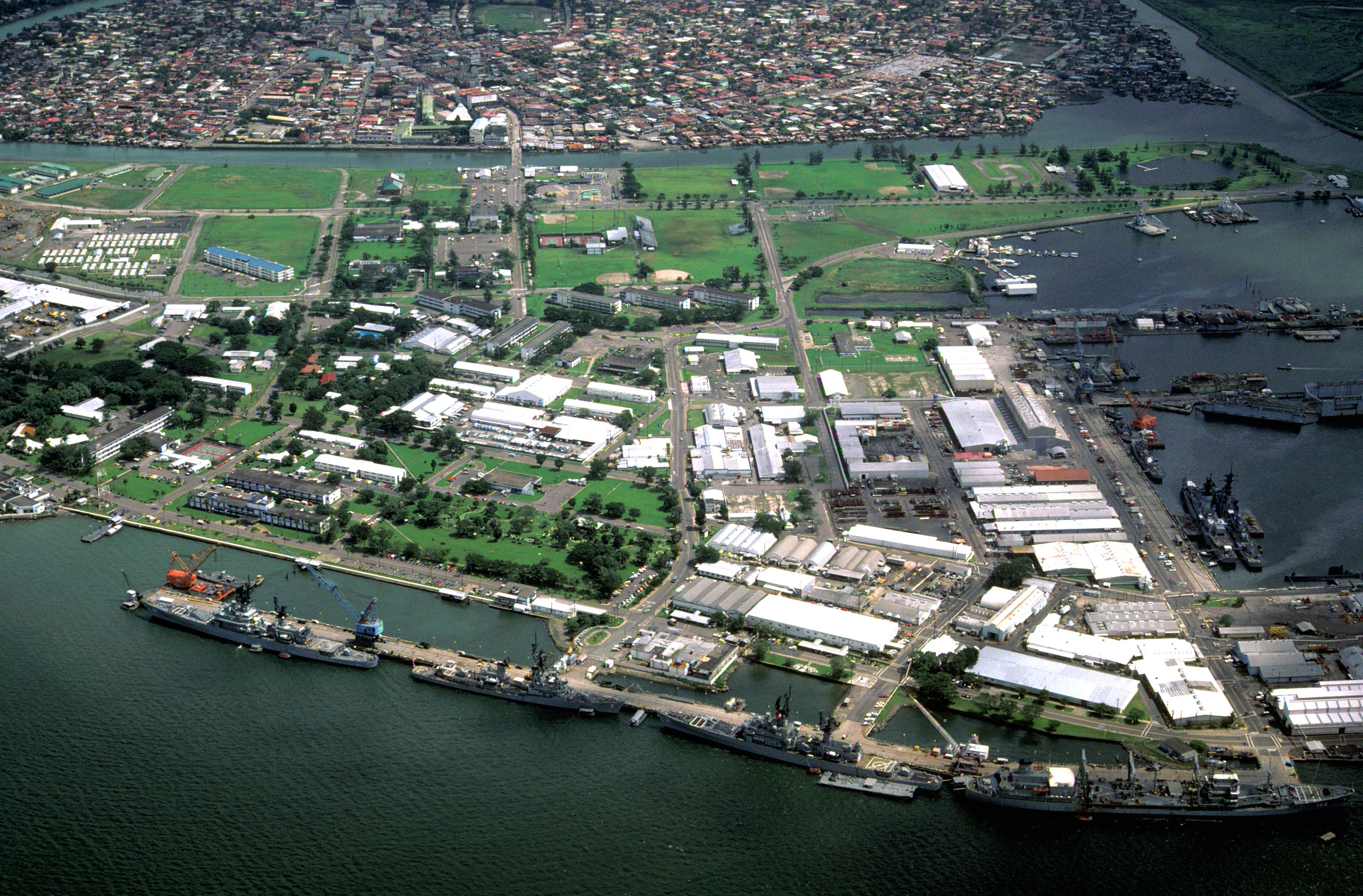
An aerial view of Naval Base Subic Bay, 1981

On 3 June 1969 the Royal Australian Navy carrier HMAS Melbourne was involved in a collision with USS Frank E. Evans about 240 miles (390 km) southwest of Manila. USS Kearsarge brought 196 of the 199 survivors to Subic Bay. A Joint Australian/U.S. Board of Inquiry convened on 9 June in the library of George Dewey High School, the same day the stern section of Frank E. Evans arrived under tow by a tug. It was stripped and towed to sea as a gunnery target.

Harbor Clearance Unit One was activated at Subic Bay in 1966 with the mission of salvaging ships from the rivers and harbors of Vietnam. Two of the biggest jobs were the salvaging of SS Baton Rouge Victory from the Saigon River and the raising of the 170-foot (52 m) dredge Jamaica Bay from the Mỹ Tho River. Both jobs were accomplished despite continuous harassment by enemy sniper fire.

NAS Cubi Point served as the primary maintenance, repair and supply center for the 400-carrier-based-aircraft of the Seventh Fleet's carrier force. The jet engine shop turned out two jet engines a day to keep pace with the demands of the air war in Vietnam.

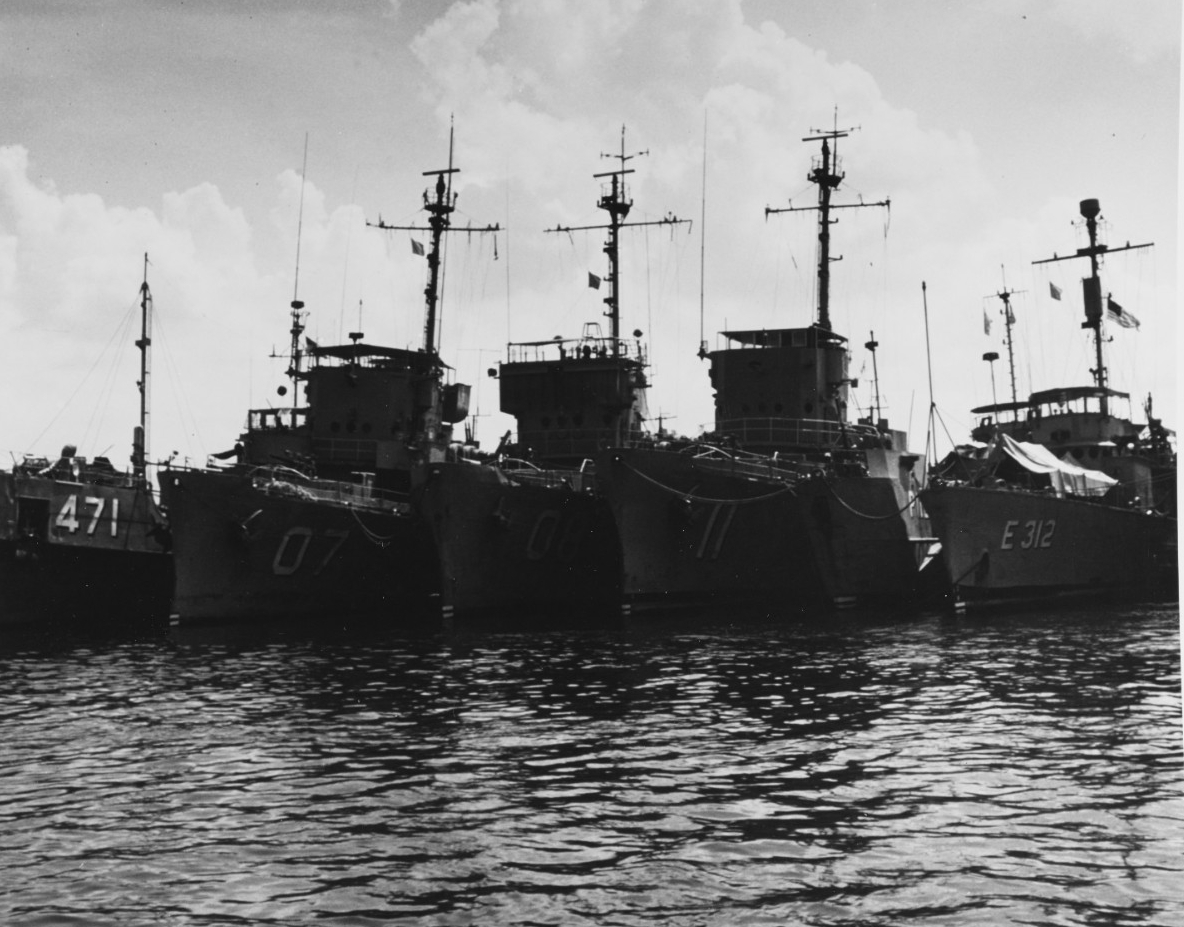
Former South Vietnamese and Cambodian navy ships repatriated, during Frequent Wind, at Subic

Following the Fall of Saigon in 1975, hundreds of thousands of refugees fled South Vietnam, including 32 former U.S. Navy ships that had been given to the Republic of Vietnam Navy, and who the U.S. didn't want falling into the hands of the North. Organized by Richard Armitage, they were led by Captain Paul Jacobs aboard USS Kirk, who escorted them the 1,000 miles (1,600 km) across the South China Sea to Subic. Many of these vessels would be transferred into Filipino Navy service, including the former USS Harnett County (LST-821), still in Filipino service as BRP Sierra Madre.

A temporary processing center was set up on Grande Island, to handle the some 50,000 refugees rescued by the U.S. Navy during the course of Frequent Wind and taken to Subic Bay. They were later taken to the Filipino Refugee Processing Center in Morong, Bataan.

== During the Marcos dictatorship ==
By the time Ferdinand Marcos was inaugurated as the Tenth President of the Philippines on 30 December 1965, the bases agreement between the Philippines and the U.S. was nearly two decades old, and the continued presence of Subic and the other United States bases in the Philippines helped shape the tone of the relationship between the two countries. All five of the American presidents from 1965 to 1985 were unwilling to jeopardize the US–Marcos relationship, mainly because they felt a need to protect and retain the bases, in order to project power in Asia and the Asia-Pacific. Marcos managed to hold on to power for 21 years, despite Martial Law and the many human rights violations perpetuated by his administration, and the negative international press that came with it all, by leveraging the U.S. military's dependence on the bases.

The presence of the bases continued to be rallying points in the First Quarter Storm protests in Manila January to March 1970, alongside the deployment of Filipino troops to the Vietnam War and the economic strain caused by the 1969 Filipino balance of payments crisis and Marcos' debt-driven spending in the leadup to the 1969 presidential campaign

The end of the 1960s had also seen a major diplomatic incident at Subic Naval Base in the form of the 10 June 1969 killing of 21-year-old Filipino laborer Glicerio Amor by U.S. Navy Gunner's Mate 3/E Michael Moomey, who claimed, during his trial, that he had mistaken Amor for a wild boar when he was hunting at the Boton Valley Rifle and Pistol Range while off duty. The Moomey incident, which was eventually adapted into the popular 1976 Filipino film Minsa'y Isang Gamu-gamo, helped the push for the renegotiation of the U.S.-Philippines Bases Treaty at the end of the 1970s.

The Military Bases Agreement of 1947 was amended in 1979, changing the role of the Americans at Subic Bay from landlord to guest. The amendment confirmed Filipino sovereignty over the base and reduced the area set aside for U.S. use from 244 square kilometres (94 sq mi) to 63 square kilometres (24 sq mi). Filipino troops assumed responsibility for the perimeter security of the base, to reduce incidents between U.S. military and Filipino civilians. The unhampered operation of U.S. forces was assured. The U.S. granted the Philippines $500 million in military sales credits and supporting assistance.

== Pinatubo eruption ==
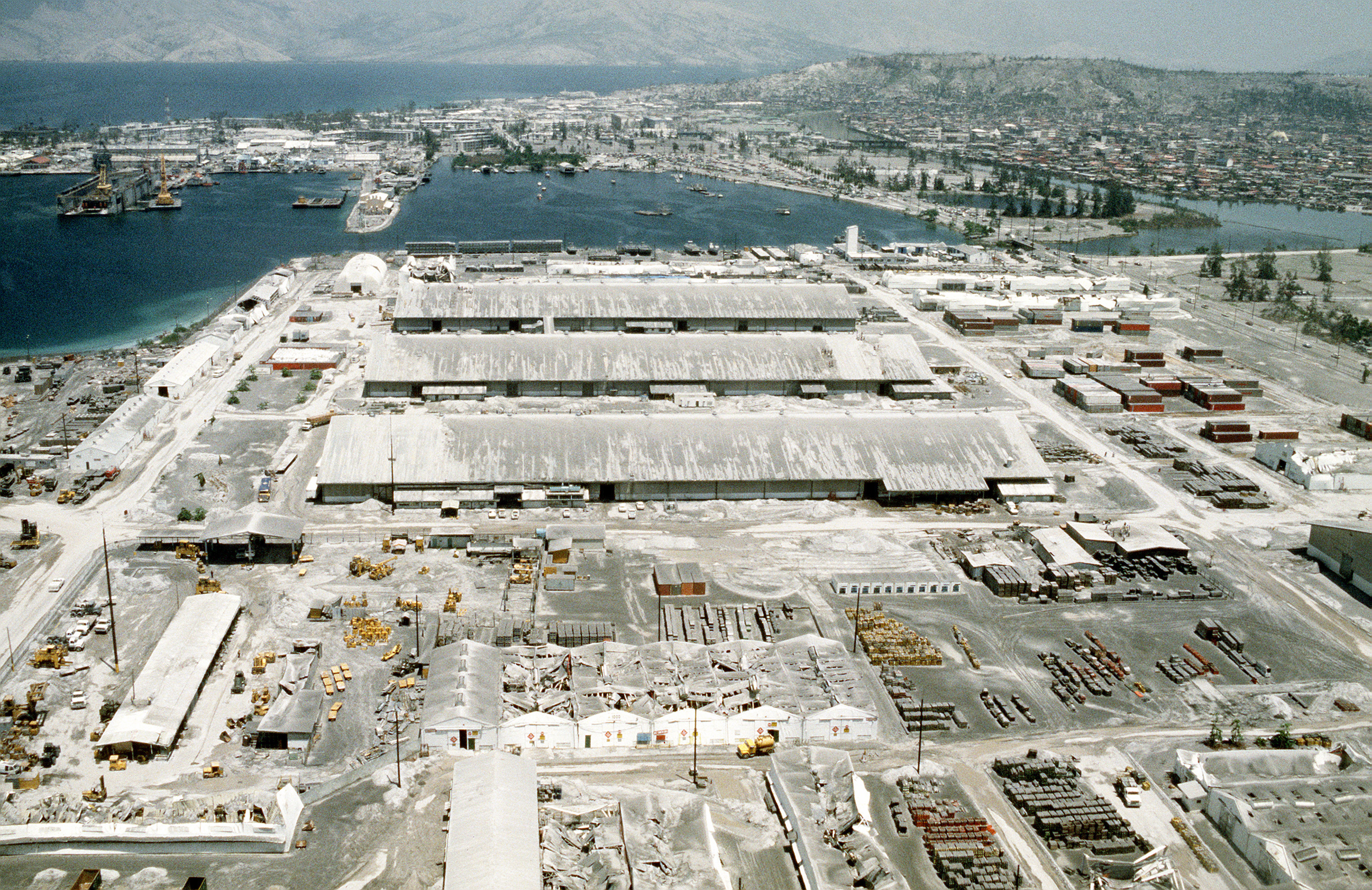
Ash from Mount Pinatubo covers Naval Station Subic Bay

On 15 June 1991, the second largest volcanic eruption of the 20th century occurred when Mount Pinatubo, just 20 miles (32 km) from Subic Bay, exploded with a force eight times greater than the Mount St. Helens eruption. The sun was nearly completely hidden as volcanic ash blotted it out. Volcanic earthquakes and heavy rain, lightning and thunder from Typhoon Yunya passing over northern Luzon resulted in a 36-hour period of complete chaos.

By the morning of 16 June, when the eruption subsided, Subic Bay lay buried under 1 foot (0.30 m) of rain-soaked, sandy ash.

Buildings everywhere collapsed under the weight of the coarse gray ash. Two girls, one a nine-year-old American and the other a Filipino citizen, died when trapped under a falling roof at George Dewey High School. In the city of Olongapo, more than 60 volcano-related deaths were reported, including eight who were crushed when part of Olongapo General Hospital collapsed.

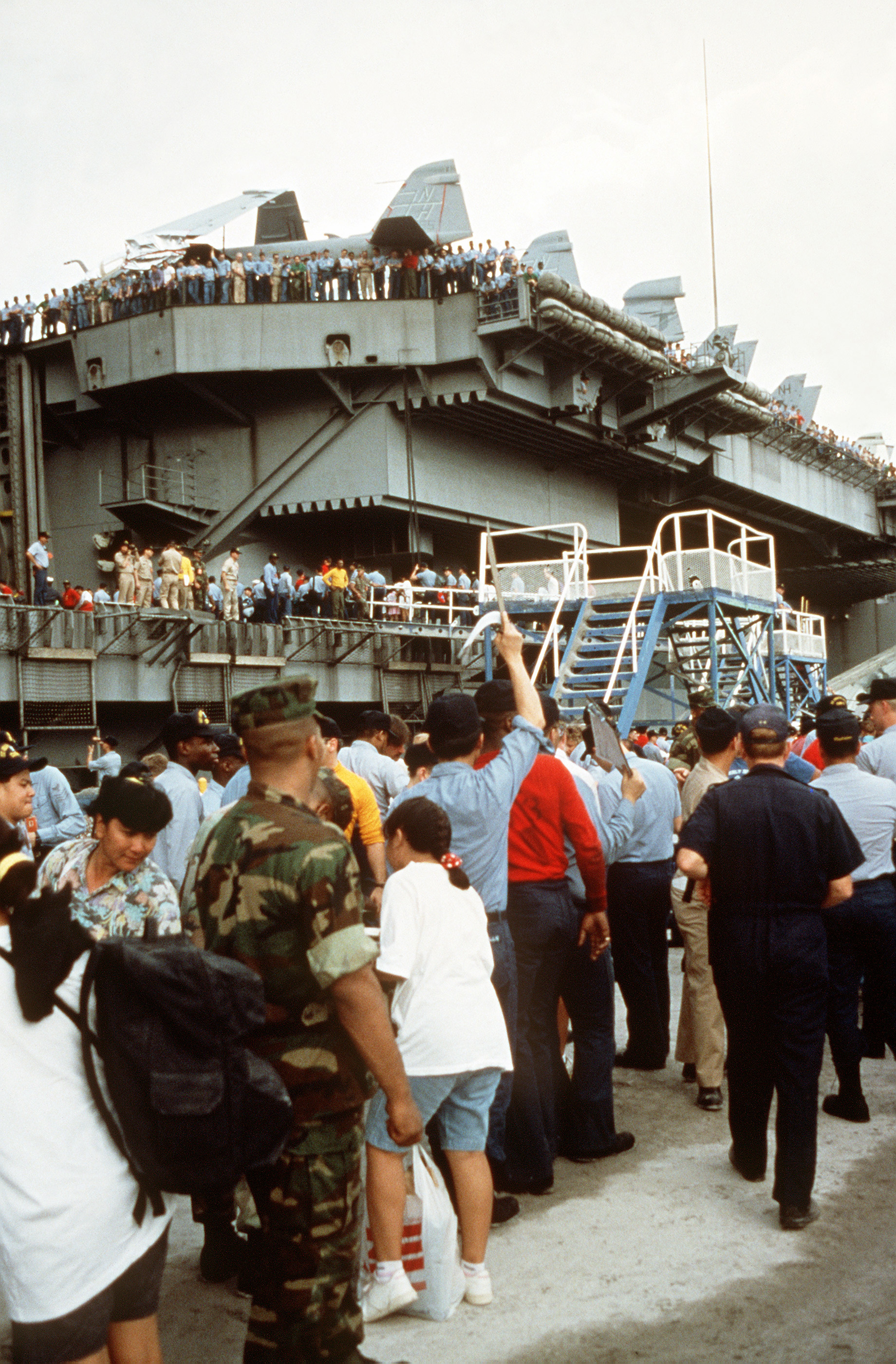
Evacuees board USS Abraham Lincoln

That night, the threat of continued eruptions combined with the lack of water and electricity led to the decision to evacuate all dependents. U.S. warships and cargo planes began the emergency evacuation of thousands of Navy and Air Force dependents. Seven Navy ships sailed Monday, 17 June, with 6,200 dependents. A total of 17 ships, including the aircraft carriers USS Abraham Lincoln and USS Midway, evacuated all 20,000 dependents over the next few days. The evacuees were taken by ship to Mactan Air Base and then were airlifted by U.S. Air Force C-141 Starlifters to Andersen Air Force Base at Guam. After the dependents were evacuated, an intense clean-up was begun. All hands, American service members and Filipino base employees, worked around the clock to restore essential services. Clark Air Base, much closer to Mount Pinatubo, was covered with tons of ash after the eruption. It was declared a total loss and plans for a complete closure were started.

=== Restoration of base ===
Within two weeks, NAS Cubi Point was back in limited operation. Soon, most buildings had electricity and water restored. By mid-July, service had been restored to most family housing units. The dependents began returning 8 September 1991 and, by the end of the month, almost all were back at Subic Bay from the United States. In September 1991, more than twenty thousand Filipino civilians were employed by the base.

== Closure due to disagreements in leasing costs ==
From 1988 to 1992, the U.S. and Filipino governments tried to renegotiate the terms of an extension of the military bases at Subic and Clark. This referred to the Military Bases Agreement of 1947, which was due to expire. Intense negotiations between the governments of the United States and the Philippines began. These negotiations resulted in the Treaty of Friendship, Peace and Cooperation between the United States and the Republic of the Philippines. This would have extended the lease of the American bases in the Philippines. However, in contention was the amount of money that the U.S. government would pay to the Philippine government for the lease and use of the bases.

As per C.R. Anderegg, the deputy commander of Clark Air Base, the Philippines wanted $825 million per year for a period of seven years, but the U.S. government would not budge from the earlier agreed $360 million per year for 10 years. This was not the first such hike demanded by the Philippines; in 1984, a similar hike had been asked and given for Clark Air Base. However, this time, the US government did not agree.

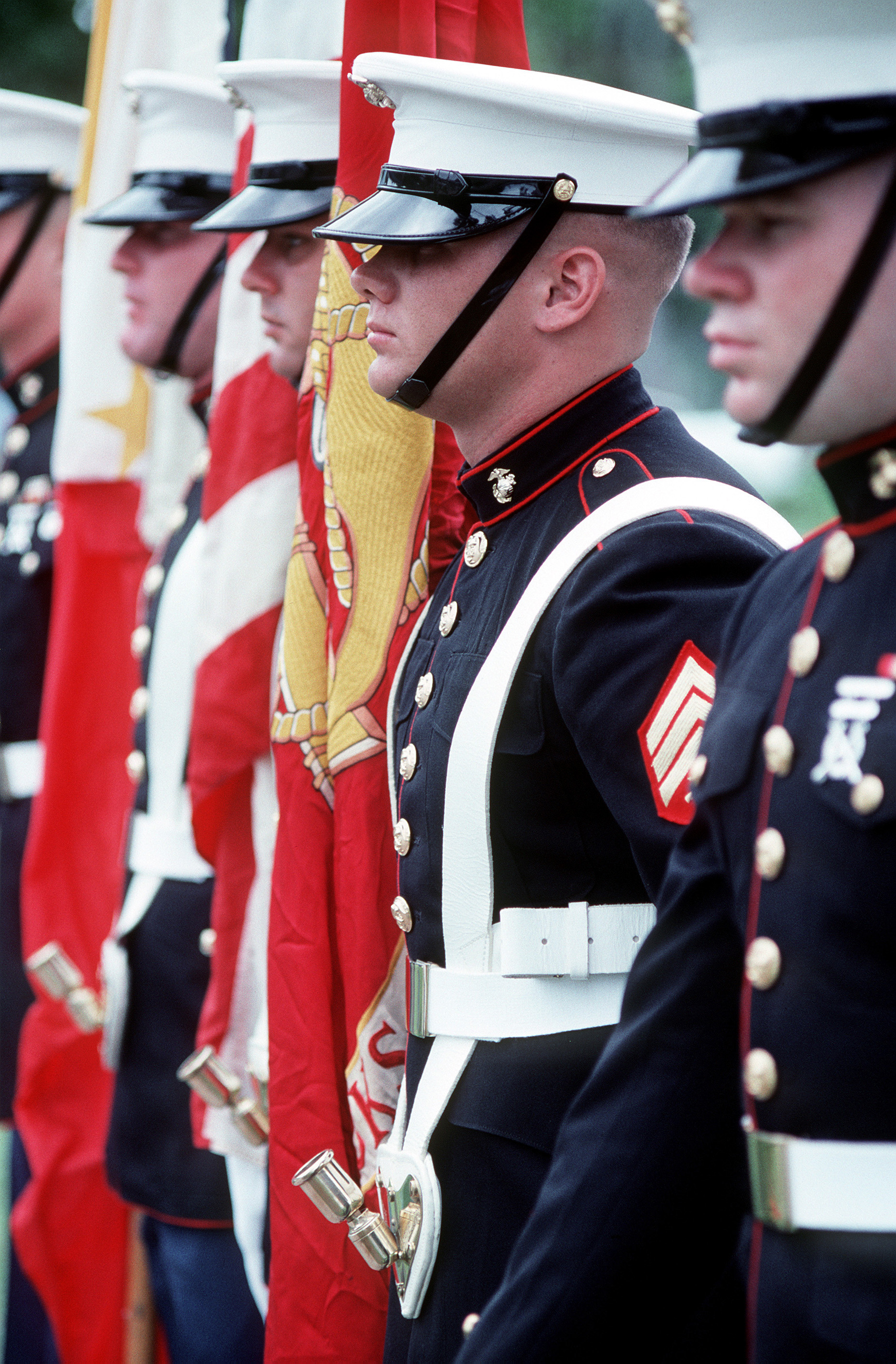
A Marine color guard stands at attention during the deactivation ceremony for Naval station, Subic Bay. Following the ceremony, control of the base will be assumed by the Subic Bay Metropolitan Authority.

On 13 September 1991, the Filipino Senate rejected the ratification of this treaty.

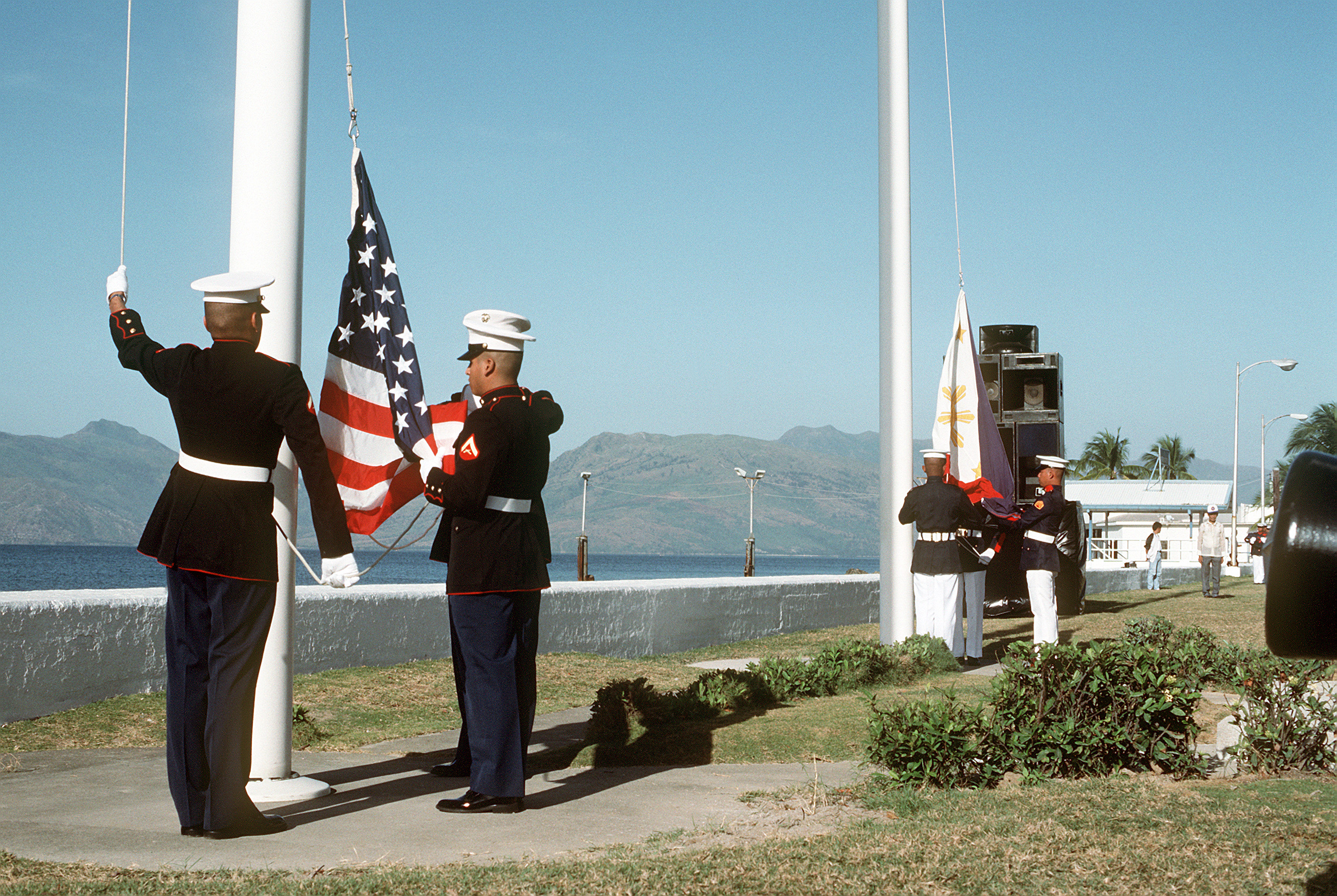
The American flag is lowered and the Filipino one is raised, during turnover of Naval Station Subic Bay

In December 1991, the two governments were again in talks to extend the withdrawal of American forces for three years, but this broke down as the United States refused to detail their withdrawal plans or to answer if it kept nuclear weapons on base. Additionally, the United States offered only one quarter of the $825 million in rent sought by the Filipino government. Finally on 27 December, President Corazon Aquino, who had previously fought to delay the U.S. pullout to cushion the country's battered economy, issued a formal notice for the US to leave by the end of 1992. Naval Station Subic Bay was the US's largest overseas defense facility, after Clark Air Base was closed.

== Conversion into an SEZ and merchant port ==
In 1992, tons of material including drydocks and equipment, were shipped to various Naval Stations. Ship repair, maintenance yards and supply depots were relocated to other Asian countries including Japan and Singapore. On 24 November 1992, the American flag was lowered in Subic for the last time and the last 1,416 Sailors and Marines at Subic Bay Naval Base left by plane from Naval Air Station Cubi Point and by USS Belleau Wood. This withdrawal marked the first time since the 16th century that no foreign military forces were present in the Philippines. The departure of the United States Navy left a huge clean-up to be completed. Soil and water were contaminated with asbestos, PCBs and pesticides. As of 2012, clean-up estimates for Subic Bay Naval Base and Clark Air Base were $40 million each.

Beginning in June 2012, the Filipino government said that the United States military could use the old base with prior approval by the Filipino government. This follows expanded military ties between the two nations and an American pivot towards Asia. This follows a Visiting Forces Agreement made in 1999, that saw annual visits of United States forces to conduct large scale exercises (known as Balikatan) between the two allies. The Sydney Morning Herald reported on 20 November 2012 that Subic Bay will host US ships, Marines and aircraft on a semi-permanent basis which according to analysts will give the US a strategically important force posture for its shift in emphasis to the Pacific.

The US Navy began using the base in Subic Bay in 2015 to deliver materiel and personnel for annual joint military exercises. Some 6,000 US personnel came to Subic in April, and returned for exercises in 2016 in agreement with Filipino authorities. US ships have used Subic Bay as a resupply port, during routine calls.

== Reopening ==
In 2022, the United States and Filipino governments quietly began preparations for U.S. forces to return to the facility amid heightened tensions with China. The portion of Redondo Peninsula which was used by HHIC Phil was acquired by the national government in late 2022 and named a Naval Operation Base (NOB) through the Filipino Navy. After the remainder of the port came up for sale and interest from, at least, two Chinese companies, U.S. private equity firm Cerberus Capital Management acquired the port. On 9 November, U.S. Ambassador MaryKay Carlson visited Subic Bay. On 24 November, a day before the 30^{th} anniversary of the U.S. Navy's departure, Rolen C. Paulino, chairman of the SBMA, said that he would be "very surprised" if Subic Bay does not return to service as a U.S. military facility through the Enhanced Defense Cooperation Agreement, as "during war, time is of the essence".

=== Restoration of Subic Bay Airfield ===
The restoration of Subic Bay Airfield (U.S. Naval Base Subic Bay) with a new forward operating base will host the maritime patrol assets for territorial disputes in the South China Sea operations, including joint warfare in line with the Comprehensive Archipelagic Defense Concept (CADC). Situated along the former Naval Air Station Cubi Point at Naval Base Subic Bay edge, the project will enhance its surveillance aircraft and power projection around the South China Sea. Filipino Air Force documents reveal that it will be established at Subic Bay International Airport, especially since the Armed Forces of the Philippines chose SBIA for "Joint Air-Sea-Land Operations", which can support both attack aircraft and reconnaissance aircraft. In 2022, the government established Naval Operating Base Subic, the 100-hectare northern yard of which is occupied by the Filipino Navy.

== Commanders ==
This is the official list of Base Commanders who served the Subic Naval Base from 1945 to 1992. Base commanders prior to 1945 are not included.

=== Spanish Period ===
No.	Commander	Branch	Year
1	RAdm. Patricio Montojo y Pasarón	Spanish Navy	1899

=== United States Naval Base ===
No.	Commander	Branch	Term start	Term end	Time in office
-	Capt. John Twiggs Myers	United States Navy	December 1899	December 1899	less 1 month
	Capt. Herbert L. Draper	United States Marine Corps	-	-	-
1	Capt. Harry Nelson Coffin	United States Navy	October 1945	January 1956	10 years, 3 months
2	RAdm. Glynn R. Donaho	United States Navy	January 1956	August 1957	1 year, 7 months
3	RAdm. Roobert Taylor Scott Keith	United States Navy	August 1957	February 1959	1 year, 6 months
4	RAdm. Arthur F. Spring	United States Navy	February 1959	November 1960	1 year, 9 months
5	Capt. E.H. Maher	United States Navy	November 1960	January 1961	3 months
6	RAdm. Charles K. Duncan	United States Navy	January 1961	March 1962	1 year, 2 months
7	RAdm. Reuben T. Whitaker	United States Navy	March 1962	June 1964	3 years, 4 months
8	RAdm. Donald T. Baer	United States Navy	August 1964	September 1966	2 years, 1 month
9	RAdm. Fillmore B. Gilkeson	United States Navy	September 1966	June 1968	2 years, 3 months
10	RAdm. Valdemar Greene Lambert	United States Navy	June 1968	June 1970	2 years
11	RAdm. William H. Shawcross	United States Navy	July 1970	June 1971	1 year, 11 months
12	RAdm. George R. Muse	United States Navy	June 1971	April 1972	9 months
13	RAdm. John Henry Dick	United States Navy	April 1972	March 1973	11 months
14	RAdm. Doniphan B. Shelton	United States Navy	March 1973	August 1975	2 years, 5 months
15	RAdm. Thomas J. Kilcline Sr.	United States Navy	August 1975	December 1977	2 years, 4 months
16	RAdm. Huntington Hardisty	United States Navy	December 1977	December 1979	3 years
17	RAdm. Lee E. Levenson	United States Navy	December 1979	August 1981	1 year, 8 months
18	RAdm. Richard M. Dunleavy	United States Navy	August 1981	August 1982	1 year
19	RAdm. Dickinson Smith	United States Navy	August 1982	July 1984	1 year, 11 months
20	RAdm. Edwin Rudy Kohn	United States Navy	1984	1986	2 years
21	RAdm. Theodore Lewin	United States Navy	1986	1988	2 years
22	RAdm. Roger Lee Rich	United States Navy	1988	1990	2 years
23	RAdm. Thomas Mercer	United States Navy	1990	1992	2 years

=== Filipino Navy ===
Since 2022, the Filipino Navy acquisition of HHIC Phil facilities started to reactivate the base on Redondo Peninsula within Subic Bay. Currently, the Naval Operating Base (N.O.B.) is supervised by the Naval Installation Command.

== See also ==
Other former United States Navy installations:

- Naval Air Station Cubi Point
- U.S. Naval Hospital, Subic Bay
- U.S. Naval Radio Facility Bagobantay
- U.S. Naval Station Sangley Point
- San Miguel Naval Communications Station
- Mount Santa Rita Naval Link Station
- U.S. Bases in the Philippines
  - U.S. Naval Bases in the Philippines
    - U.S. Naval Advance Bases

== Sources ==
- Anderson, G. R. Subic Bay From Magellan to Pinatubo (2009) Gerald Anderson ISBN 978-1-4414-4452-3
- Wright, C. C. (2004). "Question 40/02: Submarines Expended as Targets 1922". Warship International. XLI (4): 353–354. ISSN 0043-0374.
