= USS Caesar =

Collier of the United States Navy

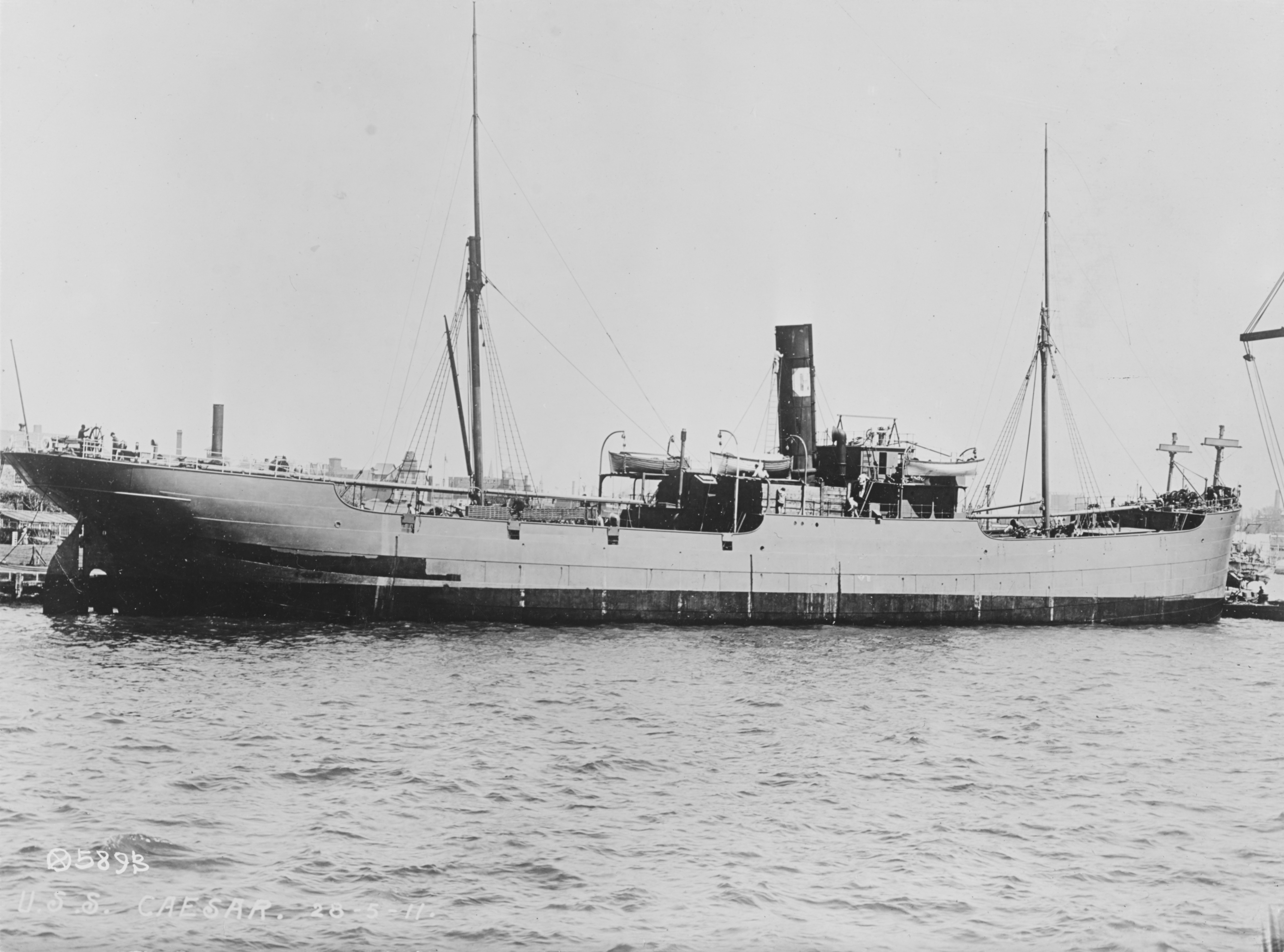
- USS Caesar in port, perhaps when fitting out for US Navy service in 1898

History
- Name: 1896: Kingtor; 1898: USS Caesar; 1923: Mogul; 1935: Mogul Maru
- Owner: 1896: J Holman & Sons; 1898: US Navy; 1923: Coastwise SS & Barge Co; 1934: Gen Nav Co of Canada, Ltd
- Port of registry: 1896: (United Kingdom) London; 1898: (United States); 1923: (Canada) Victoria, BC
- Builder: Ropner & Sons, Stockton
- Yard number: 317
- Launched: 31 January 1896
- Completed: February 1896
- Acquired: by US Government, 21 April 1898
- Commissioned: into US Navy: 13 May 1898, 27 December 1904
- Decommissioned: from US Navy: 23 May 1904, 11 June 1922
- Identification: 1898: pennant number: AC-16; by 1914: call sign NCY; 1923–34: official number 105797; 1923–33: code letters MFVR
- Fate: Scrapped 1935

General characteristics
- Type: collier
- Tonnage: 2,738 GRT, 1,828 NRT
- Displacement: 5,920 long tons (6,010 t)
- Length: 310.0 ft (94.5 m)
- Beam: 44.0 ft (13.4 m)
- Draft: 19 ft 7 in (5.97 m)
- Depth: 20.5 ft (6.2 m)
- Installed power: 241 NHP
- Propulsion: triple-expansion engine
- Speed: 10 knots (19 km/h; 12 mph)
- Complement: in US Navy: 98
- Armament: in US Navy: 2 × 3-pounder guns

USS Caesar (AC-16) was a collier that was built in England in 1896 and scrapped in Japan in 1935. She was launched as Kingtor for a British shipping company, served in the United States Navy as Caesar from 1898 to 1923, and then was sold to a Canadian shipping company who renamed her Mogul.

In the US Navy she served in the Spanish–American War, Philippine–American War and First World War. She is notable for having been one of the ships which in 1905–06 towed the floating dry dock USS Dewey from the United States via the Suez Canal to the Philippines.

== Building and British service ==
Ropner & Sons built Kingtor at Stockton-on-Tees, County Durham, England. She was launched on 31 January 1896 and completed that February. Her registered length was 310.0 ft (94.5 m), her beam was 44.0 ft (13.4 m) and her depth was 20.5 ft (6.2 m). Her tonnages were 2,738 GRT, 1,828 NRT and 5,920 long tons (6,010 t).

Kingtor had a three-cylinder triple-expansion steam engine. It was rated at 241 NHP and gave her a speed of about 10 knots (19 km/h; 12 mph).

Kingtor's first owner was J Holman & Sons, who registered her in London.

== US Navy service ==
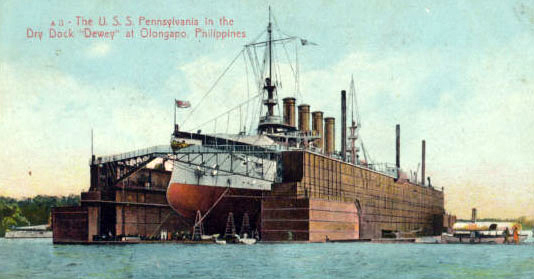
The floating dry dock USS Dewey in Olongapo in 1906 or 1907, with the battleship USS Pennsylvania

On 21 April 1898 the United States declared war on Spain. On the same day, the United States Government bought Kingtor. New York Navy Yard fitted her out, and on 13 May 1898 she was commissioned as USS Caesar. Her pennant number was AC-16 and her first commander was Lt Cdr AB Speyers.

Caesar sailed from Lambert's Point, Virginia on 1 June 1898 laden with coal for the North Atlantic Squadron then blockading Cuba and Puerto Rico in the Spanish–American War. She continued to carry fuel for this force until 8 July 1900, when she left Norfolk, Virginia, on the first of four voyages to the Far East. Sailing via the Suez Canal, Caesar brought cargo to ships taking part in the Philippine–American War, and helped to establish bases in the new US territory. In July 1903 Caesar returned to duty with the North Atlantic Fleet until decommissioned at Norfolk Navy Yard on 23 May 1904. On 27 December 1904 Caesar was recommissioned. She took equipment and supplies for the solar eclipse expedition of 1905 to Valencia, Spain. At the end of the scientific program, she returned the equipment to Norfolk on 13 October 1905. While out of commission at Norfolk from 28 October to 4 November 1905, Caesar was fitted with towing machinery. She then joined the stores ship Glacier, collier Brutus, and tug Potomac in towing the floating dry dock Dewey via the Suez Canal to Olongapo, Luzon, a voyage that took from 28 December 1905 to 10 July 1906. This remains one of seafaring's great towing achievements.

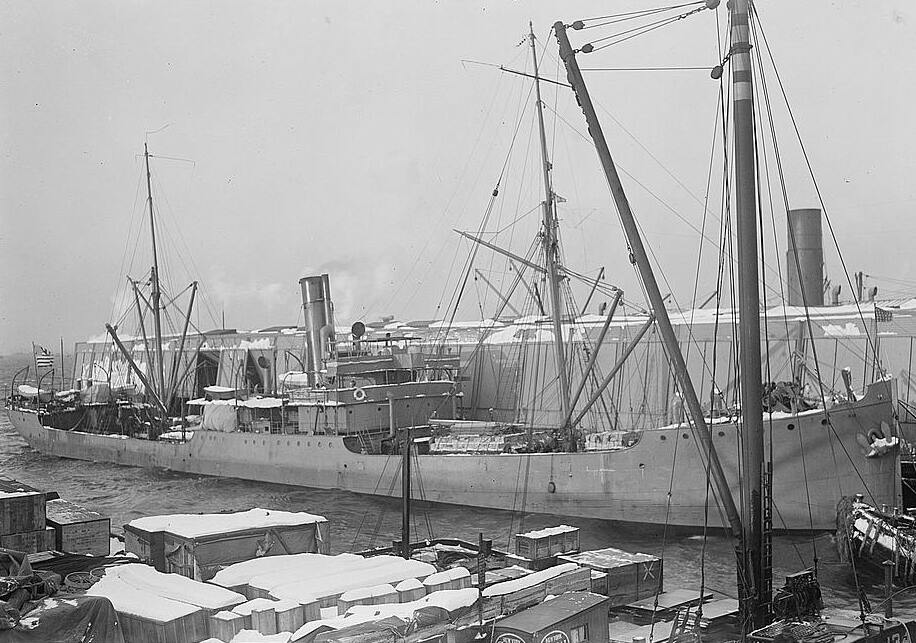
USS Caesar between 1915 and 1920

By 1914 Caesar was equipped for wireless telegraphy. Her call sign was NCY.

Caesar sailed to the Mediterranean from October 1915 until April 1916 and from July until September 1916. On her first, she carried 135 refugees from Jaffa to Alexandria, Egypt. Leaving New York for the Mediterranean once more on 19 December 1916, Caesar delivered Red Cross relief supplies for Syria at Alexandria, then sailed on to Olongapo. She carried cargo and passengers for the Asiatic Fleet until August 1918, when she sailed for the Panama Canal and Norfolk, arriving on 26 October. Three days later she sailed for France with US Army cargo, returning to Norfolk on 26 February.

East coast operations preceded an extensive overhaul at Norfolk which began in September 1920. From May 1921 she resumed transporting coal and other supplies between the east and west coasts, and on 11 March 1922 she left Hampton Roads on her last voyage. After carrying cargo through the Panama Canal to Tutuila, American Samoa, she went to Mare Island Navy Yard, where she was decommissioned on 11 June and sold on 22 December.

== Canadian service and fate ==
The Coastwise Steamship and Barge Company of Canada bought Caesar, renamed her Mogul and registered her in Victoria, British Columbia. In Canadian service her United Kingdom official number was 105797 and her code letters were MFVR. The General Navigation Company of Canada bought her in 1934, and sold her for scrap in 1935. On 20 June 1935 she reached Yokohama, where she was broken up.

== Sources ==
- "Caesar". Dictionary of American Naval Fighting Ships. Naval History & Heritage Command (NH&HC).
