= USS Glacier (AF-4) =

Cargo ship of the United States Navy

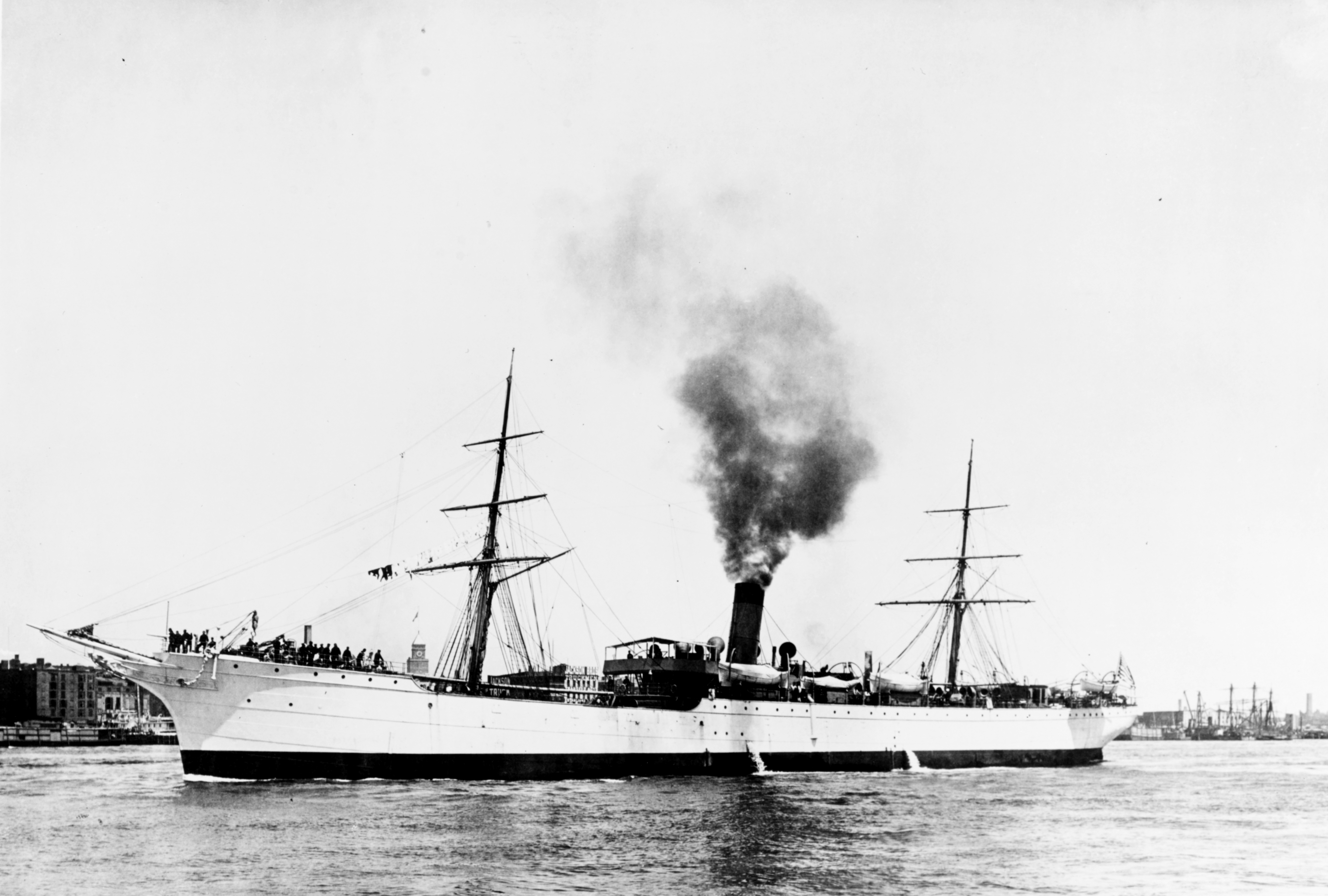

History

United States
- Laid down: 1891 as SS Port Chalmers
- Launched: 1891
- Acquired: 1898
- Commissioned: as USS Delmonico, 5 July 1898; renamed USS Glacier, 11 July 1898
- Decommissioned: 5 March 1899
- In service: 31 March 1899
- Out of service: 6 March 1922
- Stricken: date unknown
- Fate: Sold for scrapping, 17 August 1922

General characteristics
- Displacement: 8,325 t.
- Length: 388 ft 7 in (118.44 m)
- Beam: 46 ft 1 in (14.05 m)
- Draught: 25 ft 4 in (7.72 m)
- Propulsion: system unknown
- Speed: 12.3 kts.
- Complement: 98
- Armament: four 3" guns

USS Glacier (AF-4) was a Glacier-class stores ship acquired by the U.S. Navy for use in the Spanish–American War. She served again during World War I in the dangerous North Atlantic Ocean, delivering general goods and ammunition to American Expeditionary Force troops in Europe.

== Acquisition for Spanish–American War service ==
The first Navy ship to be named Glacier was built as the merchant ship, SS Port Chalmers in 1891 by J.L. Thompson & Son, Sunderland, England; purchased from the Federal Line, London, July 1898; commissioned at New York 5 July 1898, Comdr. J. P. Merrill, USN, commanding; had her name changed to USS Delmonico 6 July 1898, and to USS Glacier 6 days later.

Glacier departed Hampton Roads 15 August, and for the following 5 months she supplied ice, meat, and stores to ships of the North Atlantic Fleet operating in the West Indies during the Spanish–American War. Sailing from San Juan, Puerto Rico, 3 January 1899, she arrived at New York 1 week later, and decommissioned there 6 March.

== Philippine Islands support operations ==
Glacier recommissioned at New York 31 March 1899, assigned to the Asiatic Station, she stood out of Hampton Roads 24 May and arrived 15 July at Manila Bay via the Mediterranean and Suez Canal. Operating in the Philippines during these troubled years, she supplied U.S. Army and Navy forces with ice, meat, and stores; delivered stores to reconstructed gunboats at Hong Kong; and transported large quantities of meat and provisions from Australia to Manila. Sailing out of Manila Bay 22 April 1903, Glacier arrived at Norfolk, Virginia, 29 June, and decommissioned there 1 August.

== Additional turn-of-the-century assignments ==
Recommissioning there 15 December, she loaded supplies and provisions at New York and delivered her cargo to ships at Guantanamo, Pensacola, Florida, and the Panama Canal Zone (14 February – 7 July 1904). Arriving at Boston, Massachusetts, 17 July, Glacier decommissioned there on the 30th and, following repairs, recommissioned 15 September and fitted out for special duty.

== Continued Philippine Islands assignment ==
Glacier became a unit of the Special Service Squadron composed of Brutus (AC-15), Caesar (AC-16), and Potomac (AT-50), assigned to tow the floating dry dock Dewey (YFD-1) from Sparrows Point, Maryland, to the Philippines. Departing Solomons, Maryland, on the Patuxent River 28 December 1905, the squadron arrived at Olongapo, Philippines, via Las Palmas in the Canaries, Port Said, Suez, and Singapore, 10 July 1906. Following delivery of the dock, Glacier proceeded to Cavite for discharge of cargo and repairs. She stood out of Cavite 16 August, and arrived at Boston, Massachusetts, 14 November via the Suez Canal, the Mediterranean, and New York.

== Assigned to the Atlantic Fleet ==
Departing Boston 4 January 1907, Glacier became a unit of the Atlantic Fleet, and engaged in supplying fresh provisions to ships operating in the Atlantic and Caribbean area until returning to New York 14 October.

== Transferred to the Pacific Fleet ==
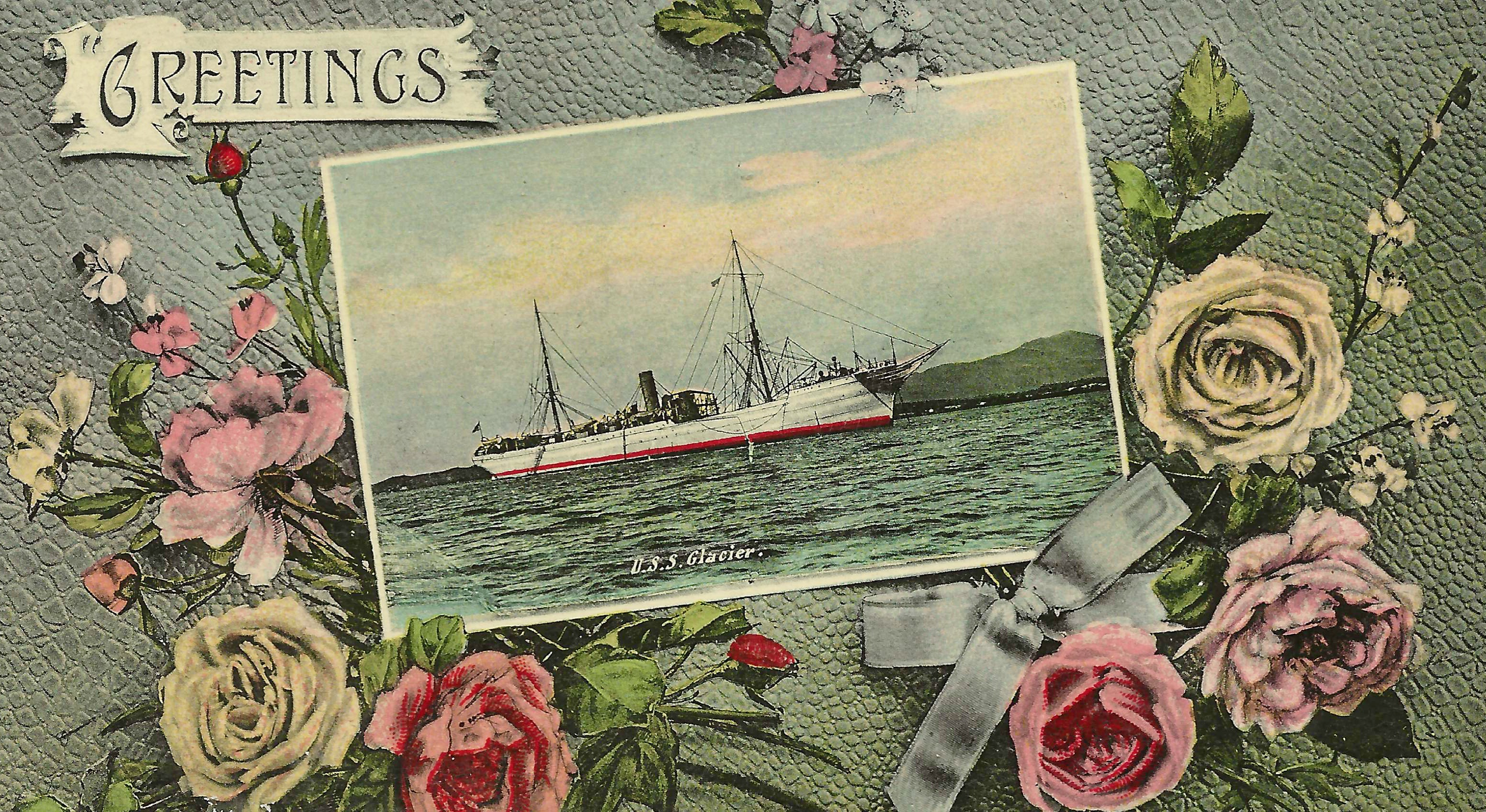
USS Glacier 1908 postcard

As a storeship, she departed New York 5 December and accompanied the Atlantic Fleet on its good will and training cruise to the Pacific, stopping at various ports in the Caribbean, South America, and Mexico en route. Arriving 14 April 1908 at San Francisco, Glacier cruised with the fleet on the California coast until departing San Francisco, California, 29 June. She continued as supply ship to the Atlantic Fleet on its famous voyage around the world, visiting Honolulu, the Fiji Islands, New Zealand, Australia, and the Philippines. On 21 October, while at Cavite, she became detached from the Atlantic Fleet and assigned to the Pacific Fleet in her former capacity. The Commander in Chief of the Atlantic Fleet reports in 1908:

"The storeships Culogoa (1889) and Glacier have been in constant attendance on the fleet, and have most successfully met all demands upon them. They have made the fleet absolutely independent of the local resources at the ports visited, which was necessary in view of the large number of men to be subsisted."

Loading provisions at Manila and Sydney, Australia (10 November-5 December), Glacier joined the U.S. Pacific Fleet at Talcahuano, Chile, 1 January 1909, and accompanied the fleet on a cruise to South and Central American ports and to Magdalena Bay. They arrived at Mare Island 2 June for repairs.

== World War I operations ==
Continuing in her service as supply ship to the Pacific Fleet until 1918, Glacier was employed in delivering fresh provisions, stores, ammunition, target material, and mail; transporting personnel; and towing target rafts and coal barges. Her principal area of operations was on the U.S. West Coast, Mexico, and Central America. She made two trips to Asiatic waters (22 September 1909 – 14 February 1910 and 8 April – 17 August 1912) to supply ships operating in the Hawaiian area, the Philippines, and the China and Japan coasts. From 1913 to 1917 she operated between California and Mexico and Nicaragua, delivering stores, mail and men to the Fleet, investigating conditions at Mexican ports, and giving refuge to United States and other foreign citizens during the unsettled conditions in Mexico. She loaded stores, fresh meats, and ammunition at San Francisco 9 to 14 May 1917, arrived 30 June at Rio de Janeiro and, through March 1918, delivered her cargo to ships operating on the east coast of South America.

== Delivering food and stores to U.S. troops in Europe ==
Departing Rio de Janeiro 2 April, Glacier arrived at New York on the 24th, and became assigned to NOTS. As a Naval Overseas Transport Ship, she made three trips to Europe carrying fresh meats and general stores to naval forces operating in European waters. The first two trips were made from New York to the British Isles, 2 June-26 July 1918 and 13 August-20 October 1918, and the third trip from New York to Brest, 4 November 1918 – 4 January 1919, returning to Norfolk, Virginia, with a cargo of aviation material and high explosives for New York.

Standing in at New York 10 January 1919, she was detached from NOTS and assigned to the Train Squadron, Atlantic Fleet. From 6 May to 25 June 1919, she issued stores to the Atlantic Fleet and engaged in target practice with the fleet on the East Coast.

== Reassigned back to the Pacific ==
Glacier departed New York 24 July, arrived 17 August at San Pedro, California, and became attached to the Train Squadron, Pacific Fleet. Until 1921 she was engaged in transporting stores, ammunition, and personnel to ships operating off the California coast and Panama Canal Zone area.

== Final decommissioning ==
Arriving 31 October 1921 at Mare Island, Glacier decommissioned there 6 March 1922 and was sold 17 August to Barde Steel & Machinery Co., Seattle, Washington, for $22,000.
