= USS Dewey (YFD-1) =

United States Navy floating dry dock

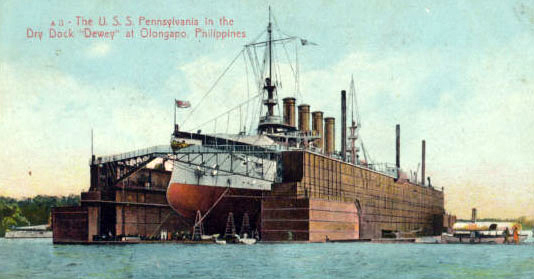
- USS Pennsylvania in drydock Dewey, c. 1906–1907

History

United States
- Name: USS Dewey
- Namesake: Admiral George Dewey
- Builder: Maryland Steel Co.
- Cost: $1,127,000
- Laid down: early 1905
- Launched: 10 June 1905
- Sponsored by: Miss Endicott, daughter of Rear Admiral Mordecai T. Endicott
- Reclassified: YFD-1, 20 July 1920
- Honours and awards: 1 Battle star
- Fate: Scuttled at Mariveles, 1942; raised by Japanese; resunk by U.S. forces

General characteristics
- Displacement: 18,500 t.
- Length: 501 ft 9 in (152.93 m)
- Beam: 100 ft (30.5 m)
- Draft: 6 ft 6 in (1.98 m) (empty)

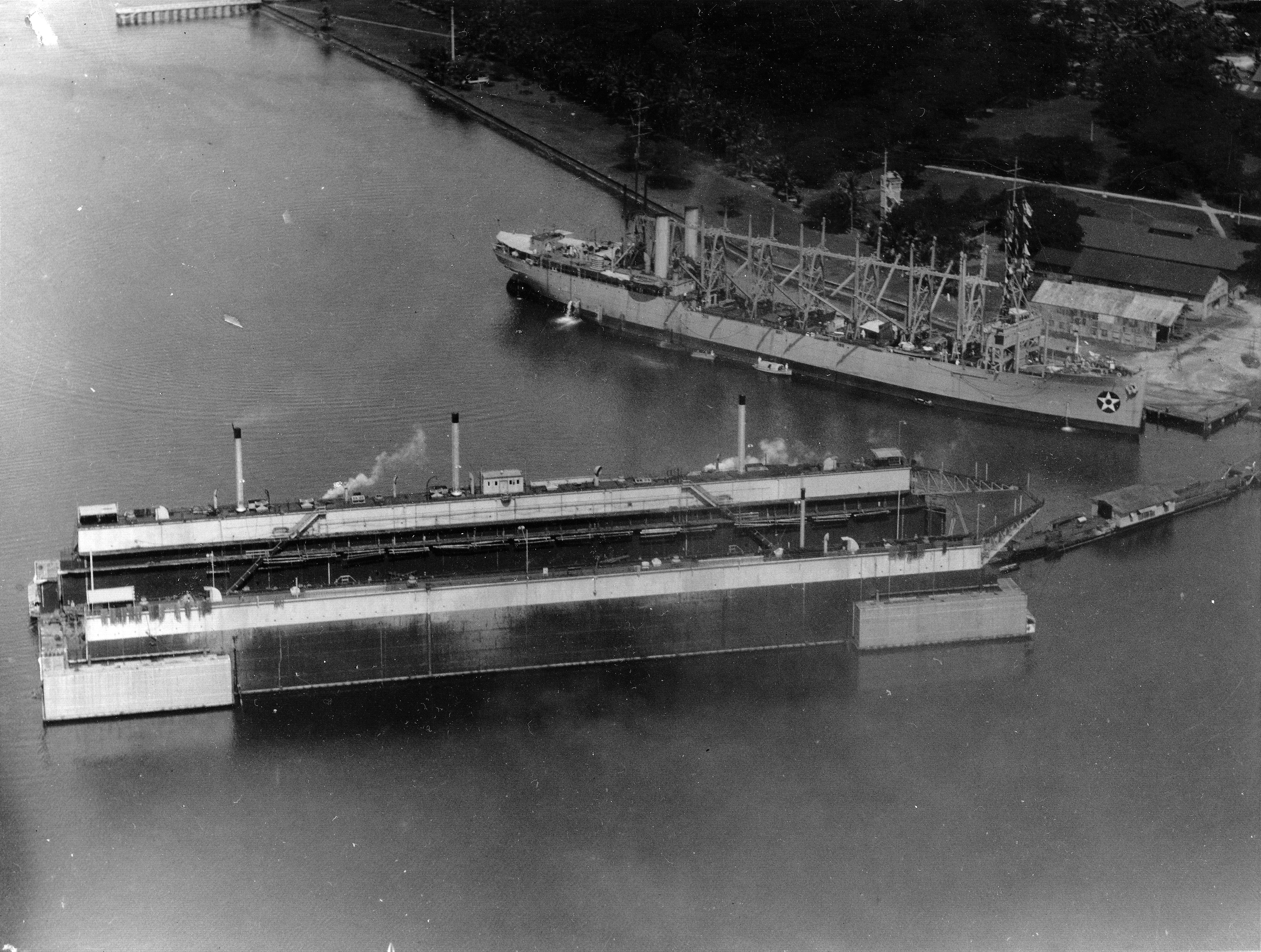
Empty Dewey drydock with USS Jason in background in 1928

USS Dewey (YFD-1) was a floating dry dock built for the United States Navy in 1905, and named for American Admiral George Dewey. The auxiliary floating drydock was towed to her station in the Philippines in 1906 and remained there until scuttled by American forces in 1942, to prevent her falling into the hands of the invading Japanese.

== History ==
Laid down in early 1905 at Maryland Steel Co. of Sparrows Point, Maryland, Dewey was floated for the first time on 10 June 1905. She was christened on that date with the traditional bottle of wine by Miss Endicott, the daughter of U.S. Navy Chief of Yards Mordecai T. Endicott. Dewey was very large and state of the art at her time. Dewey was 500 feet (150 m) in length, had a beam width of 132 feet (40 m), and a working deck surface 100 feet (30 m) wide. The sidewalls reached 42 feet (13 m) above the deck. She displaced 18,500 tons empty. She had a draft of from 6.5 to 8 feet (2.0 to 2.4 m). Ballast pontoons tanks were flooded with water to submerge or pumped dry to raise the ship. The 14-foot (4.3 m) wide sidewalls contained crew barrack, officer stateroom cabins for officers, two mess halls, machine shops, and a steam plant to run the pumps.

On 28 December 1905, Dewey began a journey to her station in the Philippines under tow by colliers Caesar and Brutus, stores ship Glacier, and tug Potomac. The cruiser Tacoma helped in towing for part of the convoy. Leaving Solomons, Maryland on the Patuxent River, the convoy sailed to Olongapo, Philippines, via Las Palmas in the Canary Islands; Port Said, Egypt; the Suez Canal; and Singapore. They arrived at their destination U.S. Naval Base Subic Bay on 10 July 1906. This constituted the world's longest tow job at the time.

Dewey was put into service in the U.S. Naval Base Subic Bay at Olongapo and remained active through World War I and the interwar years. Dewey sank 24 May 1910 while receiving a torpedo boat but was raised undamaged on 29 June and put back in service. After the outbreak of World War II, Dewey was moved to Mariveles, Bataan, when the U.S. forces retreated to that peninsula. As the reality of the situation of the U.S. forces became apparent, several undamaged ships, including Dewey, were ordered scuttled to prevent them from falling into the hands of the Japanese. On 8 April 1942, Dewey's docking officer, Lt. C. J. Weschler, scuttled the drydock. Three damaged ships were also scuttled with Dewey during the Battle of Bataan; the submarine tender Canopus and the minesweeper Bittern and the tugboat Napa.

She was later raised by the Japanese and towed to Manila Bay, but was sunk again by Allied forces. American Grumman TBF Avenger torpedo bombers attacked her on 12 and 13 November 1944, ending her 35 years of service.

Dewey earned one battle star for her World War II service.
