= USS Brutus =

Collier of the United States Navy

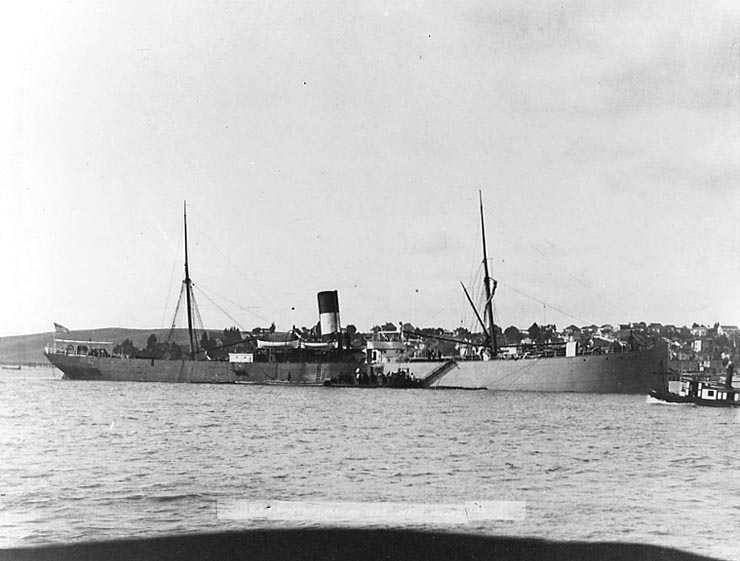
- USS Brutus being repainted into wartime grey, 28 May 1898.

History

United States
- Name: USS Brutus
- Namesake: Marcus Junius Brutus
- Builder: John Readhead & Sons
- Launched: February 1894
- Acquired: 1898
- Commissioned: 27 May 1898
- Decommissioned: 17 August 1921
- Stricken: 29 July 1922
- Fate: Sold 1920, scrapped 1922

General characteristics
- Displacement: 6,550 tons
- Length: 332 ft 6 in (101.35 m)
- Beam: 41 ft 6 in (12.65 m)
- Draft: 23 ft 6 in (7.16 m)
- Speed: 10 knots
- Complement: 63
- Armament: 2 × 6-pounders

USS Brutus, formerly the steamer Peter Jebsen, was a collier in the United States Navy. She was built in 1894 at South Shields-on-Tyne, England, by John Readhead & Sons and was acquired by the U.S. Navy early in 1898 from L. F. Chapman & Company. She was renamed Brutus and commissioned at the Mare Island Navy Yard on 27 May 1898.

== Spanish–American War to 1901 ==
With the Spanish–American War underway, in June 1898 Brutus departed San Diego, California, towing Monterey bound for Manila Bay in the Philippines to reinforce Admiral George Dewey's Asiatic Fleet. Following a voyage of over 3,700 miles during which they made several stops, the two ships entered Manila Bay on 4 August 1898. She remained at Manila until 20 December, at which time she headed back to the United States. After repeating stops at Guam and Hawaii, Brutus arrived in San Francisco, California, on 7 March 1899.

Brutus stayed in the San Francisco area until 10 April when she got underway for the South Pacific. Brutus arrived in Samoa on 29 April and operated among the islands until early July. On the 5th, she set a course for Hawaii. After a 10-day stopover at Honolulu between 16 and 26 July, the collier put to sea bound for the Marianas. She entered Apra Harbor on 13 August and remained there as station ship through the end of the year. During her sojourn at Guam, Brutus was out of commission between 20 October and 24 December. On 6 January 1900, the ship got underway for Japan, via Manila in the Philippines. She arrived at Nagasaki, on 17 January and underwent repairs. On 1 February, she shaped a course back to Guam, arriving in Apra Harbor on the 9th. She resumed duties as station ship at Guam and, on 16 February, was placed out of commission there. The collier underwent a drydock period while at Guam and went back into commission in the fall of 1900.

On 23 September, Brutus departed Apra Harbor. She stopped at Yokohama, Japan, for the first 26 days of October and then headed for Manila. She arrived at her destination on 4 November and began loading coal. The ship completed taking on her cargo and departed the Philippines on the 27th. She reentered Apra Harbor on 6 December. She operated in the Marianas through the first quarter of 1901. On 28 March 1901, Brutus departed Guam bound for the Philippines. She arrived at Cavite on 4 April and began a month of repairs. On 4 May, she put to sea bound for the east coast of the United States. Steaming via Singapore, Ceylon, and Aden, she arrived at Suez, Egypt, on 25 June. The collier transited the Suez Canal on 27 and 28 June. Then, after crossing the Mediterranean Sea and the Atlantic Ocean, Brutus arrived at New York City on 6 August. She was placed out of commission at New York on 29 August 1901.

== Recommissioning ==
She remained inactive at New York until recommissioned on 8 March 1902. On the 25th, she departed New York bound for Baltimore, Maryland, where she arrived two days later. At Baltimore, Brutus loaded cargo, stores, and coal for her own bunkers. On 16 April, the collier put to sea on the long voyage around Cape Horn to Samoa, in the South Pacific. She made stops at San Juan, Puerto Rico, and Montevideo, Uruguay, and arrived in Tutuila on 11 July. She remained there exactly one month, heading back the way she came on 11 August. After repeating her stops at Montevideo and San Juan, she entered Hampton Roads, Virginia, on 27 October. Except for one round-trip voyage to Culebra Island near Puerto Rico between 5 and 19 December, Brutus operated in the Chesapeake Bay area until late January 1903. Between 24 January and 18 April 1903, she cruised in the West Indies and along the coast of Central America returning to Hampton Roads on 18 April.

In the middle of 1903, Brutus was assigned to the Asiatic Fleet. Worked by a merchant crew made up of Chinese nationals, she carried coal to various units of the Navy's squadron in the Orient. Late in 1905, she returned to the east coast of the United States to help perform a monumental task. On 28 December 1905, she steamed out of Chesapeake Bay in company with USS Glacier and USS Caesar towing the USS Dewey drydock to Manila. Steaming across the Atlantic Ocean and Mediterranean Sea, they transited the Suez Canal between 27 April and 1 May 1906. They resumed the voyage early in May and arrived at Olongapo, Luzon, on 10 July. Thereupon, Brutus resumed her former duties as collier to the Asiatic Fleet.

In 1907, the collier returned to the United States and began operations out of Norfolk, Virginia, in support of the Atlantic Fleet. Except for two periods in reserve at the Norfolk Navy Yard, 13 May 1908 to 2 January 1909 and 20 May to 2 July 1912, and a resupply voyage to the Mediterranean Sea in 1915, that employment occupied her time until the spring of 1916. In April 1916, Brutus transferred to the Pacific Fleet and operated from the Mare Island Navy Yard. When the United States entered World War I on 6 April 1917, her merchant crew was taken into the service as members of the United States Naval Reserve Forces. Soon thereafter on 24 April, she ran aground on Cerros Island in a heavy fog. She was refloated 10 days later and was towed to San Diego for temporary repairs. From there, she headed back to the Mare Island Navy Yard where she completed permanent repairs.

She spent the remainder of the war cruising the California and Mexican coast. When the worldwide influenza epidemic struck late in 1918, Brutus loaded supplies and stores and headed for Alaska as part of a Red Cross relief expedition. She returned south from that mission in January 1919. After the war, she was assigned to the Pacific Fleet Train. Early in 1920, the collier voyaged from the west coast to Tutuila, Samoa, carrying coal and supplies to the naval station located there. Later that spring she returned via Hawaii to the west coast and resumed her duties with the Pacific Fleet Train. She remained so employed until decommissioned on 17 August 1921. Her name was struck from the Naval Vessel Register on 29 July 1922, and she was sold to the A. Bercovich Company in Oakland, California.
