= SS Baton Rouge Victory =

World War II Victory ship of the United States

- Typical Victory Ship.

History

United States
- Name: Baton Rouge
- Namesake: City of Baton Rouge
- Owner: War Shipping Administration
- Operator: American Export Line and Isthmian SS Corporation
- Builder: Bethlehem-Fairfield Shipyard, Baltimore
- Laid down: 21 June 1945
- Launched: 22 August 1945
- Completed: 24 September 1945
- Fate: Scrapped at Hualien, Formosa in 1967, after hitting a mine.

General characteristics
- Class & type: VC2-S-AP3 Victory ship
- Tonnage: 7,612 GRT, 4,553 NRT
- Displacement: 15,200 tons
- Length: 455 ft (139 m)
- Beam: 62 ft (19 m)
- Draught: 28 ft (8.5 m)
- Installed power: 8,500 shp (6,300 kW)
- Propulsion: HP & LP turbines geared to a single 20.5-foot (6.2 m) propeller
- Speed: 16.5 knots (30.6 km/h; 19.0 mph)
- Boats & landing craft carried: 4 lifeboats
- Complement: 62 Merchant Marine and 28 US Naval Armed Guards
- Armament: 1 × 5-inch (127 mm)/38 caliber gun; 1 × 3-inch (76 mm)/50 caliber gun; 8 × 20 mm Oerlikon

SS Baton Rouge was a cargo Victory ship built during World War II under the Emergency Shipbuilding program. Baton Rouge (MCV-846) was a type VC2-S-AP2 Victory ship built by Bethlehem-Fairfield Shipyards. The Maritime Administration cargo ship was the 846th ship built. Her keel was laid on June 21, 1945. She was launched on August 22, 1945, and completed on September 24, 1945. The 10,600-ton ship was constructed for the Maritime Commission. The American Export Line and later the Isthmian Steamship Company operated her under the United States Merchant Marine act for the War Shipping Administration.

Victory ships were designed to supersede the earlier Liberty ships. Unlike Liberty ships, Victory ships were designed to serve the US Navy after the war and also last longer. The Victory ship differed from a Liberty ship in that they were: faster, longer and wider, taller, and had a thinner stack set farther toward the superstructure. They also had a long raised forecastle.

== World War II ==
Completed on September 24, 1945, the Baton Rouge did not operate during World War operations, as the surrender of Imperial Japan was announced on August 15, 1945. Baton Rouge transported cargo that was not delivered to the East Coast of the United States and West Coast of the United States due to the shortage of ships during the war. In March 1946 she docked at Newport, Rhode Island with 1,000,000 feet of Douglas fir and western hemlock lumber from Canada. Due to World War II there had been a shortage of lumber from Canada. On 29 November 1946 the SS Baton Rouge Victory collided in thick fog with the freighter SS Sea Centaur at the harbor near the San Pedro Breakwater, near the entrance to Los Angeles Harbor at night. Visibility was 150 feet that night. The Sea Centaur, owned by the Matson Navigation Company, was inbound from San Francisco. The Sea Centaur had damage to her bow above the water line from the ramming of the Isthmian Steamship Company's Baton Rouge Victory. Baton Rouge Victory had just steamed in from the Golden Gate. The Baton Rouge Victory captain, J. A. Keerson, reported on the damage to the deck and flying bridge. After World War II, in 1947, she was laid up James River in the National Defense Reserve Fleet.

== Korean War ==
In 1950 she was reactivated for the Korean War. She made eight trips to Korea between 6 March 1951 and 28 March 1952. She helped American forces engaged against Communist aggression in South Korea. About 75% of the personnel taken to Korea for the Korean War came by merchant marine ships. SS Baton Rouge transported goods, mail, food and other supplies. About 90% of the cargo was moved by merchant marine ships to the war zone. After the Korean War she was laid up in 1952 at Suisun Bay reserve fleet.

== Vietnam War ==
In 1966 it was reactivated for the Vietnam War and operated by the SS United States.

The ship had departed the San Francisco Embarcadero on 28 July 1966 with a crew of 45, loaded with military trucks and tractors, automobiles, mail, and general cargo.

On August 26, Baton Rouge Victory was attacked by two 2,400-pound limpet mines while proceeding along the Lòng Tàu River, about 22 miles (35 km) southeast of Saigon. The explosions killed seven American civilian sailors on board and tore a 16-by-45-foot (4.9 by 13.7 m) hole in the ship's hull, forcing the captain to run the ship aground to avoid sinking and blocking the shipping channel. The number 3 cargo hold flooded quickly. The ship was refloated on 30 August 1966 with the assistance of Harbor Clearance Unit One and towed to Vũng Tàu.

In 1967 the ship was scrapped at Hualien, Formosa, now called Taiwan.

== Memorial and honors ==
The seven American civilian merchant Seamen killed in Vietnam are remembered on the Vietnam Service, American Merchant Seamen Memorial in San Francisco. The attack on the SS Baton Rouge Victory was largest single loss of life due to enemy action for merchant mariners in the Vietnam War.

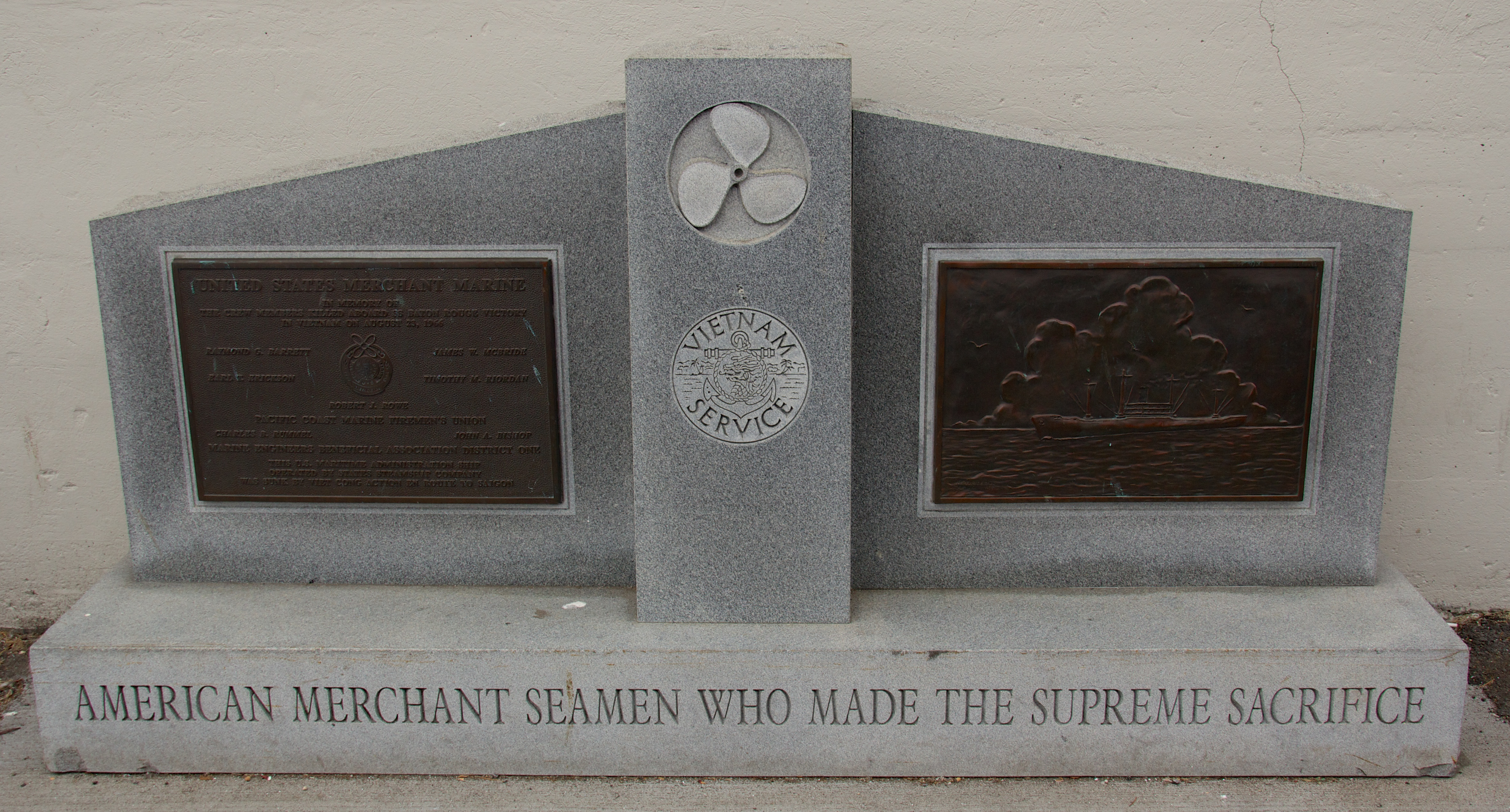
Vietnam Service. American Merchant Seamen who made the supreme sacrifice. San Francisco, includes men from the SS Baton Rouge Victory

== See also ==
- Attack on the SS Baton Rouge Victory
- Attack on the USNS Card
- List of Victory ships
- Liberty ship
- Type C1 ship
- Type C2 ship
- Type C3 ship

== Sources ==
- Sawyer, L.A. and W.H. Mitchell. Victory ships and tankers: The history of the ‘Victory’ type cargo ships and the tankers built in the United States of America during World War II, Cornell Maritime Press, 1974, 0-87033-182-5.
- United States Maritime Commission:
- Victory Cargo Ships
