= Harbor Clearance Unit One =

United States Navy unit

Harbor Clearance Unit One, a United States Navy unit, was commissioned in February 1966 with the mission "....to provide salvage repair; diving and rescue services in rivers and restricted waters and to conduct harbor and river clearance operations in the Western Pacific." Some contended that the intended mission was to provide rapidly deployable diving and salvage teams in direct support of the Vietnam War. Whatever the actual intent was, the concept was proven so effective that the command was moved to continuous salvage service at Pearl Harbor, Hawaii, near the end of the Vietnam War.

== Scope ==
The unit's role encompassed the entire spectrum of marine salvage. From South Korea to Guam, to Japan and the Philippines, HCU-1 detachments aided military forces of the US, South Vietnam, South Korea, Australia and New Zealand. They covered every corner of South Vietnam: from the harbors of Saigon to the rivers of the lower Mekong Delta; from the coastline to the upper highlands near the Cambodian and Laotian borders, from the DMZ to Sea Float in the southernmost tip of the country. They rescued from the murky waters of the Mekong and its tributaries practically every type of vessel utilized in Vietnam. Salvage also meant the recovery of, the repair of, and/or the demolition of aircraft and bridges; trucks, tanks, and tractors; forklifts and ferry landings; sampans and steamers.

== History ==
The original harbor clearance units were formed during World War II and were active clearing the obstructed harbors of Bizerte, Tunisia; Naples, Italy; Cherbourg, France; and Manila and Subic Bay, Philippines.

Harbor Clearance Unit One, or HCU-One, was established at Subic Bay on 1 February 1966 with a hand-picked cadre of five officers and sixty-five enlisted men. The unit was under the operational and administrative control of Commander Service Group Three; Vietnam detachments were under the operational control of Commander, Naval Forces Vietnam.

Twenty-four days after unit commissioning, salvage of the merchant vessel Sea Raven near Chu Lai, South Vietnam, was underway. It was a successful operation. Six months and numerous smaller operations later, the Victory ship Baton Rouge Victory was salvaged on the Long Tau River, South Vietnam. The Baton Rouge Victory was the first American vessel sunk in the Saigon ship channel." A large-scale operation ensued: the tender, the Subic staff, an all support personnel were called to the job site. The entire command, except for one Light Lift Craft, participated. Baton Rouge Victory and its $500,000+ cargo was salvaged. The world's largest salvage patch to date, costing over $50,000, was designed/applied by the HCU-l personnel. The patch was manufactured by the Ship Repair Facility, Subic Bay Naval Shipyard, Philippines.

The second major salvage operation in January/February 1967, was one of the world's largest dredges, the 170 feet (52 m) Jamaica Bay, at Đồng Tâm Base Camp. This job was the first of three dredge jobs, all similar in size and configuration, all sunk in Dong Tam and all less than a kilometer apart.

Most salvage jobs consisted of segmented operations requiring the independent operation of teams and craft deployed in-country. Major jobs were less frequent and required the mobilization of many craft, personnel, and materials. Large or small, salvage and clearance operations were the unit business: vital to the Vietnam effort.

Since its inception, HCU-1 conducted these salvage and clearance operations:

- Eleven large stranded ships refloated
- Four large sunken ships refloated
- Six large sunken ships obstructing channels demolished or removed
- Twenty-nine barges refloated
- Four barges demolished to clear channels
- Six tug boats refloated
- Three tug boats demolished to clear channels
- Wreckage of twenty-two aircraft salvaged
- Fifty-one Swift, PBR, and Riverine boats salvaged or saved from sinking
- Twelve demolished bridges cleared from rivers
- Five sunken dredges salvaged
- Two sunken dredges, obstructing channels, demolished
- Two tanks, four amphibious tractors and eight Army trucks salvaged
- Eight sunken mooring buoys raised and repaired
- Five concrete pontoon ferry landings refloated
- Two mobile support bases utilizing ammi pontoons moored in position
- Two refuse trucks salved
- Two forklifts salved
- Six major fires fought and extinguished

HCU-1 trained numerous Vietnamese divers and turned over many US Navy salvage assets to Vietnam during the Vietnamization program. The unit was relocated to Bishop Point moorage at Pearl Harbor, Hawaii (on Hickam Air Force Base) on 1 JUL 71. YRST-1 later followed the Headquarters Unit; it was towed by USS Chowanoc from Subic Bay on 7 July 1971, bound for Pearl Harbor. YRST-1 moored at Alpha Docks on 30 July 1971 and was then moved to Pearl Harbor Naval Shipyard for modification on 6 October 1971. Modifications included the installation of a Taylor Diving System to support the Navy/Makai Range CY 71 Dive Project.

Harbor Clearance Unit One (HCU-1) was renamed Mobile Diving and Salvage Unit One (MDSU-1) in January, 1982. Manpower level was greatly reduced and the command was transferred as a unit under the control of Service Squadron Five at Pearl Harbor, Hawaii. The unit also gained six reserve detachments consisting of over 250 personnel. MDSU-1 dive teams were back in-country twenty-plus years later, farther north than any wartime operations and for a decidedly different purpose. Vietnam allowed the US Government to research and recover remains of US service members killed in action at coastal aircraft wreck sites. In October 1995, a scuba survey team deployed to Vietnam to gather evidence. Their efforts resulted in the positive identification of one site and the elimination of several others. MDSU-1 conducted recovery operations at several sites off Nang An province in March and April, 1996.

For its service during the Vietnam War the unit received the Presidential Unit Citation, Navy Unit Commendation and the Navy Meritorious Unit Commendation.

== Manpower ==
Beginning as a small cadre of personnel, HCU 1 quickly grew in size to over 260 personnel, as combat operations in littoral environment intensified. At its peak, the unit consisted of five Harbor Clearance teams of 20 to 22 personnel each and a varied armada of specialized vessels within the Vietnam combat zone.

Each salvage team was designed to supply experienced and qualified marine salvors anywhere they were needed: divers and non-diving technicians, artisans, and support personnel. Approximately 18 in number, teams were led by an Officer in Charge and an assistant, both diving Officers. Teams often worked in groups of three to five men on small jobs. They carried what gear they could to the job, utilizing a wide variety of transportation facilities: helicopters, cargo aircraft, small boats, ships, trucks, jeeps, and on foot. Upon arrival, they made a detailed survey to develop the salvage plan: methods to be used plus required materials and equipment. Work commenced with a minimum of three divers and whatever indigenous labor and/or materiel was available. Whenever major salvage operations were required, the teams supplied all manpower.

Teams were very mobile and task-oriented. Part of a team might work deep within the Delta clearing the jungle rivers of obstructions with explosives, while others might work aboard a YLLC to reclaim a sunken PBR. Faced with responsibilities only specialized, independent duty could provide, each team member was relied upon for his contribution. Within each salvage team, it was not a matter of Navy rate, it was a matter of personal skill.

The teams gained extensive experience in marine salvage, deck seamanship, heavy rigging, operation and maintenance of salvage gear and equipment, and riverine warfare. All ratings were required --- from Seaman Apprentice to Chief Petty Officer, for qualified divers and non-divers.

== Hardware ==
=== Repair Salvage Tender (YRST) ===
The main unit support and headquarters barge: a towed Repair Salvage Tender --- which housed the Officer in Charge, Assistant Officer in Charge and crew of 34, including divers. Equipped with repair shops and a working platform for the fabrication of salvage patches, it also provided electrical power to wrecks. It contained the Headquarters Group, including a Naval Engineering Duty Officer (Naval Architect and Salvage Engineer), diving Medical Officer, Supply Officer, and Admin Officer, plus appropriate personnel. According to the Naval Vessel Register (NVR), the former YRST-1 (redesignated "YR 94 FLOATING WORKSHOP") still remains in service:

=== Heavy Lift Craft (YHLC/AHLC) ===
Commissioned in 1943 by Nazi Germany and contracted 14 years later by the United Nations to clear the Suez Canal of sunken vessels, ENERGIE and AUSDAUER added 4,800 tons of combined lift strength to HCU-1. YHLC-l CRILLEY (formerly ENERGIE) and YHLC-2 CRANDALL (formerly AUSDAUER) were the two largest salvage craft in the world at that time. Manned by an Officer in Charge and twenty-five men, they provided command headquarters, berthing and messing facilities for embarked personnel. The first use of the YHLCs on salvage operations was near Dong Tam, RVN, on the sunken dredger SANDPUMPER, which sank after it dredged aboard a piece of unexploded ordnance that later exploded.

=== Medium Lift Craft (YMLC) ===
Four YMLC's with tidal/ballast lift capability of 750 tons each, on lease from Great Britain, were indispensable in effecting major salvage tasks. Manned by Harbor Clearance Teams, they provided headquarters and berthing facilities for the deployed teams and craft at Vung Tau Harbor.

=== Light Lift Craft (YLLC) ===
Capable of lifting 25 tons with an A-frame derrick mounted forward and capable of a 100-ton ballast bow lift: an exceptional salvage platform with air compressors for diving operations and salvage tools. A Clyde salvage winch and a capstan, each with 7.5-ton pulling capacity, provided the muscle needed for the A-frame, the three complete sets of beach gear carried on board (60-ton pull on each leg), and the flexible power needed on independent operations. Two jetting pumps provided dewatering, underwater digging, and auxiliary fire fighting capabilities. Cutting/welding and messing/berthing facilities were also aboard. Two AC generators also provided electrical power to the salvage site and shore power to distressed ships/bases as required. Manned by an Officer in Charge and 16 enlisted men, they often operated independently and were a vital asset to a major salvage job.

=== Combat Salvage Boats (CSB) ===
Four converted Landing Craft Mechanized (LCM 6) were designed/equipped for riverine salvage work in support of the Mobile Riverine Force. A much smaller version of the YLLC, each CSB was manned by a handpicked, all enlisted crew of six to eight men, four of whom were divers. Able to perform salvage operations in lesser rivers and channels than the YLLC, the CSB was capable of entirely independent salvage operations—a mainstay of salvage support for Mobile Riverine Groups.

=== Diving Boats (YDB) ===
Two Yard Diving Boats, 64-foot highly-maneuverable craft, were a vital part of every salvage operation. Mainly used as a diving platform, they were able to go where others could not. It was manned by a crew of from four to six enlisted men (not necessarily divers) YDBs rotated between Subic Bay and Vietnam.

=== Advanced Diving System IV (ADS IV) ===
Used for both deep water search and salvage to 600 feet, it could be airlifted anywhere in the world and was maintained in Subic Bay by Harbor Clearance Team TWO.
