= USS Potomac (AT-50) =

Tugboat of the United States Navy

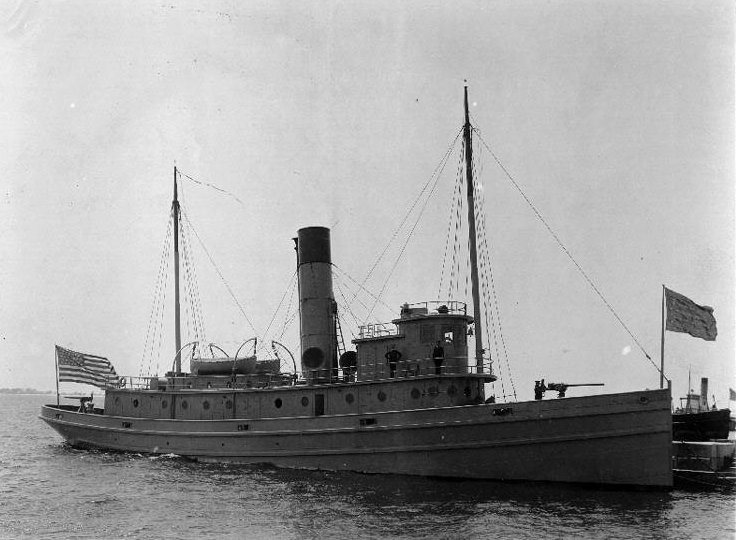

History

United States
- Name: USS Potomac
- Launched: 1897, as Wilmot
- Acquired: by purchase, 14 April 1898
- Decommissioned: 26 June 1922
- Reclassified: AT-50, July 1920
- Stricken: 31 July 1922
- Fate: Sold, 1 December 1922; Scrapped 1981

General characteristics
- Type: Tugboat
- Displacement: 785 long tons (798 t)
- Length: 138 ft 9 in (42.29 m)
- Beam: 28 ft 6 in (8.69 m)
- Draft: 12 ft (3.7 m)
- Speed: 16 kn (18 mph; 30 km/h)
- Complement: 56
- Armament: 2 × 3-pounder guns

USS Potomac (AT-50), a tug built in 1897 as Wilmot by the F. W. Wheeler Company, West Bay City, Michigan, was purchased by the United States Navy from the Ocean Towing and Wrecking Company on 14 April 1898 for service in the Spanish–American War, commanded by Lieutenant G. P. Blow.

== Atlantic Ocean operations ==
From December 1905 to mid-1906, Potomac served as part of the squadron that towed the floating dry dock USS Dewey from Maryland to the Philippines.

During the war, she served in the West Indies, and was retained by the U.S. Navy after peace was restored. In the ensuing years, Potomac operated out of U.S. East Coast ports.

She left Newport, Rhode Island on 28 January 1914 to rescue vessels icebound off Newfoundland. Potomac was herself iced-in and abandoned on 14 February, but salvaged in the late spring, arriving New York Navy Yard on 9 June.

After overhaul and repair, she became a tender in the Atlantic Fleet during 1915, and tender to the Panama Canal Zone submarine squadron in 1916.

Late in 1916, she was transferred to the West Indies, and while based at Santo Domingo, served as a transport and tug. After training exercises with the Atlantic Fleet off the Virginia Capes and a brief overhaul, Potomac returned to the Caribbean. Based in Haiti, she served as a transport for Marines, as well as carrying mail and stores. The tug was again home-ported at Santo Domingo in early 1920, and in July of that year was designated AT-50.

== Decommissioning ==
She remained in service in the Caribbean until May 1922, when she returned to Norfolk, Virginia. Decommissioned on 26 June, she was struck from the Naval Vessel Register on 31 July and sold to New Orleans & Bisso Towboat Company on 1 December for $40,000. Renamed the SS Robert L. Wilmot, she served as a commercial tug until her scrapping in 1981.

== Bibliography ==
- Eger, Christopher L. (March 2021). "Hudson Fulton Celebration, Part II". Warship International. LVIII (1): 58–81. ISSN 0043-0374.
