= Taussig =

Taussig or Tausig is a surname. Notable people with the surname include:

- Charles William Taussig (1896–1948), American writer and manufacturer
- Don Taussig (born 1932), American Major League Baseball player
- Eduardo Maria Taussig, Catholic bishop
- Edward D. Taussig (1847–1921), American rear admiral
- Frank William Taussig (1859–1940), American economist
- Franziska Tausig (1895–1989), Austrian author
- Frederick J. Taussig (1872–1943), American gynaecologist and obstetrician
- Hal Taussig, American academic
- Harry Taussig (born 1941), American physicist and artist
- Helen B. Taussig (1898–1986), American cardiologist; daughter of Frank Taussig
- Helene von Taussig (1879–1942), Austrian artist
- Herta Freitag (née Taussig; 1908 – 2000), Austrian-American mathematician
- Imre Taussig (1894–1945), Hungarian footballer
- Isaac W. Taussig (1850–1917), mayor of Jersey City, New Jersey
- Josef Taussig (1914-1945), Czech journalist
- Joseph Taussig (1877–1947), American vice admiral; son of Edward Taussig
- Joseph K. Taussig Jr. (1920–1999), American captain; son of Joseph Taussig
- Karl Tausig (1841–1871), Polish musician
- Lev Taussig (1880 – ?), Czech chess player
- Michael Taussig (born 1940), American anthropologist
- Nick Taussig (born 1973), British author and film producer
- Otto Tausig (1922–2011), Austrian writer, director and actor
- Peter Elyakim Taussig (born 1944), Israeli pianist
- Walter Taussig (1908–2003), American conductor
- William Taussig (1826–1913), St. Louis physician and businessperson, father of F. W. Taussig

== See also ==
- Blalock-Taussig shunt
- Taussig-Bing syndrome
- USS Felix Taussig
- USS Joseph K. Taussig (DE-1030)
- USS Taussig (DD-746), an American Allen M. Sumner-class destroyer
