= John Garrison Dunbar =

Civil War officer and civic leader

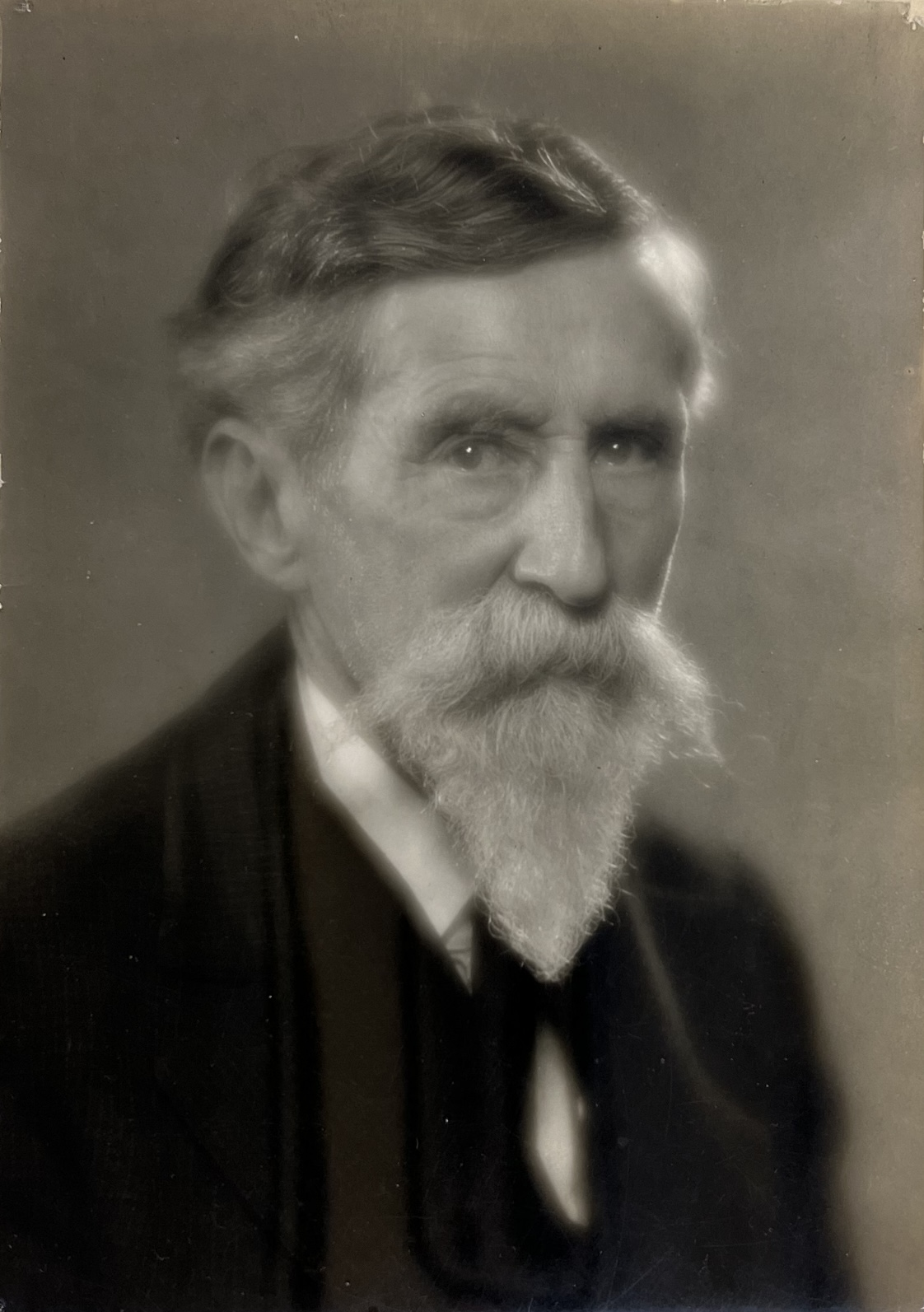
- John G. Dunbar c. 1920s
- Born: May 8, 1839; Greenfield, Indiana, U.S.
- Died: December 6, 1929 (aged 90); Greencastle, Indiana, U.S.
- Burial place: Forest Hill Cemetery, Shelbyville, Indiana
- Military career
- Allegiance: United States
- Branch: Union Army
- Service years: 1861–1865
- Rank: Major
- Unit: 79th Indiana Infantry Regiment
- Commands: Acting Chief of Staff, 3rd Division, IV Corps
- Conflicts: Battle of Stones River; Battle of Chickamauga; Battle of Missionary Ridge; Sherman's March to the Sea
- Other work: Physician, farmer, postmaster, civic leader

John Garrison Dunbar (May 8, 1839 – December 6, 1929) was an American Civil War officer, physician, and postmaster from Indiana. He served in the Union Army with the 79th Indiana Infantry Regiment, rising to the rank of major and acting as chief of staff to General Thomas J. Wood. After the war he practiced medicine, farmed near Greencastle, Indiana, and was later appointed postmaster. In 1890 he ran for Congress in Indiana's 5th district as the Union Labor Party's nominee, with the endorsement of the Republican convention, but was defeated by Democrat George W. Cooper. Late in life he was recognized as DePauw University's oldest living graduate and awarded the Alumni Memorial Cane in 1923.

== Early life and education ==
Dunbar was born in Greenfield, Indiana, on May 8, 1839. He attended Asbury College and graduated in 1861 with an A.B. degree. He later received an A.M. in 1864 and an M.D. in 1866.

== Civil War service ==
Dunbar enlisted in the Union Army in 1862 with the 79th Indiana Infantry Regiment. He was elected second lieutenant by his company and later promoted through the ranks to captain and major. During the war, he served as Acting Chief of Staff to General Thomas J. Wood of the IV Corps in 1864.

The 79th Indiana participated in multiple major battles, including Battle of Stones River (1862–63), the Battle of Chickamauga (1863), and the Battle of Missionary Ridge (1863). They later took part in Sherman's March to the Sea in 1864. According to a fellow soldier, "from Stone River's bloody battlefield to Chickamauga, Mission Ridge, and Sherman's famous 'march through Georgia,' Major Dunbar was always at the head of the regiment and seemed to enjoy being in the thickest of the fight."

== Post-war career ==
=== Medicine and farming ===
After the war, Dunbar received an A.M.in 1864 and an M.D. in 1866. He practiced medicine for three years in Greenfield, Indiana. In 1871, he moved to Greencastle Township, Putnam County, where he farmed.

=== Government service ===
In 1866, Dunbar was appointed assistant assessor of internal revenue and served in that office until 1871.

=== Residence ===
Dunbar resided at 505 East Seminary Street in Greencastle, a Queen Anne-style house built around 1890. The property is a contributing structure in the Eastern Enlargement Historic District, which was listed on the National Register of Historic Places in 2011.

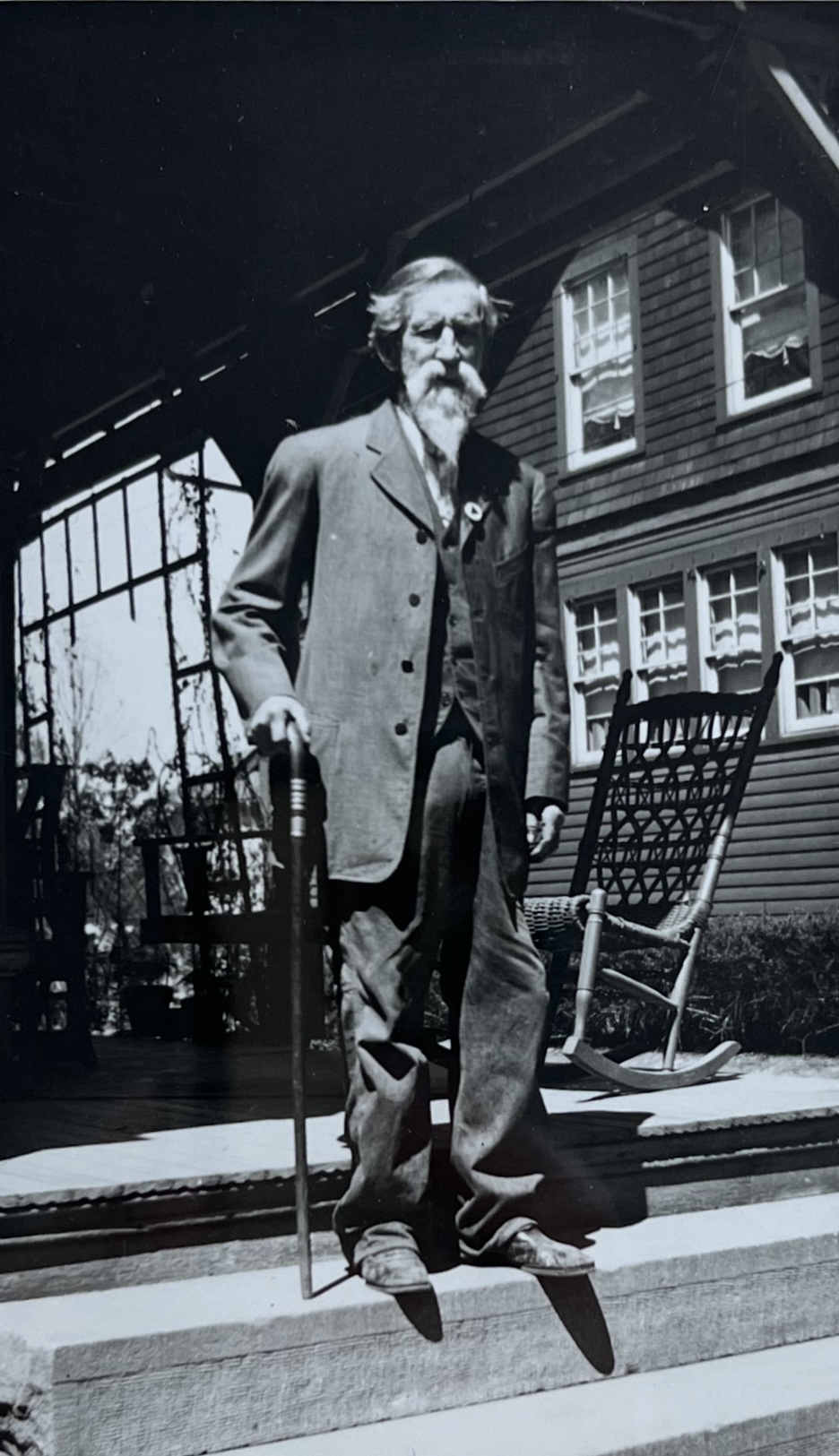
John G. Dunbar at his residence, Greencastle (c. 1920s)

=== Postmaster ===
In 1902, Dunbar was appointed postmaster of Greencastle, with his son Park serving as assistant postmaster.

== Political activity ==
Dunbar was active in Republican politics in the early 1880s. In 1882 he was elected chairman of the county central committee, and that same year was mentioned in the press as a possible congressional candidate. He seconded the nomination of George W. Grubbs for Congress in 1884 at the Republican district convention, and in 1886 appeared on stage with Senator Benjamin Harrison at a major Republican rally in Indianapolis.

In 1890, Dunbar was nominated for Congress in Indiana's 5th district by the Union Labor Party. He received the endorsement of the Republican convention as well, which described him as a "practical farmer" and "gallant soldier." His candidacy was supported by veterans, including T. L. Glass, and by prohibitionist reformers such as Dr. Parkhurst. During the campaign he was attacked by political opponents in Nashville, Indiana, where hecklers threw eggs and stones after one of his speeches.

Dunbar was defeated in the election by Democratic incumbent George W. Cooper, losing by about 1,200 votes. In the weeks after the election, county auditor Randel accused him of misconduct as township trustee.

== Community and veterans' events ==
In December 1880, Dunbar was elected secretary of the local council of the Royal Arcanum, a fraternal benefit society founded in 1877.

He remained active in veterans' organizations throughout his life. In October 1881 he attended the first camp-fire of the Grand Army of the Republic (GAR) in Greencastle. At DePauw University's commencement exercises in 1885, he took part in a sham battle. In 1887 he delivered the address of welcome at Wilder's Brigade Reunion.

In 1889 he participated in cornerstone ceremonies for the Soldiers' and Sailors' Monument in Indianapolis. He later attended GAR gatherings, including the Grand Encampment in 1921 and the Chickamauga reunion of 1928.

== Personal life ==
Dunbar married Julia Hammond on December 1, 1863. They had two sons, Walter and Park. Julia died in 1878.

On September 12, 1889, he married Alice Talbott of Greencastle.

In January 1873, he survived a hunting accident near Greencastle.

His mother, Mary R. Dunbar, died in 1894.

== Personal correspondence ==
Several letters written by Dunbar during the Civil War are preserved in the DePauw University Archives.

In June 1862, while stationed in Jacksonville, Alabama, he described the conditions of marching and reflected on the life of a soldier. In January 1863, from Missouri, he noted the uncertainty of campaigning and the frequent rumors of battle. Later that year, from Escambia, Alabama, he wrote to his wife requesting ordinary household utensils from home, illustrating the practical needs and personal connections maintained even during wartime.

== Later honors and death ==
In 1923, Dunbar was awarded DePauw University's Alumni Memorial Cane as its oldest living graduate. He was honored again at alumni events in 1924.

He continued to attend GAR reunions into old age, including serving as principal speaker at the 1928 Chickamauga reunion.

Dunbar died at his home in Greencastle on December 6, 1929. His widow, Alice Talbott Dunbar, died in 1930.
