= ROCS Lo Yang =

ROCS Lo Yang (DD-14) may refer to one of the following destroyers of the Republic of China Navy:

- ROCS Lo Yang (DD-14) (Benson class), the former American Benson-class destroyer USS Benson (DD-421) launched in November 1939; acquired by the Republic of China Navy in February 1954; struck in 1975 and scrapped
- ROCS Lo Yang (DD-14) (Allen M. Sumner class), the former American Allen M. Sumner-class destroyer USS Taussig (DD-746) launched in January 1944; acquired by the Republic of China Navy in May 1974; later reclassified as DD-949; decommissioned in 2000 and scrapped in 2013
