= Edward D. Taussig =

Rear admiral in the United States Navy (1847–1921)

Edward David Taussig
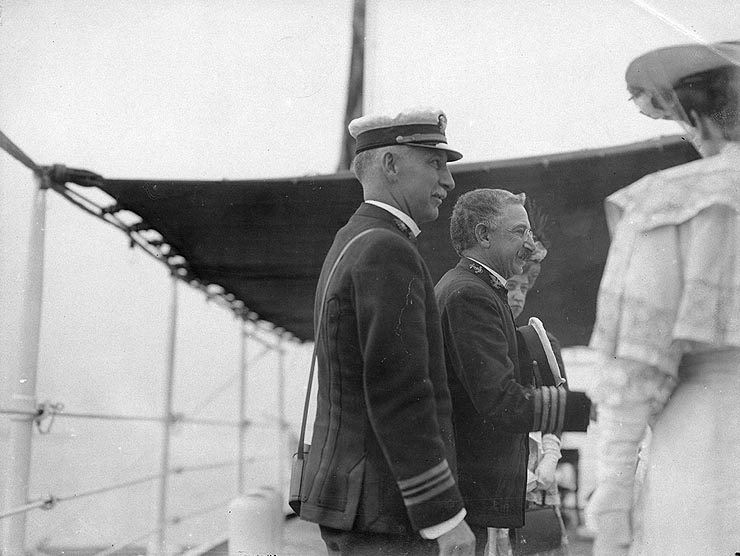
- Captain Taussig (probably onboard Massachusetts)
- Born: November 20, 1847; St. Louis, Missouri
- Died: January 29, 1921 (aged 73); Newport, Rhode Island
- Burial place: United States Naval Academy Cemetery
- Relatives: Vice Admiral Joseph K. Taussig (son); Captain Joseph K. Taussig Jr. (grandson)
- Military career
- Allegiance: United States of America
- Branch: United States Navy
- Service years: 1863–1909, 1918
- Rank: Rear admiral
- Commands: Bennington; Yorktown; Enterprise; Independence; Massachusetts; Indiana; Fifth Naval District
- Conflicts: Civil War; Spanish–American War; Philippine–American War; China Relief Expedition; World War I

Edward David Taussig (November 20, 1847 – January 29, 1921) was a decorated rear admiral in the United States Navy. He is best remembered for being the officer to claim Wake Island after the Spanish–American War, as well as accepting the physical relinquishment of Guam by its Spanish governor following the Treaty of Paris in which Spain ceded Guam to the United States following nearly 300 years of colonial rule. Taussig briefly served as Governor of Guam. He was the first of a four-generational family of United States Naval Academy graduates including his son, Vice Admiral Joseph K. Taussig (1877–1947), grandson Captain Joseph K. Taussig Jr. (1920–1999), and great-grandson, Captain Joseph K. Taussig III USMC (1945–).

== Early sea service ==
Taussig was born in St. Louis, Missouri, the son of a wool broker, Charles and his wife, Anna (Abeles), who had emigrated from Austria in 1840. His family was Jewish. He was appointed to the U.S. Naval Academy during the Civil War and entered on July 23, 1863. His education over the next four years included service on the Macedonian. Graduating in June 1867 he served on the steam frigate Minnesota from July to December 1867 and thereafter variously on the Wateree, Powhatan, Onward and Resaca from January 1868 to April 1870. He was commissioned an ensign on December 18, 1868. His early sea service was perhaps most remarkable for his time as a passed midshipman on the gunboat Wateree when a tsunami washed her far inland at Arica (then part of Peru), on August 13, 1868. He was decorated for his actions during this event.

== 1870s–1890s service ==
Promoted to master on March 21, 1870, and to lieutenant on January 1, 1872, during the 1870s and 1880s, Taussig was stationed at a number of shore stations and ships: Narragansett, Pacific Squadron (October 1870 – September 1873); Newport Torpedo Station, (June–October 1874); Hydrographic Office, Washington, D.C. (October – December 1874); Panama Survey Expedition (January- April 1875); special duty, Bureau of Navigation, Washington, D.C. (May–October 1875); commander, receiving ship Relief, Washington, D.C. (September 1875); Temporary duty assignment Washington Navy Yard (October 1875 – April 1876); Juniata, Baltimore and Norfolk Navy Yard (April – September 1876); training ship Monongahela (September 1876 – February 1877); Trenton, flagship of the European Squadron, and Constellation, special service European Station (February 1877 – January 1880); U.S. Naval Academy (June 1880 – April 1883); United States Coast and Geodetic Survey duty, commanding the survey steamers McArthur and Hassler (May 1883 – August 1886); training ship Jamestown (September 1886 – December 1887); and Bureau of Navigation, Washington, D.C. (December 1887 – December 1890).

During special duty, Navy Department, Washington, D.C. (December 1890 – April 1894) Taussig was involved in managing the navy's exhibit at the Columbian Exposition, including the full-size mock-up battleship Illinois, where he was executive officer, following his promotion to lieutenant commander on June 19, 1892. Thereafter, his assignments were executive officer, Atlanta, North Atlantic Squadron (April 1894 – September 1895); executive officer, receiving ship Richmond, Philadelphia Navy Yard (October 1895 – February 1896); executive officer, Monadnock, Pacific Squadron (February – September 1896); Hydrographic Office, Washington, D.C. (September – December 1896); hydrographic inspector, United States Coast and Geodetic Survey, Washington, D.C. (December 1896 – August 1897); coast survey steamer Blake (August 1897 – May 1898); and Norfolk Navy Yard (June – July 1898).

== Wake Island, Guam and the Philippine–American War ==
Promoted to the rank of commander on August 10, 1898, his first command was the gunboat USS Bennington (PG-4), which departed San Francisco on September 18 bound for Hawaii, Guam and duty with the Asiatic Squadron, in the aftermath of August 12, 1898 Spanish–American War armistice. Bennington arrived in Hawaii on September 27, 1898, and spent the next three months operating in local waters and conducting surveys, including Pearl Harbor. In December of that year, Taussig was given orders to proceed to Wake Island and claim it for the United States. After ten days passage from Honolulu, he arrived to formally claim the island on January 17, 1899. At one p.m. a flagstaff was placed, and with sailors in dress whites forming two ranks, Taussig called all to witness that the island was not in the possession of any other nation and declared it in possession of the United States. Taussig ordered the American flag raised by Ensign Wettengell and Bennington gave a 21-gun salute when the flag reached the truck. At the time President William McKinley ordering that Wake Island be claimed as a U.S. possession was seen as questionable; however, no other nation had claimed the island and there was no native population. Wake Island was primarily taken for its strategic value as a cable station, midway between Hawaii and the Philippines.

Departing from Wake Island at 5:35 p.m. on January 17, 1899, Bennington arrived at Guam on January 23, 1899. The island previously had been captured on June 21, 1898, by Captain Henry Glass of the Charleston who had left Francisco Portusach Martínez, an American civilian, in charge of the territory. Captain Glass is reported to have told Martínez, the only American on Guam, to "take care of the island until some other officers or man-of-war might reach Guam." Although this has never been confirmed by the U.S. Navy, it was widely believed to be true. Martínez had been deposed in favor of non-American leadership under José Sisto, the highest ranking Spanish civil official in the island, and then Venancio Roberto, each laying competing claims to governance. Venancio Roberto's claim was rebuked in favor of Sisto by Lieutenant Commander Vincendon L. Cottman, commander of the U.S. Navy collier Brutus that had arrived at Guam on New Year's Day 1899 en route back to the U.S. from the Spanish–American War. However Sisto's authority was short-lived.

On February 1, Sisto officially relinquished control of the governmental and administrative affairs of Guam to Taussig and Cottman. The American flag was raised over the Governor's Palace in a ceremony that ended with a 21-gun salute from the Bennington, formally ending nearly 300 years of Guam being part of the Spanish colonial empire. In his short time on Guam, Commander Taussig set up a local council system of temporary government which lasted until the arrival of Lieutenant Louis A. Kaiser in July 1899 under orders to conduct navy surveillance of affairs of Guam. Taussig also supervised the establishment of signal stations and a port survey. On April 15, 1899, Admiral George Dewey cabled the Navy Department in Washington, "Wheeling arrived six days from Guam. Quiet and order there. Most friendly to Americans. Native Government established by Taussig working well. Native soldiers fine body of men. Nanshan (United States Naval Transport) in Guam."

Departing Guam in mid-February 1899, Commander Taussig and Bennington continued on to Manila, where the ship arrived on February 22, 1899, with the mission of supporting the Army's campaigns during the Philippine–American War primarily with patrol and escort duty. In August 1899, Taussig was summarily relieved of command of the Bennington and ordered home by Rear Admiral John C. Watson, commander of the Asiatic Station, following Taussig's dissent from the latter's views concerning campaign plans that were voiced at a staff conference in Manila. According to press reports, Watson resented Taussig's verbal opposition, and a heated argument between the two ensued. Following his return to San Francisco on the hospital ship, Solace, Commander Taussig requested an investigation.

He was assigned to duty with the United States Lighthouse Board as 13th District Inspector in Portland, Oregon, from October 1899 to April 1900. However, Commander Taussig did not have to wait long for vindication, when in March 1900, public accounts surfaced of Watson's friction with officers under his command and with the Bureau of Navigation over Watson's choice of Commander C. C. Cornwall as his executive officer, which the bureau disapproved. Due to health reasons, Watson was himself privately relieved of command months before the public announcement in March 1900 that he was to be relieved by Rear Admiral George C. Remey. Watson returned home on his flagship Baltimore in April 1900, the same month that Commander Taussig's duty as lighthouse inspector ended.

== The China Relief Expedition (Boxer Rebellion) ==
In the spring of 1900, Chinese xenophobia, including disdain for the presence of Christian missionaries, fueled by decades of Western economic exploitation, culminated in the Boxer Rebellion. The Society of Righteous and Harmonious Fists, whose members were referred to in the West as "Boxers", besieged the foreign legations at Peking and at Tientsin. An international relief force was hastily assembled and sent to relieve the siege. As part of the United States Navy's force assigned to the campaign, the gunboat Yorktown, sister-ship of the Bennington, was withdrawn from her patrol duties in the northern Philippines to provide assistance to operations off the North China coast. Yorktown departed Manila on April 3, 1900, upon reaching the mainland, her landing force served ashore at Taku Forts. In June, Taussig assumed command of Yorktown and assisted Oregon to back off a reef near Taku. In August, with Yorktown stationed off Chefoo, China, Taussig cabled dispatches of the decisive Battle of Beicang from which the Chinese military never recovered. The gunboat departed Shanghai on September 10, reaching Cavite on the 17th. In the Philippines, Yorktown resumed her prior cooperation with Army forces, engaged in pacification efforts for the next two years. Commander Taussig was detached from Yorktown in June 1901 and was ordered home to await orders (June – October 1901).

== Later years ==
Thereafter, Taussig's assignments were to the Washington Navy Yard (November 1901 – January 1902); ordnance office, Boston Navy Yard (January – May 1902); and commander, training ship, Enterprise (May–October 1902). Promoted to captain on November 7, 1902, he served as yard captain, Pensacola Navy Yard (January – October 1903); commander, receiving ship Independence, Mare Island, California (October 1903 – October 1904); and commander, USS Massachusetts (BB-2), North Atlantic Squadron (November 1904 – January 1906).

On July 24, 1905, along with Rear admirals Charles D. Sigsbee, James H. Sands, Charles H. Davis Jr., Captains Benjamin F. Tilley, William H. Reeder, and Gervais of the French naval cruiser, Jurien de la Graviere, Taussig had the honor of being an honorary pall bearer when Admiral John Paul Jones body was returned from France on the Brooklyn to be interred at the U.S. Naval Academy.

Following his command of Massachusetts, he was commander, of the training ship Indiana (January – December 1906); yard captain, New York Navy Yard (March – May 1907); general court martial duty, League Island Navy Yard (Pennsylvania) (May – December 1907); commandant, Norfolk Navy Yard and Fifth Naval District (December 1907 – November 1909).

While at Norfolk he was promoted to rear admiral on May 15, 1908. Rear Admiral Taussig was placed on the U.S. Navy retired list on November 20, 1909.

In 1909 he became a companion of the District of Columbia Commandery of the Military Order of the Loyal Legion of the United States—a military society consisting of officers who had served in the Union armed forces during the American Civil War.

== World War I ==
During World War I, Taussig was recalled to active duty as commandant of the Naval Unit at Columbia University (September – December 1918).

== Dates of rank ==
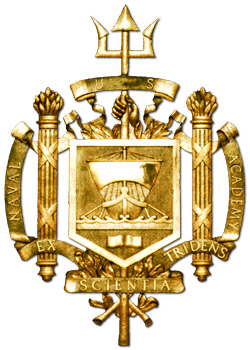
United States Naval Academy Midshipman – Class of 1867

Ensign	Master	Lieutenant	Lieutenant Commander	Commander	Captain
O-1	O-2	O-3	O-4	O-5	O-6
December 18, 1868	March 21, 1870	January 1, 1872	June 19, 1892	August 10, 1898	November 7, 1902

Commodore (lower half)	Rear Admiral (upper half)
O-7	O-8
Never Held	May 15, 1908

== Service Medals ==
=== United States awards ===

Civil War Campaign Medal	Philippine Campaign Medal	China Relief Expedition Medal	World War I Victory Medal

The original service criteria for the Spanish Campaign Medal promulgated in Navy Department Special Order No. 81 June 27, 1908, required service on specific vessels and time periods for which Taussig's service during the Spanish–American War did not qualify. However, in the early 1920s, the award criteria were relaxed to provide for award of the medal to all those who served in the U.S. Navy or Marine Corps during the Spanish–American War. The first government contract to supply campaign medals to the expanded recipient base with the Bastian Brothers Company was not until 1922. Rear Admiral Taussig died in January 1921 prior to the expanded eligibility period for the Spanish Campaign and so never received the Spanish Campaign Medal.

== Personal life ==
Edward D. Taussig married Ellen Knefler on November 9, 1873. She was the daughter of Frederick Knefler. They had five sons, including Vice admiral Joseph K. Taussig and Charles, who was a prominent New York attorney. A third son, Paul, died of appendicitis in July 1894, while a midshipman at the U.S. Naval Academy. Edward D. Taussig died at Newport, Rhode Island, on January 29, 1921, and is buried at the United States Naval Academy Cemetery along with his wife and son, Paul.

== Namesake ==
- The Allen M. Sumner class destroyer Taussig (DD-746), commissioned from 1944 to 1974, was named for him.
- Admiral Taussig Boulevard at Naval Station Norfolk in Norfolk, Virginia, is named for him.https://pilotonline.com/news/local/history/article_bc00d5b4-6eb1-5c94-9a6f-a46155a1d245.html

Preceded by José Sisto; Acting / Semi-official	Naval Governor of Guam; 1899	Succeeded by Joaquín Cruz Pérez; Local Council
