= Double outlet right ventricle =

- Specialty: Cardiology

Double outlet right ventricle (DORV) is a form of congenital heart disease where both of the great arteries connect (in whole or in part) to the right ventricle (RV). In some cases it is found that this occurs on the left side of the heart rather than the right side.

== Pathogenesis ==
DORV occurs in multiple forms, with variability of great artery position and size, as well as of ventricular septal defect (VSD) location. It can occur with or without transposition of the great arteries. The clinical manifestations are similarly variable, depending on how the anatomical defects affect the physiology of the heart, in terms of altering the normal flow of blood from the RV and left ventricle (LV) to the aorta and pulmonary artery. For example:

- in DORV with a subaortic VSD, blood from the LV flows through the VSD to the aorta and blood from the RV flows mainly to the pulmonary artery, yielding physiology similar to ventricular septal defect
- in DORV with a subpulmonic VSD (called Taussig-Bing syndrome), blood from the LV flows through the VSD to the pulmonary artery and blood from the RV flows mainly to the aorta, yielding physiology similar to Transposition of the Great Arteries
  - but if there is pulmonic stenosis in addition, physiology resembles Tetralogy of Fallot
- in other forms of DORV, blood from both ventricles is substantially mixed in the RV, yielding physiology that resembles a large VSD
  - but again, if there is pulmonic stenosis, physiology resembles Tetralogy of Fallot

== Treatment ==
DORV is treated with surgery.

== Epidemiology ==
DORV affects between 1% and 3% of people born with congenital heart defects.

Chromosomal abnormalities were reported in about 40% of reported cases in the medical literature.
