= Venancio Roberto =

Governor of Guam
- In office December 31, 1898 – January 2, 1899
- Preceded by: José Sisto
- Succeeded by: José Sisto

Venancio Roberto was a resident of Hagåtña, Guam who briefly seized the office of Commissioner of Guam from December 31, 1898, to January 2, 1899, before his rule was declared illegitimate by Lieutenant Commander Vincendon Cottman of USS Brutus. In 1898, Roberto overthrew José Sisto, and was put in office by a military junta composed of a number of district leaders from around the island; only two days later, the United States Navy decided that Sisto held the legitimate claim to the office, despite Roberto's generally more pro-United States leanings. The coalition, which included local leader Father José Palomo y Torres and former governor Francisco Portusach Martínez, stepped aside until the ownership of Guam could be determined.

Preceded by José Sisto	Governor of Guam; 1898	Succeeded by José Sisto
