= Joseph Taussig =

United States Navy admiral (1877–1947)

Joseph Knefler Taussig
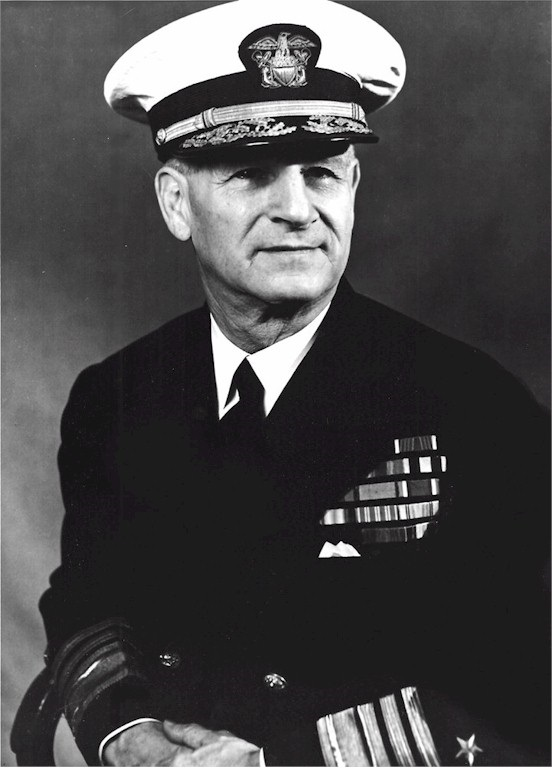
- Vice Admiral Joseph K. Taussig
- Born: August 30, 1877; Dresden, Germany
- Died: October 29, 1947 (aged 70); Bethesda, Maryland, U.S.
- Burial place: Arlington National Cemetery
- Relatives: Rear Admiral Edward D. Taussig (father); Joseph K. Taussig Jr. (son)
- Military career
- Allegiance: United States of America
- Branch: United States Navy
- Service years: 1895–1941, 1943–1947
- Rank: Vice admiral
- Commands: Ammen; Wadsworth; Division 6, Destroyer Force; Division 8, Destroyer Force; Little; Division of Enlisted Personnel, Bureau of Navigation; Columbia; Cleveland; Trenton; Maryland; Battleship Division 3, Battle Force; Cruisers, Scouting Force; Norfolk Navy Yard; Fifth Naval District
- Conflicts: Spanish–American War; Philippine–American War; China Relief Expedition; Cuban Pacification; World War I Second Nicaraguan Campaign; World War II
- Awards: Distinguished Service Medal (World War I service); Legion of Merit; Silver Life Saving Medal; Purple Heart; Order of Saint Michael and Saint George U.K. Order of the Merit of Chile

Joseph Knefler Taussig (30 August 1877 – 29 October 1947) was a vice admiral in the United States Navy. He served in the Spanish–American War, Philippine–American War, China Relief Expedition, Cuban Pacification, World War I, Second Nicaraguan Campaign, and World War II.

== Biography ==
Taussig in US Naval Academy track uniform c. 1897

The son of German-Jewish parents, Edward D. Taussig and his wife Ellen Knefler, the daughter of Frederick Knefler, Joseph Taussig was born in Dresden, Germany, but became a Unitarian upon marrying. One of five sons, he entered the United States Naval Academy (USNA) in 1895. His older brother, Paul Taussig, had been enrolled at the USNA but died the previous July of a sudden onset of acute appendicitis. Joseph Taussig, like his late brother, excelled in athletics at USNA. A football star, he was quarterback for the 1899 Navy team. He also excelled at track and field events and was president of the USNA Athletic Association. He was the second of a four-generational family of United States Naval Academy graduates that served from 1863 to 1970 starting with his father, Rear Admiral Edward D. Taussig (1847–1921), continuing with his son Captain Joseph K. Taussig Jr. (1920–1999), and ending with his grandson, Captain Joseph K. Taussig III USMC (1945–). One of his daughters married George Philip for whom the USS George Philip was named.

== Spanish–American War ==
When the Spanish–American War began in April, 1898, Taussig was in his final year as a cadet (as midshipmen at USNA were known from the latter part of the 19th century until 1902). He was assigned to the flagship of Admiral William T. Sampson, the cruiser New York, and was on board during the bombardment of Aguadores and Santiago and the pivotal naval Battle of Santiago de Cuba on July 3, 1898, where the Spanish fleet was wiped out and Admiral Pascual Cervera taken prisoner.

Taussig was a prolific and talented journalist and writer during his entire 46-year naval career. In later years, his direct and honest candor earned him the professional disfavor of Assistant Secretary of the Navy (and later President of the United States) Franklin D. Roosevelt and Secretary of the Navy Josephus Daniels. In the daily 125 page journal (with an additional 35 pages of imprints) it was said that Taussig maintained of his experiences and observations during the Spanish–American War, he wrote about the troops embarkation from Tampa, Florida, the Army landing at Daiquirí and Siboney, the condition of the Cuban and Spanish armies, the Battle of Santiago de Cuba, a visit to Morro Castle in Havana Harbor and the fleet's triumphal and feted return to New York Navy Yard after the end of hostilities in August 1898. Taussig's journal includes his pencil sketches of troops, ships, locations, maps, and prints of naval personnel involved in the war. He also wrote numerous letters to his father and brother Charles Taussig, who became a well-known attorney in New York City. Returning to complete his studies at the USNA, Taussig graduated in the class of 1899.

== Philippine–American War ==
Following graduation, he was assigned to the protected cruiser Newark which departed New York Naval Yard in March 1899 bound for the Philippines. The ship made ports of call in the Caribbean, Caracas (Venezuela), Montevideo (Uruguay) and ports in Chile and Peru before heading up the California coast to Mare Island Navy Yard near San Francisco for outfitting and repairs prior to deployment with the Asiatic Squadron. Departing from the West Coast, Newark made stops in Hawaii and Guam in transit to the Western Pacific and arrived in Cavite in November 1899. For the next five months, Newark was station ship at Vigan on the island of Luzon. During that time, Taussig was part of a landing party that embarked at Pamplona to rescue American citizens being held hostage by Insurrectos opposed to U.S. control of the Philippines. However, once there, the landing party was ordered to return to the ship. In December, Newark moved to Aparri where it accepted the surrender of the Insurrectos in the provinces of Isabela, Cagayan and Bataan.

== China Relief Expedition (Boxer Rebellion) ==
In April 1900, Newark was ordered to sail to Japan and then to Taku, China as part of the multinational China Relief Expedition being mobilized to rescue the foreign legations in Peking that were then besieged by the Boxers, a movement that opposed the growing influence of European business interests and Christian missionaries in China. The joint naval force was under the command of Vice Admiral Edward Hobart Seymour, Royal Navy with Captain Bowman H. McCalla, USN of the Newark, second in command. As a naval cadet member of the multinational landing force that came to be known as the Seymour Relief Expedition Taussig served alongside and began a long and fraternal professional association with Royal Navy officers Captain John Jellicoe and Lieutenant David Beatty who later advanced to First Sea Lords of the Royal Navy.

On June 7, 1900, the 2,100 strong Seymour Relief Expedition set out from Tientsin by train with the destination Peking and the objective the release of the besieged foreign legations. However, progress was repeatedly halted due to stretches of track that had been torn up by the Boxers and intermittent attacks. The imperial forces of the Dowager Empress were allied with the Boxers and joined in the attacks. Just seven days into its rescue mission, the expedition was forced to retreat to Tientsin due to the rail-bed both north and south of Yang Tsun being destroyed by the Boxers, cutting off the force's supply replenishment. During the retreat, Taussig was seriously wounded in the leg during a Boxer attack. He recovered in Japan and was advanced four numbers in grade because of his injury. Forty-three years later he was awarded the Purple Heart for his combat wounds.

As he had done during the Spanish–American War, Taussig maintained a daily journal of the time he was in the Philippines and subsequently China while attached to Newark as a naval cadet. These include detailed descriptions of his shipmates and officers including Captain Bowman H. McCalla of the Newark, Vice Admiral Seymour, the progress and setback of the Seymour Expedition, the political dynamics, social customs and recreation in China, and drawings of engineering details of Newark and urban scenes in Vigan and Pamplona. Of tactical significance, the journal includes a list of the ports of call for Newark and an intelligence report on the fortifications of Sydney, Australia and the government of New South Wales. Taussig submitted his journal to Captain John Fremont of the Culgoa who attested to it and pronounced it an excellent piece of work. The 120 page journal that Taussig wrote during his time attached to Newark was the basis for his April 1927 article on the Seymour Relief Expedition, one of forty-four articles that he eventually authored for the U.S. Naval Institute magazine Proceedings.

== Cuban pacification and inter-war years ==
Following recuperation from his leg wound, Taussig was assigned to the Nashville in the Philippines and then to the Culgoa, a supply ship carrying food stores for the Army from Australia to the Philippines. Following that, he was assigned to Yorktown commanded by his father, Commander Edward D. Taussig USN. While serving on Yorktown at Yokohama Harbor, Taussig rescued a shipmate who had gone to the rescue of another drowning man. Both men were saved and for his heroism, Taussig was awarded the Silver Life Saving Medal by the U.S. Treasury Department in 1902. Of the numerous personal decorations and service medals he was awarded, it was the medal that Taussig prized most throughout his life.

After two years as a naval cadet, and having participated in three separate conflicts initiated by native interests opposing foreign intervention by the age of twenty-three, Taussig was commissioned ensign on 28 January 1901 to begin a series of promotions and distinctions that would underscore his service to the navy. Returning to the United States from the Asiatic Squadron in 1902, he was assigned to Texas and next served as navigator on Topeka. In 1905 he was on Amphitrite, the station ship at Guantanamo Bay, Cuba. The following year he was navigator and executive officer on Celtic. In 1907, Taussig joined the officer staff of Kansas, one of the ships of the Great White Fleet that circumnavigated the globe in 1907 as a demonstration of U.S. Naval seapower and global presence. After the fleet rounded Cape Horn and steamed up the western coasts of South and North America, he detached from Kansas at Mare Island Navy Yard and was assigned to the staff of his father, Edward D. Taussig, by then a rear admiral and commandant of the Norfolk Navy Yard. In 1910 he was appointed flag secretary and aide to Rear Admiral Charles Vreeland, commander of the 2nd and 4th Divisions of the Atlantic Fleet.

Promoted to lieutenant commander, in 1911 he took command of the destroyer Ammen, followed by an assignment to the Bureau of Navigation in Washington, D.C., until 1915. This duty gave Taussig the background experience which resulted in his exposing personnel shortcomings in the navy following World War I. In 1915, he first locked horns with then Assistant Navy Secretary Franklin D. Roosevelt and Navy Secretary Josephus Daniels when he and several other navy officers, notably Admiral William Sims, were critical of a program that provided for the use of paroled criminals to fill the depleted ranks of enlisted personnel. In 1915, Taussig returned to sea in command of the newly commissioned destroyer Wadsworth and Division 6, Destroyer Force, Atlantic Fleet. The following year, Taussig received promotion to the rank of commander.

== World War I ==
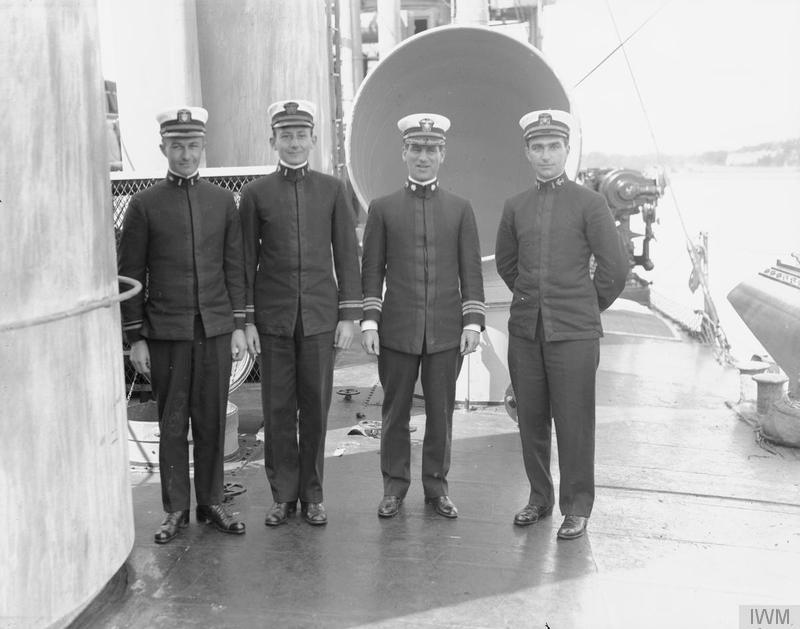
Taussig (second from right) with officers of the Wadsworth during World War I

In July 1916, after serving in battleships, cruisers, destroyers, and on staffs afloat, Taussig was assigned command of Division 8, Destroyer Force (DesDiv 8), Atlantic Fleet. The US entered World War I in April 1917. At that time, Britain was suffering from unchecked U-boat attacks on merchant shipping in the North Atlantic, so in May 1917 President Woodrow Wilson ordered DesDiv 8 to Queenstown, Ireland, to assist the British Royal Navy - the first group of American destroyers sent abroad during the war.

After a nine-day Atlantic crossing, most of the time in a severe southeast gale, DesDiv 8 reached Queenstown, the occasion commemorated in Bernard F. Gribble's Return of the Mayflower. The British commander at Queenstown, Vice Admiral Sir Lewis Bayly, hosted a dinner in the Americans' honor on the night of their arrival. At the dinner, Bayly asked Commander Taussig "When will you be ready to go to sea?" Taussig replied in the now famous words: "We are ready now, sir; that is, as soon as we finish refueling."

For an attack on a German U-boat on 29 July 1917, he was awarded the Distinguished Service Medal, at that time the Navy's second highest valor award. In December 1917, he returned to the US to take command of the newly commissioned destroyer Little. By May 1918, Little was in Europe, patrolling off the coast of France. The journal that Commander Taussig kept of his service in World War I was published in 1996 by the Naval War College Press under the title The Queenstown Patrol, 1917. With the war winding down, he was detached to the Bureau of Navigation in August 1918.

== Conflict with Assistant Navy Secretary Franklin D. Roosevelt ==
Promoted to captain in September 1918, he was assigned to head the Division of Enlisted Personnel of the Bureau of Navigation. Aware of the inadequacies of manpower from his experience in the fleet during World War I, in 1920, he was embroiled in a publicized dispute with Assistant Secretary of the Navy Franklin D. Roosevelt and testified before the U.S. Senate Subcommittee on Navy Affairs regarding the personnel shortage in the navy, stating that navy department heads had failed "to take adequate steps to provide personnel necessary for the proper conduct of the navy during the war." For his outspoken views, Taussig earned the lifetime enmity of Roosevelt, who was in a political fight with the Republican Party over his nomination as Vice President, and wrote a sharp letter to the navy subcommittee denying Taussig's charges.

Taussig candidly maintained that, "the Navy was far from being ready for War... and the enlisted personnel was entirely inadequate for the proper manning of our already completed ships on a peace time basis, and was dangerously inadequate should we suddenly be thrown into war." Secretary Josephus Daniels was angered by Taussig's dissent and denied publication of Taussig's prize-winning essay on naval personnel in the Naval Institute press.

== Inter-war years ==
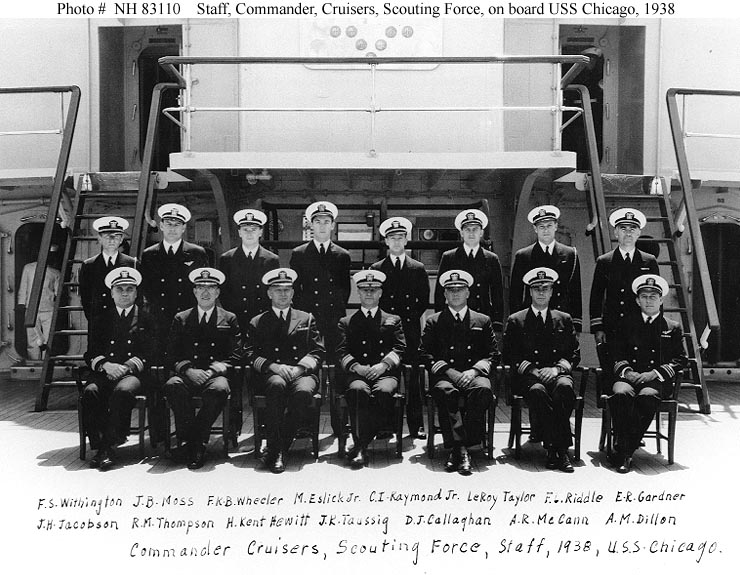
Taussig as commander of Cruisers, Scouting Force, on board Chicago, 1938 (seated, front row, center)

In 1919 he attended the senior course at the Naval War College, graduating in 1920 and appointed to the staff of the president of the Naval War College. The following year he was a staff member in the Tactics Department. In 1921 he was assigned to command Great Northern, later renamed Columbia, briefly flagship of the United States Atlantic Fleet. In 1922 his ship, Cleveland, rendered assistance to the victims of an earthquake and tsunami in Chile. For his actions, he was awarded the Order of the Merit of Chile for his efforts in the earthquake relief during 1922. In 1923, he was Assistant Chief of Staff, to Admiral Hilary P. Jones, Commander-in-Chief, United States Fleet for six months.

From July 1923 to June 1926, he was on the staff of the Naval War College where he was Chairman of the Strategy Department. In 1926, he was given command of the light cruiser Trenton. From 1927 to 1930, he returned to the Naval War College as Chief of Staff and on 16 May 1930, was given command of the battleship Maryland. He was promoted to rear admiral on 1 July 1931 and served as chief of staff to Admiral Richard H. Leigh, Commander, Battle Fleet. In 1933 he was appointed Assistant Chief of Naval Operations in the Navy Department. However, with Franklin D. Roosevelt (FDR) having been inaugurated President of the United States in January of that year, according to Admiral Frederic S. Withington, Taussig never had a chance of promotion beyond rear admiral because of his dispute with FDR in the 1920s. FDR was criticized by newspaper columnists Drew Pearson and Robert S. Allen in 1936 when instead of appointing Taussig commander of the United States Fleet, he was assigned to command Battleship Division 3, Battle Force, with his flag on the Idaho. In 1937, still with the rank of rear admiral, he was appointed commander of Cruisers, Scouting Force, with his flag on the heavy cruiser Chicago. In May 1938, he was attached as commandant, Norfolk Navy Yard and Fifth Naval District, a billet his father Edward D. Taussig had filled thirty years earlier.

== Another clash with FDR ==
In May 1940, Taussig again locked horns with now-president Franklin D. Roosevelt, when Massachusetts Senator David I. Walsh invited Taussig to testify at Senate hearings on plans to expand the navy. Taussig advocated the building of Iowa-class and Montana-class battleships and offered testimony to the aggressive, imperialistic designs of the Empire of Japan that planned to annex China, the Philippines and the Dutch East Indies. He warned of the superiority of the Japanese Merchant fleet to that of the US, and the need to replenish U.S. bases in the Pacific Ocean and prepare for defense of the Philippines, stating, "I cannot see how we can escape being forced into war based on the present trends of events." He also claimed that the Tanaka Memorial was genuine. Taussig's testimony set off a controversy that lasted in the press for weeks and infuriated FDR who wanted Taussig relieved of his command of Norfolk Navy Yard and the Fifth Naval District. However, Chief of Naval Operations Admiral Harold R. Stark convinced Roosevelt to reconsider and Roosevelt took no action; however, Stark publicly stated that Taussig's views were contrary to the Navy Department's and on 23 April 1940, issued a reprimand that was placed in Taussig's file.

== World War II ==
Rear Admiral Taussig was forced to retire in September 1941 due to his age, despite his petition to continue on active duty with the impending international crisis. He was promoted to vice admiral on 22 October 1941 due to his service in the Boxer Rebellion. He had testified to the Senate committee on naval affairs in April 1940 that war with Japan over the Philippines was inevitable without a change in policy. His testimony included accurate predictions on the coming war in the Pacific. According to a May 9, 1940 article by Drew Pearson, Taussig was forced into retirement due to his public prediction that war with Japan was inevitable. In a June 9, 1940 article authored by Drew Pearson and Robert S. Allen, Taussig was referred to as "the star scholar and strategist of the navy."

On 8 December 1941, President Roosevelt ordered the reprimand removed from Taussig's personnel file, after his son, Ensign Joseph K. Taussig Jr. was severely wounded and lost his leg, earning a Navy Cross while serving on the Nevada during the Japanese attack on Pearl Harbor.

Taussig's request to return to active duty was ultimately granted in 1943 and he served in the office of the Secretary of the Navy on the Naval Clemency and Prison Inspection Board, the Naval Discipline Policy Review Board, and the Procurement and Retirement Board, until 1 June 1947, only a few months before his death.

Vice Admiral Taussig died on 29 October 1947 at Bethesda Naval Hospital. He was one of a very few individuals who served in the Spanish-American War, World War I and World War II.

His survivors then included his wife of 38 years, Lulie Johnston Taussig, of Washington, D.C. and Jamestown, RI; two daughters, Mrs. Emily Whitney Sherman, of Newport, RI and Mrs. Margaret Philip Helmer of Irvine, CA and his son Captain Joseph K. Taussig Jr. of Annapolis, MD. His daughter Margaret had been married to Commander George Philip Jr. until his death in 1945.

== Decorations and awards ==

Navy Distinguished Service Medal	Legion of Merit	Silver Life Saving Medal
Purple Heart Medal	Sampson Medal	Spanish Campaign Medal
Philippine Campaign Medal	China Relief Expedition Medal	Cuban Pacification Medal
World War I Victory Medal with "Destroyer" clasp	Second Nicaraguan Campaign Medal	American Defense Service Medal
American Campaign Medal	World War II Victory Medal	Order of Saint Michael and Saint George U.K.

=== Navy Distinguished Service Medal Citation ===
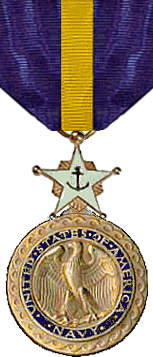

The President of the United States of America takes pleasure in presenting the Navy Distinguished Service Medal to Captain Joseph Knefler Taussig, Sr., United States Navy, for exceptionally meritorious service in a duty of great responsibility as Commanding Officer of the U.S.S. WADSWORTH, engaged in the important, exacting, and hazardous duty of patrolling the waters infested with enemy submarines and mines, in escorting and protecting vitally important convoys of troops and supplies through these waters, and in offensive and defensive action, vigorously and unremittingly prosecuted against all forms of enemy naval activity; and especially for a successful attack upon an enemy submarine on 29 July 1917.

== Namesake ==
- The destroyer escort Joseph K. Taussig (DE-1030) was named in his honor, while the destroyer Taussig (DD-746) was named in honor of his father.
- Admiral Taussig Blvd. in Norfolk, Virginia, near Naval Station Norfolk, is named in his honor.
- Taussig Street in Tierrasanta, California in Murphy Canyon Military Housing is named in his honor.

== Miscellaneous ==
- His son was married to the daughter of Admiral Robert Carney.

His granddaughter is married to radio talk show host and lawyer Hugh Hewitt.

== Published works ==
- Our Navy, A Fighting Team (1943) Whittlesey House – co-authored by Harley F. Cope

== Publications ==
- "Sees U.S. Involved in Far East War, Admiral Taussig Testifies that Japan Aims at Domination – Navy Disclaims His Views" New York Times April 23, 1940, page 1.
- Three Splendid Little Wars: The Diaries of Joseph Knefler Taussig, 1898–1901 [edited by Evelyn M. Cherpak] (January 2009) Naval War College Press. ISBN 978-0-16-082792-1
- The Queenstown Patrol, 1917: The Diary of Commander Joseph Knefler Taussig, U.S. Navy (June 1996) Naval War College Press. ISBN 978-1-884733-07-9
- Vaughn, Stephen L. Encyclopedia of American Journalism. CRC Press, 2008, p. 384 includes Drew Pearson's reporting on Taussig's "retirement".

== See also ==
- List of select Jewish football players
