= Frederick Knefler =

Union army general in the American Civil War (1824–1901)

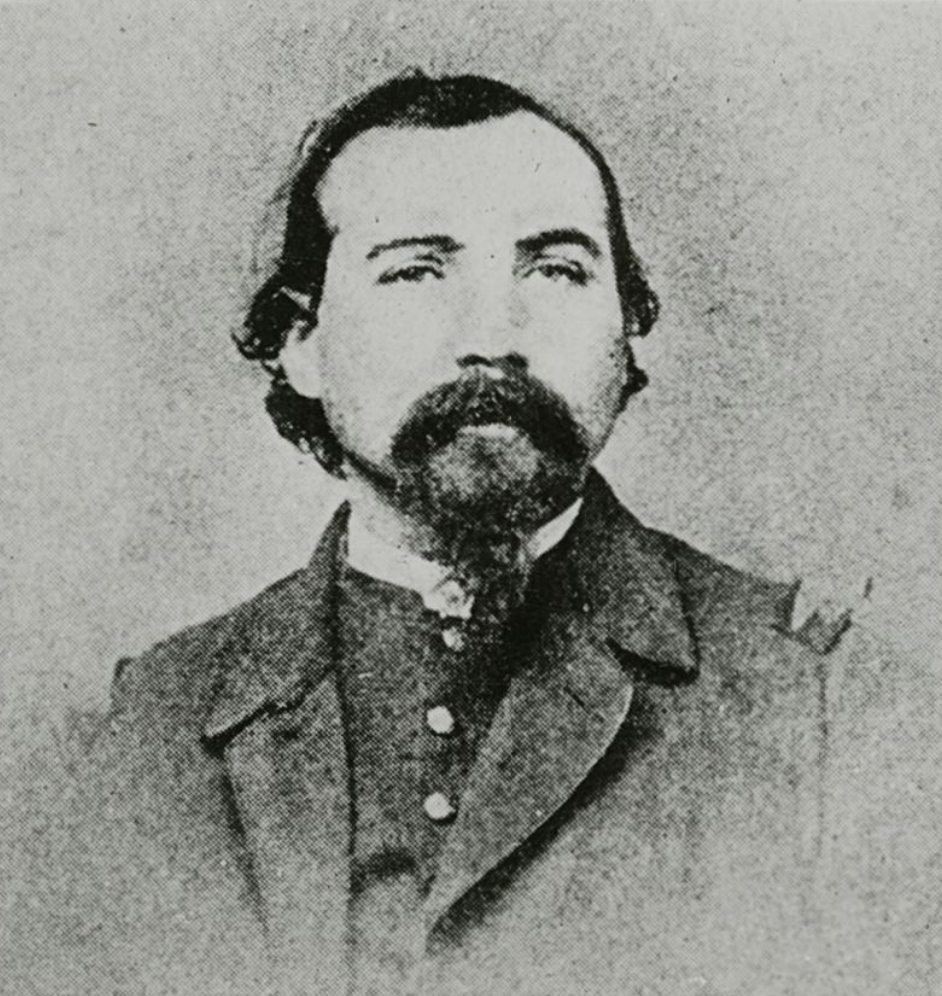
- Knefler c. 1860s
- Born: April 12, 1833; Arad, Hungary
- Died: June 14, 1901 (aged 68); Indianapolis, Indiana, US
- Burial place: Crown Hill Cemetery and Arboretum, Section 8, Lot 22 Indianapolis, Indiana; 39.8200547°N 86.1724304°W
- Military career
- Allegiance: United States of America; Union
- Branch: United States Army; Union Army
- Service years: 1861-1865
- Rank: Colonel brevet brigadier general
- Commands: 11th Indiana Infantry; 79th Indiana Infantry
- Conflicts: American Civil War; Battle of Shiloh; Battle of Stones River; Battle of Pickett's Mill; Battle of Lovejoy's Station; Second Battle of Franklin; Battle of Nashville
- Other work: Carpenter; Attorney

Frederick Knefler (April 12, 1833 – June 14, 1901) served in the Union Army in the American Civil War, joining as a first lieutenant in May 1861. He served as a staff officer and as colonel of the 79th Indiana Infantry Regiment and an acting brigade commander. In 1866, he was nominated and confirmed for appointment to the grade of brevet brigadier general of volunteers, to rank from March 13, 1865. His daughter married Edward Taussig and he was the grandfather of Joseph Taussig, the great-grandfather of Joseph K. Taussig Jr. and great-great-grandfather of Captain Joseph K. Taussig III USMC (born 1945).

== Early life ==
Frederick Knefler (Knoepfler Frigyes) was born in Arad, Hungary in 1833, the son of Nathan Knoepfler, a Hungarian Jew and a physician. He enlisted with his father in the revolutionary forces during the 1848-49 Hungarian War of Liberation. After the revolutionary forces were defeated, the entire Knoepfler family fled to the United States, first to New York, then to Indianapolis, Indiana. As one of the earliest Jewish families settling in Indianapolis, Dr. Knoepfler was one of the original founders of the Indianapolis Hebrew Congregation.

Knefler trained as a carpenter in New York, a trade he continued in Indianapolis as he studied law. He became assistant to the clerk of Marion County, Indiana, in which position he became acquainted with Lew Wallace.

== Civil War service ==
=== 11th Indiana Infantry ===
Upon President Lincoln's proclamation calling for the raising of 75,000 troops after the firing on Fort Sumter, Governor Oliver Morton appointed Lew Wallace Adjutant-General with the task of raising Indiana's quota. Wallace, in turn, appointed Knefler as his principal assistant. After raising five regiments, Wallace requested and received command of the 11th Indiana Infantry Regiment, commissioning Knefler as a first lieutenant in it; he was promoted to captain on June 5, 1861.

The 11th Indiana Infantry was sent to the Washington, D.C., area, participated in several skirmishes, but missed the first battle of Bull Run. Their 3-month term of enlistment expired, the regiment was shipped back to Indianapolis and mustered out. When Wallace then formed a new 11th Indiana Infantry in August 1861, Knefler was commissioned a captain in it. Soon after, however, Wallace became a brigadier general and Knefler went with him as his assistant adjutant general.

=== Aide to General Lew Wallace ===
Wallace's brigade was part of Grant's force in the capture of Fort Henry and Fort Donelson, playing a key part in preventing the Confederate forces from forcing an escape from Fort Donelson through the Union lines. Wallace's report of the battle stated that Knefler's “prompt and efficient service in the field” and his “courage and fidelity have earned my lasting gratitude.”

Knefler was also with Wallace in the Battle of Shiloh, and his loss of the messenger's written transcription of Grant's oral order during the battle probably prevented resolution of the dispute between the two generals over whether the ambiguity of the order or Wallace's actions caused his failure to reach the battle on the first day.

=== Colonel of 79th Indiana Infantry ===
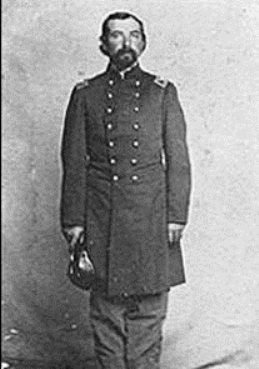
Colonel Frederick Knefler, c. 1862

After Wallace's removal from active service, Indiana governor Oliver Morton appointed Knefler the commanding colonel of the newly formed 79th Indiana Infantry Regiment in August 1862. Sent to join Buell's Army of the Ohio, his regiment, as part of the brigade led by Brigadier General Samuel Beatty, became involved in the battles of Stones River, Chickamauga, and Missionary Ridge. At Stones River, Knefler reported his regiment lost one-third of its 341 men, including one-half of its commissioned officers. The 79th Indiana captured a key battery during the first day of Chickamauga, but was cut in half in the Confederate breakthrough on the second day, Knefler's half attempting to regroup Beatty's brigade until withdrawn, the other half helping hold Snodgrass Hill until the Confederate charge was finally repulsed. In the battle of Missionary Ridge, Knefler was in command of the combined 79th Indiana and 86th Indiana infantry regiments that led the unexpected charge up the center of the ridge. General Beatty's report after the battle complimented Knefler for the charging of Missionary Ridge, and fellow colonel George Dick wrote that he “richly merits a commission as brigadier-general for his gallantry displayed in the charging and taking of Missionary Ridge.”

According to the Jewish-American History Foundation in recognition of the services rendered by the regiment at Chickamauga, the state of Indiana erected a monument on the battlefield after the war. The tablet of the monument reads:

INDIANA'S TRIBUTE TO HER SEVENTY-NINTH REGIMENT INFANTRY

Col. Frederick Knefler, Commanding First Brigade (Samuel Beatty) Third Division (Van Cleve) Twenty-first Corps (Crittenden)

=== Atlanta Campaign ===
Following Missionary Ridge, the 79th Indiana moved toward Knoxville and participated in the east Tennessee winter campaign until transferred to join General Sherman's Atlanta Campaign. During this campaign, because of General Beatty's illness, Knefler was given command of the entire brigade, although remaining a colonel. Knefler's brigade participated in the entire campaign, playing a major role in the battles of Pickett's Mill, Peach Tree Creek, Jonesboro, and Lovejoy's Station, and marching into Atlanta.

=== Franklin-Nashville Campaign ===
When Confederate general Hood decided to cut Sherman's supply line by invading Tennessee, Knefler's brigade was one of those sent to join General Thomas to counter Hood. In the battle of Franklin, Knefler's brigade guarded one flank as Hood put all his effort into a massive charge on the Union center, and thus suffered few casualties. In the battle of Nashville, Knefler's brigade on December 16, 1864, formed the reserve behind which the two charging brigades reformed after being repulsed. He then ordered his brigade to charge the confused enemy, forcing them into retreat and capturing much of their arms.

Knefler's brigade was part of the army preparing to move from east Tennessee into Virginia when the war ended. Following the final review of Thomas's army in Nashville on May 9, 1865, he returned with the 79th Indiana Infantry to Indianapolis, where he was mustered out on June 7, 1865.

=== Brevet brigadier general appointment ===
On January 13, 1866, President Andrew Johnson nominated Knefler for appointment to the grade of brevet brigadier general of volunteers, to rank from March 13, 1865, and the United States Senate confirmed the appointment on March 12, 1866.

== Post-war activities ==
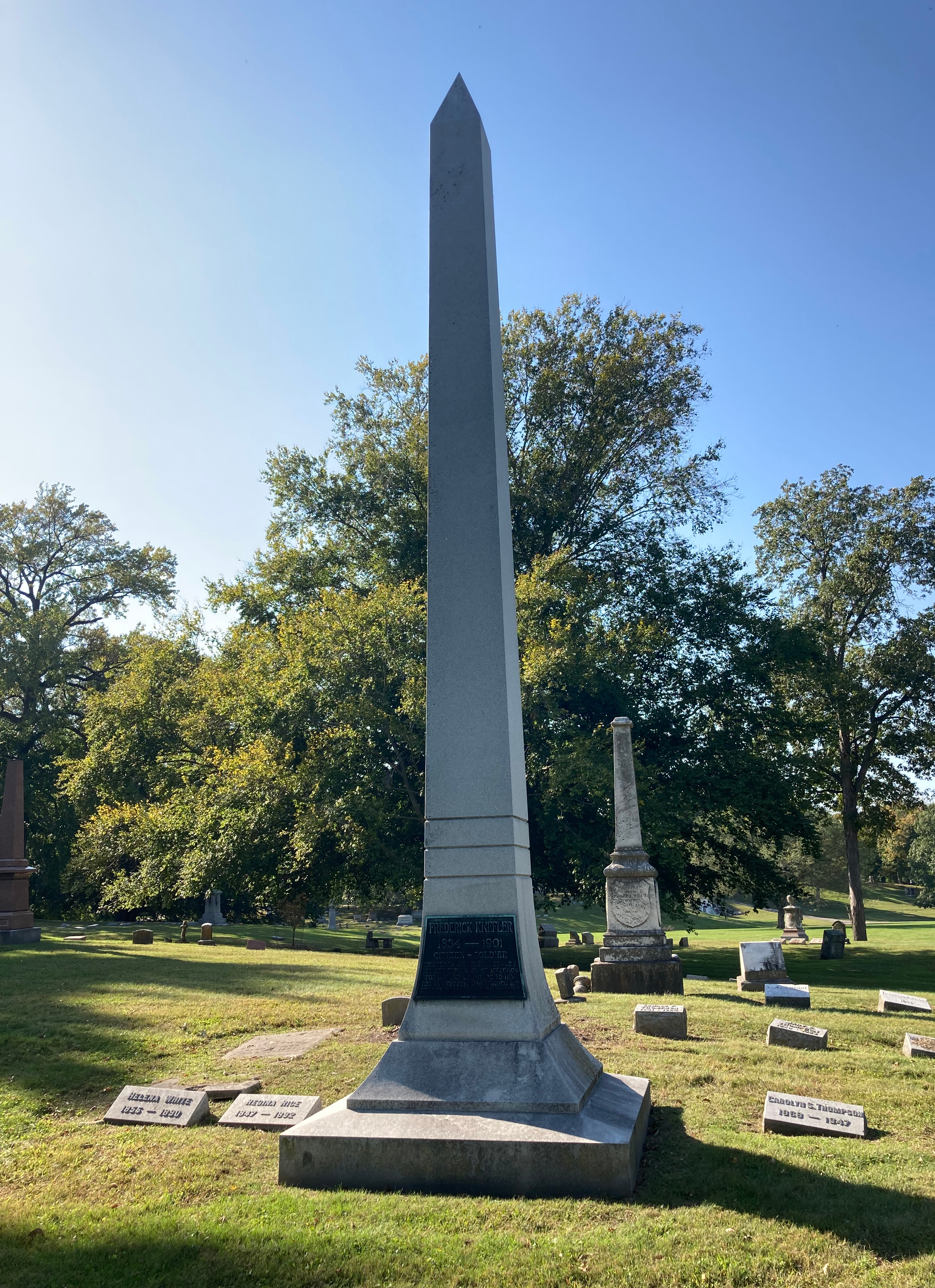
Knefler's grave at Crown Hill Cemetery

Following the war, Knefler became a lawyer in Indianapolis, joining in partnership with former U. S. Attorney John Hanna. After his partner was elected in Congress in 1876, Knefler was appointed head of the pension office in Indianapolis by President Rutherford B. Hayes, where he served eight years. As president of the board of regents of Indiana's Soldiers and Sailors Monument, he oversaw the laying of the cornerstone in the center of Indianapolis on August 22, 1889, but died before its completion in 1902.

Frederick Knefler died on June 14, 1901, in Indianapolis, Indiana, and is buried Crown Hill Cemetery in Section 8, Lot 22.

== See also ==
- List of American Civil War brevet generals (Union)
