= USS George Philip =

1978 Oliver Hazard Perry-class frigate

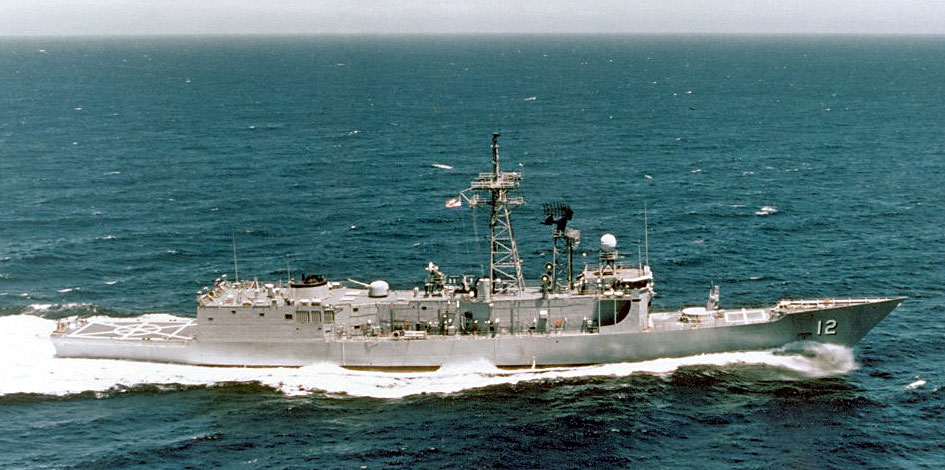
- USS George Philip underway during sea trials in 1982

History

United States
- Name: George Philip
- Namesake: Commander George Philip Jr.
- Ordered: 27 February 1976
- Builder: Todd Pacific Shipyards, Los Angeles Division, San Pedro, California
- Laid down: 14 December 1977
- Launched: 16 December 1978
- Sponsored by: Snow Philip-Simpson, daughter of Commander Philip
- Commissioned: 10 October 1980
- Decommissioned: 15 March 2003
- Stricken: 24 May 2004
- Home port: San Diego, California (former)
- Identification: Hull symbol:FFG-12; Code letters:NSGP
- Motto: "Intrepide Impelle"; (To Go Boldly)
- Fate: Scrapped 2015 at Southern Recycling, Port Fourchon, Louisiana
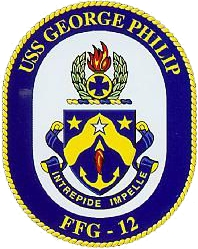
- Badge

General characteristics
- Class & type: Oliver Hazard Perry-class frigate
- Displacement: 4,100 long tons (4,200 t), full load
- Length: 445 feet (136 m), overall
- Beam: 45 feet (14 m)
- Draft: 22 feet (6.7 m)
- Propulsion: 2 × General Electric LM2500-30 gas turbines generating 41,000 shp (31 MW) through a single shaft and variable pitch propeller; 2 × Auxiliary Propulsion Units, 350 hp (260 kW) retractable electric azimuth thrusters for maneuvering and docking.
- Speed: over 29 knots (54 km/h)
- Range: 5,000 nautical miles at 18 knots (9,300 km at 33 km/h)
- Complement: 15 officers and 190 enlisted, plus SH-60 LAMPS detachment of roughly six officer pilots and 15 enlisted maintainers
- Sensors & processing systems: AN/SPS-49 air-search radar; AN/SPS-55 surface-search radar; CAS and STIR fire-control radar; AN/SQS-56 sonar.
- Electronic warfare & decoys: AN/SLQ-32
- Armament: As built: 1 × OTO Melara Mk 75 76 mm/62 caliber naval gun; 2 × Mk 32 triple-tube (324 mm) launchers for Mark 46 torpedoes; 1 × Vulcan Phalanx CIWS; 4 × .50-cal (12.7 mm) machine guns.; 1 × Mk 13 Mod 4 single-arm launcher for Harpoon anti-ship missiles and SM-1MR Standard anti-ship/air missiles (40 round magazine); Note: As of 2004, Mk 13 systems removed from all active US vessels of this class.
- Aircraft carried: 1 × SH-2F LAMPS I helicopter

USS George Philip (FFG-12), sixth ship of the Oliver Hazard Perry class of guided-missile frigates, was named for Commander George Philip Jr. (1912–1945), posthumous recipient of the Navy Cross for actions as commanding officer of the destroyer USS Twiggs.

George Philip was expected to join the Portuguese Navy in 2006, together with her sister ship Sides, but the Portuguese Navy dropped the offer and chose two Dutch Karel Doorman-class frigates instead. George Philip was expected to join the Turkish Navy in the summer of 2008, together with her sister ship Sides, but the Turkish Navy dropped the offer. As of May 2012, both frigates were awaiting their fates at anchor in the Sinclair Inlet off the Puget Sound Naval Shipyard and Intermediate Maintenance Facility.

== Namesake ==
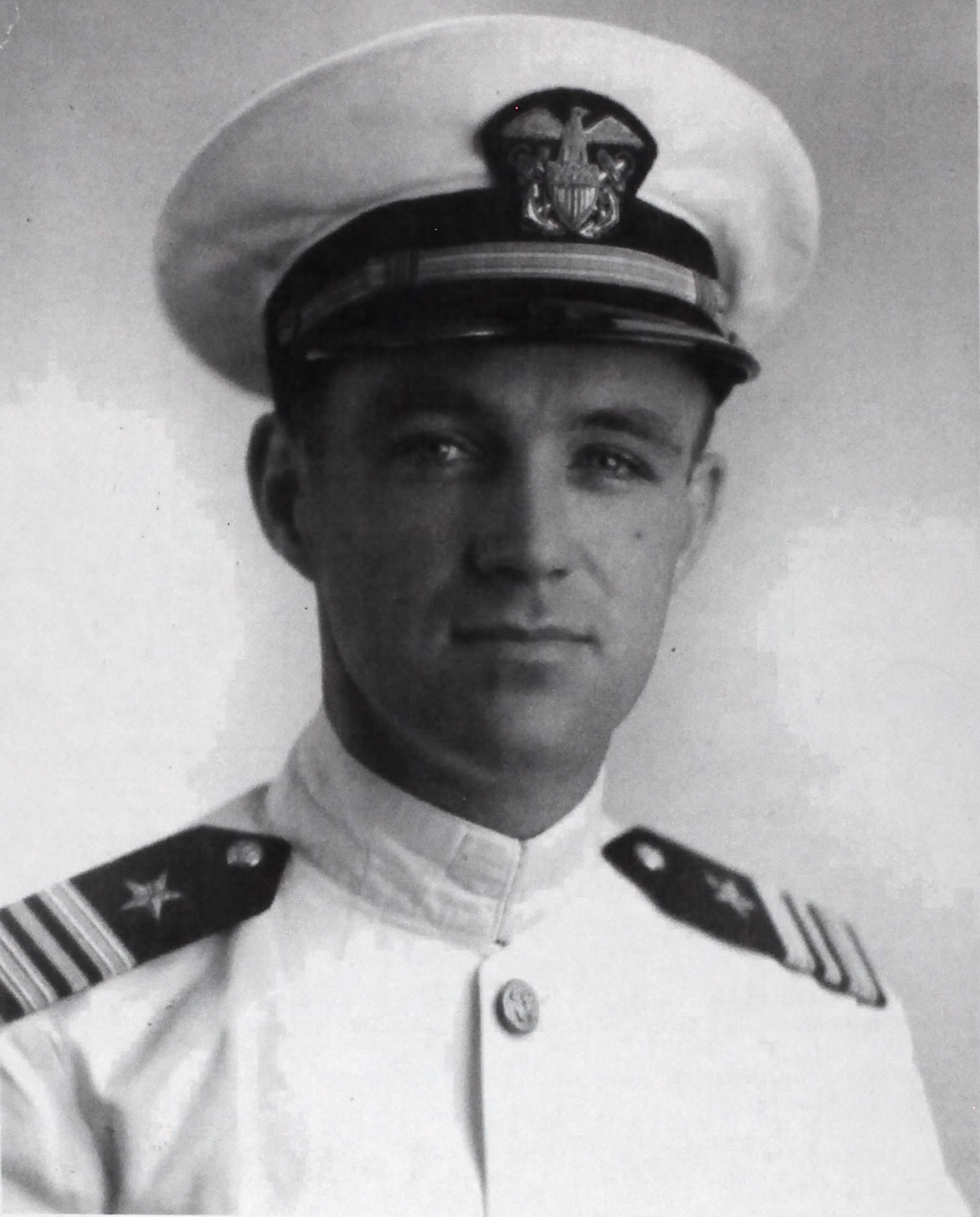
George Philip Jr. as a LCDR

George Philip Jr. was born on 14 April 1912 in Fort Pierre, South Dakota, to George Philip (1880 – 1948), a Scottish immigrant from Morayshire, Scotland and Alice Island "Isle" Waldron (1890 – 1972), of part Oglala Lakota descent and also born in Fort Pierre. He was known as Geordie. He attended the South Dakota School of Mines in Rapid City, South Dakota before his appointment to the United States Naval Academy. After completion of the course of instruction at the Naval Academy, he was commissioned an ensign on 6 June 1935. He continued to progress in grade until his promotion to Commander on 4 September 1944. During this period he served under a variety of commands including: USS Mississippi (1935–37), USS California (1937–38), USS Ellet (1938–40), USS O'Bannon (1942-43). For his service during the Solomon Islands campaign, Philip was awarded the Silver Star Medal and O'Bannon received the Presidential Unit Citation. He then served with Operational Training Command, Pacific Fleet, San Diego, California (1943–44).

He then served as Commanding Officer of USS Twiggs (1944–45). On 16 June 1945 while operating off Okinawa Twiggs was hit by a Japanese kamikaze aircraft. According to eyewitness Chief Machinist's mate Charles F. Schmidt, Commander Philip was last seen mortally wounded, grasping the railing of the bridge trying to stand. Philip and 151 other crewmen were killed or missing when Twiggs sank. He was posthumously awarded the Navy Cross. On 12 March 1946, Secretary of the Navy James Forrestal stated, during the presentation of the Navy Cross to his widow, Margaret Taussig-Philip:

His courage, fortitude and initiative in the performance of a difficult and hazardous duty characterized Commander Philip as a brilliant leader and seaman, reflecting the highest credit upon himself and the United States Naval Service, he gallantly gave his life in the service of his country.

— James Forrestal

Captain Philip was the son in law of Joseph Taussig, brother in law of Joseph K. Taussig Jr. and uncle of Captain Joseph K. Taussig III USMC.

== History ==
Ordered from Todd Pacific Shipyards, Los Angeles Division, San Pedro, California on 27 February 1976 as part of the FY76 program, George Philip was laid down on 14 December 1977, launched on 16 December 1978, and commissioned on 10 October 1980. Decommissioned on 15 March 2003, as of June 2003 George Philip was in reserve at Naval Inactive Ships Maintenance Facility Bremerton, Washington.

=== 1980s ===
George Philip was sponsored by Snow Philip-Simpson, daughter of the ship's namesake, George Philip Jr. at the ship launching on 16 December 1978. George Philip was commissioned 15 November 1980 at Todd Shipyard in San Pedro, California.

From November 1980 to June 1981 George Philip conducted sea trials and testing. In June 1981 the ship received the Battle "E" award for excellence.

From July 1982 to February 1983 George Philip deployed for the first time in support of USS Enterprise battle group. George Philip and her crew were awarded a Battle Effectiveness Award for operations during the 18-month period from 1 January 1982 to 30 June 1983.

From September 1984 to March 1985 the ship was deployed in support of U. S. efforts to keep sea lanes open in the Persian Gulf during the height of the Iran–Iraq War. In June 1985 the frigate transferred to the Naval Reserve Force (NRF). As a member of the NRF, the focus turns to the training and readiness of Selected Reservists. The ship goes from full manning to 60% manning, with the remainder made up of Reservists. From June 1985 to June 1987 engineering and weapons readiness examinations and inspections were performed along with training for helicopter pilots.

George Philip underwent an overhaul at Southwest Marine in San Diego, California from December 1987 to June 1989. While in overhaul the ship received major upgrades in anti-submarine warfare (ASW) capabilities among which, the ship was fitted with a Tactical Towed Array Sonar (TACTASS).

From June 1989 to May 1992 George Philip participated in extensive ASW operations and was used as a test platform for the new ASW equipment.

=== 1990s ===
From May to August 1992 George Philip was deployed in support of efforts to counter drug traffic from South America to the United States. In August 1992 the ship began a series of independent operations and port visits that included: San Francisco; Seattle; Vancouver, British Columbia; and Mazatlán, Mexico.

These operations lasted until July 1994 when George Philip deployed in support of efforts to counter drug traffic from South America to the United States. In October 1994 the frigate was escort to the towing of the retired submarine USS Richard B. Russell to Bremerton Naval Station.

George Philip and her crew were awarded a Battle Effectiveness Award for operations in 1994, 1995 and 1996.

In November 1997 the ship participated in the Maritime Combined Operational Training (MARCOT) Exercise in the Northern Pacific. From January to April 1998 George Philip took part in counter-narcotics operations (CNOPS) in the South Pacific.

From March to October 1999 the ship was assigned to the Co-operation Afloat Readiness and Training (CARAT) Deployment.

=== 2000s ===
George Philip underwent the Dry-Docking Selected Restricted Availability (DSRA 00) at Continental Marine in San Diego from January to March 2000 In April George Philip transited to Alaska. The frigate conducted port visits to Esquimalt, British Columbia and Juneau, Alaska. On 2–8 October 2000 the ship made a port visit to Ensenada, Mexico.

George Philip was decommissioned on 15 March 2003, as of June 2003 the ship was in reserve at Puget Sound Naval Shipyard and Intermediate Maintenance Facility, Bremerton, Washington.
