= José Sisto =

Governor of Guam

Don José Sisto Rodrigo

5th Commissioner of Guam
- In office January 2, 1899 – February 1, 1899
- Preceded by: Venancio Roberto
- Succeeded by: Edward D. Taussig

3rd Commissioner of Guam
- In office 1898 – December 31, 1898
- Preceded by: Francisco Martínez Portusach
- Succeeded by: Venancio Roberto

José Sisto, also called José Sisto Rodrigo and José Sixto, was twice Governor of Guam, first after overthrowing Francisco Martínez Portusach, and again after being legitimately placed in the position by the United States government. He served as Spanish administrator of the Public Treasury in Guam until the United States captured the island during the Spanish–American War. When Martínez was named Commissioner, Sisto quickly staged a coup d'état and claimed the position as the highest ranking Spanish official on the island. He began arming native guards and commandeering ammunition, but was briefly overthrown by Venancio Roberto and other pro-American elements on December 31, 1898, but was officially put into power by officers of the United States Navy only two days later after they decided he held a legitimate claim to the position. His second term was brief, and he officially relinquished control on February 1, 1899 after learning that the United States had obtained Guam.

== Spanish government ==
During the last period of Spanish rule in Guam, Sisto served as the administer of the Hacienda Publica, of Public Treasury, for the Spanish government on the island. After the Capture of Guam, Sisto was one of the few Spanish officials left on the island.

== Governorship ==
=== Overthrow ===
After the Capture of Guam by the United States during the Spanish–American War, the territorial Spanish government was deposed; eventually, Francisco Portusach Martínez, the only American citizen on the island, was named Commissioner. However, Sisto claimed the authority to rule under Spanish law and because he was the highest-ranking Spanish official left on the island. He overthrew Governor Martínez and took control of the government, while at the same time naming himself provisional governor of the Mariana Islands.

Upon taking control, he instituted a six dollar tax per head, armed local militia, and commandeered fifteen tons of powder and ammunition. Sisto declared American rule of the island void because the 1884 Berlin Conference stated that a country had to actively occupy a territory with a military force to claim ownership of a seized territory, though the United States did not take part in the conference. He formed a coalition consisting of most of the island's priests and other pro-Spanish parties. Sisto, soon ran into conflict with the native population after releasing a leper from an Asan, Guam hospital. An outbreak of whooping cough brought further tensions when 100 native children died from the disease. By December 1898, Sisto had emptied the treasury, mainly by paying salaries far in advance, and violence erupted in the form of riots between natives. Eventually, local district leaders, including Father José Palomo and former governor Martínez removed Sisto from office and placed Venancio Roberto in the position on December 31, 1898.

=== Official appointment ===
Roberto only held the office for two days, when Lieutenant Commander Vincendon Cottman of the USS Brutus arrived on the island. He heard arguments from both the pro-United States Roberto faction and Sisto, deciding that Sisto had a legitimate claim to the office and re-instated him. His second term lasted less than a month, during which the island experienced relative peace free of communication from the outside world. When news of the 1898 Treaty of Paris reached the island, Sisto acknowledged that ownership of Guam had officially been transferred to the United States, and relinquished his position on February 1, 1899. He left the island in May 1899 on the Spanish ship Elcano. He was exiled to Manila.
