= USS Joseph K. Taussig =

Dealey-class destroyer escort

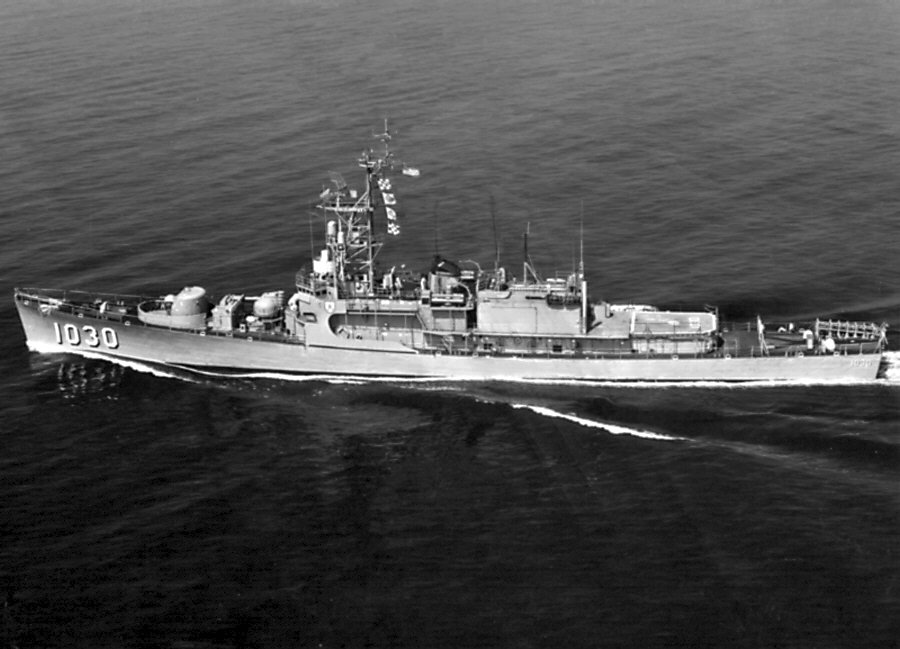
- USS Joseph K. Taussig (DE-1030)

History

United States
- Name: USS Joseph K. Taussig
- Namesake: Joseph Taussig
- Builder: New York Shipbuilding Company
- Laid down: 3 January 1956
- Launched: 9 March 1957
- Commissioned: 10 September 1957
- Decommissioned: 1 July 1972
- Stricken: 1 July 1972
- Motto: We Are Ready Now
- Fate: Sold for scrap, 15 June 1973

General characteristics
- Class & type: Dealey-class destroyer escort
- Displacement: 1,877 long tons (1,907 t) full load
- Length: 314 ft 6 in (95.86 m)
- Beam: 36 ft 9 in (11.20 m)
- Draft: 18 ft (5.5 m)
- Propulsion: 2 × Foster-Wheeler boilers; 1 × De Laval geared turbine; 20,000 shp (15 MW); 1 shaft
- Speed: 27 knots (31 mph; 50 km/h)
- Range: 6,000 nmi (11,000 km) at 12 kn (14 mph; 22 km/h)
- Complement: 170
- Armament: 4 × 3 inch/50 caliber guns; 1 × Squid ASW mortar; 6 × 324 mm (12.8 in) Mark 32 torpedo tubes; Mark 46 torpedoes

USS Joseph K. Taussig (DE-1030) was a Dealey-class destroyer escort in the United States Navy. She was named after Admiral Joseph Taussig. Joseph K. Taussig was laid down 3 January 1956 by the New York Shipbuilding Corporation, Camden, New Jersey; launched 9 March 1957; sponsored by Mrs. Joseph K. Taussig, widow of Vice Admiral Taussig, and commissioned 10 September 1957.

== Service history ==
=== 1950s ===
Following a Caribbean shakedown Joseph K. Taussig reported to Newport, Rhode Island on 22 December for duty with the Atlantic Fleet. She departed Newport on 12 May 1958 for Mediterranean service with the 6th Fleet. During this tour a crisis erupted in Lebanon, and the 6th Fleet was dispatched to the area to prevent a Communist takeover. Joseph K. Taussig was at the scene, giving credibility to her namesake's words; "We are ready now." The destroyer escort remained on patrol until the crisis subsided, and then returned to Newport 7 October.

She was assigned to an antisubmarine warfare group and continued these operations until 6 February 1959 when she made a goodwill cruise to South America. Upon completion of an overhaul at Boston Naval Shipyard, Joseph K. Taussig operated out of Newport prior to Caribbean exercises during January 1960. She returned to Newport 14 February and resumed operations along the Atlantic coast.

=== 1960s ===
The destroyer escort traveled to the North Atlantic 6 September for NATO exercises, before resuming coastal operations upon her return to Newport on 20 October.

During January and February 1961, Joseph K. Taussig once again participated in annual exercises in the Caribbean and in April engaged in joint American-Canadian exercises off Nova Scotia. For the remainder of the year she operated in a state of readiness along the Atlantic coast and in mid February 1962 commenced 6 months of extensive ASW exercises.

During October, intelligence reports revealed evidence of Russian missile installations in Cuba. This led to President Kennedy establishing a naval quarantine around the island. Joseph K. Taussig was ordered off Jacksonville, Fla., in November to provide a second line of defense.

With the easing of tensions, she began preparations for a goodwill cruise to Africa, and departed Newport 15 February 1963. After visiting nine African and three Mediterranean ports, she returned Newport 25 May for summer convoy escort exercises and Cuban patrol duty. From August to December, Joseph K. Taussig engaged in coastal training operations.

Between January and May 1965 Joseph K. Taussig received DASH installation at Boston Naval Shipyard and after completing training in the Caribbean, she participated in the massive amphibious exercise, Operation Steel Pike I, in October. During the remainder of 1965 and throughout 1966, she trained along the Atlantic Coast and in the Caribbean and, in addition, served as sonar school ship at Key West. Early in 1966 she began six months of duty as an E-4 training ship to train seamen as petty officers in response to the growing commitment of the Navy in the troubled waters of Southeast Asia. She resumed squadron training exercises in July. During the next 12 months she operated from New England waters to the Caribbean.

== Fate ==
She was stricken from the Navy register on 1 July 1972, and sold for scrap 15 June 1973.
