= Walter Taussig =

Austrian conductor (1908–2003)

Walter Taussig (February 9, 1908 – July 31, 2003) was an Austrian orchestra conductor. He was born in Vienna, and died in New York, New York, US.

A member of the music staff at the Metropolitan Opera since 1949, Taussig was the company's associate conductor at the time of his death. Taussig was a 1928 graduate of the Music Academy in Vienna, where he studied composition with Franz Schmidt and conducting with Robert Heger. The political climate of Europe in the late 1930s caused Taussig to emigrate to the United States (along with his mother and sister, the acclaimed mathematician Herta Freitag), by way of Havana (where he conducted the Havana Philharmonic).

The conductor worked at the Chicago Opera, the Montreal Opera and San Francisco Opera before being hired by the Met as its assistant chorus master. He established himself as a coach, especially in German repertoire, serving as mentor to several generations of Met singers, from Birgit Nilsson, who called him "the father" of her Elektra, to Plácido Domingo, who coached the role of Parsifal with him, and Deborah Voigt. His principal conducting credits with the Met numbered fewer than a dozen performances, among them La Traviata on the company's 1975 tour of Japan - but in Der Rosenkavalier and in other operas, Taussig was a frequent leader of the Met's offstage instrumentalists, nicknamed "The Taussig Philharmonic" by James Levine.

Taussig was also a coach for Deutsche Grammophon recordings and, beginning in 1964, had an eighteen-year association with the Salzburg Festival as an assistant conductor and coach.

Ira Siff wrote an interview with Maestro Taussig entitled "The Associate" in the April 2001 issue of Opera News.
