= Taussig–Bing syndrome =

- Other names: Taussig–Bing anomaly, Taussig–Bing malformation
- Specialty: Cardiac surgery
- Usual onset: In utero
- Diagnostic method: Fetal anatomy ultrasound, Echocardiography, CT, MRI
- Differential diagnosis: D-transposition of the great arteries with VSD
- Treatment: Surgery

Taussig-Bing syndrome (TBS, also referred to as “Taussig-Bing anomaly” or "Taussig-Bing malformation") is a rare congenital heart disease in which the heart cannot effectively pump oxygenated blood to the rest of the body due to abnormal connections between the large heart arteries and the heart chambers. Specifically, the pulmonary artery and aorta both aberrantly feed into the right side of the heart in those with TBS, termed a "double outlet right ventricle". Normally, the pulmonary artery only is connected to the right side of the heart, and the aorta is connected to the left side of the heart. In those with TBS, there is also a "hole" between the heart chambers, known as a ventricular septal defect (VSD). This hole is located below the pulmonary artery, which differentiates TBS from other types of double outlet right ventricle syndromes.

It is often diagnosed before or shortly after birth with ultrasound. It is treated with open heart surgery in the first few weeks to months of life. Outcomes are good for those that undergo surgical repair.

== Pathophysiology ==
Blood flow in a normal heart. PA=pulmonary artery, Ao=aorta, IVS=interventricular septum. In anatomic position (L and R are switched as if you are facing a patient). For the purposes of visualizing blood flow only; much of the cardiac anatomy is not denoted or correctly positioned in this image in order to simplify visuals.

As noted above, in TBS, both the pulmonary artery and the aorta are connected to the right side of the heart (known as a “double outlet right ventricle” or DORV). There is also a ventricular septal defect located immediately below the pulmonary artery, termed subpulmonary VSD.

In brief, in a normal oxygenation cycle, deoxygenated blood from the body enters the right heart, which then travels through the pulmonary artery to the lungs. The blood is oxygenated by the lungs, then returns to the left side of the heart. This freshly oxygenated blood can then be pumped to the rest of the body through the aorta. The body then uses up the oxygen in the blood. The cycle starts again when the deoxygenated blood enters the right heart. In short, oxygenated blood is sent to the body to be used up by the tissues and deoxygenated blood is sent to the lungs to be oxygenated, operating in one circulatory loop.

Blood flow in a heart with Taussig-Bing syndrome. PA=pulmonary artery, Ao=aorta. (a) deoxygenated blood enters the body, causing cyanosis. (b) blood that is already oxygenated reenters the lungs. (c) there is a ventricular septal defect - note the pulmonary artery/pulmonary valve is located immediately above the defect "subpulmonary VSD", therefore oxygenated blood can enter the PA back into the lungs. (d) deoxygenated blood from the right side can enter either the Ao or the PA, preferentially the Ao. (f) note the aberrant positioning of the Ao and PA compared to normal anatomy - Ao is more on the right side and PA is more on the left side, and they both connect to the right ventricle.

In contrast, in TBS, this cycle is disrupted. Deoxygenated blood from the body enters the right heart as normal. However, both the pulmonary artery and aorta are connected to the right heart, so deoxygenated blood can either flow into the pulmonary artery to the lungs (normal) or into the aorta and back to the body (abnormal). In addition, the blood in the left heart with oxygenated blood cannot enter the aorta to be distributed to the rest of the body, and instead preferentially sends blood that is already oxygenated through the pulmonary artery back to the lungs (since there is a subpulmonary VSD). In short, the normal cardiac cycle is disrupted, and deoxygenated blood is sent back to the body (causing cyanosis) and blood that is already oxygenated is sent back to the lungs. There are two separate circulatory loops working in parallel rather than one interconnected loop.

Blood flow in a heart with D-transposition of the great arteries. PA=pulmonary artery, Ao=aorta. Note the similarities in blood flow and anatomy compared to TBS. Though not pictured here, TGA can also have a VSD.

Sometimes TBS is referred to as having "transposition physiology" because the parallel circulatory loops noted above can mimic dextro-transposition of the great arteries, another more common cyanotic heart defect noted here in the third figure. The two diagnoses are differentiated by how much the pulmonary valve (the opening of the pulmonary artery) sits in the right versus left ventricle of the heart. If greater than 50 percent of the pulmonic valve is located in the right ventricle, then it is classified as Taussig-Bing syndrome. If greater than 50 percent of the pulmonic valve is located in the left ventricle, it is classified as TGA.

It is also noted that many of those diagnosed with TBS also have coarctation of the aorta (about 50%). This is another cardiac anomaly which narrows the opening of the aorta and can lessen flow of blood from the heart to the body.

== Presentation ==
Taussig-Bing syndrome is considered a cyanotic heart defect, meaning that babies born with this syndrome initially present with persistently blue skin from low oxygen content of the circulating blood.

Symptoms can vary depending on size of the VSD and the presence of other heart defects, such as coarctation of the aorta. Further description of symptoms of TBS are limited in the literature.

== Diagnosis ==
The defect is often detected before birth on routine fetal anatomy ultrasound. Even if the defect is missed on prenatal ultrasound, infants are diagnosed shortly after birth given they present with persistent cyanosis and require further workup.

After birth, it can be diagnosed by cross-sectional echocardiography (ultrasound of the heart), though CT or MRI imaging is also used for detailed images of anatomy for surgical planning.

== Management ==
It is often treated with open heart surgery within the first few weeks of life with arterial switch procedure as well as with VSD repair. In the arterial switch procedure, the aorta and the pulmonary artery are cut and effectively "switch" positions by reattaching them to the pulmonary artery root and aortic root, respectively, and ventricular defects are repaired. If coarctation of the aorta or other cardiac defects are also present, these are repaired at the same time.

Blood flow in a heart with Taussig-Bing syndrome and a patent ductus arteriosus. PA=pulmonary artery, Ao=aorta. (a) notice the availability of oxygenated blood made by the ductus from the PA to the Ao and thus the rest of the body, as compared to above diagram of TBS without a patent ductus.

Because TBS is a cyanotic heart defect, those born with TBS have very low oxygen content of the blood, which needs to be treated in the weeks/months before the infant has corrective surgery. Infants are thus administered prostaglandin E1, which functions to improve oxygenation by keeping the ductus arteriosus open. The ductus arteriosus is a vessel that typically closes shortly after birth, and in utero, allows for mixing of oxygenated and deoxygenated blood in the pulmonary artery and aorta. Maintaining its patency with prostaglandins after birth allows mixing of oxygenated blood as noted in the image here.

In times when administration of prostaglandins do not sufficiently increase oxygen saturation, a procedure called a "balloon atrial septostomy" is performed (not pictured). This creates a hole in the atrial septum (which normally separates the top chambers of the heart) to allow for further mixing of oxygenated and deoxygenated blood between the left and right sides of the heart.

== Outcomes ==
Long-term prognosis and life expectancy are good for those that undergo surgery, though some of those with TBS require further procedures later in life.

There is limited data to confidently suggest outcomes or life expectancy for those that do not undergo surgical correction.

== History ==
In 1949, Dr. Helen Taussig and Dr. Robert Bing published a case report describing a patient with transposition of the aorta, a pulmonary artery located mostly in the right ventricle, and a VSD. In this report, a 5-year-old female patient is described to have persistent cyanosis since birth, very high hemoglobin levels, and very low blood oxygen content. It was assumed the child had a heart defect, thus a cardiac catheterization was performed to visualize the heart. Unfortunately, the patient did not survive the procedure, and an autopsy was performed which identified the first description of this anomaly.

The name "Taussig-Bing" is thought to be coined later by Dr. Maurice Lev in another case report published in 1950.
