= Herta Freitag =

Austrian-American mathematician

- Born: Herta Taussig; December 6, 1908; Vienna, Austria-Hungary
- Died: January 25, 2000 (aged 91); Roanoke, Virginia, U.S.
- Relatives: Walter Taussig (brother)
- Awards: President, Mathematical Association of America

Academic background
- Education: University of Vienna, Columbia University

Academic work
- Discipline: mathematician
- Sub-discipline: Fibonacci numbers
- Institutions: Hollins College

Herta Freitag (née Taussig; December 6, 1908 – January 25, 2000) was an Austrian-American mathematician, a professor of mathematics at Hollins College, known for her work on the Fibonacci numbers.

== Life ==
She was born as Herta Taussig in Vienna, earning a master's degree from the University of Vienna in 1934. She took a teaching position at the university. However, her father (the editor of Die Neue Freie Presse) had publicly opposed the Nazis. Herta and her parents decided to move to a summer cottage in the mountains outside Vienna, to give themselves some time to make plans for the future. Herta's brother, Walter Taussig, a musician, was touring the United States and decided to remain in the U.S. (Walter later became an assistant conductor for the Metropolitan Opera Company.) Herta and her parents immediately started to work on finding a sponsor to bring them to the United States. However, even when they identified a possible sponsor, they had to wait until their quota number was called up.

In 1938, she and her parents emigrated to England. She took a job as a maid as British immigration laws prevented her from entering the country as a teacher. In 1944, she, her brother, and her mother moved to the United States. (Her father had died a year earlier in England). She began teaching mathematics again at the Greer School in Dutchess County, New York.

She earned a second master's degree in 1948 from Columbia University, and a doctorate from Columbia in 1953. Meanwhile, in 1948, she had joined the faculty at Hollins, where she eventually became a full professor and department chair. In 1962 she served as a section president for the Mathematical Association of America, the first woman in her section to do so. She retired in 1971, but returned to teaching again in 1979 after the death of her husband, Arthur Freitag, whom she had married in 1950.

== Recognition ==
Freitag was named a Fellow of the American Association for the Advancement of Science in 1959.

After her retirement, she became a frequent contributor to the Fibonacci Quarterly, and the journal honored her in 1996 by dedicating an issue to her on the occasion of her 89th birthday (89 being a Fibonacci number).
