= Joseph K. Taussig Jr. =

US Navy officer (1920–1999)

Joseph Knefler Taussig Jr
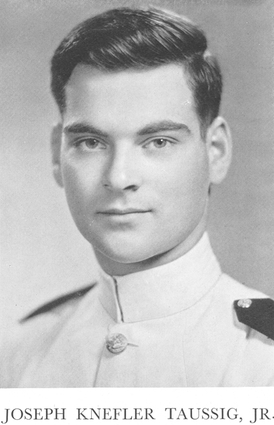
- Official photograph of Taussig as a junior officer
- Born: May 28, 1920; Newport, Rhode Island, US
- Died: December 14, 1999 (aged 79); Annapolis, Maryland, US
- Relatives: Vice Admiral Joseph Taussig (father); Rear Admiral Edward David Taussig (grandfather)
- Military career
- Allegiance: United States
- Branch: United States Navy
- Service years: 1941–1954
- Rank: Captain
- Conflicts: World War II: Attack on Pearl Harbor (WIA)
- Awards: Navy Cross, Purple Heart

Joseph Knefler Taussig Jr. (May 28, 1920 – December 14, 1999) was a United States Navy officer during and after World War II, and a Navy civilian official in the 1980s. He was the great-grandson of Brigadier General Frederick Knefler, grandson of Rear Admiral Edward David Taussig, son of Vice Admiral Joseph Taussig, and son-in-law of Admiral Robert Carney. He was also the brother-in-law of Commander George Philip, namesake of USS George Philip.

== Early life and education ==
Taussig was born in Newport, Rhode Island, on May 28, 1920. After attending high school in Washington D.C., Taussig entered the United States Naval Academy and graduated on February 7, 1941. He then was assigned to USS Nevada (BB-36).

== Pearl Harbor attack ==
Taussig was the officer of the deck of USS Nevada and senior officer in charge of her anti-aircraft batteries during the Attack on Pearl Harbor on December 7, 1941. Before the attack began, Taussig had earlier that morning ordered a second boiler lit off, planning to switch the power load from one boiler to the other around 0800. This allowed the Nevada to quickly get underway once the attack began. Taussig was severely wounded but refused to leave his station until the crew forcibly carried him away. He ended up having his leg amputated, then returned to duty three days later. He received the Navy Cross for his actions that day.

When he retired from active duty in 1954, at age 34, he was the youngest captain in the Navy.

== Civilian service ==
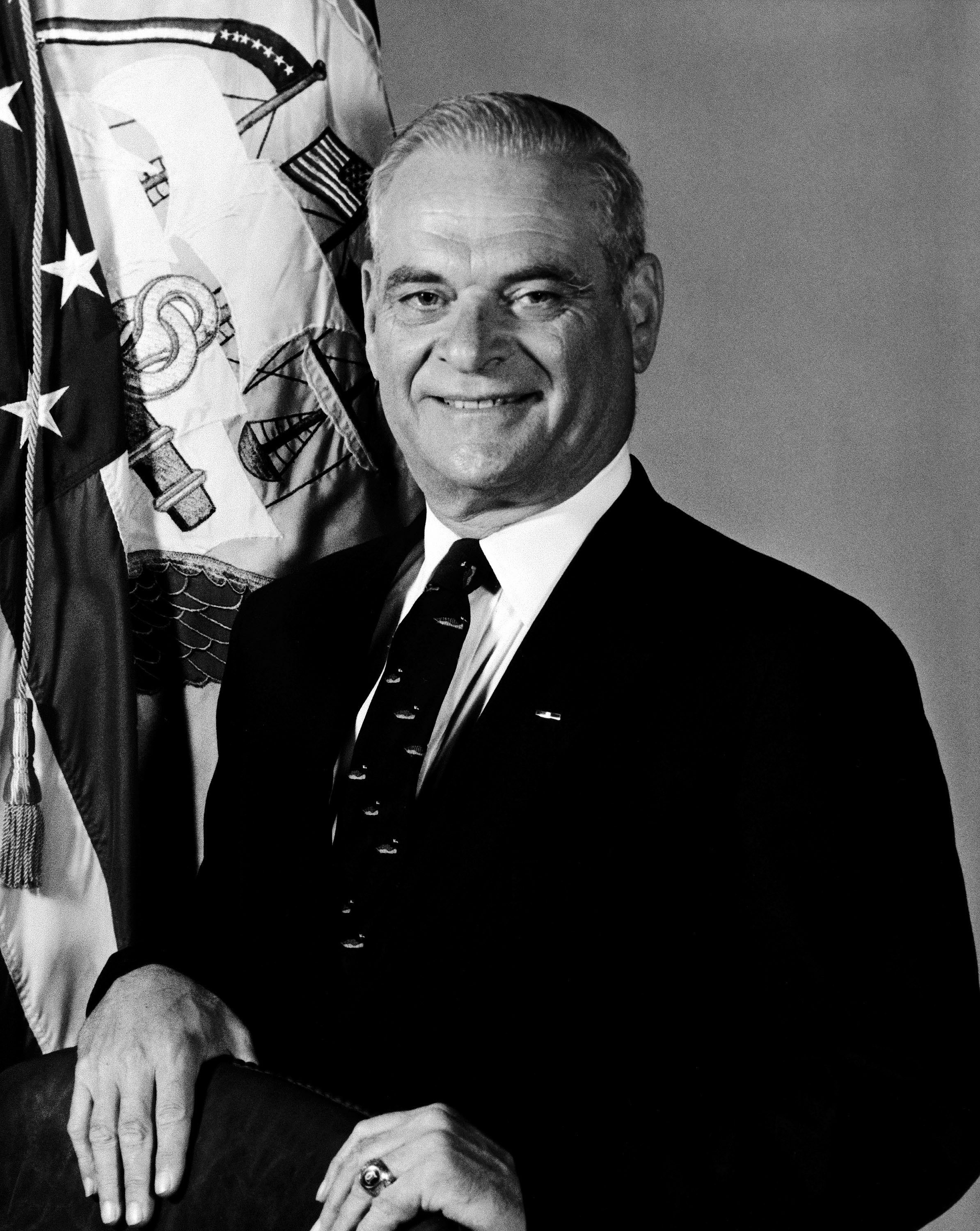
Taussig as civilian Defense Department employee in 1983

In 1981 he returned to Navy service as a civilian. Taussig was "the [U.S.] Navy's first designated high-level safety specialist" and self-styled "safety czar", appointed as a civilian special assistant to the Secretary of the Navy in 1985. He twice received the Navy Distinguished Public Service Award.

== Personal life ==
Taussig married Betty Bostwick Carney, daughter of Rear Admiral Robert Bostwick Carney (future Chief of Naval Operations), in 1943 and they had two children. He died from an embolism at Anne Arundel Medical Center, on December 14, 1999, aged 79. Betty Carney Taussig established the Joseph K. Taussig Jr. Award at the United States Naval Academy in 2001, in memory of her husband. She died at the age of 94 on April 27, 2015. Taussig and his wife are buried at the United States Naval Academy Cemetery.

== Navy Cross citation ==

The President of the United States of America takes pleasure in presenting the Navy Cross to Ensign Joseph Knefler Taussig, Jr., United States Navy, for exceptional courage, presence of mind, and devotion to duty and disregard for his personal safety while serving on board the Battleship U.S.S. NEVADA (BB-36), during the Japanese attack on the United States Pacific Fleet in Pearl Harbor, Territory of Hawaii, on 7 December 1941. As senior officer present in the anti-aircraft battery of the U.S.S. NEVADA, although seriously wounded, Ensign Taussig refused to leave his battle station and insisted on continuing the control of his battery's fire until he was forcefully taken from his station and lowered in a stretcher, other means of descent being blocked by fire. The conduct of Ensign Taussig throughout this action reflects great credit upon himself, and was in keeping with the highest traditions of the United States Naval Service.

== Namesake ==
The Executive Suite at the United States Naval Institute headquarters in Annapolis is named in his honor.
