= Francisco Martínez Portusach =

Spanish merchant and whaler who was briefly the Governor of Guam

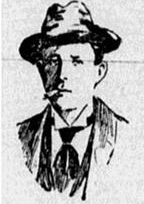

Governor of Guam
- In office June 22, 1898 – December 12, 1898
- Preceded by: Henry Glass
- Succeeded by: José Sisto

Personal details
- Born: 1864
- Died: 1919 (aged 54–55)

Francisco Martínez Portusach (1864–1919) was a Spanish merchant and whaler who was briefly the Governor of Guam and the first American governor, before he was deposed. In the American media of the time, he was often referred to as Francisco Portusach or Frank Portusach.

== Biography ==
Portusach was born in Barcelona, Spain. His father was a wealthy merchant and Portusach spent his childhood on Spanish merchant ships in the Philippines and other Spanish territories. After the death of his father, he fell out of favor with his elder brother and moved to Chicago, Illinois, in 1885 and became a United States citizen in 1888. Soon after, he moved to Tacoma, Washington, and then to San Francisco, California, where he met and married his American wife. Together, they moved to Guam, then a Spanish colonial territory.

On June 20, 1898, during the Spanish–American War, the United States captured Guam. The existing Spanish garrison, including Governor Juan Marina, were taken as prisoners of war to Manila. The existing Spanish citizens of the island were also disarmed. Captain Henry Glass, the commander of the battle appointed Portusach as the acting-Governor of Guam, to serve until a formal military garrison could be sent. Portusach's only qualification for the position was that he was the only American citizen living on the island.

With Glass and the United States Navy departed, Portusach was unable to solidify his position as governor and he was quickly overthrown by José Sisto, a Filipino Spaniard and the island Treasurer under Spanish rule. Sisto, too, would shortly be overthrown by the native Chamorro population. In January 1899, the USS Brutus arrived and reinstated Sisto – not Portusach – as governor.

In 1917, he wrote History of the Capture of Guam by the United States Man-of-War 'Charleston' and Its Transports.

== See also ==
- List of minority governors and lieutenant governors in the United States

Preceded by Henry Glass; Commissioner	Governor of Guam; 1898	Succeeded by José Sisto
