= USS Taussig =

Allen M. Sumner-class destroyer

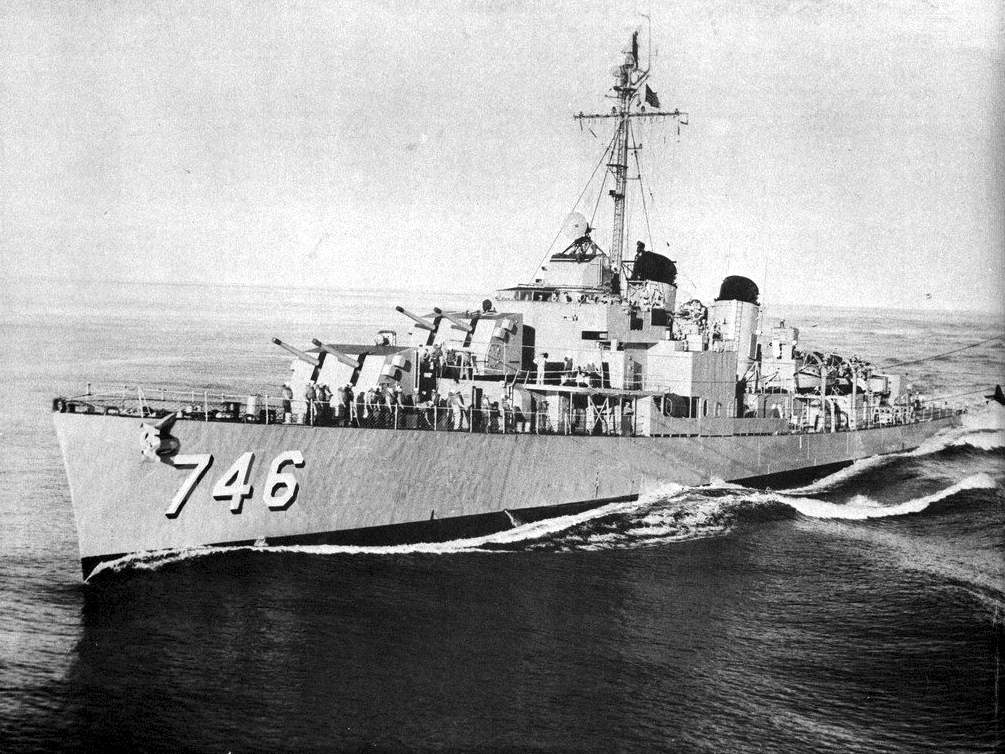
- USS Taussig underway in 1954

History

United States
- Name: Taussig
- Namesake: Edward David Taussig
- Builder: Bethlehem Mariners Harbor
- Laid down: 30 August 1943
- Launched: 25 January 1944
- Sponsored by: Mrs. Ellen M. Taussig
- Commissioned: 20 May 1944
- Decommissioned: 1 December 1970
- Stricken: 1 February 1974
- Identification: Callsign: NHIG; Hull number: DD-746
- Fate: Transferred to Taiwan, 6 May 1974
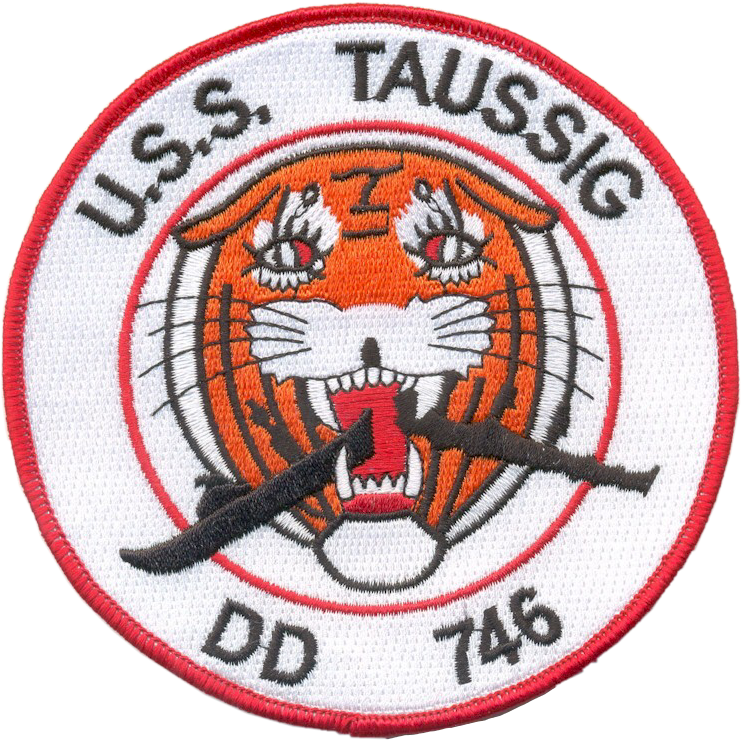
- Badge

Taiwan
- Name: Lo Yang; (洛陽)
- Namesake: Lo Yang
- Acquired: 6 May 1974
- Commissioned: 26 May 1975
- Reclassified: DD-914, 1970; DDG-914, 1979
- Identification: Hull number: DD-14
- Decommissioned: 15 February 2000
- Fate: Scrapped, 2013

General characteristics
- Class & type: Allen M. Sumner-class destroyer
- Displacement: 2,200 tons
- Length: 376 ft 6 in (114.76 m)
- Beam: 40 ft 10 in (12.45 m)
- Draft: 15 ft 8 in (4.78 m)
- Propulsion: 60,000 shp (45,000 kW); 2 propellers
- Speed: 34 knots (63 km/h; 39 mph)
- Range: 6,500 nmi (12,000 km; 7,500 mi) at 15 knots (28 km/h; 17 mph)
- Complement: 336
- Armament: 6 × 5 in.(127 mm)/38 DP guns, 12 × 40 mm AA guns, 11 × 20 mm AA guns, 10 × 21 in.(53 cm) torpedo tubes, 6 × depth charge projectors, 2 × depth charge tracks

USS Taussig (DD-746) was an American Allen M. Sumner-class destroyer. It was named for Edward D. Taussig, a rear admiral of the United States Navy whose career spanned over 50 years. Adm. Taussig is remembered for claiming Wake Island for the United States on 17 January 1899 while commanding the gunboat Bennington and for accepting the physical relinquishment of Guam from Spain, ending 300 years of Spanish colonial rule.

== Construction and career ==
The ship was laid down on 30 August 1943 at Staten Island, New York, by the Bethlehem Shipbuilding & Drydock Co.; launched on 25 January 1944; sponsored by Miss Ellen M. Taussig, Adm. Taussig's granddaughter; and commissioned at the New York Navy Yard on 20 May 1944.

=== Service in the United States Navy ===
Taussig fitted out at the New York Navy Yard and conducted a five-week shakedown cruise near Bermuda before returning to New York on 13 July for post-shakedown availability. Repairs complete, she got underway on 18 August for more training — this time at Casco Bay, Maine. On 25 August, Taussig headed south from Boston and, on 1 September, transited the Panama Canal. From there, she headed north for a one-day stop at San Diego before continuing west to Pearl Harbor. After six days of training in Hawaiian waters, the warship cleared Pearl Harbor on 28 September in company with Destroyer Squadron 61 (DesRon 61) bound, via Eniwetok, for Ulithi. She entered the lagoon at Ulithi on 19 October and reported for duty with the 3rd Fleet.

==== World War II ====
Upon joining the 3rd Fleet, Taussig went to work with Task Force 38 (TF 38). For the remainder of October, the destroyer searched the area just off the Philippines for pilots downed in sweeps of the archipelago during the Leyte invasion. Early in November, she joined the screen of TF 38 itself while its planes continued to support the Leyte operation with covering strikes up and down the Philippine chain. Along with more of the same duty, December brought an added danger — frightful weather. In late 1944, Typhoon Cobra sank three American destroyers. The December sweeps, made in preparation for the invasion of Luzon at Lingayen Gulf, continued into the first week of January 1945. On 8 January, the fast carriers began their aerial assault on the shores surrounding the South China Sea. Taussig screened the flattops while their planes attacked Japanese bases along the Chinese and Indochinese coasts and on the islands of Formosa and Okinawa as well as providing support for the Allied conquest of Luzon. During the night of 20 January, the destroyer helped shepherd TF 38 through the Balintang Channel, in the northern Philippines between Batan and Babuyan Islands, and into the Philippine Sea.

On 23 January, TF 38 returned to Ulithi for a brief rest and replenishment. At midnight three days later, it became TF 58 once again when Admiral Raymond Spruance relieved Admiral William F. Halsey as commander of the Central Pacific Force. The fast carrier task force sortied from the lagoon on 10 February, and Taussig screened Task Group 58.1 (TG 58.1) as it headed north to participate in the first carrier-based aerial attack on the Japanese home islands since the Doolittle Raid of April 1942. On the morning of the 16th, TF 58 arrived at a point some 125 miles (230 km) southeast of Tokyo. While Taussig and her sister destroyers screened them from enemy submarines, the carriers hurled their planes against Tokyo and other targets on Honshū. After another strike on the morning of the 17th, TF 58 steamed south to support the Iwo Jima invasion. While two of TF 58's task groups moved in to support the Iwo Jima assault on 19 February, Taussig stood off to the south to screen a refueling rendezvous between TG 30.8 and the three remaining carrier task groups. That same day, the destroyer subjected a submarine contact to an intensive depth-charge attack. Though she apparently failed to sink the boat, Taussig succeeded in her primary mission, protecting the carriers.Task Force 58 cleared the Volcano Islands on 22 February to resume the air offensive against the heart of the Japanese Empire. Bad weather precluded the carrying out of operations against Tokyo and Nagoya which had been planned for the 25th and 26th, respectively, and Taussig steamed southwest to strike Okinawa on 1 March. The following day, Taussig joined Vincennes, Miami, San Diego and Destroyer Squadron 61 in a bombardment of Okino Daito Shima. Two days later, the task force returned to Ulithi.

On 14 March, Taussig exited Ulithi lagoon to accompany the fast carriers on another raid against Japan. This time the target was Kyūshū, the southernmost of the major islands which constitute Japan proper. With the invasion of Okinawa just over a fortnight away, the carriers sought to pulverize airfields from which kamikaze attacks could be launched against the invasion force. During the raids of 18 and 19 March, American planes also attacked Japanese warships at Kure and succeeded in damaging the carriers Ryūhō and Amagi as well as the battleship Yamato. Taussig helped shoot down two aircraft on the 18th and the next day screened TF 58 as it retired from the vicinity of Kyūshū after a devastating kamikaze attack. She defended her big sisters during the sporadic air attacks of the 20th and, after the task force reorganization of the 22d, she moved off to screen TG 58.1 during the week-long aerial assault inflicted upon Okinawa at the end of March.

On 1 April, the troops stormed ashore at Okinawa to begin the concluding operation of World War II. TF 58 provided air support through the first three months of the campaign, and Taussig moved about off Okinawa screening the carrier from Japanese submarines and planes. The entire campaign was characterized by intense enemy air activity, particularly by kamikazes. On 6 April, a Nakajima Ki-43 "Oscar" dropped a bomb which barely missed Taussig. The destroyer responded with her antiaircraft battery and scored hits on the intruder, but TF 58's combat air patrol finally claimed the tally. On the night of 15 and 16 April, Taussig gunners brought down two bombers and, the following day, claimed credit for downing two suicide planes as well as for assisting in the destruction of a Yokosuka P1Y "Frances" finished off by a combat air patrol. On 21 April, she teamed up with San Juan and DesRon 61 to subject Minami Daito Shima to their guns.

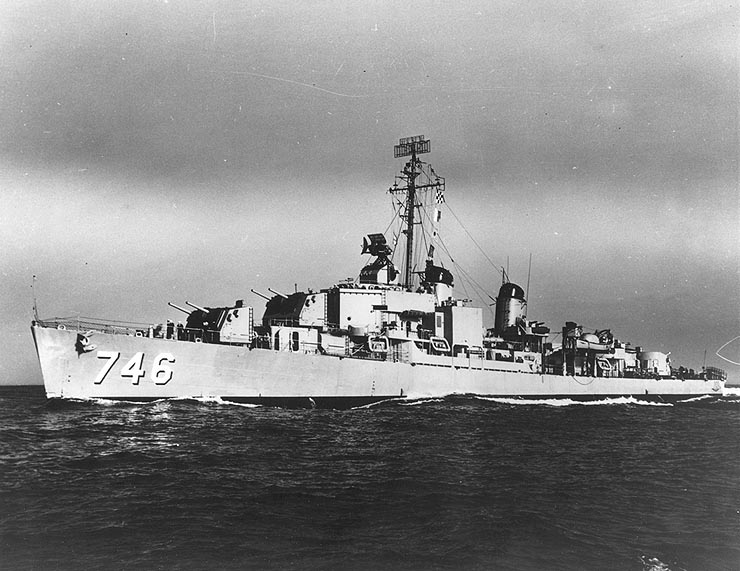
Taussig underway during the late 1940s or early 1950s

At the end of April, Taussig returned to Ulithi with TG 58.1 and remained there through the first week in May. On the 8th, she cleared the lagoon to take up station off Okinawa once more. She screened TG 58.1 carriers while their planes supported the ground forces on Okinawa. Taussig continued to guard against the enemy's submarines, but his planes remained the most immediate threat. On 25 May, the destroyer helped to bring down three more Japanese aircraft when her radio controllers vectored combat air patrols in to the kill. Three days later, Admiral Halsey relieved Admiral Spruance, and the 5th Fleet again became the 3d Fleet. Taussig remained with the same task group, which simply changed designation to TG 38.1. Through the first week in June, she continued to protect those carriers off Okinawa while they sent their planes against the beleaguered island's stubborn defenders and against air bases on Kyūshū. She then headed south with TF 38 and arrived at the Leyte Gulf base on 13 June to prepare for the expected invasion of the Japanese home islands.

On 1 July, Taussig put to sea with TF 38 for the last series of offensive operations in World War II. For the next month and one-half, she cruised off Japan screening the carriers while their planes softened Japan for the expected invasion. Her guns spoke several times during those operations. On the night of 22 and 23 July, she made an antishipping sweep off Honshū with DesRon 61. The destroyers encountered a four-ship Japanese convoy, engaged it with guns and torpedoes, and claimed to have sunk all four enemy ships. Air operations and antishipping sweeps continued until 15 August 1945 when news of Japan's willingness to capitulate brought an end to hostilities.

Taussig remained in the Far East until shortly after the formal surrender ceremony in Tokyo Bay on 2 September. In October, she returned to the United States and began repairs at Seattle. The destroyer remained there until 1 February 1946, when she sailed for a year of duty off the Chinese coast. In March 1947, Taussig returned to the west coast at San Diego, California Upon her return to the United States, she became a school ship for the General Line School at Monterey. For the next three years, the destroyer conducted cruises along the west coast familiarizing officers assigned to the school with operations at sea. In addition, she was frequently called upon to take Naval Reservists on board for training cruises.

==== Korean War ====
In 1950, her training duties ended. On 1 May, Taussig departed San Diego, bound for the western Pacific. En route, she stopped in Hawaii for a few days training and for liberty in the islands. By 1 June, though, she was again underway for Samar in the Philippines.

Just 24 days later, war erupted in the Far East when North Korean troops streamed south across the 38th parallel into the Republic of Korea. Less than 48 hours later, Taussig — assigned to DesDiv 92, 7th Fleet — resumed familiar duty in the Sea of Japan screening TF 77 carriers while their planes joined South Korean ground forces in an attempt to stem the communist tide. That duty continued until the second week in July when Taussig made visits to Buckner Bay, Okinawa, and to Keelung, Taiwan, before returning to the war zone on the 11th. Over the following six months, the destroyer operated off both coasts of Korea, usually as a unit of the task group built around Sicily and Badoeng Strait. She spent the bulk of that time at sea and participated in the operations at Inchon, Pohang, and Wonsan. In late December, Taussig also assisted in the evacuation of Wonsan.

Early in 1951, she returned to the west coast, underwent a three-month overhaul at the San Francisco Naval Shipyard, and conducted extensive underway training out of San Diego in preparation for her return to the war zone. On 27 August, Taussig headed back toward the western Pacific. After stops at Pearl Harbor, Midway, and Japan, she joined the United Nations Blockading and Escort Force, TF 95, off Korea on 20 September. During ensuing operations with that force until 2 October, the destroyer visited Pusan and conducted shore bombardments near the Han River and near Songjin. From 2 October to 2 November, she screened the carriers of TF 77. Between 3 and 23 November, Taussig participated in hunter-killer operations with units of the ROK Navy before heading south for a month with the Taiwan Strait Patrol. She spent Christmas in Sasebo and then rejoined TF 95 on 26 December for more than a month of operations, primarily shore bombardment and night illumination fire along Korea's western coast. Following rest and relaxation in Yokosuka, Taussig began her last tour of combat duty of the deployment on 7 February 1952. For the remainder of this assignment, she screened TF 77 while the carriers conducted air operations. On 24 April, the destroyer completed her second Korean War deployment in the Orient and headed back to the United States.

Taussig returned to San Diego on 11 May and, after a month of leave and upkeep, began training operations which continued until 1 October when she entered the Mare Island Naval Shipyard for repairs. In mid-November, she returned to San Diego and, on the 20th, headed west for her third Korean War deployment. She reached Yokosuka on 22 December and, on the day after Christmas, put to sea to join the screen of TF 77. During the following six months, she alternated screening and plane guard duty for the carriers with bombardment and patrol duty with the Escort and Blockading Force as well as hunter-killer group duty and Taiwan Strait patrols.

==== Post Korean War ====
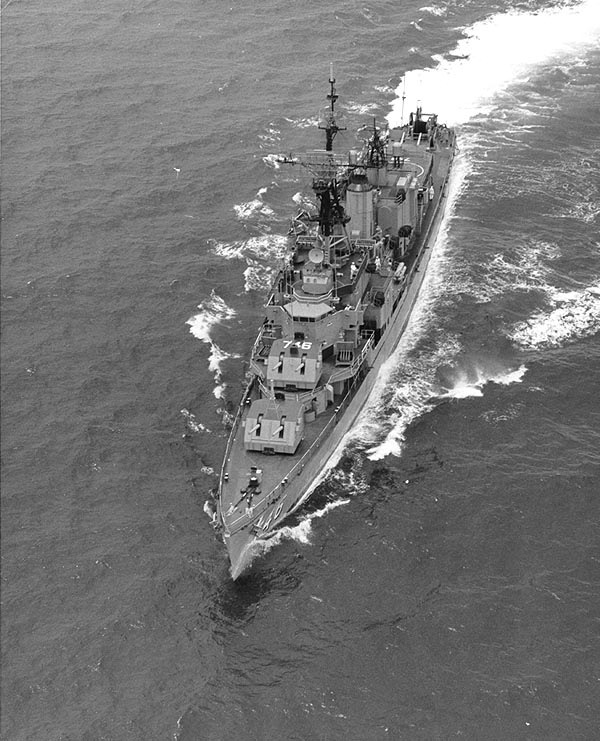
Taussig underway off Oahu, 10 May 1963

On Independence Day 1953, she headed home. By the time of the destroyer's departure from the Far East in the summer of 1953, the Korean War had wound down almost to inactivity. Over the next decade, Taussig made eight more deployments to the western Pacific. Though she continued to operate with the Korean War task organizations, her duty was increasingly modified to peacetime training and "show-the-flag" duty. Between the seventh and eight deployments, she entered the Long Beach Naval Shipyard on 22 January 1962 to begin a nine-month Fleet Rehabilitation and Modernization (FRAM) overhaul, which she completed on 11 October. Her eighth peacetime deployment to the Far East was from April to December 1963. Upon her return, the warship conducted operations off the west coast until October 1964.

==== Vietnam War ====
On 23 October 1964, Taussig cleared San Diego harbor for another deployment to the western Pacific. She operated in the Hawaiian Islands until Christmas and then continued on to the western Pacific. On 6 January 1965, the destroyer joined a task unit built around Constellation off the coast of Japan to begin duty with the 7th Fleet. During this deployment, the warship saw her first tour of duty off the coast of Vietnam, where civil strife was growing steadily in intensity. Soon the United States would be deeply committed to bolstering the democratic forces in that Southeast Asian country against communist aggression. For the time being, however, Taussig's one short patrol at "Yankee Station" in March constituted her only Vietnam service during her ninth deployment since the Korean War. For the remainder of that deployment, she conducted normal peacetime training and patrol operations, including a tour in the Taiwan Strait Patrol. The destroyer departed the Orient on 2 May and, after a stop at Pearl Harbor, reached San Diego on 24 May. On 24 July, she entered the Long Beach Naval Shipyard to begin regular overhaul which she completed on 8 November. After a month of independent ship's exercises and holiday standdown, she commenced refresher training on 3 January 1966. On 12 February, the ship entered the Long Beach Naval Shipyard for three weeks of sonar repairs.

Following further exercises and shore bombardment qualifications, the destroyer got underway from San Diego on 20 April to return to the Far East to provide naval support for the burgeoning American presence in the Republic of Vietnam. She stopped at Pearl Harbor from 26 to 28 April and then continued on her way — via Guam and the Philippines — to duty off Vietnam. She departed Subic Bay on 26 May for her first real line period of the Vietnam War. On the 27th, she was ordered to assist in a search and rescue (SAR) mission for flyers downed by Typhoon Judy. On 1 June, she took up station off the coast of Vietnam to provide naval gunfire support for operations ashore. From then until early October, Taussig alternated naval gunfire support with plane guard duty for Constellation on the southern SAR station off Vietnam.

After 10 days in Subic Bay as naval gunfire support ready ship, the warship headed south on 9 October to participate in Operation "Swordhilt." She refueled at Manus on 15 October and, on the 16th, joined ships of the Australian, New Zealand, and British navies for the 11-day exercise in which antisubmarine warfare and air defense were emphasized. Following Operation "Sword-hilt", she visited Australia. On 4 November, Commander, 7th Fleet, cut short her stay at Melbourne by ordering Taussig to assist Tiru which had run aground on Frederick Reef some 300 miles northeast of Australia. She escorted the damaged submarine into Brisbane on the 7th and sailed two days later for the United States. She stopped at Suva, Fiji, along the way and entered San Diego on the 25th.

Taussig spent the following year engaged in operations out of San Diego. She conducted ASW training operations during the first two weeks of January and underwent hull repairs at Long Beach for the rest of the month. Early in February, she conducted ASW exercises with Lofberg, Chevalier, Scamp, and Pomfret, and then entered San Diego for a tender availability from 11 to 24 February. In March, the destroyer visited Acapulco, Mexico, and returned to San Diego on the 23d. On the last day of the month, she moved to Long Beach, where she began additional hull repairs on 1 April. Those repairs were completed exactly a month later, and she returned to San Diego on 4 May. In June and July, she embarked NROTC midshipmen for their summer cruise, conducted gunnery drills at San Clemente Island, and resumed antisubmarine warfare (ASW) training with Lofberg, Chevalier, Frank Knox, and Raton. She disembarked the midshipmen on 3 August and returned to San Clemente for naval gunfire support exercises with Marine Corps spotters. For the remainder of the year, she participated in various drills and exercises — primarily in ASW — along the West Coast.

Early in December, she put into San Diego to make final preparations for her next deployment. On 28 December, Taussig departed San Diego in company with ASW Group 1 bound, via Hawaii, for the western Pacific. She reached Pearl Harbor on 6 January 1968 and, after a week of ASW exercises and another of rest and relaxation, got underway for Yokosuka, Japan. The destroyer never reached that port. On 23 January, units of the North Korean Navy seized the electronic reconnaissance ship Pueblo, and ASW Group 1 was diverted to the Sea of Japan. Taussig and her colleagues arrived in their patrol area on 29 January, and as part of Operation Formation Star, Taussig remained on patrol station for 45 days.

Taussig departed the Sea of Japan on 1 March and put into Subic Bay for upkeep three days later. The destroyer left the Philippines on the 12th to take up naval gunfire support station off Vietnam. On 14 March, she relieved Cone off the coast of the U.S. III Corps area of South Vietnam. That evening, she fired her first round of the deployment in support of Allied forces ashore. Prichett relieved her on 1 April, and Taussig arrived in Kaohsiung on the 4th for a tender availability. Eleven days later, the warship put to sea to return to Vietnamese waters. On the 15th, she joined the screen of Bon Homme Richard in the Gulf of Tonkin. After five days serving as plane guard for the carrier, Taussig parted company with the task unit and proceeded to the III Corps area of South Vietnam for three days of gunfire support duty. The destroyer rejoined ASW Group 1 on the 23d and, after a five-day visit to Hong Kong, conducted ASW exercises near the Philippines en route to "Yankee Station" in the Gulf of Tonkin, where she spent most of May plane-guarding Yorktown and Kitty Hawk. On the 26th, Taussig headed for Port Swettenham, Malaysia, where she arrived on the 29th. The destroyer put to sea again on 2 June and, by the 5th, was back on station in the Gulf of Tonkin.

After 12 days of plane guard duty, she pointed her bow toward Sasebo for the first leg of her journey home. On 21 June, Taussig stood out of Sasebo, formed up on Yorktown along with the rest of ASW Group 1, and headed for the California coast. On 5 July, the warship steamed into San Diego and began a six-week post-deployment standdown. She departed San Diego again on 21 August to enter the San Francisco Bay Naval Shipyard for overhaul. Her refurbishing was completed on 26 November, and Taussig departed San Francisco to return to San Diego, whence she operated for the remainder of the year.

Taussig spent the first six weeks of 1969 preparing for refresher training, which she commenced on 14 February. For the ensuing six weeks, the destroyer went through a seemingly unending series of drills, inspections, exercises, and battle problems. Finally, however, Taussig passed her final examination on 28 March and settled back into routine operations out of San Diego. She departed San Diego on 4 June, in company with Halsey, Herbert J. Thomas, Prichett, John R. Craig, and Hamner. The six destroyers refueled at Pearl Harbor and continued on to Japan, arriving at Yokosuka on the 21st.

Two days later, Taussig stood out for Vietnam, reaching Vung Tau on 28 June. From 29 June to 15 July, she provided gunfire support for the Allied ground forces fighting North Vietnamese and Viet Cong units in the U.S. IV Corps area of South Vietnam. From here, she headed for Kaohsiung, Taiwan, for a two-day liberty after which the destroyer steamed on to Japan. After a tender availability alongside Ajax at Sasebo, Taussig entered the Sea of Japan on 4 August to "ride shotgun" for Benjamin Stoddert and Halsey. On 24 August, the warship headed for Hong Kong where she arrived on the 28th.

Five days later, she departed Hong Kong and returned to the gunline, this time near the U.S. I Corps area of South Vietnam. On 3 September, Taussig supported a combined United States–Korean amphibious landing about 20 miles down the coast from Da Nang. As the only gunfire support for Operation "Defiant Stand", Taussig and her crew kept up a hectic pace until 21 September when her relief arrived, and she headed for the Philippines. She completed repairs and departed Subic Bay on 2 October in company with Hancock. She did plane guard duty for the carrier in the Gulf of Tonkin until the 11th when she headed for Yokosuka.

==== End of service ====
Taussig remained in Japan from 16 to 19 October before resuming her voyage home. Forced to turn back to Yokosuka by Typhoon Ida, she set out once more on 24 October and, after stops at Midway and Pearl Harbor, reached San Diego on 7 November. Leave and upkeep took up the remainder of 1969, and installation of two new gun mounts occupied the first three months of 1970. In April, she entered the Long Beach Naval Shipyard where she received a new sonar dome. Following that, she embarked upon a vigorous training program in preparation for her deployment to the western Pacific scheduled for July.

However, that deployment was cancelled, and Taussig was slated for inactivation. From August to December, her crew worked to prepare the destroyer for decommissioning. On 1 December 1970, Taussig was placed out of commission at San Diego and berthed with the San Diego Group, Pacific Reserve Fleet. On 1 September 1973, Taussig was struck from the Navy List. On 6 May 1974, she was sold to Taiwan.

=== Service in the Republic of China Navy ===
She was commissioned on 26 May 1975 as ROCS Lo Yang (DD-14).

Her number was changed to DD-914 in 1970.

It was changed again to DDG-914 in 1979.

She was decommissioned on 15 February 2000.

She was originally scheduled to be transferred to Keelung for display as a museum ship, and was sold and scrapped in November 2013 without the intention of the local government. The bow of the ship is currently on display at the Taipei Navy Command Headquarters.

Taussig earned six battle stars during World War II, eight battle stars during the Korean War, and six battle stars during the Vietnam War.

== Rod Steiger's World War II service on Taussig ==
As a young man, future Hollywood actor and recipient of the 1968 Academy Award for Best Actor, Rodney Stephen Steiger, served on Taussig as a "plank owner" from the time of her commissioning until 1 May 1945. Steiger advanced from seaman first class to torpedoman third class during his time on the ship. Steiger later commented: "I loved the Navy. I was stupid enough to think I was being heroic". His experiences during the war haunted him for the rest of his life, particularly the loss of Americans during the Battle of Iwo Jima, as well as the sinking of vessels by Taussig which were known to have women and children aboard. During Typhoon Cobra also known as "Halsey's Typhoon" on 17 December 1944, with winds reaching one hundred knots (115 mph) and 80 foot (24 m) waves off the coast of Luzon in the Philippines, Steiger was on deck, having secured himself with rope and flattening himself as waves engulfed the ship.
