= Second Nicaraguan Campaign Medal =

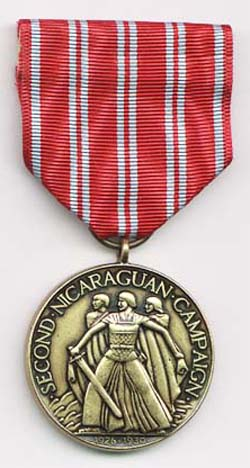
- Obverse
- Type: Campaign medal
- Awarded for: Service in Nicaragua or nearby naval operations
- Presented by: Department of the Navy
- Status: No longer awarded
- First award: Admiral William Henry Hudson Southerland
- Service ribbon and battle streamer

Precedence
- Next (higher): Haitian Campaign Medal 1919–1920
- Next (lower): Yangtze Service Medal

The Second Nicaraguan Campaign Medal is a campaign medal of the United States Navy which was authorized by an act of the United States Congress on 8 November 1929. The Second Nicaraguan Campaign Medal was awarded for service during operations in Nicaragua from 1926 to 1933, during the Nicaraguan Civil War and the subsequent occupation. An earlier campaign medal, the Nicaraguan Campaign Medal, was awarded for service in Nicaragua in 1912.

== History ==
The Second Nicaraguan Campaign Medal was created by General Order 197 of the Navy Department and approved by Congress to recognize participation by Navy and Marine Corps personnel in naval operations at Nicaragua between 27 August 1926 and 2 January 1933.

== Appearance ==
The Second Nicaraguan Campaign Medal appeared as a medal suspended from a red ribbon with several white stripes. The medal depicts a woman (representing Columbia), armed with a sword, defending two other figures with a cloak. The medal bore the words Second Nicaraguan Campaign along the top with the dates 1926 – 1930 displayed on the medal's bottom, although the medal was authorized until 1933.

== Criteria ==
To be awarded the Second Nicaraguan Campaign Medal, a service member must have either served ashore during the specified period or on a United States ship, or as an embarked Marine, in the waters or land territory of Nicaragua during the aforementioned dates.

The Second Nicaraguan Campaign Medal was considered a separate award from the first version of the medal and Navy regulations permitted the receipt and wear of both medals, if so authorized. Rear Admiral W. H. H. Southerland, who had been in overall command of both Nicaraguan campaigns, was the first recipient of both versions of the Nicaraguan Campaign Medal.

No ribbon attachments or devices were authorized.

== Eligible ships ==
The crews of the following ships were awarded the Second Nicaraguan Campaign Medal for service during the noted periods of time:

Ship	Dates	Ship	Dates
USS Asheville	5–12 August 1929; 26 December 1929; 7-9 February 1930; 31 January-3 March 1931; 13 May-17 June 1931	USS Bainbridge	26 April-4 June 1927
USS Barker	10 January 27; 13-31 January 1927	USS Barry	19–30 December 1926; 2-9 January 1927
USS Borie	9–18 January 1927; 24 January-15 March 1927	USS Brooks	18–21 December 1926
USS Cincinnati	11 Jan 1927; 14-27 January 1927	USS Coghlan	18 February-21 March 1927
USS Cleveland	12 December 1926 – 17 January 1927; 21 January-22 March 1927; 28 March-24 May 1927; 20 May-7 June 1927; 18 June 1927 – 21 July 1927; 4-24 August 1927; 16-19 September 1927; 23 September-1 October 1927; 11-14 October 1927; 28 October-20 November 1927; 24 March-24 April 1928; 29 April 1928; 15 May-14 June 1928; 11 July 1928; 23-26 July 1928; 31 July 1928 – 8 August 1928; 25 August 1928 – 22 September 1928; 4-15 October 1928; 20 October 1928; 3-8 November 1928; 19-21 May 1929; 27 June-2 August 1929	USS Denver	18 September 1926; 25 September-16 November 1926; 27 November 1926-13 January 1927; 17 January-20 March 1927; 26 March-30 May 1927; 2-29 June 1927; 15 July-13 August 1927; 24 August-6 September 1927; 29 December 1927-12 January 1928; 21-22 January 1928; 29 January-19 February 1928; 5-28 March 1928; 9 April-15 May 1928; 17 June-22 July 1928; 8-12 August 1928; 25-28 August 1928; 6-14 December 1928; 1-4 January 1929; 16-21 January 1929; 11-14 April 1929; 9 August 1929; 16 August-30 September 1929; 27-28 November 1929; 29 March-31 May 1930; 22 April-7 May 1930; 5 September-10 October 1930
USS Detroit	23 March-17 April 1927	USS John D. Edwards	9 January 1927; 17-27 January 1927; 31 January-3 February 1927; 7-13 February 1927
USS Flusser	24 April-19 May 1927; 23 May-12 June 1927	USS Galveston	27 August-1 November 1926; 13 November-7 December 1926; 10-27 December 1926; 5 January-22 February 1927; 4 March-20 April 1927; 30 Apr 27-18 Jun 27; 26 Sep 27-13 Oct 27; 6 Nov 27-20 Nov 27; 2 Dec 27-30 Dec 27; 8 Jan 28-23 Jan 28; 26 Feb 28-31 Mar 28; 4 Apr 28-11 Apr 28; 30 Apr 28; 15 May 28-18 Jun 28; 26 Sep 28-19 Oct 28; 2 Nov 28-15 Nov 28; 18 Feb 29-19 Feb 29; 18 Apr 29-19 Apr 29; 2 Jun 29-27 Jun 29; 2 Aug 29-04 Aug 29; 5 Apr 30-22 Apr 30
USS Gilmer	25 September-7 October 1926; 11-30 October 1926	USS Goff	15 January-11 February 1927
USS Hatfield	13–27 February 1927; 3-21 March 1927	USS Henderson	7–26 March 1927
USS Humphreys	21–22 November 1926	USS Reuben James	21 January-15 March 1927
USS Kane	19 March-4 April 1927; 24 April 1927	USS Kidder	13–27 June 1927
USS King	26 April-3 May 1927; 7 May-9 June 1927	USS La Vallette	13–23 June 1927
USS Lawrence	13 February-11 March 1927; 14-21 March 1927	USS Litchfield	23 June-10 July 1927; 31 July 1927
USS Marblehead	11–29 January 1927	USS Marcus	11–13 August 1927
USS McFarland	19 March-8 April 1927; 12-24 April 1927	USS Melvin	25 June-18 July 1927
USS Memphis	26 October-8 November 1932	USS Mervine	26 Jun 27; 9-20 July 1927
USS Milwaukee	29 January-8 February 1927; 11-15 February 1927; 19 February-2 May 1927; 2-4 June 1927; 9-13 June 1927	USS Mullany	30 July-13 August 1927
USS Osborne	11–16 January 1927	USS Overton	30 August-13 September 1932
USS James K. Paulding	1–13 November 1926; 16-19 November 1926; 19-29 March 1927; 3-24 April 1927	USS Philip	31 January-9 February 1932; 8-11 April 1932; 30 April 1932
USS Preston	29 April-10 May 1927; 15 May-3 June 1927; 7-13 June 1927	USS Quail	27 December 1927 – 31 January 1928; 9-12 February 1927
USS Raleigh	5 February-23 March 1927	USS Reed	24 April-22 May 1927; 26 May-12 June 1927
USS Rochester	21 January-15 March 1927; 12-25 June 1927; 16 July-9 August 1927; 31 August-6 October 1926; 15 October-9 December 1926; 22 December 1926-20 January 1927; 27 January-1 February 1927; 21-24 July 1927; 2-5 August 1927; 10-11 October 1927; 6-7 November 1927; 7 January-1 February 1928; 16 February-15 March 1928; 24 March-7 April 1928; 28-31 May 1928; 27-30 June 1928; 8-18 July 1928; 21 July-25 August 1928; 22-27 September 1928; 19 October-27 November 1928; 31 December 1928-7 January 1929; 4-11 February 1929; 13-18 July 1929; 25 November-19 December 1929; 9 October-16 November 1930; 3-14 April 1931	USS Sacramento	16–27 March 1929; 2-4 June 1929; 22-24 September 1929; 14-24 March 1930; 3-31 January 1931; 17 April-13 May 1931; 14 August-11 September 1931
USS Selfridge	18 June-17 July 1927; 23-26 July 1927	USS Shirk	2–23 July 1927
USS Sloat	25 June-9 July 1927; 22 July-8 August 27	USS Robert Smith	12–25 June 1927; 16 July-9 August 1927
USS Sturtevant	19 September-4 October 1932	USS Smith Thompson	25–30 September 1926; 3 October-1 November 1926; 11-16 January 1927
USS Tracy	22 November-18 December 1926; 15 March-26 April 1927	USS Trenton	17 April-16 May 1927
USS Tulsa	29 August-28 September 1926; 7-8 October 1926; 12-16 October 1926; 1 November-14 December 1926; 3 March-30 April 1926; 7 May-19 July 1927; 13 August-24 September 1927; 14 October-7 November 1927; 30 November-20 December 1927; 6 Jan-16 February 1928; 10 March 1928; 14 June-2 July 1928; 7-11 July 1928; 21-25 July 1928; 7-21 August 1928; 31 August-16 September 1928; 28 September-4 October 1928; 18 November-9 December 1928	USS Whipple	22 Nov 26; 5-7 December 1926; 9-19 December 1926; 15 March-27 April 1927
USS Wickes	30 January-9 February 1932	USS Williamson	15–29 January 1927; 2-18 February 1927
USS Wood	27 June-16 July 1927	USS Yarborough	12–18 June 1927; 8 July-5 August 1927
