= Nicaraguan Campaign Medal =

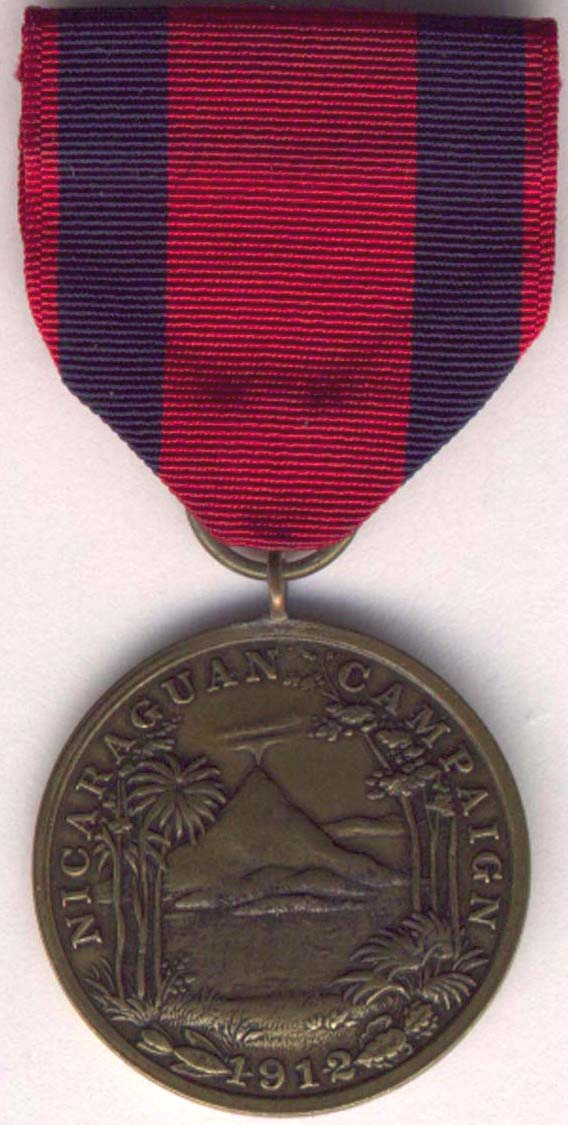
- Obverse
- Type: Campaign medal
- Awarded for: Service in Nicaragua or nearby naval operations
- Presented by: Department of the Navy
- Status: obsolete
- Service ribbon and streamer

The Nicaraguan Campaign Medal is a campaign medal of the United States Navy which was authorized by Presidential Order of Woodrow Wilson on September 22, 1913. A later medal, the Second Nicaraguan Campaign Medal was authorized by an act of the United States Congress on November 8, 1929. The two medals were considered two separate awards, with the original medal being commonly referred to as the First Nicaraguan Campaign Medal.

== First Nicaraguan Campaign Medal ==
The First Nicaraguan Campaign Medal was created to recognize those U.S. Navy personnel and U.S. Marines who had participated in amphibious actions in Nicaragua between 29 July and 14 November 1912. The following naval commands, and all embarked U.S. Marines, were eligible for the First Nicaraguan Campaign Medal:

- USS Annapolis (gunboat)
- USS California (armored cruiser)
- USS Cleveland (protected cruiser)
- USS Colorado (armored cruiser)
- USS Denver (protected cruiser)
- USS Glacier (stores ship)
- USS Maryland (armored cruiser)
- USS Tacoma (protected cruiser)

The medal for the First Nicaraguan Campaign Medal displayed a volcano, rising from a lake, with the words “Nicaraguan Campaign” and the date 1912 on the edges of the medal. The medal itself was suspended from a red ribbon with two thick blue stripes. On the reverse of each medal was a Navy or Marine Corps crest, depending on the recipient's branch of service.

The First Nicaraguan Campaign Medal was a one-time-only decoration and there were no devices or attachments authorized.
