= USS Denver (CL-16) =

Denver-class cruiser

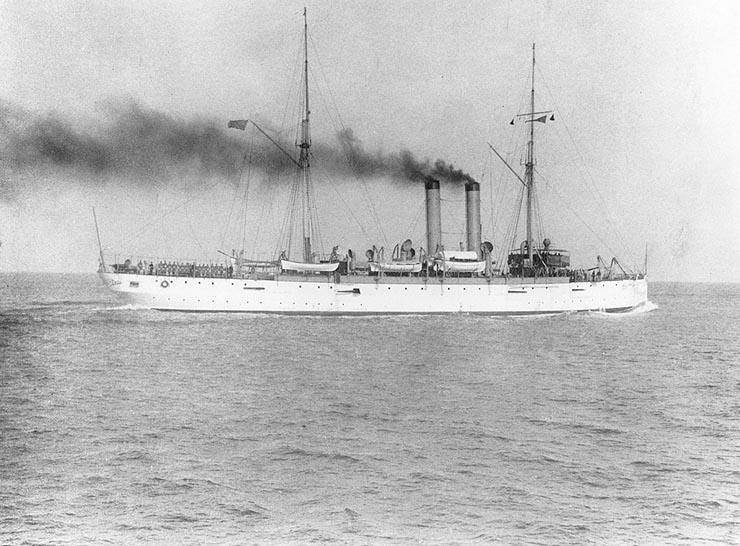
- USS Denver (C-14), during the North Atlantic fleet review, 1905

History

United States
- Name: Denver
- Namesake: City of Denver, Colorado
- Ordered: 3 March 1899
- Awarded: 14 December 1899
- Builder: Neafie and Levy Ship and Engine Building Co, Philadelphia, Pennsylvania
- Cost: $1,080,000 (contract price of hull and machinery)
- Laid down: 28 June 1900
- Launched: 21 June 1902
- Sponsored by: Miss R. W. Wright
- Commissioned: 17 May 1904
- Decommissioned: 14 February 1931
- Reclassified: PG-28, 17 July 1920; CL-16, 8 August 1921
- Stricken: 12 March 1931
- Identification: Hull symbol: C-14; Hull symbol: PG-28; Hull symbol: CL-16
- Fate: Sold, 13 September 1933

General characteristics (as built)
- Class & type: Denver-class protected cruiser
- Displacement: 3,200 long tons (3,251 t) (standard); 3,514 long tons (3,570 t) (full load)
- Length: 308 ft 9 in (94.11 m) oa; 292 ft (89 m)pp
- Beam: 44 ft (13 m)
- Draft: 15 ft 9 in (4.80 m) (mean)
- Installed power: 6 × Babcock & Wilcox boilers; 21,000 ihp (16,000 kW)
- Propulsion: 2 × vertical triple expansion reciprocating engines; 2 × screws
- Sail plan: Schooner
- Speed: 16.5 knots (30.6 km/h; 19.0 mph); 16.75 knots (31.02 km/h; 19.28 mph) (Speed on Trial)
- Complement: 31 officers 261 enlisted men
- Armament: 10 × 5 in (127 mm)/50 caliber Mark 5 Breech-loading rifles; 8 × 6-pounder (57 mm (2.2 in)) rapid fire guns; 2 × 1-pounder (37 mm (1.5 in)) guns
- Armor: Deck: 2 1/2 in (64 mm) (slope); 3/16 in (4.8 mm) (flat); Shields: 1 3/4 in (44 mm)

General characteristics (1921)
- Armament: 8 × 5 in (127 mm)/50 caliber Mark 5 breech-loading rifles; 1 × 3 in (76 mm)/50 anti-aircraft gun; 6 × 6-pounder (57 mm (2.2 in)) rapid fire guns; 2 × 1-pounder (37 mm (1.5 in)) guns

USS Denver (C-14/PG-28/CL-16) was the lead ship of her class of protected cruisers in the United States Navy. She was the first Navy ship named for the city of Denver, the capital of Colorado.

Denver was launched on 21 June 1902 by Neafie and Levy Ship and Engine Building Company in Philadelphia, sponsored by Miss R. W. Wright, daughter of Robert R. Wright, the mayor of Denver; and commissioned on 17 May 1904, with Commander Joseph Ballard Murdock in command. She was reclassified PG-28 in 1920 and CL-16 on 8 August 1921.

== Service history ==
=== Caribbean patrol ===
Between 15 July and 26 July 1904, Denver visited Galveston, Texas, where she was presented a gift of silver service from the people of Denver. She cruised in the Caribbean, investigating disturbances in Haiti, then returned to Philadelphia on 1 October. During the next two and a half years, she cruised the Atlantic Coast and in the Caribbean, joining in target practice and other exercises, and protecting American interests from political disturbance in the West Indies. On 13 September 1906, a landing force consisting of six officers and 124 bluejackets and marines, under the command of Lt. Comdr. M. L. Miller was landed from Denver at Havana, Cuba. This landing force returned on board on 14 September 1906. Crewmembers serving on Denver between 12 September and 2 October 1906 qualified for award of the Cuban Pacification Medal.

=== 1906 ceremonies ===
Non-campaign highlights of this period of her service included her participation at Annapolis between 19 April and 27 April 1906 in the interment ceremonies for John Paul Jones at the United States Naval Academy; a midshipman training cruise to Madeira and the Azores in the summer of 1906; and the Fleet Review off Oyster Bay, Long Island, by President Theodore Roosevelt in September 1906.

=== Asiatic fleet ===
The cruiser sailed from Tompkinsville, New York, on 18 May 1907 for duty with the Asiatic Fleet in the Philippines, sailing through the Mediterranean and Suez Canal to Cavite, where she arrived on 1 August. Denver visited ports in China, Manchuria, and Japan, and joined in the regular exercise schedule of the fleet until 1 January 1910, when she cleared Cavite for Mare Island Naval Shipyard. Arriving there on 15 February, she was placed out of commission on 12 March; she was then placed in reserve commission on 4 January 1912, and placed in full commission on 15 July 1912 for service in the Pacific.

=== Pacific fleet ===
On 19 July 1912, Assistant Secretary of the Navy Beekman Winthrop announced that on 30 July, Denver would depart Mare Island bound for the west coast of Mexico and its principal ports including Mazatlan and Acapulco before returning to Mare Island in what he termed "a friendly call." However, because of worsening political turmoil in Nicaragua that threatened American lives and property there, Denver was instead ordered to proceed from Santa Cruz, California to Mare Island to replenish stores for a trip to San Diego, where she was due 10 August, and after that, on to Central America. At San Diego, Denver's departure was delayed until 13 August due to engine repairs.

=== Nicaragua 1912 ===
Denver's arrival at Nicaragua was further delayed when she stopped on 17 August, to render assistance and attempted to tow off and later, refloat a merchant ship, S.S. Pleiades that had run aground off the coast of Mexico that day. Denver and her crew remained until 21 August; however, their efforts to dislodge the ship were unsuccessful. With the crew and passengers of Pleiades out of danger, Denver continued south to Nicaragua.

For the next five years, Denver cruised the West Coast from San Francisco to the Panama Canal Zone, patrolling the coasts of Nicaragua and Mexico to investigate and prevent threats to the lives and property of Americans during political disturbances, carrying stores and mail, evacuating refugees, and continuing the schedule of exercises which kept her ready for action. Crew members serving on Denver between 29 July and 14 November 1912 qualified for award of the First Nicaraguan Campaign Medal.

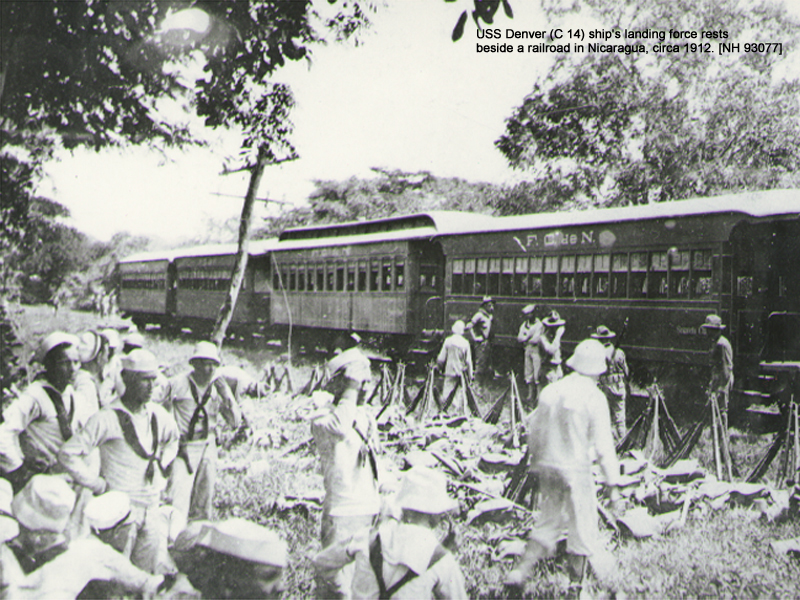
USS Denver ship's landing force under Lt. A. B. Reed rests beside the Corinto, Nicaragua railroad line, 1912

During the First Nicaraguan Campaign, Denver embarked multiple landing parties, the largest, a 120-man landing force under the command of Lieutenant Allen B. Reed landed at Corinto, Nicaragua, for duty ashore between 27 August and 26 October 1912 to secure the railway line running from Corinto to Managua and then south to Granada on the north shore of Lake Nicaragua. One officer and 24 men were landed from Denver at San Juan del Sur on the southern end of the Nicaraguan isthmus from 30 August to 6 September 1912, and from 11 to 27 September 1912 to protect the cable station, custom house and American interests. Denver remained at San Juan del Sur to relay Wireless messages from the other navy ships to and from Washington until departing on 30 September, for patrol duty.

Denver departed Corinto on 26 October 1912 to return to Mare Island with stops at Mexican ports on her way back to California. She was at Manzanillo, Mexico on 1 November and San Diego on 9 December where she remained through 20 December, conducting gunnery practice before returning to Mare Island. In early 1913, Denver made an uneventful 3 1/2-month cruise in Mexican waters, during which time she made stops at Acapulco, Acajutla, San Salvador and Corinto, before arriving at San Diego on 3 May 1913.

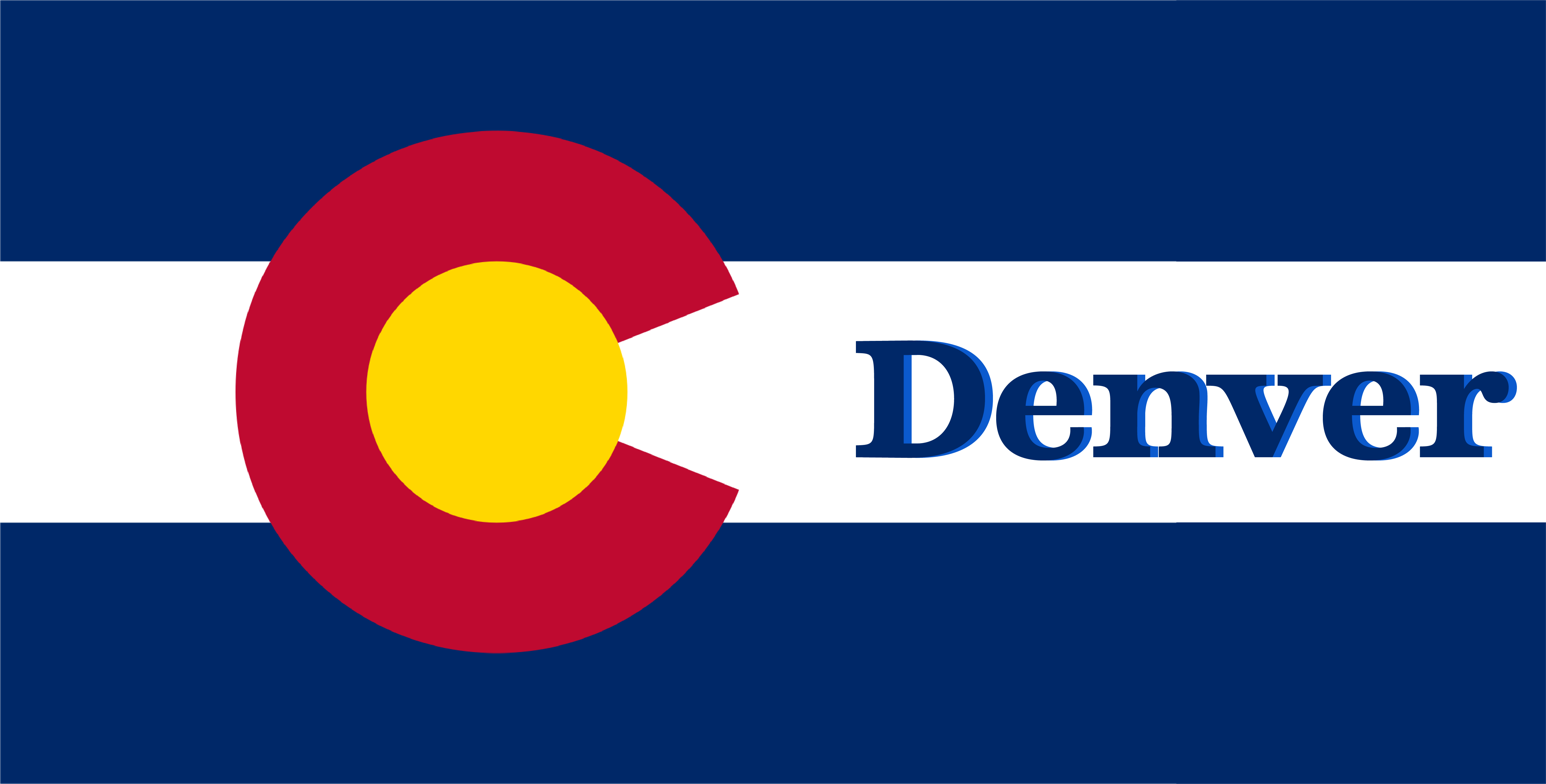
Digital reconstruction of the flag of ship, 1914

From 1913 to early 1917, Denver continued to regularly operate off the Mexican Coast during the ongoing insurrection in Mexico. Crew members serving on Denver on any of the following dates: 7–8 July 1914; 13–24 August 1914; 4 April–29 June 1916; 15 July–14 September 1916 or 16 December 1916 – 7 February 1917 qualified for award of the Mexican Service Medal.

=== World War I ===
Between 6 December 1916 and 30 March 1917 Denver surveyed the Gulf of Fonseca on the coast of Nicaragua, and on 10 April arrived at Key West, Florida, for patrol duty off the Bahamas and between Key West and Cuba.

Denver reported at New York on 22 July 1917 for duty escorting merchant convoys out of New York and Norfolk, Virginia, to a mid-ocean meeting point where destroyers took over the task of convoying men and troops to ports in England and France. Before the close of World War I, Denver made eight such voyages. Crewmembers serving on Denver between 22 August 1917 and 3 November 1918 qualified for the World War I Victory Medal with Escort clasp.

=== Post-war ===
Following the Armistice, Denver was detached on 5 December 1918 to patrol the east coast of South America, returning to New York on 4 June 1919. Between 7 July 1919 and 27 September 1921, she voyaged from New York to San Francisco, serving in the Panama Canal Zone and on the coasts of Central America both outward and homeward bound.

In the summer of 1922, Denver carried Charles D. B. King, the President of Liberia, home to Monrovia from a visit in the United States, returning to Boston by way of the Canal Zone. On 9 October she returned to the Canal Zone for eight years of service based at Cristóbal. She patrolled both coasts of Central America, protecting American interests, transporting various official parties, and paying courtesy calls, returning periodically to Boston for overhaul. Between 20 November and 18 December 1922, she carried relief supplies to earthquake and tsunami victims in Chile.

=== Honduras 1924-1925 ===
On 28 February 1924, a landing force, consisting of the marine detachment and special details under the command of First Lieutenant T.H. Cartwright, U.S.M.C., was landed from Denver at La Ceiba, Honduras, to protect the American Consulate. A battle between the political factions of Honduras was in progress at the time. 29 February 1924, a landing force of 35 men, under the command of Lt. (jg) Rony Snyder, U.S. Navy, was landed from Denver, at La Ceiba, Honduras. The entire landing force was under the command of Major E.W. Sturdevant, U.S.M.C. The landing force from Denver was returned on board ship on 3 March 1924, at Tela, Honduras, by the USS Billingsley. On 4 March 1924, a landing force, consisting of eight officers and 159 men, under the command of Major E.W. Sturdevant, U.S.M.C., was landed from Denver, at Puerto Cortez, Honduras, where a neutral zone was established. This landing force was returned aboard ship on 6 March 1924. On 7 March 1924, a landing force of five officers and 65 men, under the command of Major Sturdevant, U.S.M.C., was landed from Denver, at Puerto Cortez, Honduras. The landing force returned on board Denver on 9 March 1924. On 9 March 1924, a landing force consisting of three officers and 21 men under command of Major Sturdevant, U.S.M.C., was landed from Denver, at La Ceiba, Honduras. This detachment returned aboard ship on 13 March 1924. Crewmen serving between 28 February and 13 March 1924 qualified for award of the Navy Expeditionary Medal. Some 165 US peacekeeping troops commanded by Lt. Theodore Cartwright from Denver were deployed to maintain order in La Ceiba on 19–21 April 1925. Between November 1925 and June 1926, Denver served the Special Commission on Boundaries, Tacna-Arica Arbitration group, carrying dignitaries from Chile to the United States or the Canal Zone on two voyages.

=== Nicaragua 1926 ===
On 10 October 1926, a landing force, consisting of six officers and 103 men, under the command of Commander S.M. La Bounty, was landed from Denver at Corinto, to establish a neutral zone in order to protect the American and foreign lives and property. This force returned aboard ship on 27 October 1926. On 30 November 1926, a landing force, consisting of eight officers, fifty bluejackets and 58 marines, under the command of Commander La Bounty, was landed from Denver at Bluefields. On 27 December 1926, an additional force of 17 marines was landed at Bluefields. The landing force ashore at Bluefields returned aboard ship on 15 and 16 June 1927. On 23 December 1926, a landing force consisting of two officers and 95 men under the command of Lt. (J.G.) L. McKee, was landed from Denver at Puerto Cabezas, to reenforce the landing force of the USS Cleveland. This force returned aboard ship on the same day. Crewmembers serving on her between various dates from September 1926 through October 1930 qualified for award of the Second Nicaraguan Campaign Medal.

Denver's last ceremonial function was her participation in the ceremonies held at Havana from 14 to 19 February 1929 to commemorate the sinking of the Maine. She returned to Philadelphia on 25 December 1930, and there was decommissioned on 14 February 1931 and sold on 13 September 1933.

== Campaigns ==

Cuban Pacification Medal	First Nicaraguan Campaign Medal	Mexican Service Medal	World War I Victory Medal	Navy Expeditionary Medal	Second Nicaraguan Campaign Medal

== Bibliography ==
- Sieche, Erwin F. (1990). "Austria-Hungary's Last Visit to the USA". Warship International. XXVII (2): 142–164. ISSN 0043-0374.
