= Denver-class cruiser =

Early 20th-century class of American naval ships

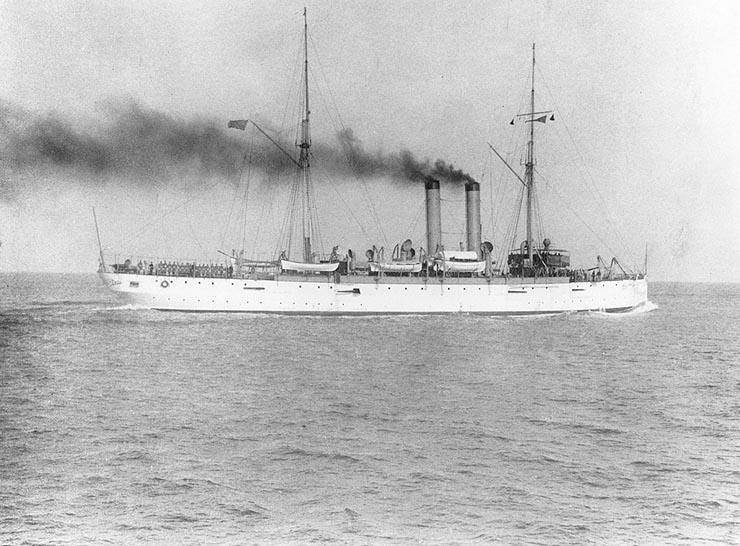
- USS Denver at the North Atlantic Fleet review in 1905

Class overview
- Name: Denver class
- Builders: Bath Iron Works, ME (1); Crescent Shipyard, NJ (1); Fore River Ship & Engine, MA (1); Neafie and Levy, PA (1); Union Iron Works, CA (1); William R. Trigg, VA (1)
- Operators: United States Navy
- Preceded by: Columbia class
- Succeeded by: St. Louis class
- Built: 1900–1905
- In commission: 1903–1929
- Completed: 6
- Lost: 1
- Scrapped: 5

General characteristics (as built)
- Type: Protected Cruiser
- Displacement: 3,200 long tons (3,251 t)
- Length: 308 ft 10 in (94.13 m)
- Beam: 44 ft (13 m)
- Draft: 15 ft 9 in (4.80 m)
- Installed power: 6 × Babcock & Wilcox boilers (275 psi); 2 × triple-expansion engines; 4,700 ihp (3,500 kW) (design)
- Propulsion: 2 × screws
- Speed: 16.41 knots (30.39 km/h; 18.88 mph) (trial)
- Range: 2,200 nmi (4,100 km; 2,500 mi) at 10 kn (19 km/h; 12 mph)
- Complement: 19 officers and 308 enlisted
- Armament: 10 × 5 in (127 mm)/50 caliber Mark 5 rapid firing (RF) guns; 6 × 6-pounder (57 mm (2.2 in)) RF guns; 2 × 1-pounder (37 mm (1.5 in)) RF guns; 4 × .30 cal. (7.62 mm) machine guns
- Armor: Deck: 2 1/2 in (64 mm) slopes, 5/16 in (8 mm) flat, 1 in (25 mm) ends; Casemates: 1 3/4 in (44 mm)

The Denver-class cruisers were a group of six protected cruisers in service with the United States Navy from 1903 through 1929. Authorized by Congress in 1899 as part of the naval buildup sparked by the Spanish–American War, they were designed with peacetime duties on foreign stations and tropical service in mind, specifically for patrolling Latin America and the Caribbean. However, they lacked sufficient armament, armor, and speed to combat most other cruisers. Thus, they were also called "peace cruisers" and were effectively gunboats. They were intended to augment the Montgomery class in these roles.

== Design and construction ==
=== Armament ===
The as-built main armament was ten 5 in (127 mm)/50 caliber Mark 5 rapid firing (RF) guns, arranged one each fore and aft and the remainder in casemates along the sides; the hull was cut away to allow ahead and astern fire from the end casemates. Secondary armament was six 6-pounder (57 mm (2.2 in)) RF guns, two 1-pounder (37 mm (1.5 in)) RF guns, and four .30 caliber (7.62 mm) machine guns, possibly the M1895 Colt–Browning machine gun.

=== Armor ===
Armor protection was very light. The protective deck was 2 1/2 in (64 mm) on the slopes, 5/16 in (8 mm) in the flat middle, and 1 in (25 mm) at the ends. The 5-inch gun casemates had 1 3/4 in (44 mm) armor.

=== Engineering ===
The engineering plant included six coal-fired Babcock & Wilcox boilers supplying 275 psi (1,900 kPa) steam to two vertical triple-expansion engines, totaling 4,700 ihp (3,500 kW) for 16.5 knots (30.6 km/h; 19.0 mph) as designed. On trials Galveston achieved 16.41 knots (30.39 km/h; 18.88 mph) at 5,073 ihp (3,783 kW). The low design speed relegated these ships to the gunboat role or commerce raiding against slower merchant ships. The ships normally carried 467 tons of coal for a service range of 2,200 nmi (4,100 km; 2,500 mi) at 10 kn (19 km/h; 12 mph); this could be increased to 675 tons.

=== Refits ===
By 1918, the forwardmost casemated pair of 5-inch guns had been removed for a total of eight. By 1921 a 3"/50 caliber (76 mm) anti-aircraft gun was added. The 6-pounders remained at this time; the 1-pounders and the machine guns had probably been removed.

== Service ==
Most of the class served in Latin America and the Caribbean on missions ranging from the protection of American citizens and interests, disaster relief, and diplomatic negotiations to military intervention. Galveston and Chattanooga served primarily on the Asiatic Station based in the Philippines until World War I, when they were convoy escorts. Shortly after the war Galveston and Des Moines served in the North Russia Intervention, and Galveston patrolled the Caribbean 1924–30.

In January 1924, Tacoma ran aground and was lost at Blanquilla Reef near Veracruz, Mexico.

Two of the classes were decommissioned in 1921, with the rest decommissioned by early 1931. All were scrapped by late 1933 to comply with the limits of the Washington and London Naval Treaties.

== Legacy ==
Chattanooga's bell was at a now-closed American Legion post in Shelbyville, Tennessee from the 1930s until the 2010s. In late 2015 was at the National Medal of Honor Museum in the Northgate Mall, and soon will be incorporated into a memorial to the victims of the attack on the recruiting station at Chattanooga, Tennessee.

The original ship's bell from the USS Tacoma (C-18) is currently on display at the War Memorial Park in Tacoma, WA.

== Ships in class ==
The six ships of the Denver class were:

Ship	Shipyard	Laid down	Launched	Commissioned	Decommissioned	Fate
USS Denver (C-14)	Neafie & Levy, Philadelphia	28 June 1900	21 June 1902	17 May 1904	14 February 1931	Sold for scrap 13 September 1933
USS Des Moines (C-15)	Fore River Shipyard, Quincy, Massachusetts	28 August 1900	20 September 1902	5 March 1904	9 April 1921	Sold for scrap 11 March 1930
USS Chattanooga (C-16)	Crescent Shipyard, Elizabeth, New Jersey	29 March 1900	7 March 1903	11 October 1904	19 July 1921	Sold for scrap 8 March 1930
USS Galveston (C-17)	William R. Trigg Company, Richmond, Virginia	19 January 1901	23 July 1903	15 February 1905	2 September 1930	Sold for scrap 13 September 1933
USS Tacoma (C-18)	Union Iron Works, San Francisco	27 September 1900	2 June 1903	30 January 1904		Grounded near Veracruz, Mexico, and lost on 16 January 1924
USS Cleveland (C-19)	Bath Iron Works, Bath, Maine	1 June 1900	28 September 1901	2 November 1903	1 November 1929	Sold for scrap 7 March 1930

Construction of Chattanooga was halted on 18 June 1903 when Crescent went out of business; she was completed at the Brooklyn Navy Yard. Galveston's construction was similarly halted on 24 December 1902 with the closure of Trigg; she was completed at the Norfolk Navy Yard.

The Denver-class ships were reclassified with new hull numbers in 1920 as gunboats (PG). They were further reclassified in 1921 as light cruisers (CL) as follows:

Ship name	Original hull number	Reclassified 7 July 1920	Reclassified 8 August 1921
Denver	C-14	PG-28	CL-16
Des Moines	C-15	PG-29	CL-17
Chattanooga	C-16	PG-30	CL-18
Galveston	C-17	PG-31	CL-19
Tacoma	C-18	PG-32	CL-20
Cleveland	C-19	PG-33	CL-21

== See also ==
- List of cruisers of the United States Navy

== Bibliography ==
- Bauer, K. Jack; Roberts, Stephen S. (1991). Register of Ships of the U.S. Navy, 1775–1990: Major Combatants. Westport, Connecticut: Greenwood Press. ISBN 0-313-26202-0.
- Burr, Lawrence (2011). US Cruisers 1883-1904: The Birth of the Steel Navy. Osprey Publishing. ISBN 9781780962702.
- Friedman, Norman (1984). U.S. Cruisers: An Illustrated Design History. Annapolis, Maryland: Naval Institute Press. ISBN 0-87021-718-6.
- Friedman, Norman (2011). Naval Weapons of World War One. Barnsley, South Yorkshire: Seaforth Publishing. ISBN 978-1-84832-100-7.
- Gardiner, Robert; Chesneau, Roger (1979). Conway's All the World's Fighting Ships 1860–1905. New York: Mayflower Books. ISBN 0-8317-0302-4.
- Silverstone, Paul H. (1970). U.S. Warships of World War I. New York: Doubleday. ISBN 0-7110-0095-6.
