= USS Galveston (CL-19) =

Denver-class cruiser

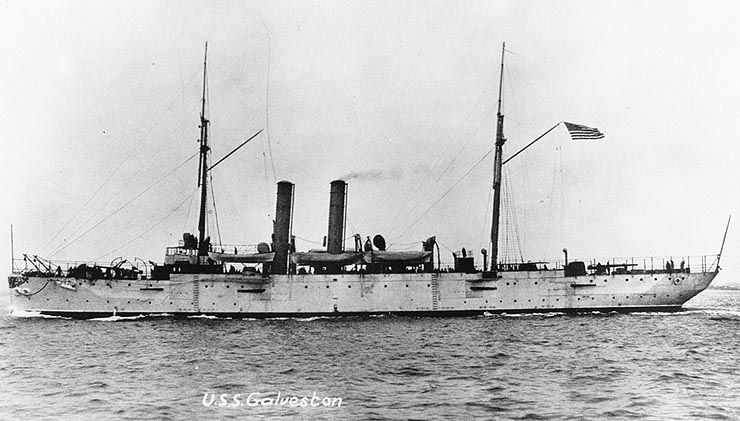
- USS Galveston (CL-19) underway soon after completion, c. 1905. Note that her topmasts are partially lowered.

History

United States
- Name: Galveston
- Namesake: City of Galveston, Texas
- Ordered: 3 March 1899
- Awarded: 14 December 1899
- Builder: William R. Trigg Company, Richmond, Virginia
- Cost: $1,027,000 (contract price of hull and machinery)($32,199,420 in 2021 dollars)
- Laid down: 19 January 1901
- Launched: 23 July 1903
- Sponsored by: Miss Ella Sealey
- Commissioned: 15 February 1905
- Decommissioned: 2 September 1930
- Reclassified: PG-31, 17 July 1920; CL-19, 8 August 1921
- Stricken: 1 November 1930
- Identification: Hull symbol: C-17; Hull symbol: PG-31; Hull symbol: CL-19
- Fate: Sold for scrapping, 13 September 1933

General characteristics (as built)
- Class & type: Denver-class protected cruiser
- Displacement: 3,200 long tons (3,251 t) (standard); 3,514 long tons (3,570 t) (full load)
- Length: 308 ft 9 in (94.11 m) oa; 292 ft (89 m)pp
- Beam: 44 ft (13 m)
- Draft: 15 ft 9 in (4.80 m) (mean)
- Installed power: 6 × Babcock & Wilcox boilers; 21,000 ihp (16,000 kW)
- Propulsion: 2 × vertical triple expansion reciprocating engines; 2 × screws
- Sail plan: Schooner
- Speed: 16.5 knots (30.6 km/h; 19.0 mph); 16.65 knots (30.84 km/h; 19.16 mph) (Speed on Trial)
- Complement: 30 officers 261 enlisted men
- Armament: 10 × 5 in (127 mm)/50 caliber Mark 5 Breech-loading rifles; 8 × 6-pounder (57 mm (2.2 in)) rapid fire guns; 2 × 1-pounder (37 mm (1.5 in)) guns
- Armor: Deck: 2 1/2 in (64 mm) (slope); 3/16 in (4.8 mm) (flat); Shields: 1 3/4 in (44 mm)

General characteristics (1921)
- Armament: 8 × 5 in (127 mm)/50 caliber Mark 5 breech-loading rifles; 1 × 3 in (76 mm)/50 anti-aircraft gun; 6 × 6-pounder (57 mm (2.2 in)) rapid fire guns; 2 × 1-pounder (37 mm (1.5 in)) guns

USS Galveston (C-17/PG-31/CL-19) was a Denver-class protected cruiser in the United States Navy during World War I. She was the first Navy ship named for the city of Galveston, Texas.

Galveston was laid down 19 January 1901 by William R. Trigg Company, Richmond, Virginia; launched 23 July 1903; sponsored by Miss Ella Sealey; and commissioned at Norfolk, Virginia, 15 February 1905.

== Service history ==
=== 1905–1918 ===
Galveston departed Norfolk on 10 April 1905 for Galveston, Texas, where on 19 April she was presented a silver service by citizens of her namesake city. Returning to the East Coast on 3 May, she departed New York on 18 June for Cherbourg, France, where she arrived on 30 June and took part in the ceremonies commemorating the return of the remains of John Paul Jones to the U.S. Naval Academy, reaching Annapolis on 22 July.

She next joined Dolphin and Mayflower as one of the host ships for the Russo-Japanese Peace Conference (4–8 August) serving at Oyster Bay, New York; Newport, Rhode Island, and Portsmouth, New Hampshire. From 13 August to 11 September 1905, the cruiser had special duty with Minister Plenipotentiary Hollander's State Department cruise from Norfolk to the West Indies ports of Santo Domingo and Port-au-Prince, followed by preparations for foreign service at Norfolk and New York.

Galveston departed Tompkinsville, New York, on 28 December 1905 for service in the Mediterranean with the European Squadron until 28 March 1906 when she set course from Port Said to join the fleet at Cavite in the Philippines for service on the Asiatic Station. She was a part of the fleet reception for Secretary of War William H. Taft at Manila on 13 October 1906 and served in his honor escort to Vladivostok, Siberia, the next month.

Galveston spent the following years in cruises among ports of the Philippines, China and Japan. She arrived in San Francisco, California, from the Philippines on 17 February 1910; was decommissioned in the Puget Sound Navy Yard on 21 February; and recommissioned there on 29 June 1912 for service that included a training cruise to Alaska. She left the Puget Sound Navy Yard on 19 September 1913, touching San Francisco, Hawaii and Guam on her way to Cavite, where she joined the Asiatic Fleet on 2 November.

Galveston's tour on the Asiatic Station was largely taken up with convoy service for supply ships and troop transports shuttling Marines and other garrison forces and stores between the Philippines and ports of Japan and China for the protection of American lives, property, and interests with brief intervals of Yangtze River Patrol for the same purpose. She also made one convoy trip from the Philippines to British North Borneo and two trips to Guam in the Marianas. She arrived in San Diego from the Asiatic Station on 10 January 1918 and passed through the Panama Canal on 23 January convoying the British liner acting as a troopship Athenic from Cristobal, in the Canal Zone, to Norfolk, and on to New York, arriving on 11 February 1918.

=== World War I, 1918 ===
Galveston was assigned to Squadron 2 of the Atlantic Fleet Cruiser Force for convoy escort duties concurrent with the training of Armed Guard crews. After one convoy run through heavy weather from Tompkinsville to Halifax, Nova Scotia, she was largely employed in repeated convoy escort voyages between New York and Norfolk until 22 September 1918 when she departed Tompkinsville with a 19-ship convoy bound for Ponta Delgada, Azores. On the morning of 30 September, a convoy straggler was attacked by German submarine U-152. Alerted by the flashing explosion to starboard, Galveston headed for the scene of attack and opened fire on the U-boat. Cargo ship Ticonderoga was shelled and sunk in the 2-hour battle with a loss of 213 lives and the submarine escaped but the remaining ships of the convoy were brought safely into Ponta Delgada on 4 October 1918. Galveston returned to Norfolk on 20 October 1918 to resume her coastal convoy escort work until the Armistice.

=== 1919–1923 ===
She arrived in Plymouth, England, on 26 March 1919; transported a contingent of British-American troops from Harwich to Murmansk, USSR, as part of Allied intervention in the Russian Civil War there; then served as flagship of Squadron 3, Patrol Force, in Western European waters. She was largely concerned with the movement of prize crews and repatriation of crews of German ships until 22 June 1919 when she got underway to serve as station and flagship at Constantinople, Turkey. She arrived on station 14 July 1919 and broke the flag of Rear Admiral Mark L. Bristol; transported refugees and American Red Cross officials to Constantinople from the Russian ports of Novorossiysk and Theodosia; and carried Rear Admiral Newton A. McCully from Theodosia to Yalta. She was relieved as station ship at Constantinople on 15 July 1920 by cruiser Chattanooga.

With the initial assignment of hull classification symbols and numbers to U.S. Navy ships in 1920, Galveston was classified as PG-31. She then returned home by way of Suez Canal and Mediterranean ports and reached Boston on 17 September 1920, and became a unit of the Special Service Squadron watching over American interests in waters ranging to the Panama Canal and down the West Coast of the Central American States to Corinto, Nicaragua. On 8 August 1921 she was reclassified CL-19. She also intermittently patrolled in the Gulf of Mexico with periodic calls at ports of Florida, Texas, Alabama, and Louisiana. The end of this service was climaxed by a visit to her namesake city in Texas, where she arrived from Panama on 26 August 1923 to represent the Navy at the American Legion convention. She then steamed to the Charleston Navy Yard and decommissioned on 30 November 1923.

=== 1924–1930 ===
Galveston was recommissioned on 5 February 1924 for duty with the Special Service Squadron. She based most of her operations out of Cristóbal and Balboa, Panama, in a series of patrols that took her off the coast of Honduras, Cuba, and Nicaragua. On 27 August 1926 she arrived at Bluefields, Nicaragua, landing a force of 195 men at the request of the American Consul to protect American interests during a revolutionary uprising. Thereafter much of her time was spent cruising between that-port and Balboa to cooperate with the State Department in the restoration and preservation of order, and to insure the protection of American lives and property in Central America.

After a voyage north in the fall of 1929 for overhaul in the Boston Navy Yard, Galveston revisited her namesake from 26 to 29 October for the Navy Day celebrations, then touched Cuba on her way to Haiti, where she embarked Marines for transport to the Panama Canal. She resumed her watchful cruises between Balboa and Corinto until 19 May 1930 when she transited the Panama Canal for a last courtesy visit to Galveston (24–31 May) before inactivation overhaul in the Philadelphia Navy Yard.

=== Decommissioning ===
She was decommissioned at Philadelphia on 2 September 1930; struck from the Navy List on 1 November 1930, and sold for scrapping on 13 September 1933 to the Northern Metal Company of Philadelphia.
