= USS Des Moines (CL-17) =

Denver-class cruiser

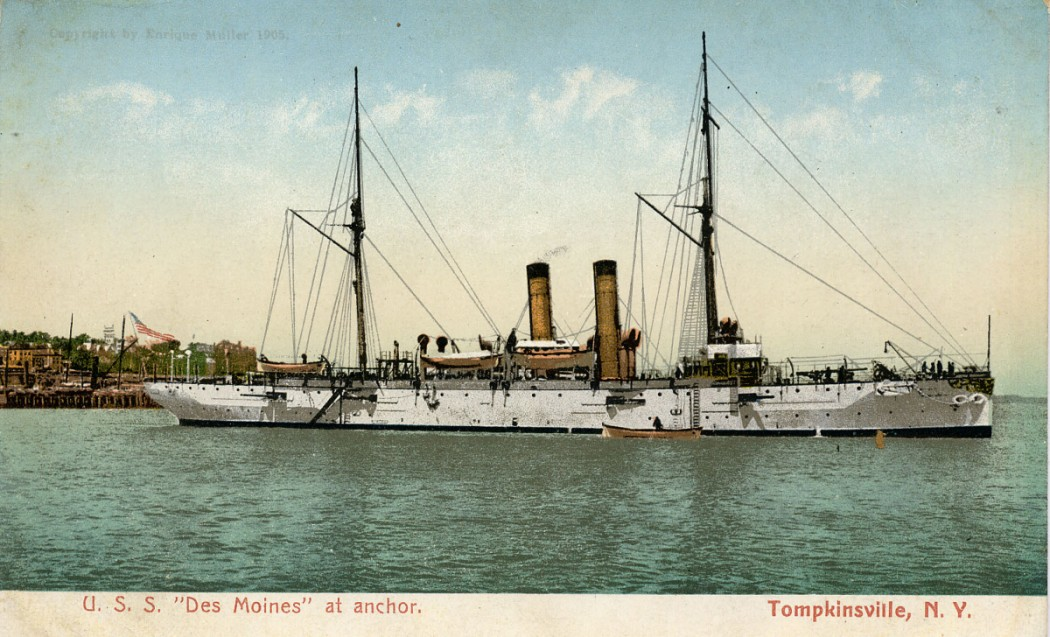
- Post card photo of USS Des Moines (CL-17), at anchor.

History

United States
- Name: Des Moines
- Namesake: City of Des Moines, Iowa
- Ordered: 3 March 1899
- Awarded: 14 December 1899
- Builder: Fore River Ship and Engine Company, Quincy, Massachusetts
- Cost: $1,065,000 (contract price of hull and machinery)
- Yard number: 107
- Laid down: 28 August 1900
- Launched: 20 September 1902
- Sponsored by: Miss Elsie Macomber
- Commissioned: 5 March 1904
- Decommissioned: 9 April 1921
- Reclassified: PG-29, 17 July 1920; CL-17, 8 August 1921
- Identification: Hull symbol: C-15; Hull symbol: PG-29; Hull symbol: CL-17
- Fate: Sold for scrapping, 11 March 1930

General characteristics (as built)
- Class & type: Denver-class protected cruiser
- Displacement: 3,200 long tons (3,251 t) (standard); 3,514 long tons (3,570 t) (full load)
- Length: 308 ft 9 in (94.11 m) oa; 292 ft (89 m)pp
- Beam: 44 ft (13 m)
- Draft: 15 ft 9 in (4.80 m) (mean)
- Installed power: 6 × Babcock & Wilcox boilers; 21,000 ihp (16,000 kW)
- Propulsion: 2 × vertical triple expansion reciprocating engines; 2 × screws
- Sail plan: Schooner
- Speed: 16.5 knots (30.6 km/h; 19.0 mph); 16.65 knots (30.84 km/h; 19.16 mph) (Speed on Trial)
- Complement: 30 officers 261 enlisted men
- Armament: 10 × 5 in (127 mm)/50 caliber Mark 5 Breech-loading rifles; 8 × 6-pounder (57 mm (2.2 in)) rapid fire guns; 2 × 1-pounder (37 mm (1.5 in)) guns
- Armor: Deck: 2 1/2 in (64 mm) (slope); 3/16 in (4.8 mm) (flat); Shields: 1 3/4 in (44 mm)

General characteristics (1921)
- Armament: 8 × 5 in (127 mm)/50 caliber Mark 5 breech-loading rifles; 1 × 3 in (76 mm)/50 anti-aircraft gun; 6 × 6-pounder (57 mm (2.2 in)) rapid fire guns; 2 × 1-pounder (37 mm (1.5 in)) guns

USS Des Moines (C-15/PG-29/CL-17) was a protected cruiser of the Denver class in the United States Navy during World War I. She was the first Navy ship named for the city of Des Moines, Iowa.

Des Moines was launched on 20 September 1902 at the Fore River Ship and Engine Company, Quincy, Massachusetts, sponsored by Miss Elsie Macomber; and commissioned on 5 March 1904.

She was designated PG-29 on 7 July 1920, and redesignated CL-17 on 8 August 1921.

== Service history ==
=== Commissioning & pre-war ===
In June and July 1904 Des Moines cruised in the West Indies and Venezuela. On 29 August cleared Boston for duty with the European Squadron, visiting ports in France, England, Ireland, Norway, the Netherlands, Belgium, Spain and Italy before her arrival at Barbados on 11 December to join the North Atlantic Fleet. With this force she cruised in the Caribbean and Gulf of Mexico in target practice and other exercises, making surveys, and protecting American interests.

Des Moines returned to Boston on 16 February 1906, and for the next 5 years cruised widely in the Atlantic, the Caribbean, and the Gulf of Mexico. She joined in exercises, gave passage to officials and Marines, and took part in ceremonial observances, chief among which were the interment of John Paul Jones at Annapolis in April 1906, and the Naval Review for President Theodore Roosevelt in Oyster Bay in September 1906. In 1908, Templin Potts took command of the ship.

Between 15 April 1910 and 23 January 1911, Des Moines cruised the coast of Africa, gathering information about commercial and political conditions, and called at the Canaries, Lisbon, Cádiz, and Gibraltar. Between March and November 1911 she returned to her Atlantic and West Indian duty, and on 6 December 1911 was placed in reserve for repairs at Boston. Returned to full commission on 3 September 1912, she sailed to the Caribbean to observe and report conditions in the island countries and Central America, and to protect American citizens from political turmoil. She sailed north periodically for overhaul at Portsmouth Navy Yard, and on 24 April 1915 sailed from Guantanamo Bay, Cuba, for Alexandria, Egypt.

=== World War I ===
Between 26 May 1915 and 25 April 1917, Des Moines protected American citizens and interests threatened in the Middle Eastern theater of war, carrying missionaries and other refugees out of Turkey and Syria, delivering relief funds, carrying United States officials, and serving on exercises which took her to ports in Italy, France, Spain, and Algeria. After overhaul at the New York Navy Yard, she joined the Cruiser Force of the Atlantic Fleet for duty escorting merchant convoys from New York and Norfolk, Virginia, to their rendezvous in the Atlantic with destroyers which took up the escort job. In addition to eight such voyages, Des Moines voyaged to Sydney, Nova Scotia, on escort duty, and trained armed guard crews.

While undergoing repairs at New York in January 1919, Des Moines was sent to sea to aid in rescue operations at the scene of the grounded Northern Pacific. All of the fast transport's 2,200 passengers were rescued, 50 of them by Des Moines. She sailed from New York on 11 April 1919 for Archangel, Russia, and duty with the Naval Forces in Northern Russia. Here Des Moines protected American interests from the disturbances of the Bolshevik Revolution, and carried home American troops who had served around Archangel, returning to Portsmouth, New Hampshire, on 27 October.

=== Post war & decommissioning ===
Des Moines cruised off Mexico between May and September 1920, reporting on political conditions, and joining in relief efforts during an epidemic of the plague. She joined the Special Service Squadron based at the Panama Canal Zone to cruise Central American waters, and the west coast of South America promoting friendly relations between the United States and its sister American republics until 5 March 1921, when she returned to the Portsmouth Navy Yard. There she was decommissioned 9 April 1921, and sold to Union Shipbuilding Company for scrapping on 11 March 1930. Des Moines was towed from Portsmouth to the company's ship breaking yard in Baltimore, Maryland by the steamer Columbine. She arrived there on 2 April 1930.
