= USS Chattanooga (CL-18) =

Denver-class protected cruiser

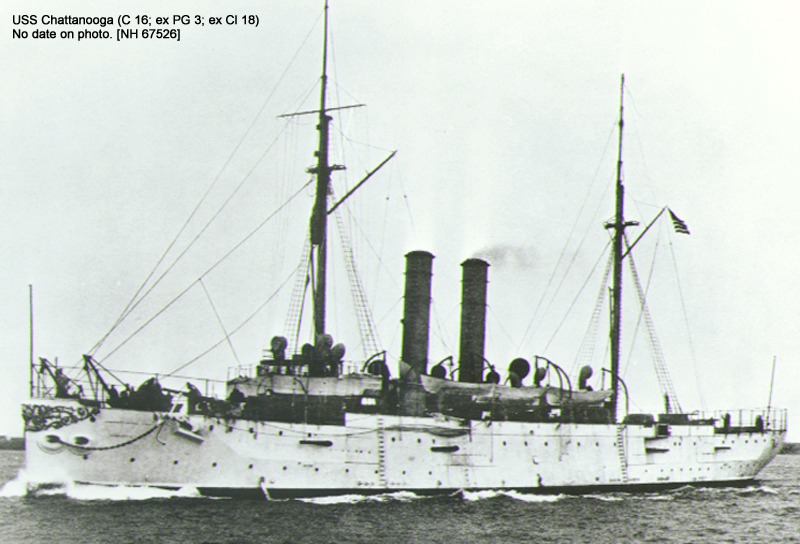
- USS Chattanooga (C-16), USN photograph, unknown date.

History

United States
- Name: Chattanooga
- Namesake: City of Chattanooga, Tennessee
- Ordered: 3 March 1899
- Awarded: 14 December 1899
- Builder: Crescent Shipyard, Elizabethport, New Jersey
- Cost: $1,039,966 (contract price of hull and machinery)
- Laid down: 29 March 1900
- Launched: 7 March 1903
- Sponsored by: Miss L. N. Chambliss
- Acquired: 3 March 1905
- Commissioned: 11 October 1904
- Decommissioned: 19 July 1921
- Reclassified: PG-30, 17 July 1920; CL-18, 8 August 1921
- Stricken: 13 December 1929
- Identification: Hull symbol: C-16; Hull symbol: PG-30; Hull symbol: CL-18
- Fate: Sold for scrap, 8 March 1930

General characteristics (as built)
- Class & type: Denver-class protected cruiser
- Displacement: 3,200 long tons (3,251 t) (standard); 3,514 long tons (3,570 t) (full load)
- Length: 308 ft 9 in (94.11 m) oa; 292 ft (89 m)pp
- Beam: 44 ft (13 m)
- Draft: 15 ft 9 in (4.80 m) (mean)
- Installed power: 6 × Babcock & Wilcox boilers; 21,000 ihp (16,000 kW)
- Propulsion: 2 × vertical triple expansion reciprocating engines; 2 × screws
- Sail plan: Schooner
- Speed: 16.5 knots (30.6 km/h; 19.0 mph); 16.75 knots (31.02 km/h; 19.28 mph) (Speed on Trial)
- Complement: 31 officers 261 enlisted men
- Armament: 10 × 5 in (127 mm)/50 caliber Mark 5 Breech-loading rifles; 8 × 6-pounder (57 mm (2.2 in)) rapid fire guns; 2 × 1-pounder (37 mm (1.5 in)) guns
- Armor: Deck: 2 1/2 in (64 mm) (slope); 3/16 in (4.8 mm) (flat); Shields: 1 3/4 in (44 mm)

General characteristics (1921)
- Armament: 8 × 5 in (127 mm)/50 caliber Mark 5 breech-loading rifles; 1 × 3 in (76 mm)/50 anti-aircraft gun; 6 × 6-pounder (57 mm (2.2 in)) rapid fire guns; 2 × 1-pounder (37 mm (1.5 in)) guns

USS Chattanooga (C-16/PG-30/CL-18) was a Denver-class protected cruiser in the United States Navy during World War I. She was the second Navy ship named for the city of Chattanooga, Tennessee.

== Construction ==
Chattanooga was one of six Denver-class protected cruisers ordered for the US Navy on 14 December 1899. She was laid down at the Crescent Shipyard of Elizabethport, New Jersey on 29 March 1900, and launched on 7 March 1903. Construction was much slower than contracted (the contracted completion date was 14 June 1902), and when the shipbuilding trust that owned the Crescent Shipyard, the US Government cancelled the contract and took possession of the part-completed ship, which was moved to the New York Navy Yard for finishing in October 1903.

Chattanooga was commissioned on 11 October 1904. After sea trials in January 1905, during which she reached a speed of 16.65 knots (30.84 km/h; 19.16 mph) in a four-hour trial, she reported to the Atlantic Fleet.

== Service history ==
=== Pre-war service ===
Chattanooga's first cruise following shakedown was to the Caribbean, from which she returned to New York City to join the squadron which cleared for Cherbourg, France 18 June 1905. At Cherbourg, USS Brooklyn (CA-3) received on board the body of John Paul Jones, which the squadron brought home to the United States Naval Academy, arriving at Annapolis 23 July. Through the remainder of the year, Chattanooga aided in training men of the Maine and Massachusetts Naval Militia, and cruised briefly in the Caribbean. On 28 December she cleared San Juan, Puerto Rico, for the Suez Canal and duty in the Pacific. Between 29 April 1906, when she arrived at Cavite, P.I., and 10 August 1910, when she reported at Puget Sound Navy Yard for inactivation, Chattanooga joined the Asiatic Fleet in its winter operations in the Philippines and summer cruises to China, aiding in representing America's strength and interest in the Orient. Chattanooga was decommissioned at Puget Sound Navy Yard 17 September 1910.

=== World War I ===
Chattanooga was placed in reserve commission 31 August 1912, remaining at Puget Sound, and in full commission 21 April 1914, for duty in Mexican waters. Through 1915 and 1916, she cruised to protect American interests from the disorder of the Mexican Revolution, and this duty continued after America's entrance into World War I until May 1917. Chattanooga then sailed through the Panama Canal for several months of patrol duties in the Caribbean, searching for German raiders. From July 1917, she escorted convoys from the Atlantic coast to rendezvous with other escorts in the approaches to French ports. This rugged duty across the stormy mid-Atlantic was broken only by two escort missions to Nova Scotia.

Chattanooga took part in the Victory Fleet Review taken by the Secretary of the Navy in New York harbor 26 December 1918. After an overhaul, the cruiser carried a party of Liberian officials to Monrovia, then turned north for Plymouth, England, which she reached 7 May. As flagship of U.S. Naval Forces, European Waters, Chattanooga sailed among English and French ports until June, though on 1 April 1919, she, along with USS Tallahassee, took part in the closure of the United States Navy facilities on White's Island and Agar's Island in the British Imperial fortress colony of Bermuda, 640 miles off North Carolina. On 29 June, she served as leading honor escort guarding President Woodrow Wilson's departure from France in George Washington, then sailed on to call at German and Belgian ports before arriving in the Mediterranean for service as flagship for U.S. Naval Forces, Turkish Waters. Cruising primarily in the Black Sea, she also served in the Adriatic in connection with the disposal of ships of the former Austro-Hungarian Navy. From January through May 1921, she conducted regular patrols with the cruiser squadron assigned to European waters, and on 1 June, returned to the United States. She was decommissioned at Boston 19 July 1921, and laid up at Portsmouth Navy Yard until sold 8 March 1930.

Chattanooga's bell was at a now-closed American Legion post in Shelbyville Tennessee, in late 2015 was at the National Medal of Honor Museum in the Northgate Mall, and soon will be incorporated into a memorial to the victims of the attack on the recruiting station at Chattanooga, Tennessee.
