= USS Tacoma (CL-20) =

Denver-class cruiser

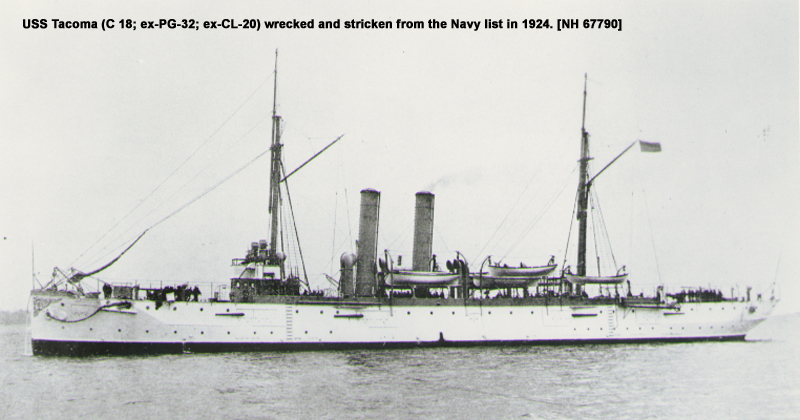
- USS Tacoma (C-18), port side, underway, date unknown.

History

United States
- Name: Tacoma
- Namesake: City of Tacoma, Washington
- Ordered: 3 March 1899
- Awarded: 14 December 1899
- Builder: Union Iron Works, Mare Island, California
- Cost: $1,041,900 (contract price of hull and machinery)
- Laid down: 27 September 1900
- Launched: 2 June 1903
- Sponsored by: Miss Julia M. Harris
- Commissioned: 30 January 1904
- Reclassified: PG-32, 7 July 1920; CL-20, 8 August 1921
- Stricken: 7 February 1924
- Identification: Hull symbol: C-18; Hull symbol: PG-32; Hull symbol: CL-20
- Fate: Ran aground at Blanquilla Reef, Vera Cruz, 16 January 1924

General characteristics (as built)
- Class & type: Denver-class protected cruiser
- Displacement: 3,200 long tons (3,251 t) (standard); 3,514 long tons (3,570 t) (full load)
- Length: 308 ft 9 in (94.11 m) oa; 292 ft (89 m)pp
- Beam: 44 ft (13 m)
- Draft: 15 ft 9 in (4.80 m) (mean)
- Installed power: 6 × Babcock & Wilcox boilers; 21,000 ihp (16,000 kW)
- Propulsion: 2 × vertical triple expansion reciprocating engines; 2 × screws
- Sail plan: Schooner
- Speed: 16.5 knots (30.6 km/h; 19.0 mph); 16.65 knots (30.84 km/h; 19.16 mph) (Speed on Trial)
- Complement: 30 officers 261 enlisted men
- Armament: 10 × 5 in (127 mm)/50 caliber Mark 5 Breech-loading rifles; 8 × 6-pounder (57 mm (2.2 in)) rapid fire guns; 2 × 1-pounder (37 mm (1.5 in)) guns
- Armor: Deck: 2 1/2 in (64 mm) (slope); 3/16 in (4.8 mm) (flat); Shields: 1 3/4 in (44 mm)

General characteristics (1921)
- Armament: 8 × 5 in (127 mm)/50 caliber Mark 5 breech-loading rifles; 1 × 3 in (76 mm)/50 anti-aircraft gun; 6 × 6-pounder (57 mm (2.2 in)) rapid fire guns; 2 × 1-pounder (37 mm (1.5 in)) guns

USS Tacoma (C-18/PG-32/CL-20) was a Denver-class protected cruiser in the United States Navy during World War I. She was the second Navy ship named after the city of Tacoma, Washington.

== Construction and commissioning ==
Tacoma was laid down on 27 September 1900 at Mare Island, California, by the Union Iron Works. She was launched on 2 June 1903, sponsored by Miss Julia M. Harris, and commissioned on 30 January 1904, Commander Reginald Fairfax Nicholson in command.

== Service history ==
=== Pre-World War I ===
Following a post-commissioning visit to her namesake city, Tacoma, Washington, the protected cruiser voyaged to Hawaii in April and May. She returned to San Francisco on 2 June and, a month later, sailed for Cape Horn. During the voyage, she participated in the search for merchant ship SS Conemaugh, which had departed from Valparaíso, Chile, and vanished. After rounding the Horn and steaming up the Atlantic coast of South and North America, Tacoma entered New York Harbor on 5 November and remained there until joining the North Atlantic Fleet on 1 January 1905.

Following the completion of maneuvers off Culebra Island on 25 January, Tacoma sailed for Hispaniola where she performed special duty protecting American interests during one of the many periods of turmoil that have troubled that island. Following that assignment, Tacoma conducted target practice off the Florida coast between 27 March and 25 April. She returned to New York on 19 May to prepare for a voyage to Europe.

On 18 June, she sailed for France and arrived at Cherbourg on 30 June. She remained there while a battalion of sailors went to Paris to participate in ceremonies honoring the remains of John Paul Jones which were being returned to the United States. On 8 July, Tacoma departed Cherbourg to escort the remains, aboard USS Brooklyn (CA-3), to their final resting place at Annapolis, Maryland. After the ceremony at the United States Naval Academy on 24 July, the warship proceeded to Tompkinsville, New York. On 5 August, she embarked Japanese diplomats at New York and transported them to Sagamore Hill, President Theodore Roosevelt's summer home at Oyster Bay, New York. There, they first met the Russian commissioners for the peace negotiations which were later held at Portsmouth, New Hampshire, and resulted in the termination of the Russo-Japanese War. Tacoma returned to Philadelphia on the 8th and conducted training for the Pennsylvania and Massachusetts naval militias before rejoining the North Atlantic Fleet for operations in the Caribbean Sea.

Deployed to the Mediterranean for the first five months of 1906, the ship visited Tangier, Algiers, Ville-Franche, Naples, and Genoa. After a trip to Grand Canary Island, she returned to the Mediterranean and visited Alexandria and Port Said before returning to the U.S. in June.

For the next ten years, except for an eight-month period in reserve at Philadelphia in 1911 and 1912, Tacoma alternated service along the east coast with cruises to the Caribbean and West Indies protecting American citizens and interests there during this turbulent period.

In late 1906 and early 1907, Cuba was the major trouble spot; and the cruiser operated along her coasts from late September until mid-November and again from late December until June, visiting Havana, Tunas, Manzanilla, Santiago de Cuba, Cienfuegos, and Guantanamo Bay. She returned to the West Indies again in the spring of 1908 for stops at St. Thomas, St. Christopher, Martinique, Margarita Island, Port Mochima, Cunamá, La Guaira, and Curaçao. During the second half of 1908 and the first half of 1909, she observed political conditions in Haiti and Honduras. From July to September 1909, the cruiser operated of Nicaragua. Later, her itinerary included a visit to Costa Rica and a return to Honduras, all in an effort to bring the steadying influence of American military power to the volatile Latin American republics.

Between January and March 1910, Tacoma cruised off the coast of Nicaragua and visited the Canal Zone and Costa Rica. After a spring voyage to the east coast of the United States, the ship headed back to Central America to protect United States interests there. During the following nine months, she visited Panama, Honduras, Costa Rica, Nicaragua, and Guatemala. In January 1911, pursuant to the orders of the senior naval officer present embarked in the gunboat Marietta, Tacoma prevented the converted yacht Hornet from participating in an insurrection against the government financed by U.S. banana baron Samuel Zemurray. Later that month, she landed a force of marines at Puerto Cortés, Honduras, to protect American banana companies. Negotiations were held aboard which resulted in Francisco Bertrand being named interim President of Honduras. In February, her deck was the scene of a peace conference conducted by special commissioner T. C. Dawson. The negotiations brought the revolution to a close and established a new provisional government in Honduras. That summer, Tacoma steamed – via Puerto Mexico and Galveston – to New York. She remained at the New York Navy Yard until mid-November when she went into reserve at Philadelphia.

In July 1912, Tacoma came out of reserve and was soon on her way back to the troubled waters of the Gulf of Mexico. Late that month, a revolution broke out in Nicaragua and lasted until November. The cruiser patrolled almost incessantly off the Nicaraguan coast at Bluefields and at Great Corn Island from 3 August to 25 October. In November, she headed – via Tampico, Mexico, and Galveston, Texas – for the Navy Yard at Boston where she remained through mid-February 1913. By the 22nd, she was back patrolling and observing, this time along the coasts of Honduras and Guatemala. The ship returned to New York in July; then operated off the Mexican coast. She cruised off Tampico and Vera Cruz until January 1914 when she returned to the east coast of the U.S. for repairs.

Tacoma resumed operations in Mexican waters early in May in the wake of the Tampico Incident and the resultant seizure of the customs house at Vera Cruz. The warship cruised the Mexican coast through September during the latter stages of the Huerta-Carranza struggle and while the new Carranza government consolidated its power against former allies, notably Pancho Villa and Emiliano Zapata.

Late in September 1914, Tacoma departed the Mexican coast; steamed, via Jamaica and Cuba, to Haiti, and patrolled off Cape Haitien until early December. After a visit to the Canal Zone, the cruiser returned to Haiti in February; then moved to Santo Domingo in March. On 21 March, she entered the Portsmouth (N.H.) Navy Yard for repairs.

While at Portsmouth, Tacoma was placed in reserve. On 19 May 1916, she shifted to Boston, Massachusetts, where she served as receiving ship. On 1 December, she again was placed in full commission. She made another voyage to Mexican waters for patrol duty from January to April 1917.

=== World War I ===
Upon U.S. entry into World War I, Tacoma returned to the Atlantic seaboard to prepare for convoy duty. During the war, she made five round trips to Europe protecting troop and supply convoys. While returning to the U.S. from her third voyage to Europe, she stopped at Halifax, Nova Scotia, just after the French munitions ship, SS Mont-Blanc exploded on 6 December 1917 and severely damaged the city in the Halifax Explosion. Tacoma assisted in relief work; and, for eight days, the cruiser's officers and men worked diligently to help the devastated port community.

=== Post-war ===
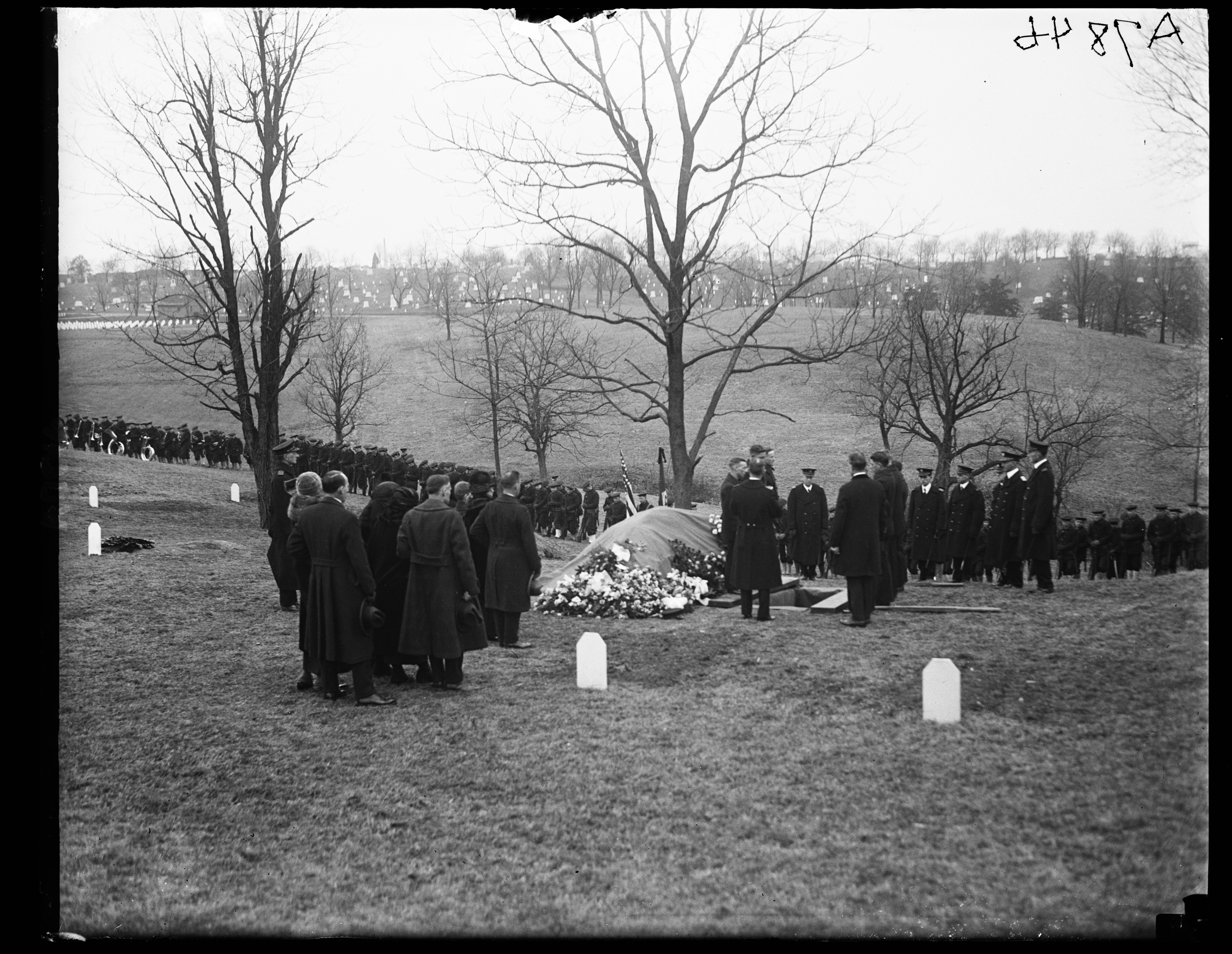
Funeral of Captain Herbert G. Sparrow at Arlington National Cemetery (February 14, 1924)

At the end of the war, the cruiser joined the Pacific Squadron and served with it until 1920. Early that year, she returned to her old duty of encouraging stability in the perennially volatile Caribbean. As a unit of the Special Service Squadron, which was ordered to observe events in Latin America and the Caribbean and to protect American interests in those areas, Tacoma patrolled the isthmian coast until January 1924. During that time, she was redesignated a light cruiser, CL-20.

During a heavy storm on 16 January, the warship ran aground on Blanquilla Reef near Veracruz. For almost a week, her crew tried without success to free her, her captain and three crewmen–Captain Herbert G. Sparrow, Radioman Second Class Edward Thaxter Herrick, Radioman First Class Homer Harry Lussier, and Radioman Third Class Solomon Sivin–drowning in those attempts. After a board of inquiry, the Navy struck her name from the Naval Vessel Register on 7 February 1924. She was sold to R. Sebastian of the American Consulate at Veracruz on 5 September 1924.

== Legacy ==
The original ship's bell from the Tacoma, is currently on display at the War Memorial Park in Tacoma, Washington.
