= 5-inch/50-caliber gun =

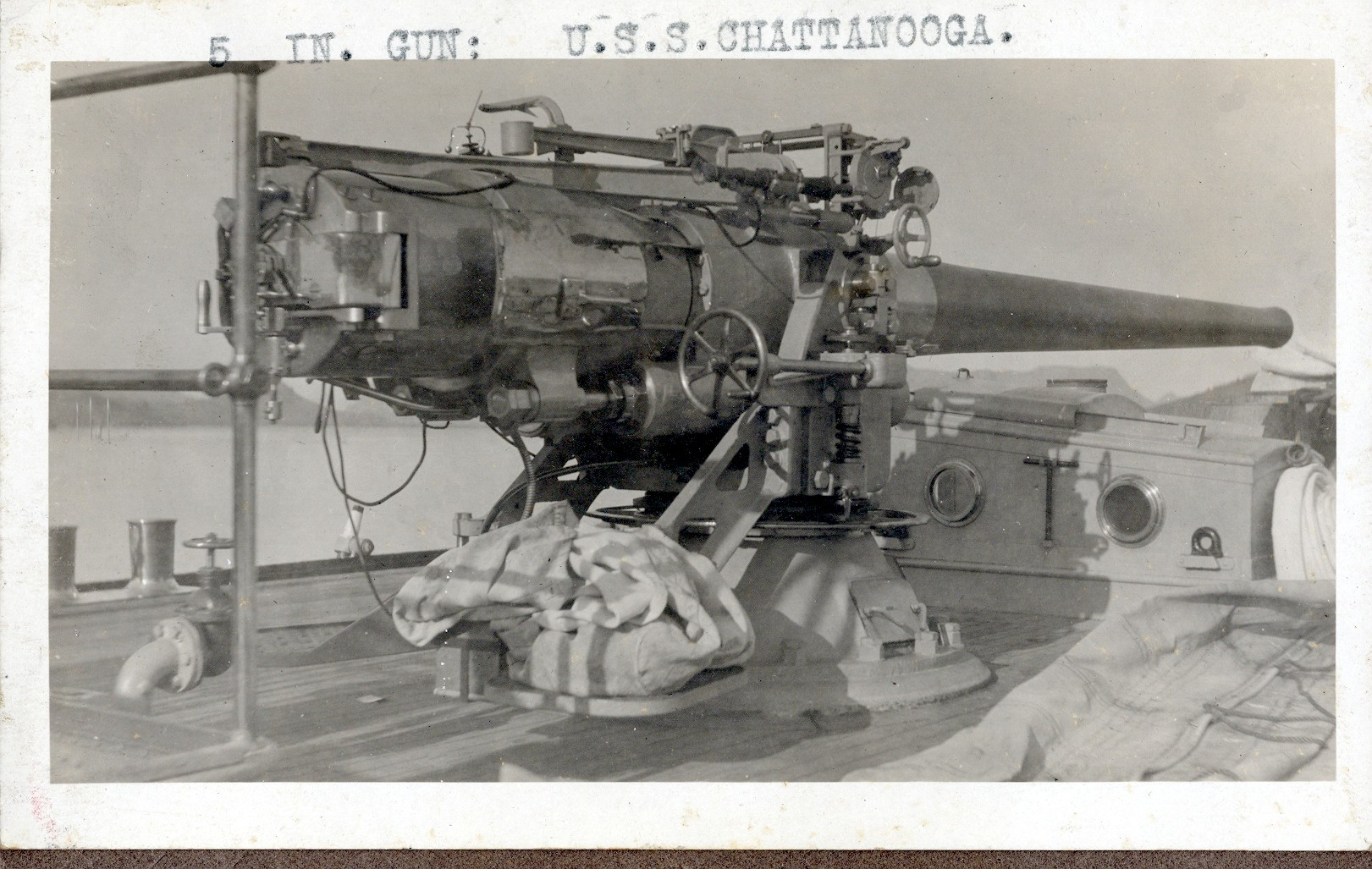
- Chattanooga, 5"/50 caliber deck gun, probably port side forward.
- Type: Naval gun; Coastal gun
- Place of origin: United States

Service history
- In service: 1904
- Used by: United States Navy
- Wars: World War I; World War II

Production history
- Designer: Bureau of Ordnance
- Designed: 1900
- Manufacturer: U.S. Naval Gun Factory
- No. built: Mark 5: 87 (Nos. 200–286); Mark 6: 64 (Nos. 293–356)
- Variants: Mark 5 Mods 0–3, Mark 6 Mods 0–2

Specifications
- Mass: Mark 5: 10,294 lb (4,669 kg) (with breech); Mark 6: 10,550 lb (4,790 kg) (with breech)
- Length: Marks 5 and 6: 255.65 in (6,494 mm)
- Barrel length: Marks 5 and 6: 250 in (6,400 mm) bore (50 calibers)
- Shell: Mark 5: 60 lb (27 kg) armor-piercing; Mark 6: 50 lb (23 kg) armor-piercing
- Caliber: 5 in (127 mm)
- Elevation: Mark 9: −10° to +15°; Mark 12: −10° to +25°
- Traverse: −150° to +150°
- Rate of fire: 6–8 rounds per minute
- Muzzle velocity: 50lb:3,000 ft/s (910 m/s); 60lb:2,700 ft/s (820 m/s)
- Maximum firing range: 19,000 yd (17,000 m) at 25.3° elevation

The 5"/50 caliber gun (spoken "five-inch-fifty-caliber") was the first long barrel 5-inch (127 mm) gun of the United States Navy and was used in the secondary batteries of the early Delaware-class dreadnought battleships, various protected cruisers, and scout cruisers. They were also refitted in the secondary batteries of the armored cruiser New York and the New Orleans-class protected cruisers. They were later used on cargo ships, store ships and unclassified auxiliaries during World War II as well as in emergency coastal defense batteries.

== Design ==
The Mark 5, Nos. 200 – 286, was a 50 caliber naval gun of a simplified construction by combining the breech piece along with the chase hoop into one long tube that was shrunk on from the muzzle. Mod 1 was a Mod 0 gun that was relined with a conical nickel-steel liner and an additional gun-steel chase hoop that extended to the muzzle that was secured by a nickel-steel locking ring. Mod 2, gun No. 280, had a slightly different liner with Mod 3, gun No. 245, was a Mod 0 gun with its gun-steel tube replaced with a nickel-steel tube with a gun-steel chase hoop added that extended all the way to the muzzle. The Mod 3 gun had a longer chase hoop and shorter jacket compare to Mods 1 and 2.

The Mark 6, gun Nos. 293 – 356, was the bag-ammunition equivalent to the Mark 5 gun. Mod 0, Nos. 323 – 356, had a single jacket constructed of nickel-steel, that replaced the jacket, chase hoop and locking ring of the Mark 5. Mod 1, Nos. 293 – 306 and 308, was built of gun-steel with a chamber of a different design with some external differences to fit it onto different mountings. The Mod 2, Nos. 307 and 309 – 322, had the same chamber as the Mod 0 but was otherwise almost identical to the Mod 1.

== Naval Service ==
Ship	Gun Installed	Gun Mount
USS Delaware (BB-28)	Mark 6 Mod 0: 14 × 5"/50 caliber (Nos. 343–356)	Mark 9 and 12
USS North Dakota (BB-29)	Mark 6 Mod 0: 14 × 5"/50 caliber (Nos. 329–342)	Mark 9 and 12
USS New York (ACR-2)	Mark 6 Mod 1: 10 × 5"/50 caliber (Nos. 295–304) (1907 refit)	Unknown
USS Denver (C-14)	Mark 5: 10 × 5"/50 caliber	Unknown
USS Des Moines (C-15)	Mark 5: 10 × 5"/50 caliber	Unknown
USS Chattanooga (C-16)	Mark 5: 10 × 5"/50 caliber	Unknown
USS Galveston (C-17)	Mark 5: 10 × 5"/50 caliber	Unknown
USS Tacoma (C-18)	Mark 5: 10 × 5"/50 caliber	Unknown
USS Cleveland (C-19)	Mark 5: 10 × 5"/50 caliber	Unknown
USS Chester (CS-1)	Mark 6 Mod 0: 2 × 5"/50 caliber (Nos. 323–324)	Unknown
USS Birmingham (CS-2)	Mark 6 Mod 0: 2 × 5"/50 caliber (Nos. 325–326)	Unknown
USS Salem (CS-3)	Mark 6 Mod 0: 2 × 5"/50 caliber (Nos. 327–328)	Unknown
USS New Orleans (CL-22)	Mark 5: 10 × 5"/50 caliber (1904 and 1907 refits)	Unknown
USS Albany (CL-23)	Mark 5: 10 × 5"/50 caliber (1904 and 1907 refits)	Unknown

The 5-inch/50 caliber gun was also used on cargo ships, store ships and unclassified auxiliaries during World War II.
