= USS Cleveland (C-19) =

Denver-class cruiser

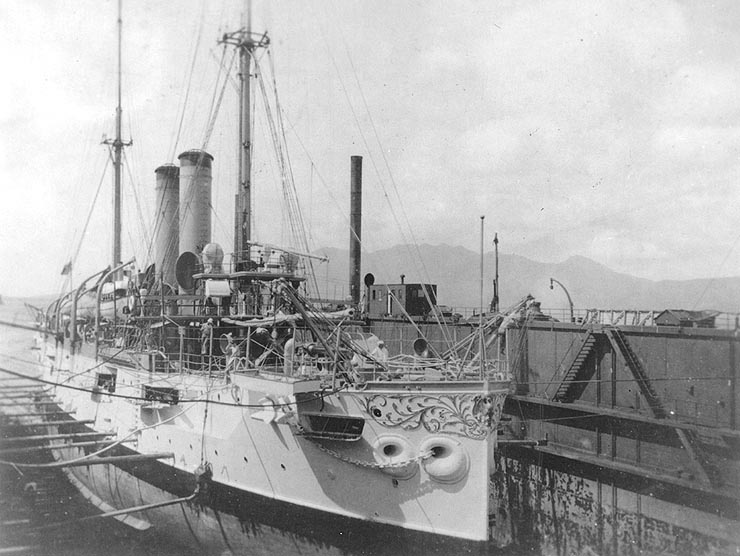
- USS Cleveland (C-19), in Dewey, floating dry dock, Olongapo Naval Station, Philippine Islands, 14 January 1908.

History

United States
- Name: Cleveland
- Namesake: City of Cleveland, Ohio
- Ordered: 3 March 1899
- Awarded: 14 December 1899
- Builder: Bath Iron Works, Bath, Maine
- Cost: $1,041,650 (contract price of hull and machinery)
- Laid down: 1 June 1900
- Launched: 28 September 1901
- Sponsored by: Miss R. Hanna
- Commissioned: 2 November 1903
- Decommissioned: 1 November 1929
- Reclassified: PG-33, 7 July 1920; CL-21, 8 August 1921
- Stricken: 13 December 1929
- Identification: Hull symbol: C-19; Hull symbol: PG-33; Hull symbol: CL-21
- Fate: Sold for scrap 7 March 1930, in accordance with the Washington Naval Treaty, limiting naval armament

General characteristics (as built)
- Class & type: Denver-class protected cruiser
- Displacement: 3,200 long tons (3,251 t) (standard); 3,514 long tons (3,570 t) (full load)
- Length: 308 ft 9 in (94.11 m) oa; 292 ft (89 m)pp
- Beam: 44 ft (13 m)
- Draft: 15 ft 9 in (4.80 m) (mean)
- Installed power: 6 × Babcock & Wilcox boilers; 21,000 ihp (16,000 kW)
- Propulsion: 2 × vertical triple expansion reciprocating engines; 2 × screws
- Sail plan: Schooner
- Speed: 16.5 knots (30.6 km/h; 19.0 mph); 16.65 knots (30.84 km/h; 19.16 mph) (Speed on Trial)
- Complement: 30 officers 261 enlisted men
- Armament: 10 × 5 in (127 mm)/50 caliber Mark 5 Breech-loading rifles; 8 × 6-pounder (57 mm (2.2 in)) rapid fire guns; 2 × 1-pounder (37 mm (1.5 in)) guns
- Armor: Deck: 2 1/2 in (64 mm) (slope); 3/16 in (4.8 mm) (flat); Shields: 1 3/4 in (44 mm)

General characteristics (1921)
- Armament: 8 × 5 in (127 mm)/50 caliber Mark 5 breech-loading rifles; 1 × 3 in (76 mm)/50 anti-aircraft gun; 6 × 6-pounder (57 mm (2.2 in)) rapid fire guns; 2 × 1-pounder (37 mm (1.5 in)) guns

USS Cleveland (C-19/PG-33/CL-21) was a United States Navy Denver-class protected cruiser.

== Construction ==
She was launched 28 September 1901 by Bath Iron Works, Bath, Maine, sponsored by "Miss R. Hanna" (probably Ruth Hanna McCormick), and commissioned 2 November 1903, with Commander William Henry Hudson Southerland in command.

== Service history ==
The Cleveland cruised with the European Squadron, in West Indies and Cuban waters, along the east coast between Hampton Roads and Boston, and on a midshipmen training cruise until 17 May 1907. She then sailed from New York via Gibraltar, Port Said, Aden, Colombo and Singapore to Cavite, arriving 1 August 1907. After three years on the Asiatic station, the Cleveland returned to Mare Island Navy Yard 1 August 1910. Decommissioned 3 August 1910, she was placed in second reserve 8 April 1912, and returned to full commission 31 August 1912.

The Cleveland alternated patrols in waters off Mexico and Central America with reserve periods at Mare Island Navy Yard between 1912 and 1917, protecting American lives and interests from the turmoil of revolution. On 31 March 1917, she arrived at Hampton Roads, and from 9 April to 22 June, patrolled from Cape Hatteras to Charleston. Assigned to escort convoys to a mid-ocean meeting point, the Cleveland made seven voyages between June 1917 and December 1918. In November 1919, Cleveland returned the body of former Salvadoran president Carlos Meléndez (who had died in New York in August 1919) to La Libertad, El Salvador.

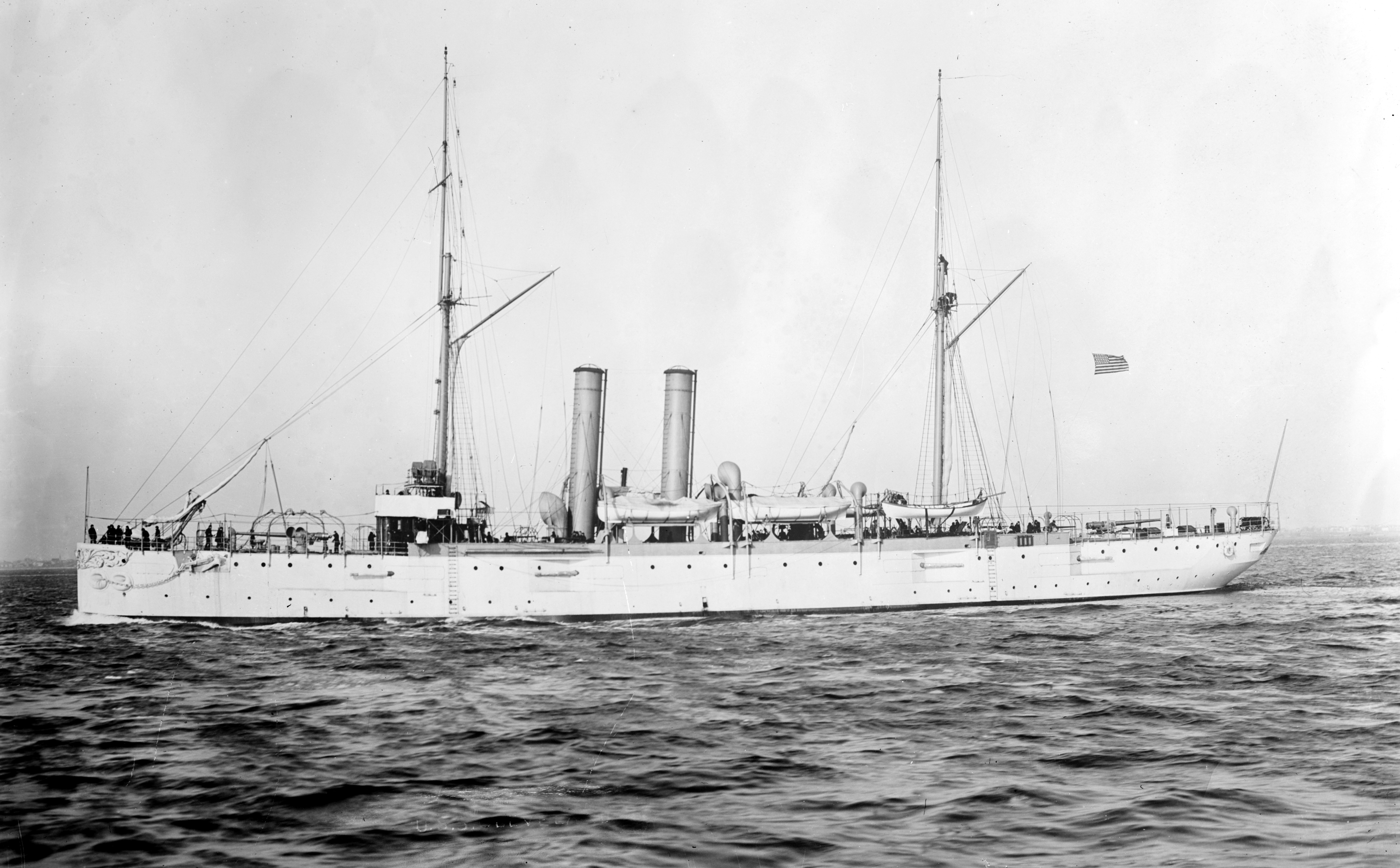
USS Cleveland

Returning to patrols off Central and South America, the Cleveland was assigned to the Pacific Fleet once more from 16 February 1920, returning to Caribbean waters from time to time. She was reclassified CL-21 on 8 August 1921. During her continued service in the Caribbean and along the South American coasts, the Cleveland made courtesy calls, supported diplomatic activities, gave disaster relief, and represented American interests in troubled areas.

Cleveland was decommissioned at Boston 1 November 1929, and sold to the Union Shipbuilding Company of Baltimore, Maryland for scrapping on 7 March 1930 in accordance with the Washington Naval Treaty limiting naval armament. The price for the ship was $32,000. The company's steamer Columbine took the cruiser in tow at Boston on 8 April 1930 to bring her to the ship breaking yard in Baltimore.

== Bibliography ==
- Sieche, Erwin F. (1990). "Austria-Hungary's Last Visit to the USA". Warship International. XXVII (2): 142–164. ISSN 0043-0374.
