= USLHT Columbine (1892) =

Tender of the United States Lighthouse Service

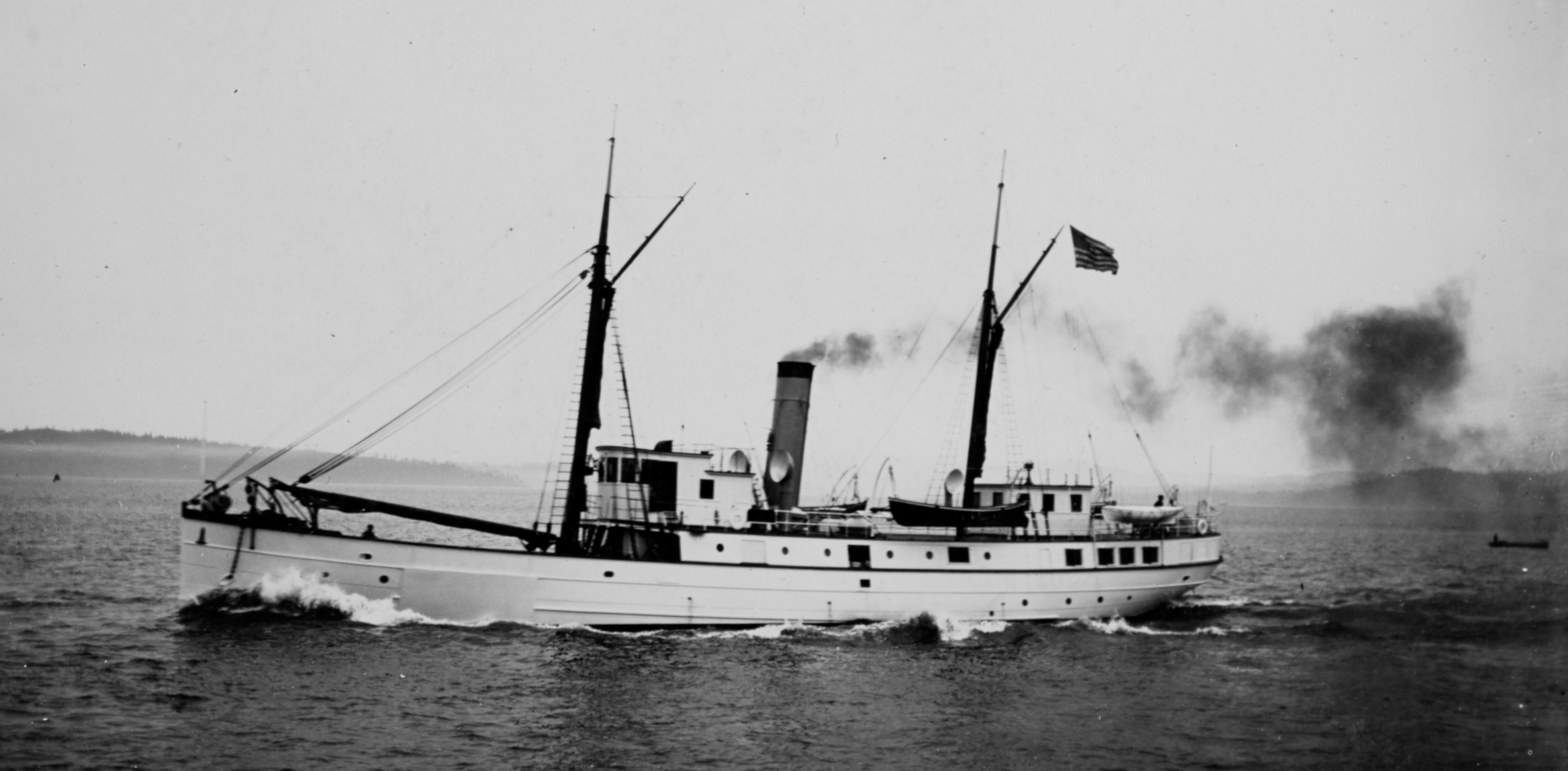
- USLHT Columbine in 1894

History

United States
- Name: Columbine
- Operator: US Lighthouse Service (1892-1917); US Navy (1917-1919); US Lighthouse Service (1919-1927)
- Builder: Globe Iron Works
- Launched: August 1892
- Identification: Signal letters: GVNP; Radio Call sign: NLL (1915)
- Fate: Sold, July 1927

United States
- Name: Columbine
- Owner: Union Shipbuilding Co.
- Identification: Official Number 227053; Signal Letters WQBF
- Fate: Likely scrapped in 1942

General characteristics
- Displacement: 643 tons, fully loaded
- Length: 155 ft (47 m)
- Beam: 26 ft 6 in (8.08 m)
- Draft: 12 ft 3 in (3.73 m), fully loaded
- Depth of hold: 12 ft 4 in (3.76 m)
- Speed: 13 knots (24 km/h; 15 mph)
- Complement: 5 officers, 16 men in 1909

USLHT Columbine was a steel-hulled steamship built as a lighthouse tender in 1892. During her career in the United States Lighthouse Service she was based in Portland, Oregon, Ketchikan, Alaska, Honolulu, Hawaii, San Juan Puerto Rico, and Baltimore, Maryland. During World War I she was transferred to the United States Navy and became USS Columbine. She returned to the Lighthouse Service in 1919. The ship was decommissioned and sold by the in 1927.

The Union Shipbuilding Company of Baltimore, Maryland bought Columbine from the Lighthouse Service. It used her in its ship breaking business. During her career with Union Shipbuilding, she towed nearly 200 ships, including battleships, ocean liners, and freighters to Baltimore for scrapping. She was likely scrapped herself in 1942.

== Construction and characteristics ==
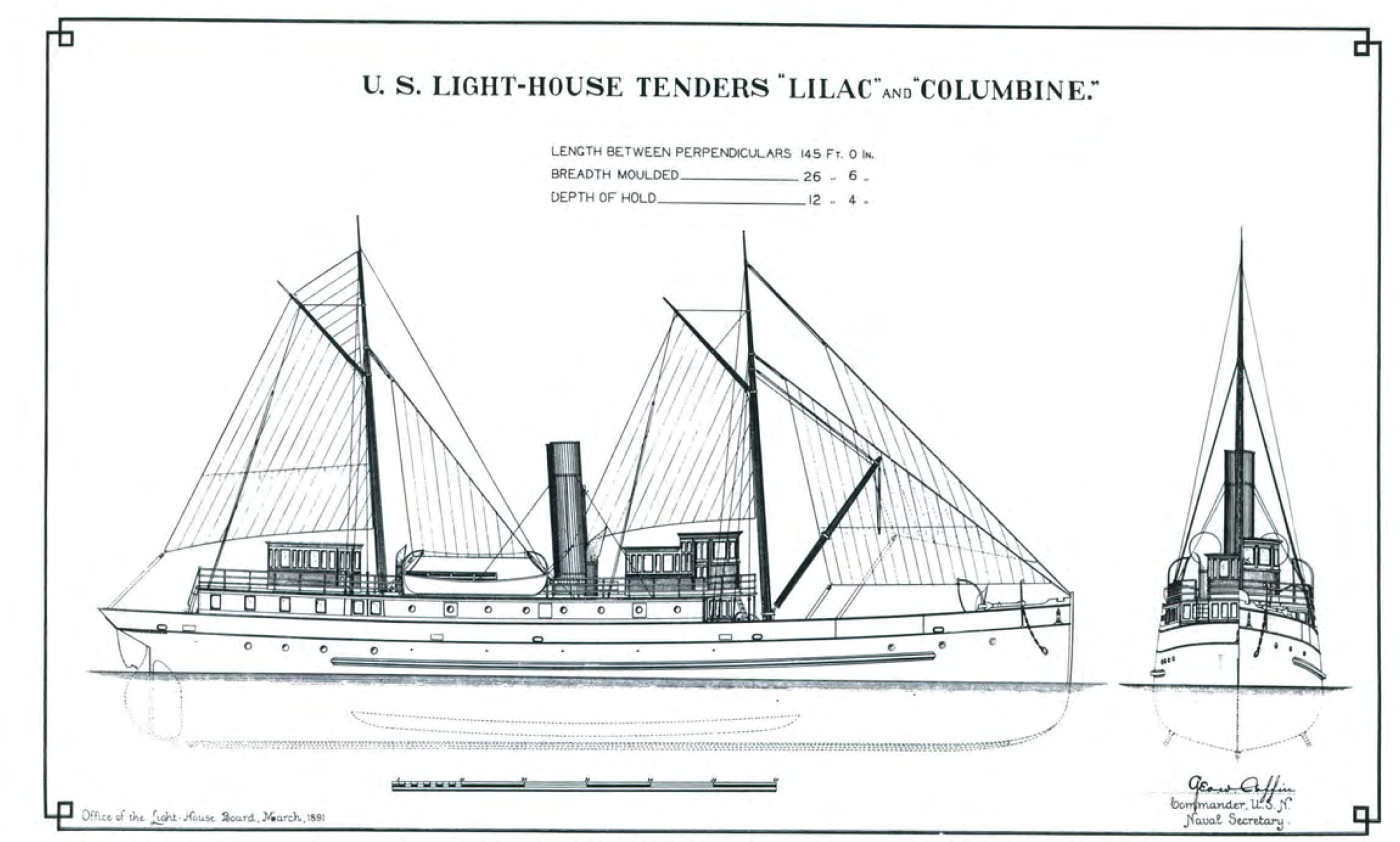
Lighthouse Board plan for Columbine

In 1888, the 13th Lighthouse District encompassed the coasts of Oregon, including the Columbia River, Washington, including the Strait of Juan de Fuca, and Puget Sound, and Alaska. The district had one tender, USLHT Manzanita, to construct, maintain, and supply all the lighthouses and buoys along thousands of miles of coastline in the largest Lighthouse District. In its annual report in 1889, the Lighthouse Board noted that this single ship was not able to visit each buoy twice a year as required by its own regulations, and that routine supply operations had to be contracted to commercial shippers which were expensive and not always available. It requested funding to build a new tender for the district. On 30 September 1890, Congress passed an appropriation of $95,000 each for identical tenders in the 1st and 13th Lighthouse Districts.

Bids for sisterships USLHT Lilac and USLHT Columbine were opened at the Treasury Department on 23 April 1891. There were fourteen bidders, of which Globe Iron Works of Cleveland, Ohio was the lowest on both vessels. Globe Iron Works bid $77,850 each to build the two ships. The Pennsylvania Steel Company of Sparrows Point, Maryland bid $80,000 on Columbine, and $80,300 on Lilac, but wrote in pen, on the edge of the printed bid form, that it would build both ships for $155,000. Since this amount was $700 less than the Globe Iron Works bids taken together, controversy ensued. Globe Iron Works corporate secretary, Luther Allen, met with U.S. Treasury Secretary Charles Foster, previously governor of Ohio, to argue that the Lighthouse Board had not called for a joint bid and thus it would be illegal to consider the Maryland company's joint bid. Allen won the argument. Globe Iron Works was notified that it had been awarded the contract for both ships on 28 April 1891. U.S. Navy Commander Charles V. Gridley was sent to Cleveland to oversee the construction of the two ships for the Lighthouse Board.

Columbine's hull and bulwarks were constructed of mild-steel plating riveted together. She was built with a double bottom and 12 water-tight compartments as safety measures against flooding due to accidental grounding. She was 155 feet (47 m) long overall (145 feet (44 m) between perpendiculars), with a beam of 26 feet 6 inches (8.08 m) and a depth of hold of 12 feet 4 inches (3.76 m). Columbine's draft, when fully loaded, was 12 feet 3 inches (3.73 m). Her fully loaded displacement was 643 tons, and her light displacement was 429 tons.

She had two Norway pine masts and was schooner-rigged for sailing. The foremast was equipped with a wooden boom that allowed it to be used as a derrick to hoist buoys aboard. A separate steam-powered winch drove the hoist.

Columbine had a single propeller 9 feet 4 inches (2.84 m) in diameter. She had a single inverted-cylinder, surface-condensing steam engine to drive the propeller. It had two cylinders of 22 and 41 inches in diameter with a stroke of 30 inches. The engine had an indicated horsepower of 800. Steam was provided by two cylindrical coal-fired boilers, each of which was 10 feet 9 inches (3.28 m) long and 10 feet 8 inches (3.25 m) in diameter.

Running from bow to stern on the lower deck were a fore-peak storeroom, crew quarters including 12 berths, lockers, wardrobes and wash basins, the cargo hold, the coal bunkers, boiler room, and engine room. Aft of the engine room were crew quarters with another 12 berths, a pantry, and another storeroom. On the main deck forward was a room for two small steam engines to lift the anchors and run a windlass, and at the stern of the ship a room for the steam-powered steering equipment. The open buoy deck was forward of the deckhouse on the main deck. The deckhouse contained the Inspector's quarters, which consisted of two staterooms, a panty, and bathroom, three staterooms for the ship's officers, the galley, saloon, and a storeroom. The second level of the deckhouse contained the pilothouse and captain's stateroom forward, and another stateroom aft. The ship had steam heating. There were two 500 U.S. gallons (1,900 L) potable water tanks.

The ship was equipped with electric power generation and lights when she was built at Globe Iron Works. She had a radio installed in 1915.

Columbine's original cost was $93,993.

The ship's complement varied over the years. In 1917 it consisted of 6 officers and 19 crewmen.

United States buoy tenders are traditionally named for trees, shrubs, and flowering plants. Columbine is named for the Columbine, a genus of flowering plants. She was the first lighthouse tender named Columbine, but not the last. A second USLHT Columbine was launched in 1931.

Columbine was launched in August 1892. She sailed from Cleveland on 5 September 1892, bound for the general lighthouse depot at Thompkinsville, Staten Island, New York. While proceeding south in the East River, Columbine went aground. The ship was undamaged, but the pilot aboard lost his license.

== Government service (1892-1925) ==
=== US Lighthouse Service, 13th District (1892-1910) ===
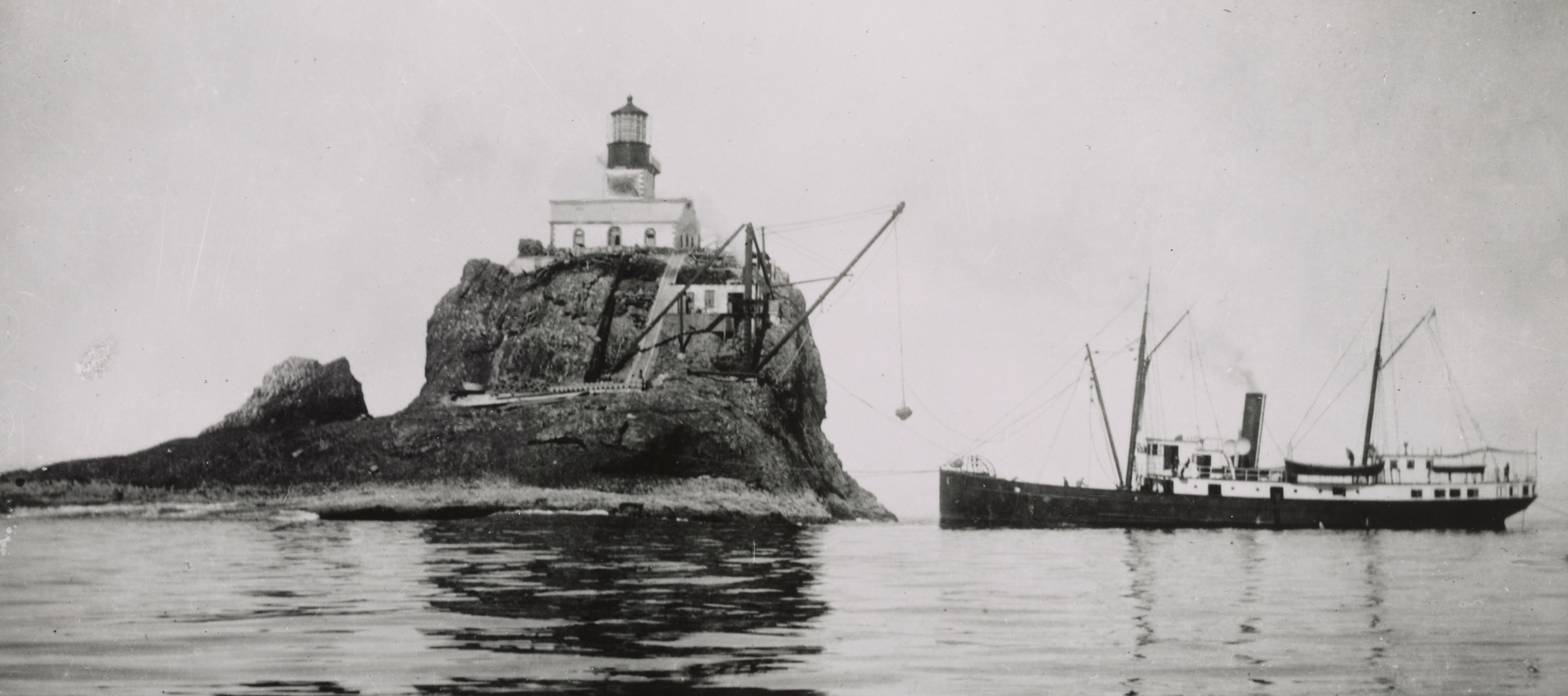
Columbine unloading construction materials at the Tillamook, Oregon lighthouse

Columbine first sailed in the fleet of the U.S. Lighthouse Board, a bureau of the U.S. Department of the Treasury. In this quasi-military organization, each Lighthouse District had an Inspector, typically a Naval officer, and an Engineer, typically an officer from the Army Corps of Engineers. While the Engineer was primarily responsible for the construction and maintenance of lighthouses, piers, and other structures, the Inspector was primarily responsible for supplying lighthouses and lightships, and maintaining buoys and lightships in their assigned locations. In her first assignment, Columbine supported the Inspector of the 13th Lighthouse District, based at Portland, Oregon. To support the Inspector, however, she had to get to Portland.

Columbine sailed from New York on 30 October 1892. Since the Panama Canal was still in the future, she made her way to the Pacific via the Strait of Magellan. There were several stops along the way for coal and provisions. Columbine arrived at Bahia, Brazil on 19 November 1892. She stopped at Montevideo, Valparaiso, and Callao finally arriving in San Francisco on 28 January 1893. She underwent numerous repairs in San Francisco to fix both the issues with her original construction, and the wear and tear of her long voyage from Cleveland. She was repainted, as her white hull showed a great deal of rust. A new propeller was fitted with a greater pitch in hopes of greater fuel efficiency. The drafts and grates of her furnaces were modified to improve the efficiency of her coal burning. She was dry-docked to clean the marine growth from her bottom. Before leaving the Bay Area, Columbine boarded a cargo of 200 tons of buoy mooring chain at the Mare Island Navy Yard to take with her to her new assignment. Columbine finally reached her base in Portland on 21 April 1893.

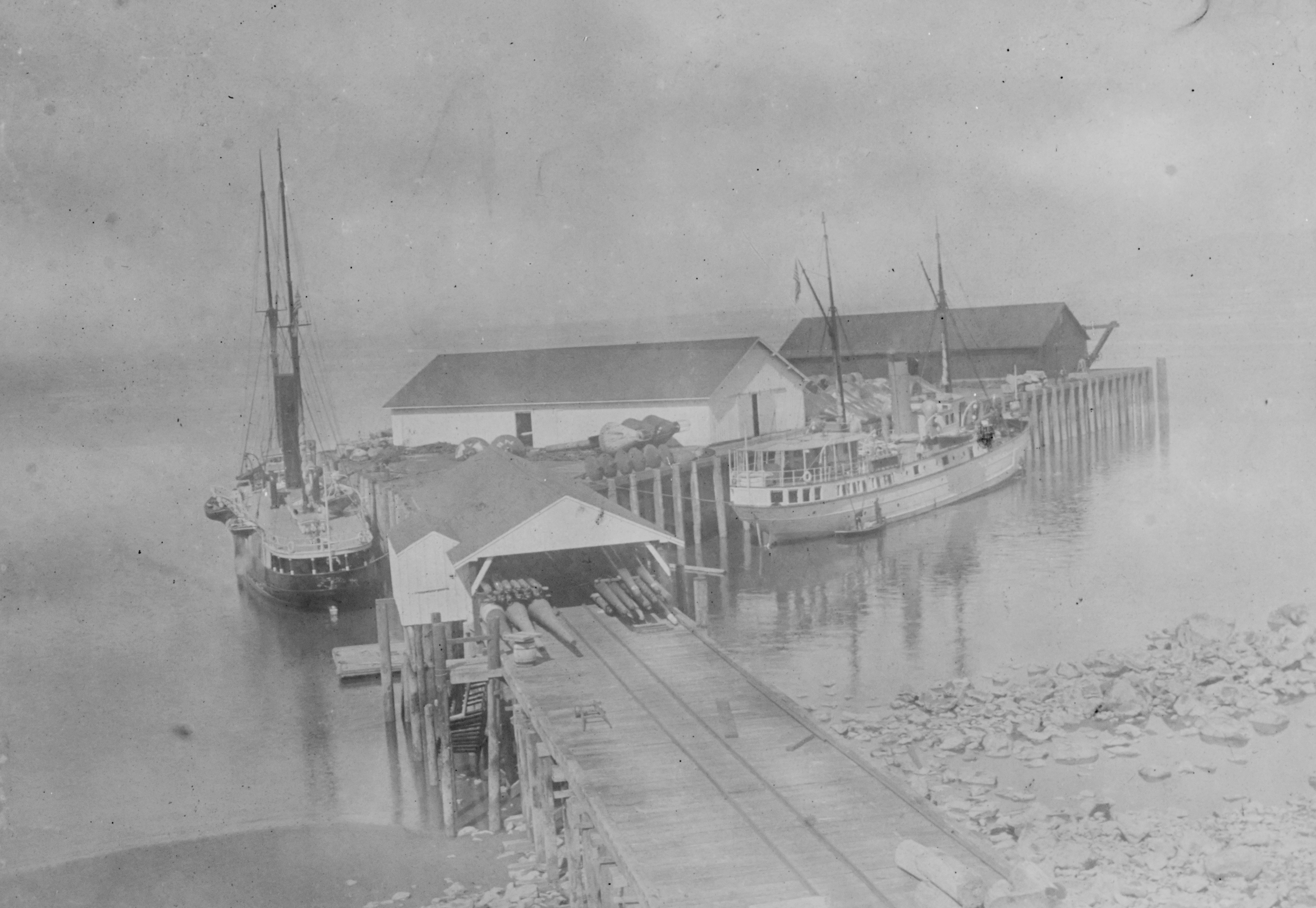
Columbine, right, and USLHT Manzanita at the lighthouse depot in Astoria, Oregon in 1894

Supporting the District Inspector, Columbine had a number of missions. She placed new buoys, cleaned and maintained existing buoys, reset buoys that were moved off-station by storms and removed buoys that were worn out. In one of her first working trips for the 13th Lighthouse District, for example, she sailed for Southeast Alaska on 26 May 1893. In a 25-day round trip she placed 12 new buoys, cleaned and painted 47 buoys, and repaired 12 beacons. Columbine towed lightships, including Light Vessel 50, into position and back to port for maintenance. She was also used to deliver food, water, wood, coal, lantern fuel, and other supplies to lighthouses and lightships. In 1894, for instance, she delivered 150 tons of coal, 13,000 board feet of lumber, and about 200 tons of other material.

In 1895 a larger propeller was installed in a further effort to improve fuel efficiency.

On 1 January 1897 Columbine was transferred from the Inspector to the Engineer of the 13th Lighthouse District. Her primary mission became the construction and maintenance of lighthouses, fog signals, and related civil works. She continued to tend some buoys and deliver some supplies for the Inspector.

In June 1898, Columbine hosted Rear Admiral John G. Walker, chairman of the Lighthouse Board, on an inspection trip of Southeast Alaska. The ship reached 59° 29′ north latitude, the furthest north any lighthouse tender had sailed at the time. This was considered remarkable, but also implied that there were no maintained aids to navigation on the entire Alaskan coast north of the panhandle. Also notable on this trip was that the first navigation beacon in Alaska was erected. This was a modest light on Castle Hill in Sitka. A similar inspection trip took place aboard Columbine in 1899 when Brigadier General John M. Wilson, Chief of Engineers of the United States Army, inspected army installations on Puget Sound.

In August 1896 gold was discovered in the Klondike. Tens of thousands of would-be prospectors sailed up the Inside Passage to begin their trek to the gold fields. Noting that there were only 58 buoys in all of Alaska to guide the influx of marine traffic, in 1898 the Lighthouse Board recommended that Congress appropriate $100,000 for a new tender to focus on Alaska. Later that year, gold was discovered in Nome, creating an increase in Alaskan ship traffic in an area where there were no aids to navigation at all. In the summer of 1900, Columbine's annual trip to Alaska was notable for two reasons. First, Alaska was of sufficient priority that both the Inspector and Engineer of the 13th District were aboard. Second, Columbine reached Dutch Harbor, the first Lighthouse Service vessel to reach the Aleutians.

In 1903, the Lighthouse Board was transferred to the newly created U.S. Department of Commerce and Labor. Since the Lighthouse Board still had operational control of the U.S. Lighthouse Service, little changed in Columbine's operations.

=== US Lighthouse Service, 16th District (1910–1915) ===
In 1910, Congress abolished the Lighthouse Board and replaced it with the all-civilian Lighthouse Bureau of the Department of Commerce and Labor. This change did impact the ship's work in that District Inspectors and Engineers were replaced by a single District Superintendent. All ships did any construction, maintenance, or buoy tending they were assigned. As part of this reorganization, Alaska was split from the 13th District and became a separate Lighthouse District, the 16th. Columbine was assigned to the new district, and based in Ketchikan.

Since USLHT Armeria was wrecked in May 1912 off Hinchinbrook Island, Columbine was the only tender permanently assigned to Alaska during much of her time there. Her efforts were supplemented on occasion with vessels chartered by the district. She placed and maintained buoys from Southeast Alaska to Dutch Harbor. She delivered supplies to lighthouses including Scotch Cap Light, Eldred Rock Light, Sentinel Island Light, and Five Fingers Light. In 1914 she made the initial surveys for the construction of the Cape St. Elias Light.

=== US Lighthouse Service, 19th District (1915–1917) ===
On 2 February 1915, Columbine sailed from Ketchikan, bound for San Francisco, where she arrived on 15 February 1915. There, she went into the shipyard for repairs. At San Francisco she swapped crews and missions with USLHT Kukui, which was judged to be more capable of withstanding the rigors of Alaska. On 12 May 1915 Columbine sailed for Honolulu to replace Kukui, but with Kukui's former crew. She arrived at her new base on 20 May 1915.

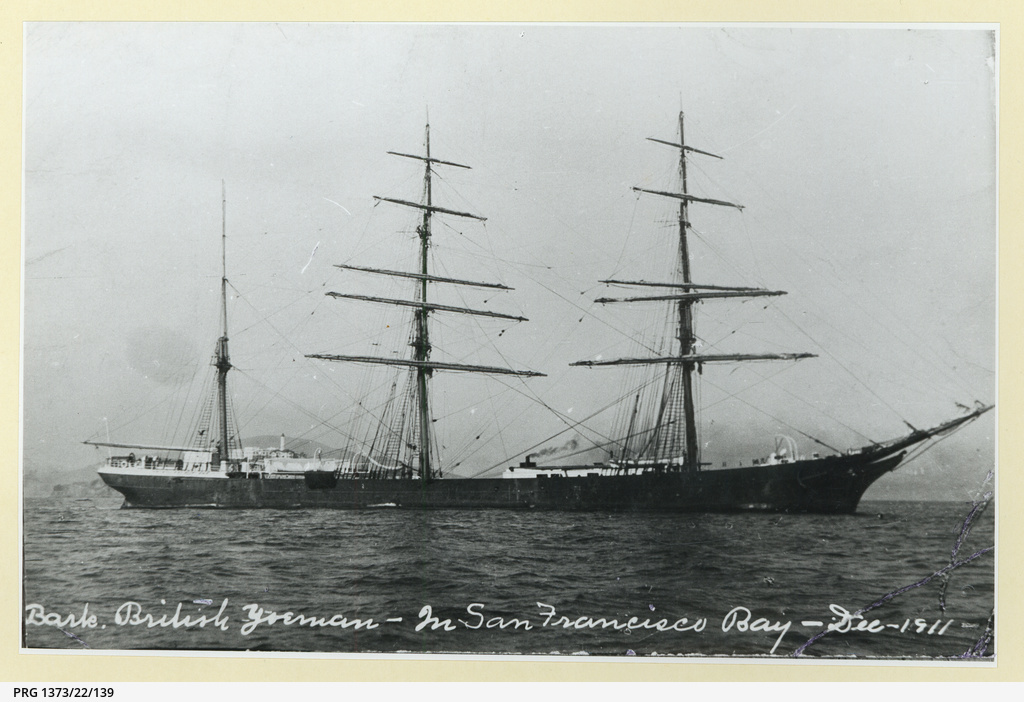
British Yeoman in 1911, prior to her rescue by Columbine

On 17 January 1916, the barquentine British Yeoman anchored off Port Allen, Kauai as a Kona storm began to lash the area. Her anchor drug in the wind and she was driven toward the beach. Her stern hit the reef at least nine times jamming her rudder. Columbine, on the other side of the island at Kilauea, received a radiogram warning of trouble at Port Allen and went to help. Using one of her ship's boats, Columbine managed to pass a hawser to British Yeoman and began to tow her away from the shore. Progress was fitful. While Columbine was able to tow the much larger ship far enough offshore to prevent her from being destroyed, the towing cable parted in the high winds and seas. Once the line broke, British Yeoman was adrift until a new line could be rigged. Ultimately, five towing cables were rigged, one after the other, as each of the previous lines broke. The fifth cable was the last aboard either of the two ships, so when it broke, Columbine radioed for assistance. The Navy tug USS Navajo was dispatched from Oahu. She managed to tow the disabled ship into port after overcoming additional challenges. When Columbine was finally able to anchor, her crew had been at their stations for 55 hours.

Praise for Columbine's role in the rescue was effusive. President Woodrow Wilson wrote to Commerce Secretary William C. Redfield, "Thank you for letting me see the report of the heroic services of the officers and crew of the Columbine. I have read it with quickening pulse. If you have the opportunity, will you not convey to these men my personal congratulations?" The Secretary complied, and wrote a letter of commendation to the crew that stated, in part:

I take special pleasure in commending you for your gratifying exhibition of seamanship in connection with this rescue, and also desire to express my high appreciation for the services of all on board during the rescue, in which the best traditions of the Lighthouse Service have been upheld so well.

=== US Navy (1917-1919) ===
On 11 April 1917 President Wilson issued Executive Order 2588 transferring a number of lighthouse tenders to support the American effort in World War I. Columbine was transferred to the United States Navy. She was commissioned as USS Columbine, the second U.S. naval vessel of that name.

During her Navy service Columbine and Kukui swapped back to their original missions, with Kukui going to Hawaii and Columbine to Alaska. By January 1918 Columbine was in Portland, Oregon for repairs, and shortly after back to Alaska. On 8 May 1918 she sailed from Astoria, Oregon for Baltimore, to which she had been transferred. There she was responsible for placing and removing submarine nets for the 5th Naval District.

After the war, on 1 July 1919, the components of the Lighthouse Service which had become part of the Navy were returned to the supervision of the Department of Commerce. Columbine was struck from the Navy List.

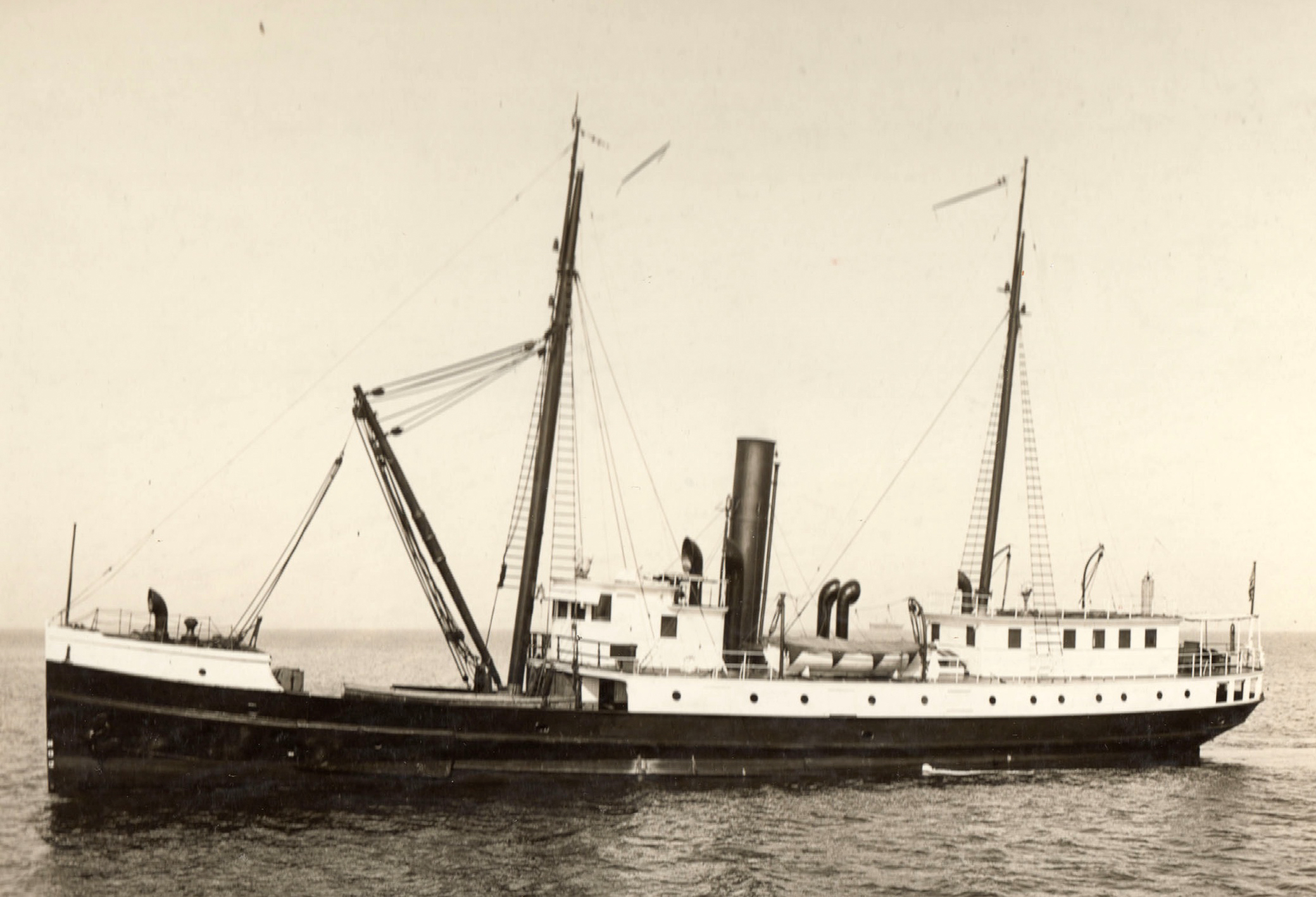
Columbine in 1922

=== US Lighthousse Service, 5th District (1919–1924) ===
After her Navy service, Columbine was given a major refit to repair damage and modernize the ship. The work was begun on 26 November 1919 and was completed on 5 May 1920 at a cost of $54,556.

Columbine was laid up in February 1923. She was replaced in the 5th District by USLHT Speedwell.

=== US Lighthouse Service, 9th District (1924-1927) ===
In June 1924, the Lighthouse Service announced that Columbine would be reactivated and sent to the 9th District to replace her sistership USLHT Lilac. Lilac's crew took possession of Columbine and departed Portsmouth, Virginia on 31 October 1924 to sail her to San Juan, where she arrived in November 1924.

During the evening of 6 November 1925 the U.S. Coast Guard patrol boat 245 was attempting to enter San Juan Harbor in heavy seas when one of her crew fell overboard. His shipmates threw him a line which tangled in the boast's propeller rendering her helpless. Columbine came to the boat's rescue, and despite the seas, managed to save all seven of the boat's crew. Columbine's captain, Norman C. Manyon, received the gold lifesaving medal for his heroism.

On 26 December 1926, the Cunard liner RMS Franconia went hard aground at the entrance to San Juan Harbor. Columbine assisted in refloating the ship.

=== Disposal of Columbine ===
Columbine arrived at Portsmouth, Virginia on 8 April 1927. Her crew was transferred to USLHT Acacia who sailed her to San Juan to replace Columbine. She was sold through a sealed bid process. Bids were opened on 22 July 1927 by the Superintendent of the 5th Lighthouse District. The ship was purchased by the Union Shipbuilding Company of Baltimore, Maryland.

== Union Shipbuilding Company service (1927-1942) ==
Union Shipbuilding Company used Columbine in its ship breaking and salvage business. Over the course of her career with Union Shipbuilding, she towed 196 ships to the company's salvage yard in Baltimore to be broken up. These ships came from a variety of East and Gulf-coast ports, many under large contracts with the U.S. Shipping Board to dispose of unneeded ships remaining from its activities in World War I.

In December 1929, the passenger liners RMS Fort Victoria and Algonquin collided near the Ambrose lightship outside of New York Harbor. Columbine was nearby at the time, towing ex-USS Polar Bear to Baltimore for salvage. She answered the SOS calls from the two ships and rescued the last 18 people aboard Fort Victoria as she sank, including her captain and pilot.

In 1932, Columbine was chartered to locate the wreck of HMS Braak, which sank in Delaware Bay in 1798. The hope was that the wreck might contain $40 million of treasure.

Columbine was abandoned, likely scrapped, in 1942.

Partial list of Columbine tows to Union Shipbuilding breaking yard
| Ship | Date of Tow | Type |
|---|---|---|
| Betsy Bell Chicomico Hawarden Haxtum Quillwark | 1930 1931 1930 1930 1929 | U.S. Shipping Board Design 1015 freighter |
| Ossawatomie Worcester | 1929 1930 | U.S. Shipping Board Design 1016 freighter |
| Norumbega | 1931 | U.S. Shipping Board Design 1019 freighter |
| Des Moines Bridge Hico Knoxville Louisville Bridge Phoenix Bridge Virginia Bridge | 1929 | U.S. Shipping Board Design 1023 freighter |
| Intan City of Sherman City of Vernon | 1931 | U.S. Shipping Board Design 1025 freighter |
| Lake Elkwood Lake Fiscus Lake Ganado | 1930 | U.S. Shipping Board Design 1074 freighter |
| Franklin County Lake Farragut Lake Fibre Lake Geyser Lake Gilta McCreary County | 1931 1930 1930 1931 1931 1931 | U.S. Shipping Board Design 1099 freighter |
| ex- USS North Dakota ex- USS Cleveland ex- USS Des Moines ex- USS Powhatan ex- USS Dixie ex- USS Polar Bear ex- USS Polar Star ex- USS Western Sea ex- USS Zirkel | 1931 1930 1930 1928 1928 1929 1929 1931 1929 | Delaware-class battleship Denver-class cruiser Denver-class cruiser Troop transport Destroyer tender Refrigerated freighter Refrigerated freighter Design 1013 freighter Design 1015 freighter |
| Apache Northland | 1928 1934 | Clyde Line passenger ship Eastern Steamship Co. passenger ship |
