= Zirkel =

Zirkel may refer to:

== Surname ==
- Albert Zirkel (1885–?), American wrestler who competed in the 1904 Summer Olympics
- Ferdinand Zirkel (1838–1912), German geologist and petrographer

== Other ==
- Dorsum Zirkel, a wrinkle ridge in Mare Imbrium on the Moon
- Mount Zirkel, in the Rocky Mountains of Colorado
- USS Zirkel (ID-3407), a cargo ship that served in the United States Navy from 1918 to 1919
- Zirkel (Studentenverbindung), a monogram symbol used in European student societies (Studentenverbindung)
