= USLHT Armeria =

United States lighthouse tender

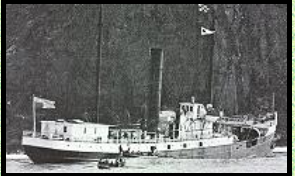
- USLHT Armeria after she was wrecked on a submerged rock in May 1912. She is flying the United States flag upside down as a distress signal.

History

United States Lighthouse Service
- Name: USLHT Armeria
- Builder: Dialogue & Company
- Cost: $178,930.09
- Launched: 19 August 1890
- Fate: Transferred to US Navy 24 March 1898

United States Navy
- Name: USS Armeria
- Fate: Transferred to U.S. Lighthouse Service 16 September 1898

United States Lighthouse Service
- Name: USLHT Armeria
- Identification: Signal Letters GVNL
- Fate: Wrecked 20 May 1912

General characteristics
- Tonnage: 1,052 gross; 632 net
- Displacement: 1,475 long tons (1,499 t)
- Length: 211 ft (64 m)
- Beam: 34 ft 9 in (10.59 m)
- Draft: 13 ft 4 in (4.06 m)
- Propulsion: Two 600-horsepower compound steam engines driving two propellers
- Sail plan: Schooner rig
- Speed: 13 knots
- Complement: 36 in 1909
- Armament: 2 guns (during U.S. Navy service)

USLHT Armeria was a lighthouse tender built for the United States Lighthouse Board in 1890. She served as the supply tender for all the light stations on the Atlantic and Gulf Coasts until 1906 when she was transferred to the West Coast. There she became an inspection tender, providing supplies and routine maintenance to buoys, lighthouses, and light ships. In May 1912, while landing supplies at the Cape Hinchinbrook Light at the entrance to Prince William Sound, Alaska, Armeria struck a submerged rock pillar and was wrecked.

During six months in 1898, the ship was loaned to the United States Navy and was commissioned as USS Armeria. Her participation in the Spanish-American War included two sailings to Cuba as an ammunition ship, delivering large-caliber shells, gunpowder, and other supplies to the combatant ships of the fleet.

== Construction and characteristics ==
USLHT Fern delivered fuel, food, and other supplies to remote lighthouses along the entire Atlantic and Gulf Coasts of the United States. By 1882, the growth in her workload was so great that she could not complete even half the required deliveries. The Lighthouse Board sought funding from Congress to build a much larger supply tender. It responded by appropriating $147,500 on 3 March 1887, and $32,000 on 2 October 1888 for a replacement supply steamer for the Atlantic and Gulf Coasts.

The Lighthouse Board advertised for proposals to build Armeria in October 1888, with bids to be opened on 20 November 1888. Four bids were submitted. John H. Dialogue's was the lowest at $171,000, and he was awarded the contract to build the ship on 6 February 1889. She was built at the Dialogue & Company shipyard on the Delaware River in Camden, New Jersey.

Armeria's hull was built of mild steel plates, riveted together. She was 211 feet (64 m) long overall, 201 ft 8 in (61.47 m) long between perpendiculars, with a beam of 34 ft 9 in (10.59 m), and a fully-loaded draft of 13 ft 4 in (4.06 m). Her depth of hold was 17 feet 7 inches (5.36 m). She displaced 1,475 tons. Her gross register tonnage was 1,052, and her net register tonnage was 632.

She had two compound steam engines, whose high and low pressure cylinders had diameters of 22 and 40 inches, with strokes of 30 and 36 inches. These drove two four-bladed propellers which were 9 feet 8 inches (2.95 m) in diameter. Steam for the engines was provided by two coal-fired Scotch boilers which were 14.25 feet (4.34 m) in diameter and 10.5 feet (3.2 m) long. The indicated horsepower of the two engines together was 1,200.

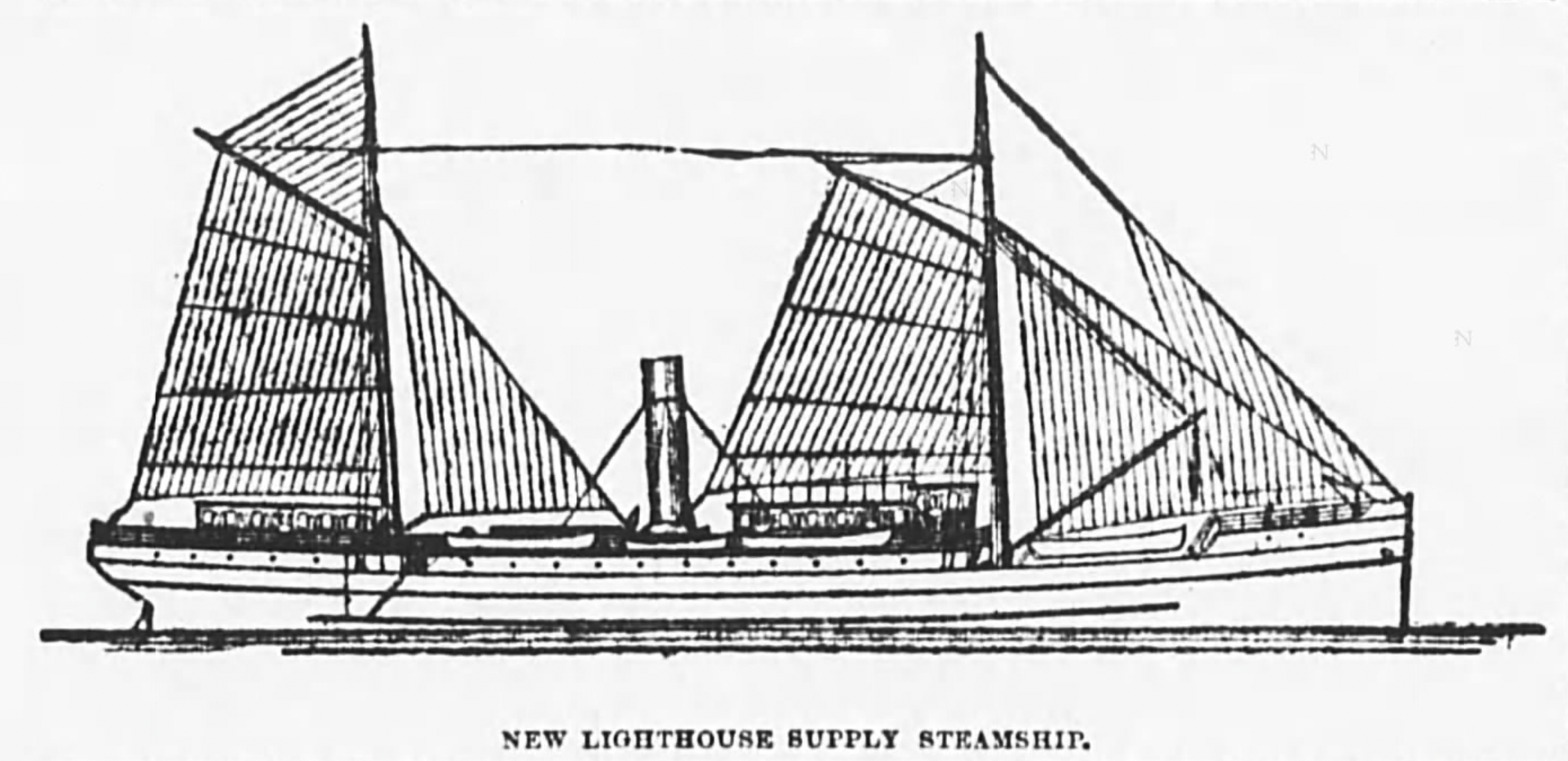
Sail plan for Armeria published in 1890

Armeria had two masts, and was rigged to sail as a schooner. The forward mast was also used as a derrick to load and unload cargo, and to lift buoys on deck for maintenance.

In 1909 her complement was 7 officers and 29 men.

Over the course of her career, Armeria received a number of enhancements. in 1892 she was equipped with a steam-powered generator and electric lights. During repairs at Heffernan Engine Works in Seattle in 1910, a skylight was installed over the wardroom, and a new washroom was built for the crew.

Armeria was Launched on 19 August 1890. She was christened by Miss Adelaide Dialogue, daughter of her builder. Her sea trial took place on 2 December 1890. On this trip she sailed from Camden to the Lighthouse Depot at Staten Island, New York. She achieved a speed of 13 knots. She was accepted by the Lighthouse Service on 5 December 1890.

Armeria's namesake was a flower, as was customary for the Lighthouse Service. The genus Armeria includes the Sea Pink, a common beach flower.

== Service history ==
=== U.S. Lighthouse Service (1890–1898) ===
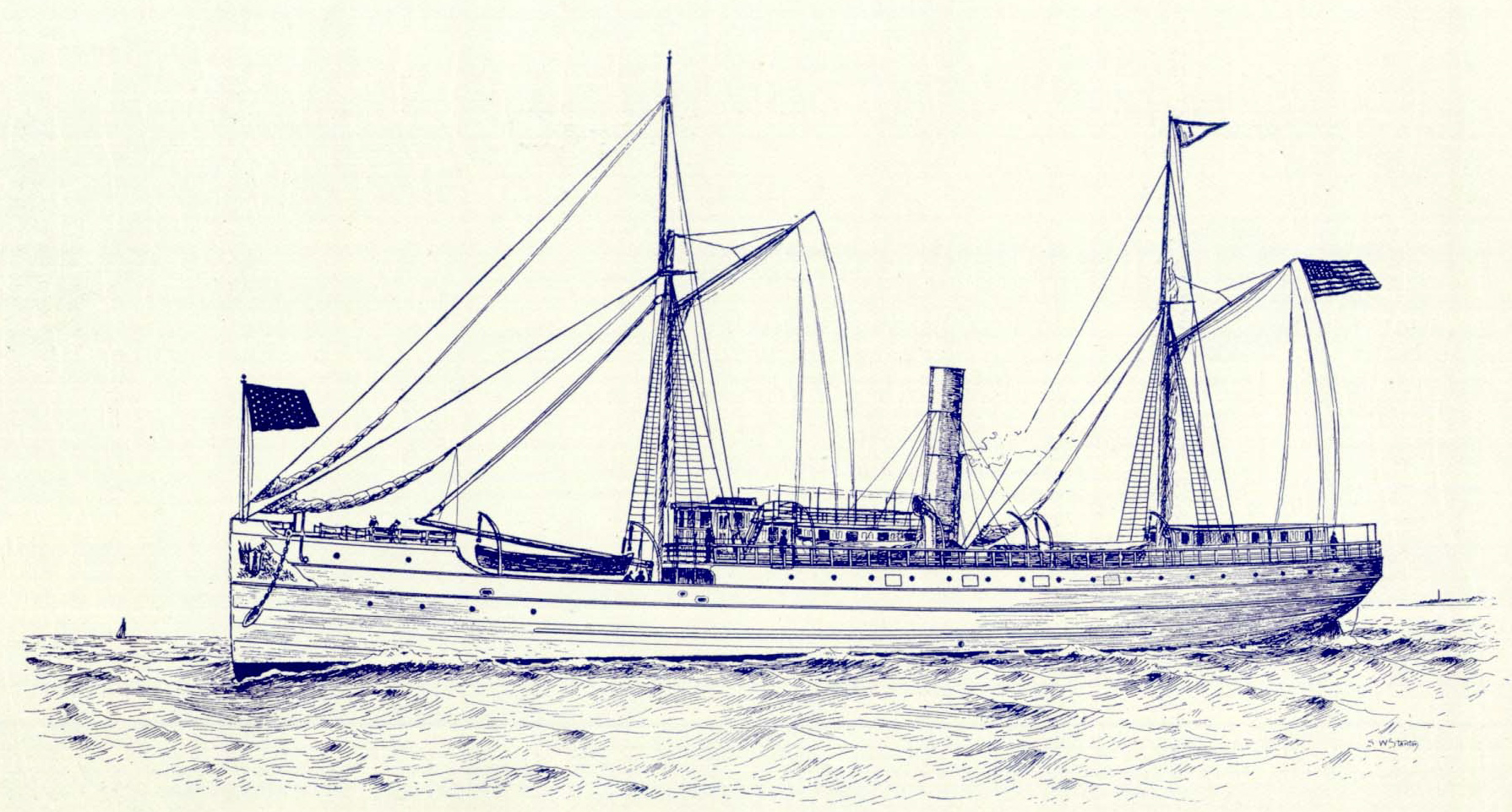
Armeria, ca. 1893

Armeria was assigned to the 3rd Lighthouse District, with her home port at New York City. Immediately after she was accepted, a full Lighthouse Service crew was put on board, and she was loaded with supplies. She left on her first work trip on 22 December 1890 and returned on 16 March 1891. Her second voyage lasted from mid-April to mid-June 1891. During these two trips she supplied all the light stations from Elbow Beacon, New Jersey to Point Isabel, Texas. She distributed 187,200 US gallons (709,000 L) of mineral oil to fuel lamps, 150 tons of paint, oils, and turpentine, 1,200 boxes of lantern chimneys, 3,000 packages of "wrapped goods", and 15 tons of miscellaneous supplies. She also carried buoys, chains, sinkers, and other supplies to lighthouse depots along her route.

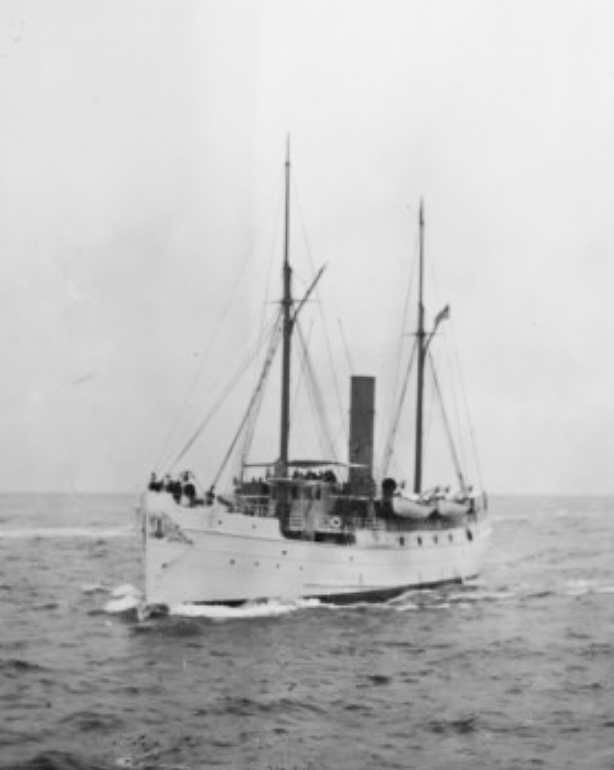
Armeria in 1895

Armeria typically made three long trips per year to reach all the Atlantic and Gulf Coast light stations. To avoid ice conditions, she scheduled the summer months to supply the New England coast.

On 15 August 1897, in heavy fog, Armeria went aground near Deere Isle, Maine. She was refloated with difficulty, and only after much of her cargo had been removed to lighten the ship. She was towed to Bath by USLHT Lilac and USLHT Myrtle. There she was hauled out to have her damage surveyed. The ship was leaking, one propeller was broken, and her boilers had shifted. Repairs were made at Bath Iron Works, which was the low bidder on the work. While in the shipyard, her boilers and machinery were overhauled. She returned to service on 17 October 1897.

=== U.S. Navy (1898) ===
As U.S. relations with Spain deteriorated, Armeria was transferred to the United States Navy on 24 March 1898. She was sent to the Norfolk Navy Yard in Portsmouth, Virginia to be converted for naval service, including the addition of two guns and a coat of Navy gray paint. She arrived there on 15 April 1898. She was commissioned as USS Armeria and was assigned to the North Atlantic Squadron. Her Lighthouse Service officers were replaced by Navy officers. On 25 April 1898, Congress declared war, initiating the Spanish-American War.

Ameria sailed from Norfolk on 30 May 1898 for Key West with a 2,500 tons of naval ammunition, including 13 and 8-inch shells. She arrived there on 4 June 1898. From Key West she sailed to the coast of Cuba, where she replenished the ammunition stores of combatant ships, including USS Indiana. Armeria was operating off the north coast of Cuba on 9 June 1898 with the armed yacht USS Scorpion and the steamer USS Supply when the gunboat USS Eagle misidentified them as a Spanish Navy squadron. Rear Admiral W. T. Sampson correctly "placed no confidence" in this report.

On 28 June 1898, Armeria arrived at the Brooklyn Navy Yard from Key West. There she was loaded with ammunition for Rear Admiral John C. Watson's Eastern Fleet, and sailed again for Key West and Cuba on 14 July 1898. Armeria also carried replacement mounts for 5-inch guns that had been damaged on USS Brooklyn during the Battle of Santiago de Cuba, which were installed at Playa del Este, Cuba. She sailed from there to Key West on 6 August 1898, where she arrived on 9 August. Armeria returned to Newport, Rhode Island from Key West on 25 August 1898. She returned to the Brooklyn Navy Yard four days later, likely to have her guns removed. She was returned to the Lighthouse Service on 16 September 1898.

=== U.S. Lighthouse Service (1898–1912) ===
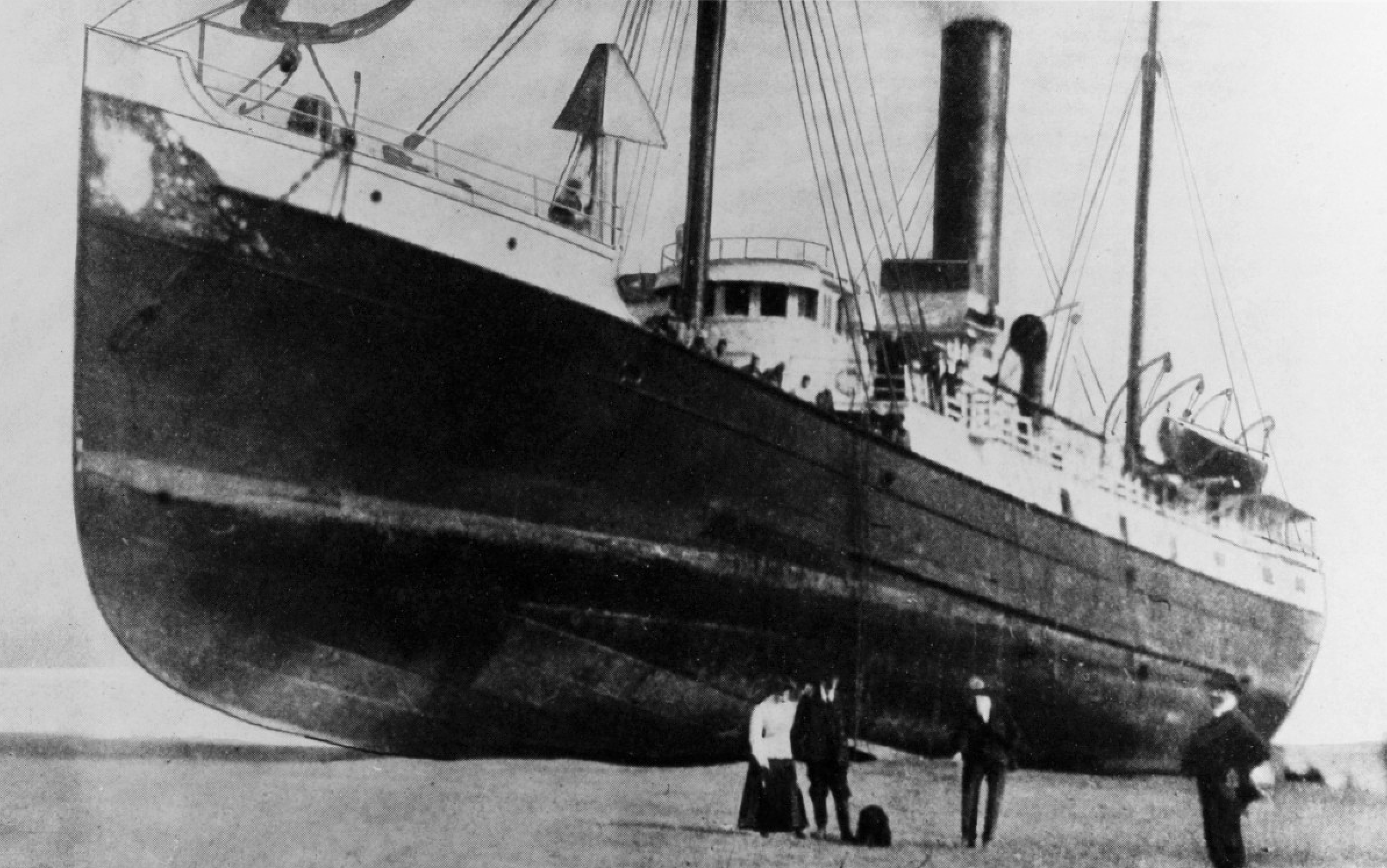
Armeria temporarily aground in Cook Inlet, Alaska, ca.1909

After her return from the Navy, Armeria went to the lighthouse depot on Staten Island to be repaired and readied for service. Among other work, she was repainted white, as was tradition in the Lighthouse Service. Her dynamo, searchlight, and one of her boats were replaced, and various other repairs made at a cost of $16,390, paid for by the Navy. She resumed her duties supplying the Atlantic and Gulf Coast lighthouses.

In the wake of the American acquisition of Puerto Rico in the Spanish-American War, the Lighthouse Board was funded to maintain the aids to navigation around the island. In July 1901, Armeria took the chief clerk of the Lighthouse Board on an inspection tour of the island's lighthouses and buoys, and delivered buoys, chain, and sinkers to the lighthouse depot there.

Due to "exigencies of the service", Armeria was reassigned to the West Coast. The exigency in this case was the loss of USLHT Manzanita, which foundered and sank in the Columbia River on 6 October 1905. Armeria sailed from New York on 24 October 1906 and arrived in San Francisco on 8 January 1907. As part of the 12th Lighthouse District she not only carried supplies to lighthouses, but also acted as an inspection tender, providing routine maintenance to buoys from Alaska to San Diego. In 1908 she was transferred to the 13th Lighthouse District, which then included Oregon, Washington, and Alaska. As part of a 1910 reorganization, Armeria was transferred to the newly-created 16th Lighthouse District, which was reposponsible for aids to navigation in Alaska. She was the largest tender in the service at the time.

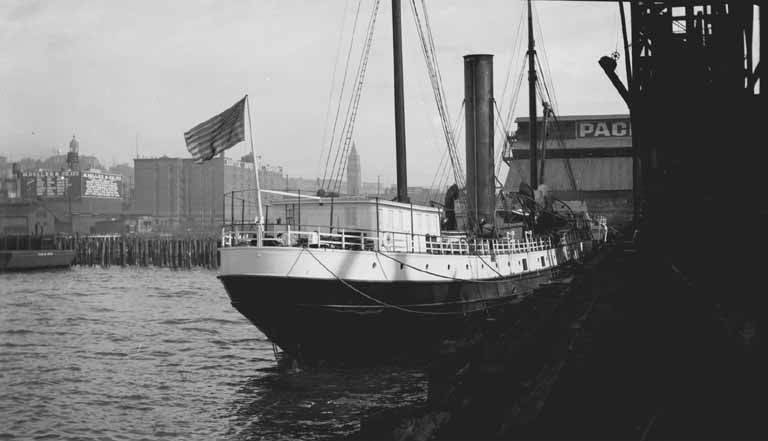
Armeria, moored in Seattle

While in Alaska, Armeria's home port was Ketchikan. In addition to supplying lighthouses, and maintaining buoys, she was involved in a number of projects to expand aids to navigation in the state. Among others, she carried machinery and construction supplies for the Cape Hinchinbrook light at the entrance to Prince William Sound, and built range lights at Cordova. She deployed the first acetylene gas-fueled light buoys in the state.

=== Loss of Armeria (1912) ===
On 17 April 1912, Armeria sailed from Seattle on her regular supply run up the Alaskan coast. She was preceded from Seattle by the tug Pioneer towing the barge Haydn Brown with supplies for the Alaska Whaling Company's station at Akutan in the Aleutian Islands. Having delivered the cargo, Pioneer was towing the empty Haydn Brown south when the two vessels were engulfed in a storm. On 10 May 1912, the captain of Pioneer was forced to cut the towline to Haydn Brown to save his own ship. The barge quickly drifted out of sight. It crashed ashore on Montague Island on 12 May 1912 and broke up. Two of her eight crew made it to shore alive, but only one survived the ordeal, living on canned meat that washed up from the wreck. By happenstance, Armeria arrived at Montague Island to erect a light at Zaikof Point on 17 May 1912 and rescued the sole survivor.

Armeria then proceeded to Cape Hinchinbrook Light to make her regular delivery. She had been at anchor there for almost three days, discharging coal and supplies, when she struck an uncharted submerged rock pillar at 7:15 am on 20 May 1912. Her hull was punctured, but she managed to raise her anchor and steam toward English Bay where she could be beached, protected from the waves rolling in from the Gulf of Alaska. Incoming seawater extinguished her boiler fires, however, and she was run up onto a rocky beach after only two miles. The passenger steamer Admiral Sampson, on her scheduled southbound run from Cordova, witnessed Armeria's distress and launched her own lifeboats to rescue the crew. They and the sole survivor from Haydn Brown were brought to safety at Cordova. In the subsequent investigation, Captain Gregory and his officers were exonerated from responsibility for Armeria's loss.

The Lighthouse Service called for sealed bids to purchase the wreck of Armeria in March 1914. Bids were opened on 15 April 1914. Fred Warner had the high bid of $2,500 and purchased the wreck. He intended to strip the ship of what was left of her cargo, and attempt to refloat her. Warner was able to recover $5,000 worth of material which was shipped to Seattle for sale. Work during the summer of 1914 proved that salvaging the ship was impractical, as her hull had been badly damaged during her months on the rocks.

The loss of Armeria was a blow to the Lighthouse Service and hampered its operations in Alaska. Construction of lights at Cape Spencer and Cape St. Elias were delayed when materials carried by the ship were lost. The Lighthouse Service's first budget request to Congress for fiscal year 1914 was $250,000 to replace Armeria. USLHT Kukui was transferred to the 16th Lighthouse District in 1914 to fill in until a specifically-designed Alaskan tender could be built. Congress authorized $250,000 for USLHT Cedar, Armeria's permanent replacement, which was commissioned in 1917.

== Commemoration ==
In accordance with a proposal by the United States Hydrographic Office, Armeria Point (52°27′09″N 173°26′33″E) on the northwest coast of Agattu Island in the Aleutian Islands was named for Armeria in 1938.
