= USLHT Lilac (1892 ship) =

Tender of the United States Lighthouse Service

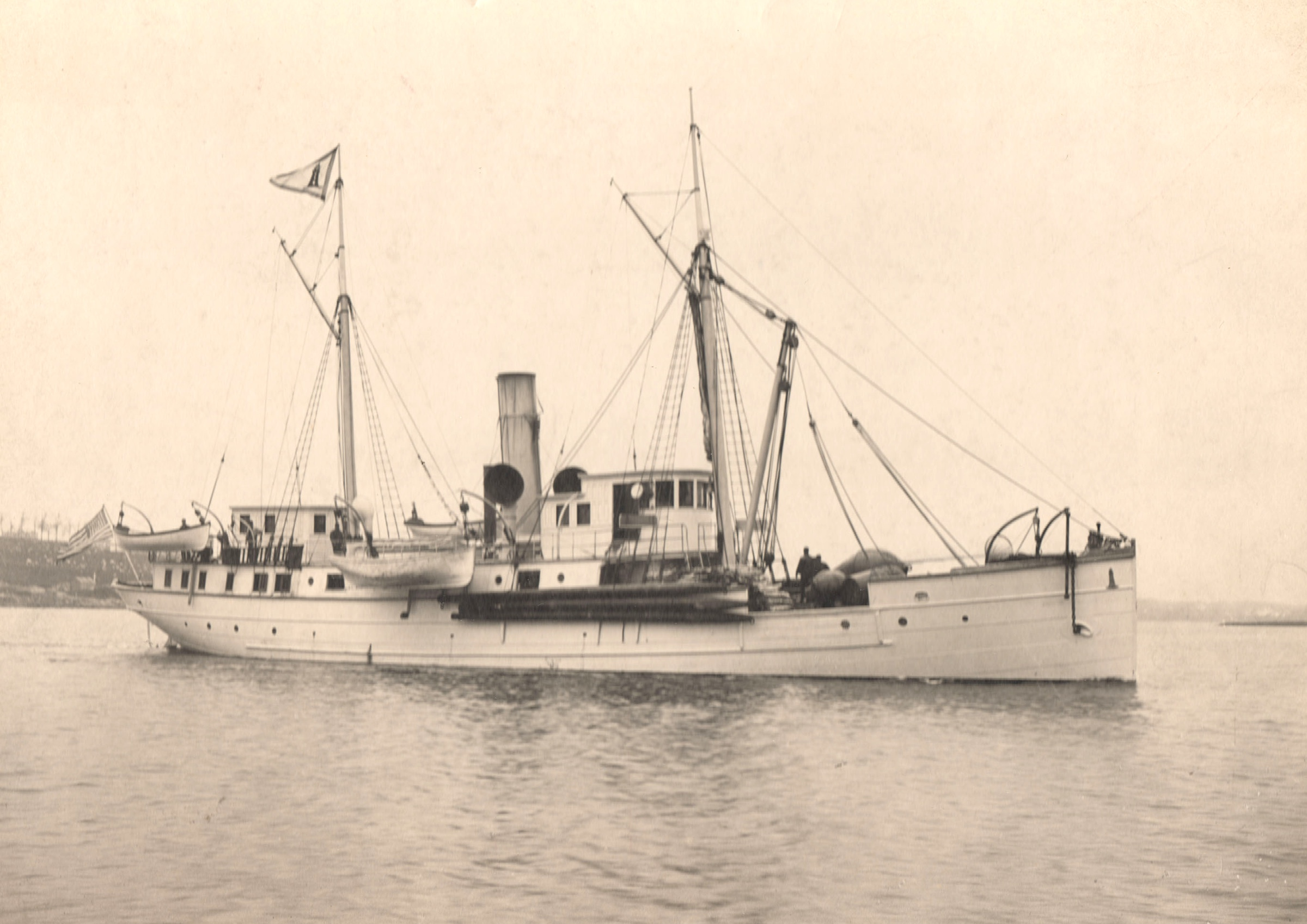
- USLHT Lilac

History

United States
- Name: Lilac
- Operator: US Lighthouse Service (1892-1917); US Navy (1917-1919); US Lighthouse Service (1919-1925)
- Builder: Globe Iron Works Company
- Launched: 30 March 1892
- Commissioned: 3 August 1892
- Decommissioned: 18 November 1924
- Identification: Signal letters: GVNP
- Fate: Sold, April 1925

United States
- Name: Elma
- Owner: Joseph H. Riley (1925-1926); George T. Linton (1926-1930); Robert J. Garlick (1930-1938?)
- Identification: Official Number 224702; Signal Letters MFSJ, KJJD
- Fate: unknown

General characteristics
- Displacement: 643 tons, fully loaded
- Length: 155 ft (47 m)
- Beam: 26 ft 6 in (8.08 m)
- Draft: 12 ft 3 in (3.73 m), fully loaded
- Depth of hold: 12 ft 4 in (3.76 m)
- Speed: 13 knots (24 km/h; 15 mph)
- Complement: 5 officers, 16 men in 1909

USLHT Lilac was a steel-hulled steamship built as a lighthouse tender in 1892. During her career in the United States Lighthouse Service her longest assignments were at Portland, Maine, and San Juan, Puerto Rico. During World War I she was transferred to the United States Navy and became USS Lilac.

After 32 years in government service, the ship was sold to private interests, and her name was changed to Elma. Her first owners ran a bootlegging syndicate, and the ship was used to smuggle liquor into the United States during prohibition. She was confiscated by the U.S. government and sold. During the remainder of her career she was idle much of the time. When she did sail, she carried passengers and freight, was used as a tug to tow other ships, and did various other short-term tasks.

Elma disappears from Federal documentation and newspaper accounts in 1938. Her ultimate fate is unknown.

== Construction and characteristics ==
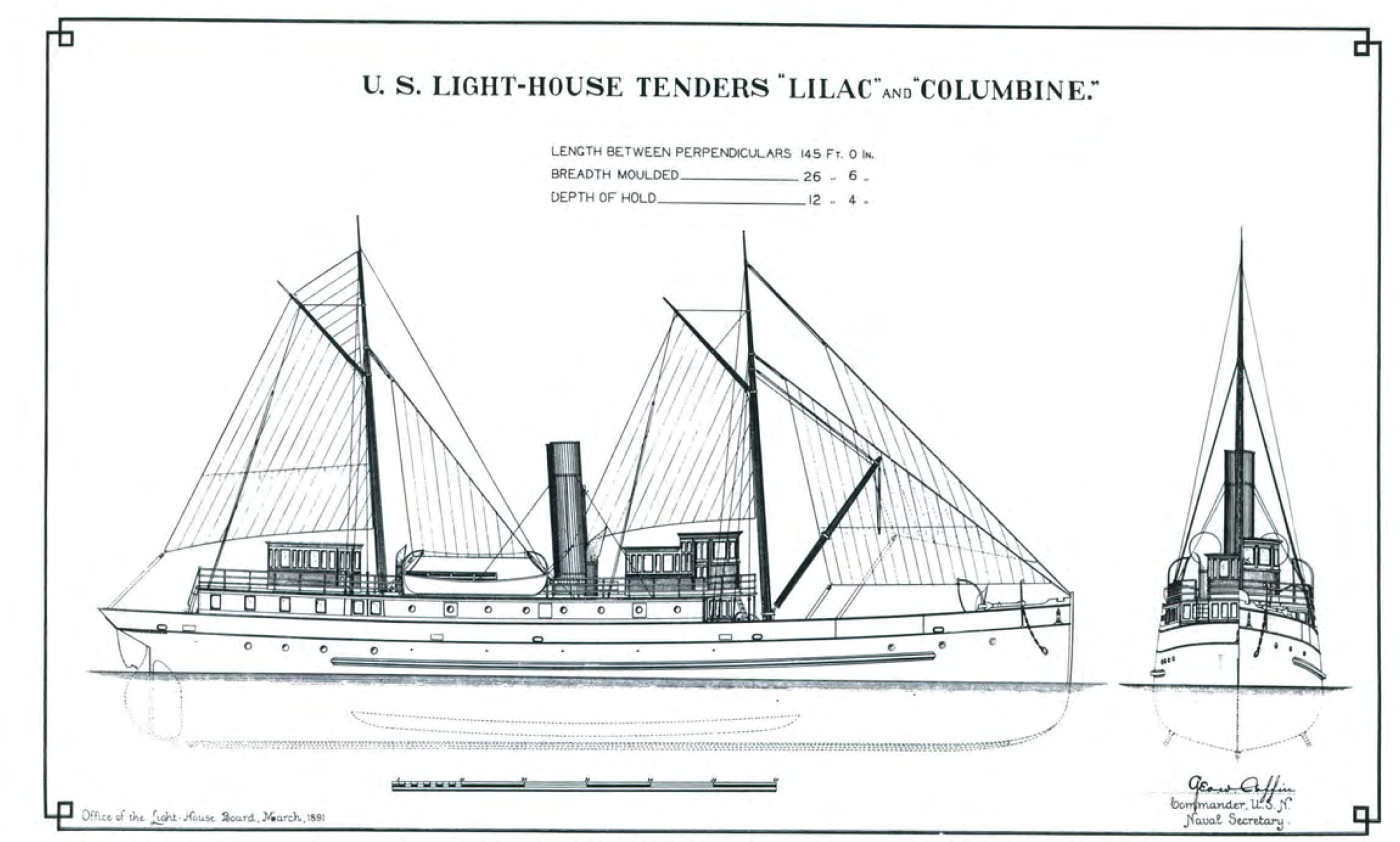
Lighthouse Board plan for Lilac

In its fiscal year 1888 annual report the Lighthouse Board recommended replacing the aging USLHT Iris in the 1st Lighthouse District. Reflecting on her poor condition, the Board wrote, "It is probable that if she was caught in a storm, or if she touched the bottom, she would become a complete wreck". Congress took no action to fund a replacement, so the Lighthouse Board renewed its request for a new tender in its 1889 report. On 30 September 1890, an appropriation was passed of $95,000 each for identical tenders in the 1st and 13th Lighthouse Districts.

Bids for sisterships USLHT Lilac and USLHT Columbine were opened at the Treasury Department on 23 April 1891. There were fourteen bidders, of which the Globe Iron Works Company of Cleveland, Ohio was the lowest on both vessels. Globe Iron Works bid $77,850 each to build the two ships. The Pennsylvania Steel Company of Sparrows Point Maryland bid $80,000 on Columbine, and $80,300 on Lilac, but wrote in pen, on the edge of the printed bid form, that it would build both ships for $155,000. Since this amount was $700 less than the Globe Iron Works bids taken together, controversy ensued. Globe Iron Works corporate secretary, Luther Allen, met with U.S. Treasury Secretary Charles Foster, previously governor of Ohio, to argue that the Lighthouse Board had not called for a joint bid and thus it would be illegal to consider the Maryland company's joint bid. Allen won the argument. Globe Iron Works was notified that it had been awarded the contract for both ships on 28 April 1891. U.S. Navy Commander Charles V. Gridley was sent to Cleveland to oversee the construction of the two ships for the Lighthouse Board.

Lilac was launched on 30 March 1892. She was christened by Miss Lois Augusta Allen, the 8-year-old daughter of Luther Allen. In attendance at the launch were Commander George W. Coffin, Naval Secretary to the Lighthouse Board, naval architect Walfred Sylvan, who designed the ship, and Commander Frank Wildes, the District Inspector of the 1st Lighthouse District, who Lilac would serve once commissioned.

Her hull and bulwarks were constructed of mild-steel plating riveted together. She was built with a double bottom and 12 water-tight compartments as safety measures against flooding due to accidental grounding. She was 155 feet (47 m) long overall (145 feet (44 m) between perpendiculars), with a beam of 26 feet 6 inches (8.08 m) and a depth of hold of 12 feet 4 inches (3.76 m). Lilac's draft, when fully loaded, was 12 feet 3 inches (3.73 m). Her fully loaded displacement was 643 tons, and her light displacement was 434 tons.

She had two Norway pine masts and was schooner-rigged for sailing. The foremast was equipped with a wooden boom that allowed it to be used as a derrick to hoist buoys aboard. A separate steam-powered winch drove the hoist.

Lilac had a single propeller 9 feet 4 inches (2.84 m) in diameter. She had a single inverted-cylinder, surface-condensing steam engine to drive the propeller. It had two cylinders of 22 and 41 inches in diameter with a stroke of 30 inches. The engine had an indicated horsepower of 800. Steam was provided by two cylindrical coal-fired two boilers, each of which was 10 feet 9 inches (3.28 m) long and 10 feet 8 inches (3.25 m) in diameter. While her original steam engine appears to have been used for her entire career, her two original boilers were replaced by a single unit in 1900. He boiler was converted to burn oil instead of coal by at least 1931.

Running from bow to stern on the lower deck were a fore-peak storeroom, crew quarters including 12 berths, lockers, wardrobes and wash basins, the cargo hold, the coal bunkers, boiler room, and engine room. Aft of the engine room were crew quarters with another 12 berths, a pantry, and another storeroom. On the main deck forward was a room for two small steam engines to lift the anchors and run a windlass, and at the stern of the ship a room for the steam-powered steering equipment. The open buoy deck was forward of the deckhouse on the main deck. The deckhouse contained the Inspector's quarters, which consisted of two staterooms, a panty, and bathroom, three staterooms for the ship's officers, the galley, saloon, and a storeroom. The second level of the deckhouse contained the pilothouse and captain's stateroom forward, and another stateroom aft. The ship had steam heating. There were two 500 U.S. gallons (1,900 L) potable water tanks.

Lilac's original cost was $92,125.

The ship's complement varied over the years. In 1894 it consisted of the captain, mate, 2 quartermasters, 2 engineers, 2 cooks, 3 firemen, and 6 deckhands. The ship's complement in 1909 was 5 officers and 16 men. By 1917 her crew had grown to 5 officers and 19 men.

United States buoy tenders are traditionally named for trees, shrubs, and flowering plants. Lilac is named for the Lilac, a flowering shrub. She was the first lighthouse tender named Lilac, but not the last. A second USLHT Lilac was launched in 1933.

Lilac had a successful sea trial on 11 July 1892 and was clocked at 13 3/4 knots. She left Cleveland for her new homeport at Portland, Maine on 17 July 1892. She was delivered there by a crew from Globe Iron Works on 3 August 1892. She replaced USLHT Iris, which was decommissioned and sold.

== Government service (1892-1925) ==
=== US Lighthouse Service, 1st District (1892-1912) ===
Lilac was commissioned at Portland, Maine on 3 August 1892.

Lilac first sailed in the fleet of the U.S. Lighthouse Board, a bureau of the U.S. Department of the Treasury. In this quasi-military organization, each Lighthouse District had an Inspector, typically a Naval officer, and an Engineer, typically an officer from the Army Corps of Engineers. While the Engineer was primarily responsible for the construction and maintenance of lighthouses, piers, and other structures, the Inspector was primarily responsible for supplying lighthouses and lightships, and maintaining buoys and lightships in their assigned locations. Lilac supported the Inspector of the 1st Lighthouse District.

Supporting the District Inspector, Lilac had a number of missions along the coasts of Maine and New Hampshire. She placed new buoys, cleaned and maintained existing buoys, reset buoys that were moved off-station by storms, and ice, and removed buoys that were worn out. Every fall she would swap or remove buoys which could be damaged by ice, replacing some with small, light wooden spar buoys. In the spring, she would swap them back. In 1895, for example, she replaced 128 buoys, changed 251 buoys, and painted 715 buoys.

Lighthouses were operated by lighthouse keepers, who kept the lanterns fueled, their wicks trimmed, and their lenses clean. Many lighthouses were inaccessible from land, so lighthouse keepers depended on lighthouse tenders for supplies. Lilac was used to deliver food, water, wood, coal, lantern fuel, and other supplies to lighthouses. In 1895, Lilac supplied Halfway Rock light, Boon Island light, Cuckolds light, Monhegan Island light, Matinicus Rock light, Saddleback Ledge light, Mount Desert light, and Whaleback light. She landed 157 tons of coal to these stations in 1895.

In 1893 Lilac placed buoys for the official trial runs of two new U.S. Navy cruisers, USS New York, and USS Columbia. In 1900 she spent eleven days buoying trial courses for the battleships, USS Kearsarge and USS Kentucky.

Lilac was part of the naval review on the Hudson River during the dedication of Grant's Tomb in New York City on 27 April 1897.

In 1898, during the Spanish-American War, mines were laid along the Maine coast to protect it from Spanish invasion. Lilac placed buoys to mark safe channels through the minefield.

In December 1910, Lilac towed the three-masted schooner Mary Curtis from a dangerous position among the breakers off Two Bush Island, Maine, likely saving her from destruction.

In 1903, the Lighthouse Board was transferred to the newly created U.S. Department of Commerce and Labor. Since the Lighthouse Board still had operational control of the U.S. Lighthouse Service, little changed in Lilac's operations. In 1910, Congress abolished the Lighthouse Board and replaced it with the all-civilian Lighthouse Bureau of the Department of Commerce and Labor. This change did impact the ship's work in that District Inspectors and Engineers were replaced by a single District Superintendent. All ships did any construction, maintenance, or buoy tending they were assigned. For instance, in October 1911, Lilac carried a cargo of sand and gravel to the Isle of Shoals light to be used in the construction of a new fog signal, a job that would have been done by the District Engineer's tender in the previous organization.

In 1911 USLHT Myrtle, which shared duties with Lilac in the 1st Lighthouse District, was replaced by the more modern USLHT Hibiscus. Lilac's crew was transferred to Hibiscus, and Myrtle's crew was transferred to Lilac, maintaining local knowledge on both tenders. In 1912 Lilac was replaced by USLHT Zizania. Lilac sailed to New York for extensive repairs, including replacing hull plates that had rusted nearly through.

=== US Lighthouse Service, various districts (1912–1917) ===
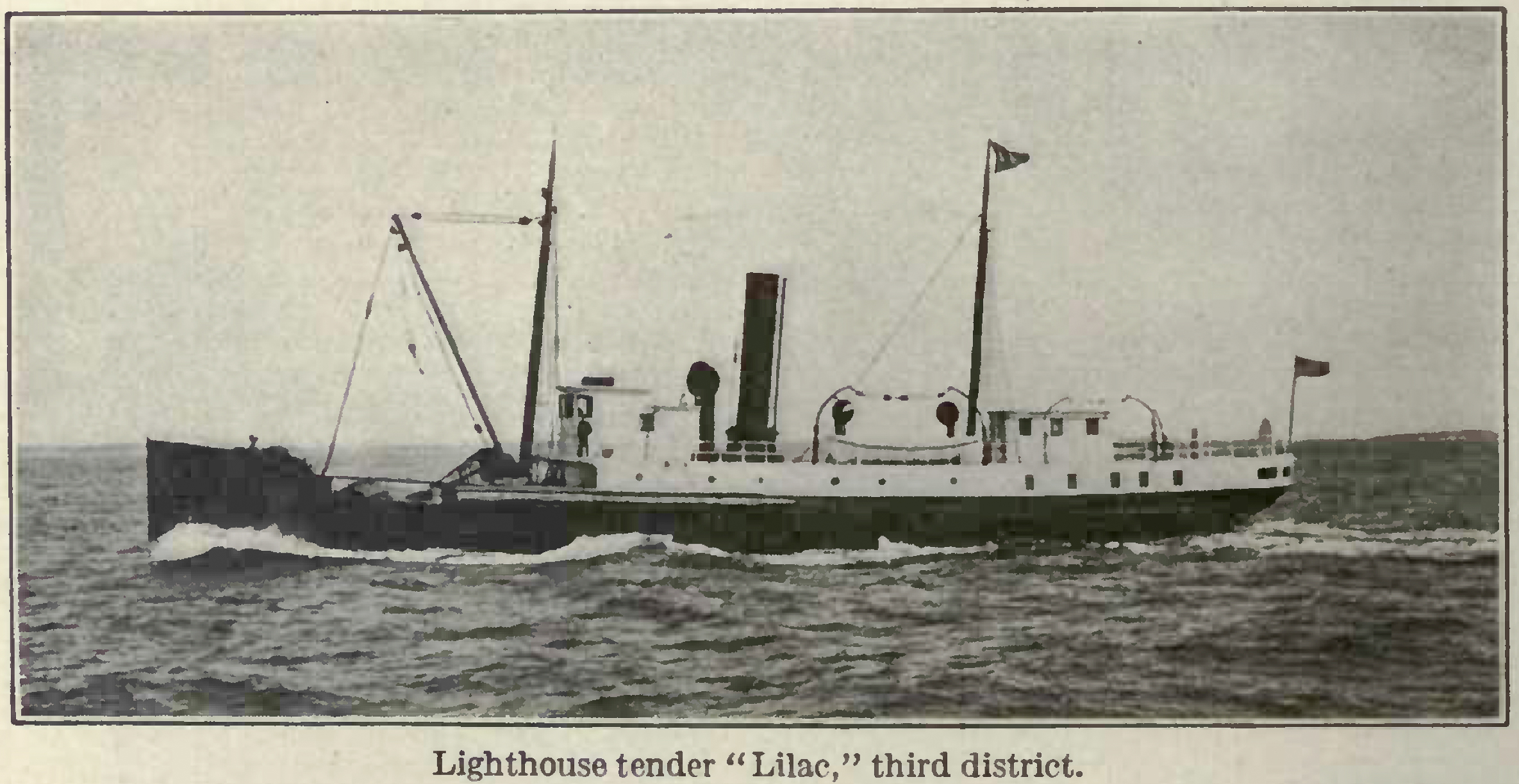
Lilac gave up her white hull paint as the dirty job of buoy tending made it hard to maintain. The caption, "third district" dates this photo to 1915.

After her shipyard visit in 1912, Lilac was assigned to the 6th Lighthouse District, which covered the coasts of Georgia, and South Carolina, and adjacent portions of the coasts of North Carolina and Florida. She was then transferred to the 8th Lighthouse District, based in New Orleans. In mid-July 1914, Lilac completed a shipyard visit in New Orleans. She sailed to Key West, where she was fumigated against possible bubonic plague which was active in New Orleans at the time. The ship stopped in Charleston, South Carolina for coal on 23 July 1914. On 25 July 1914 Lilac sailed for her former station at Portland, Maine. Her stay in Maine was short. In 1915 she was transferred to the 3rd Lighthouse District. Lilac was laid-up for portions of fiscal year 1915 and 1916 due to a lack of funding for crew salaries.

By 1917 she was assigned to the 9th Lighthouse District in Puerto Rico. The 9th District encompassed Puerto Rico, the U.S. Virgin Islands, and other United States possessions in the West Indies. Lilac would spend the rest of her career with the Lighthouse Service there.

=== US Navy (1917-1919) ===
On 11 April 1917 President Wilson issued Executive Order 2588 transferring a number of lighthouse tenders to support the American effort in World War I. Lilac was transferred to the United States Navy. She was commissioned as USS Lilac, the second U.S. naval vessel of that name.

After the war, on 1 July 1919, the components of the Lighthouse Service which had become part of the Navy were returned to the supervision of the Department of Commerce. Lilac was struck from the Navy List.

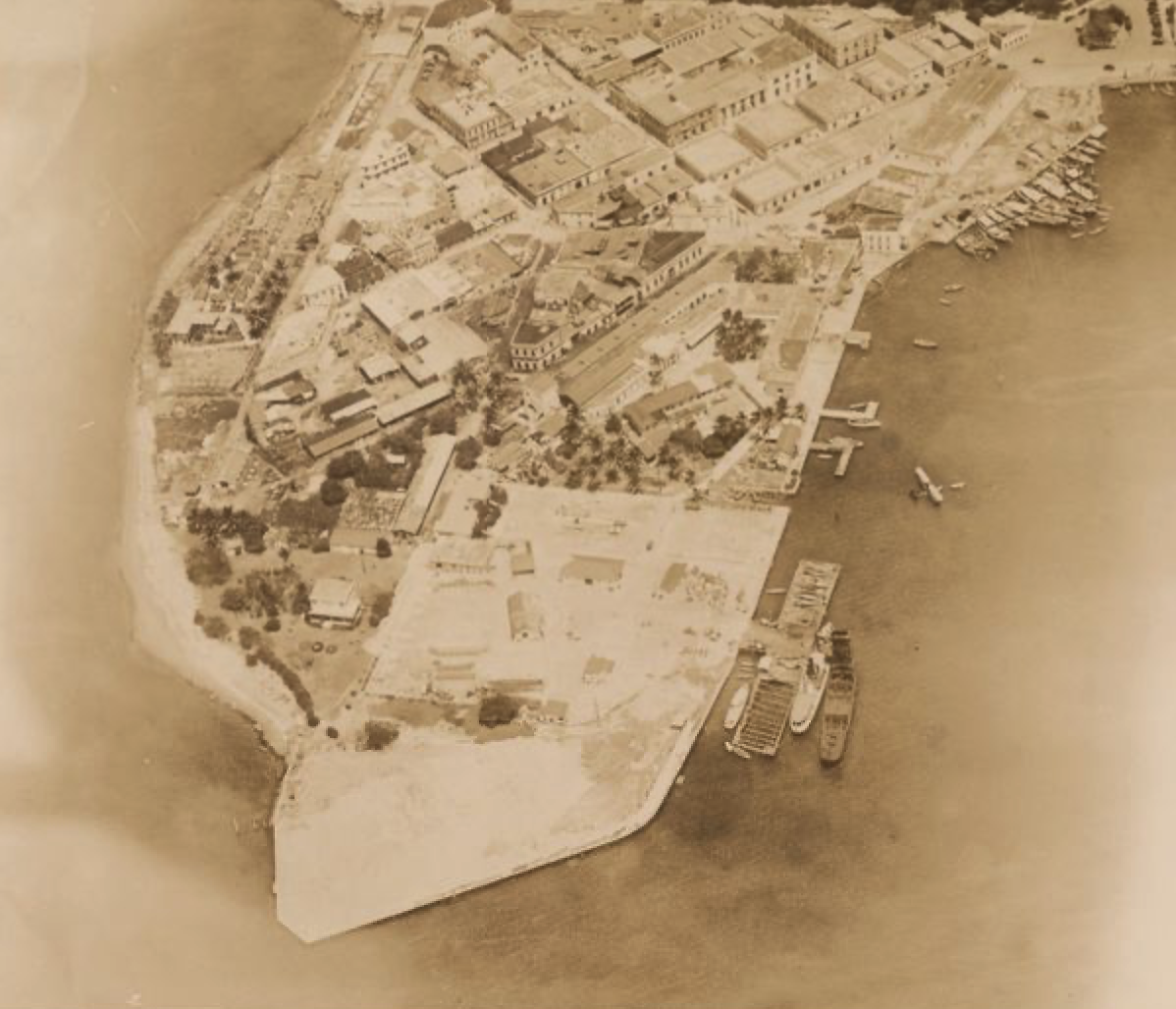
San Juan Lighthouse Depot in 1924. Lilac is likely the vessel moored at the dock.

=== US Lighthouse Service (1919-1925), 9th District ===
The patrol boat USS May ran aground off Cape Engano, in the Dominican Republic on 27 July 1919. Lilac and submarine chaser 126 responded to distress calls from May and took off 77 men from the wrecked ship.

On 9 July 1920, USAT Northern Pacific went aground at the entrance to San Juan Harbor. General of the Armies John J. Pershing was aboard for an inspection tour. Lilac assisted in refloating the liner.

USS Grebe was towing the Army Corps of Engineers dredge Captain Houston from Saint Thomas to San Juan when she broke down on 10 May 1923. Lilac raised steam and towed both of the ships in to San Juan Harbor.

=== Disposal of Lilac ===
As early as his 1919 annual report, the commissioner of lighthouses warned that Lilac was "worn out". On 24 September 1924, Lilac sailed for the last time from San Juan. She was bound for Norfolk, but stopped along the way to work on lighthouses in Mayaguez, Navassa Island, and Guantanamo, Cuba. Heading north, she made stops at Key West, Mayport, and Charleston before reaching Norfolk on 20 October 1924. She was replaced at San Juan by her sister ship, USLHT Columbine. Lilac's officers were transferred to Columbine to maintain local knowledge. Lilac was decommissioned on 18 November 1924.

On 18 February 1925 the Lighthouse Service announced that it would sell Lilac through a sealed bid process. Bids were opened by the superintendent of the 5th Lighthouse District on 3 March 1925. On 8 April 1925 Lilac was sold for $7,850 to a person identifying himself as Joseph H. Riley, who gave his address as a hotel in Baltimore.

== Private ownership (1925-1938?) ==
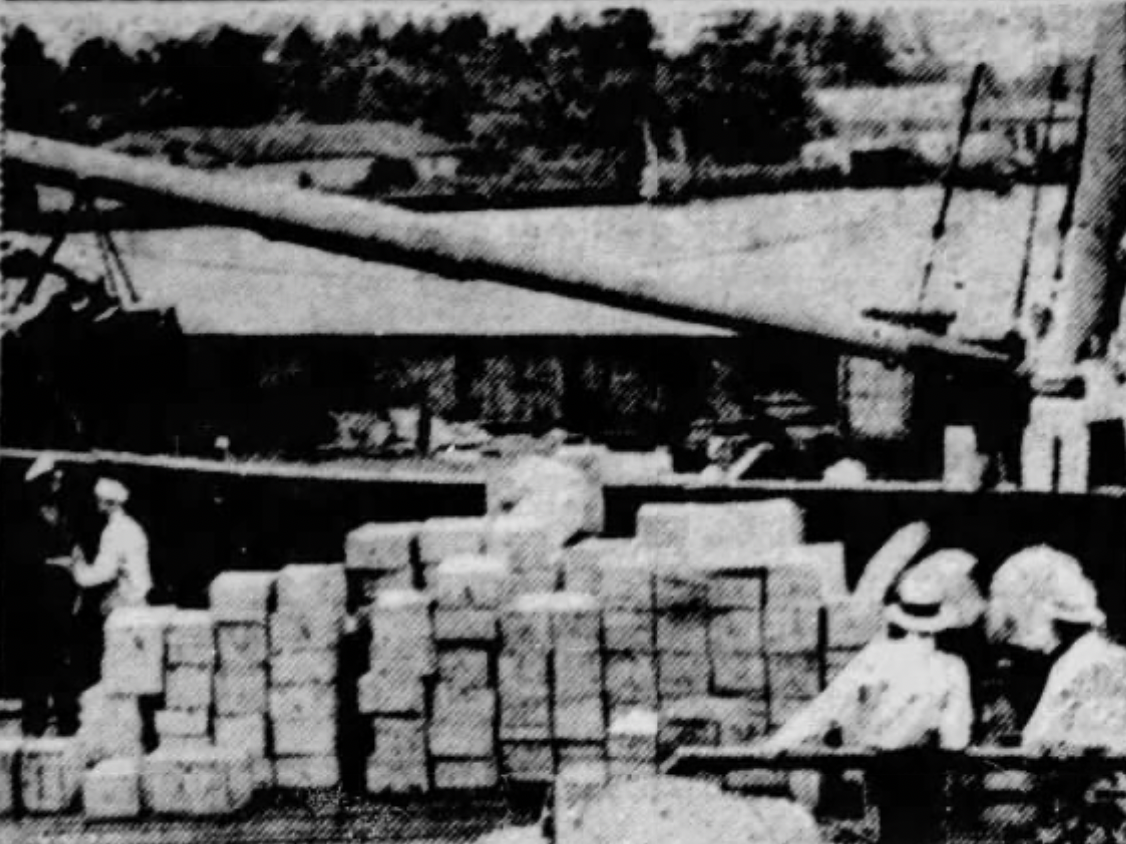
Cases of contraband liquor off-loaded from Elma on 27 June 1926

=== Rum-runner (1925–1926) ===
Lilac was renamed Elma. Her new job was to smuggle liquor into the United States during prohibition, masquerading as a Lighthouse Service vessel. Elma had become part of the bootlegging syndicate run by Charles and Cecil Kinder, and DeWitt Turner.

Cecil Kinder testified that he was aboard Elma when she ran from Halifax to Chicago with a load of liquor. By November 1925 the ship had returned from Chicago, and was noted at Vineyard Haven, where she took refuge from a storm. Elma began to be well known among Federal agents. She was withdrawn from rum running for roughly six months to reduce the scrutiny of the authorities. She was dry-docked for maintenance, and moored in Boston.

Elma sailed from Boston in late May 1926 without cargo. Federal authorities noted her departure and alerted the Coast Guard. She put in to Moorehead City, North Carolina for coal and food. Off the coast of North Carolina she met a supply ship from Havana and the two were lashed together. Cases of liquor were transferred to Elma until a rising storm caused the two ships to be separated. Adding a bizarre twist to the story, a hijacker had stowed away in Boston. He was in league with two of the crew who fed him surreptitiously for two weeks. Once the liquor was aboard, he attempted to take over the ship and its valuable cargo. He managed to take a shot at the captain, but was overpowered, and made prisoner on the rum-runner.

On 20 June 1926 the U.S. Coast Guard Cutter Manning intercepted Elma off the coast of North Carolina. She was reported to be flying a Lighthouse Service flag at the time. Manning fired several warning shots before Elma hove to. As the cutter approached, Elma's crew began throwing overboard cases of liquor. In her hold, Elma had approximately 4,700 cases of scotch, rye, gin, and Champagne valued at $300,000. Manning towed Elma to Norfolk, but after consulting with legal authorities moved her to North Carolina which had jurisdiction on the smuggling charges since its waters were where the ship had been found. The contraband was offloaded at Wilmington, North Carolina over three days beginning on 27 June 1926. The 14 members of her crew were taken to jail.

As a result of her illegal activities, Elma was confiscated by the Federal Government. The U.S. District Court judge overseeing the matter, Isaac M. Meekins, took bids for the ship in November 1926. Union Shipbuilding Company of Baltimore had the high bid of $2,700. Under the rules pertaining to the sale of vessels seized by the government, a 10% higher bid after the fact reopened the process. New bids were taken in December 1926. George T. Linton had the high bid on this second round, and purchased Elma for $4,000 in December 1926.

=== Linton Lines (1926–1930) ===
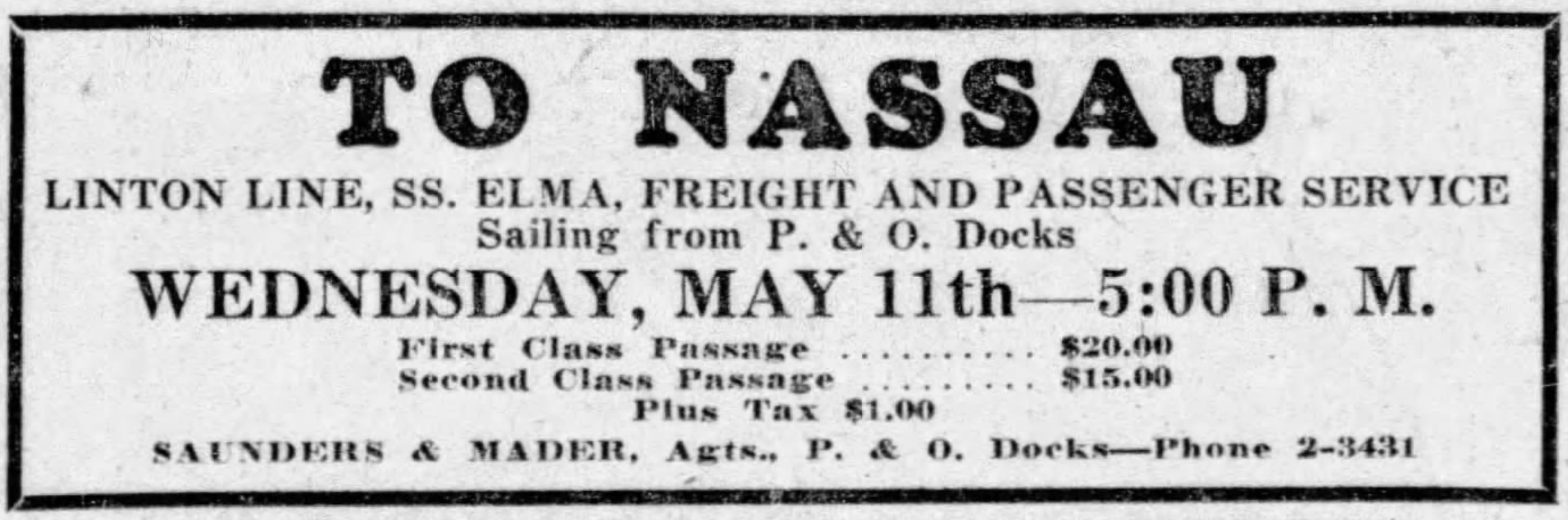
1927 advertisement for Elma

Elma sailed from Wilmington on 3 January 1927 for Jacksonville, for a quick shipyard visit. The ship arrived in Miami, her new home port, on 18 January 1927. She returned to legitimate trade, carrying passengers and freight for the Linton Steamship Lines of New York. Her route was Miami to Nassau, The Bahamas, which she sailed twice a week. A first class passage was $20, and a second class passage was $15. Elma's first sailing for her new line was on 25 January 1927. On this first trip she went aground at Nassau. She was quickly refloated and continued her regular schedule.

Her last reported sailing to Nassau was in June 1927. In July 1927 Linton went in search of a larger vessel and ultimately purchased Princess Montague, which had capacity for 125 first class passengers. She took over Elma's twice a week, Miami-Nassau route. Elma was idle, anchored or moored at various locations in Biscayne Bay, at least through July 1930. She was inspected by a prospective buyer that month.

=== Garlick Navigation Company (1930–1938?) ===
Sometime in the second half of 1930, Linton sold Elma to the Garlick Navigation Company. Robert J. Garlick was an independent gas station operator in the Miami area. Garlick found no regular employment for Elma. For a time in 1931, Elma carried general cargoes between Port Everglades and Jacksonville. After one voyage, Elma unloaded 50 tons of flour, fertilizer, furniture, and lubricants at Port Everglades. The Broward County Port Authority spent $1,006 to subsidize this service through May 1931. Once the subsidy was cancelled, Elma gave up this route.

After she was taken off her regular freight route, Garlick used Elma to carry gasoline from Pensacola to Miami for his stations. In 1933 she towed the gambling ship Monte Carlo from Tampa to Miami. In 1935 Garlick outfitted Elma for shark fishing.

Some newspapers reported that W. K. Reuleaux of New Orleans purchased Elma in February 1936, and others identified him as the ship's agent. Her Federal documentation through 1938, however, shows her owned by Garlick. In any case, a crew was hired to sail her from Miami, on 14 February 1936, bound for New Orleans. The trip did not go well. Elma was beset by a storm, ran out of fuel, and drifted for a week. There was no radio aboard to call for help. The crew of thirteen was out of food before they were able to get help from a passing ship. USCGC Kimball was dispatched to tow the ship from the Gulf of Mexico. Elma was finally reached New Orleans on 23 February 1936.

After 1938 she disappears from Federal documentation and newspaper accounts. The ship's ultimate fate is unknown.
