= USS Iris (1863) =

History

United States
- Ordered: as Willet Rowe
- Laid down: date unknown
- Launched: 1863
- Acquired: 16 October 1863
- In service: 2 November 1863
- Out of service: 15 July 1865
- Stricken: 1865 (est.)
- Fate: Transferred to the United States Treasury Department for the Lighthouse Service 18 October 1865

General characteristics
- Displacement: 159 tons
- Length: 87 ft (27 m)
- Beam: 19 ft (5.8 m)
- Draught: 9 ft (2.7 m)
- Propulsion: steam engine; side wheel-propelled
- Speed: 10 knots
- Complement: 34
- Armament: two 20-pounder Parrott rifles

USS Iris was a steamer acquired by the Union Navy during the American Civil War. She was used by the Navy to patrol navigable waterways of the Confederacy to prevent the South from trading with other countries.

Iris was built as Willet Rowe at Brooklyn, New York, in 1863 and was purchased by the Navy in New York City from C. W. Copeland 16 October of that year. She was outfitted as an armed tug and sailed from New York City 2 November to join the South Atlantic Blockading Squadron off Charleston, South Carolina, 6 November. She took station inside the bar at Charleston where she served faithfully during most of the remainder of the war.

== Service history ==
USS Iris steamed with Nipsic to the North Edisto River 8 February 1864 to support a reconnaissance in force undertaken by the Union Army as a diversion to prevent Southern troops in the Charleston area from moving to Florida for action against Brigadier General Truman Seymour. A week later she was back at her old station inside the bar.

On 12 December Iris moved to the Savannah River to be on hand to support General William Tecumseh Sherman at the end of his march through Georgia to the sea where he was assured of supplies and a secure operating base behind the big guns of the Navy. From Savannah, Georgia, she sailed to Port Royal, South Carolina, for repairs, arriving 1 January 1865.

Iris returned to service early in February in time to participate in the expedition to Bull's Bay which diverted Confederate troops from General Sherman's path as he marched north close to the sea ever ready to retire to the coast under Naval protection if necessary. The combined forces departed Charleston Roads on the night of 11 February and entered Bull's Bay before daybreak the next morning.

The Union ships engaged enemy forts at Andersonville, Georgia, 13 February but found the Confederate positions too strong to carry. The next 2 days were spent exploring the marshlands in the area seeking a route which would enable the Northern vessels to approach Andersonville from the rear. A passage was found on the night of 15 February enabling Iris and other ships to land troops behind the fortress which soon fell. This diversionary movement was one of the factors which compelled the Confederacy to evacuate Charleston, South Carolina, where the war had begun four long years earlier, with the firing on Fort Sumter.

Iris remained in Charleston until 28 April when she sailed with eight other ships to the coast of Florida to intercept Jefferson Davis and his cabinet in their flight toward political asylum in Cuba. Upon learning of Davis' capture at Irwinville, Georgia, she returned to Charleston where she remained until sailing north with Rear Admiral John A. Dahlgren in Pawnee 17 June.

She decommissioned at Washington Navy Yard 15 July 1865 and was transferred to the U.S. Treasury Department for the Lighthouse Service 18 October 1865.

Iris was retired from her lighthouse tender duties in 1892 and sold. She was replaced by USLHT Lilac.
