= Henry D. Coffinberry =

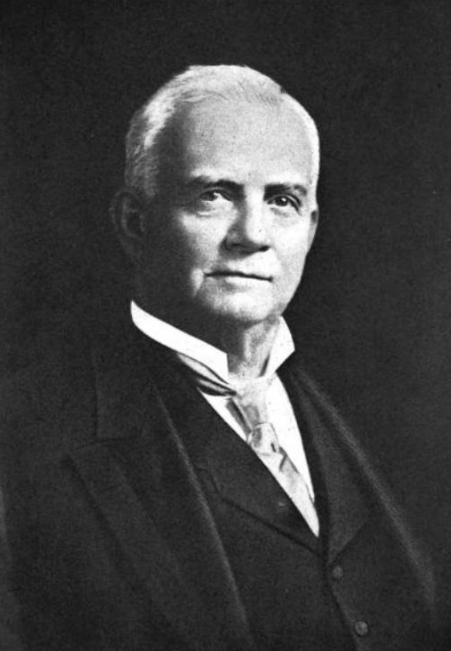
- Born: Henry Darling Coffinberry; October 12, 1841; Maumee, Ohio
- Died: January 17, 1912 (aged 70); Cleveland, Ohio
- Resting place: Lake View Cemetery, Cleveland
- Education: Graduate of West High School of Cleveland, Ohio.
- Occupations: Industrialist, ship building
- Known for: One of the founders of the Globe Iron Works/Globe Shipbuilding Company, the Cleveland Shipbuilding Company and the Ship Owner's Dry Dock Co. all of which eventually came to be known as the American Ship Building Company
- Spouse(s): Harriet Duane Morgan Coffinberry, daughter of General George W. Morgan
- Children: Nadine Morgan Coffinberry Morley (1876–1964); Maria Duane Coffinberry (1879–1952)
- Parent(s): James McClure Coffinberry (1818–1891); Anna Maria Coffinberry (1820–1897)
- Relatives: Mary Elizabeth Coffinberry Brooks (1853–1938) (sister)

Henry Darling Coffinberry (October 12, 1841 – January 17, 1912) was an American industrialist from Cleveland, Ohio. Along with his partner, Robert Wallace, H. D. Coffinberry is considered one of the founding fathers of modern Great Lakes shipping. Following a memorable Civil War career on the ironclad gunboat Louisville, Coffinberry returned to civilian life in Cleveland, Ohio. There he met Robert Wallace and together they built the first iron- and steel-hulled freighters to be used on the Great Lakes.

Coffinberry and Wallace were partners in both a foundry (Globe Iron Works) and a wooden shipbuilding firm, (Cleveland Dry Dock Company). Coffinberry became president of the Globe Ship Building Company in the early 1880s, which launched the first iron-hulled (Onoko, 1882) and steel-hulled (Spokane, 1886) Great Lakes freighters. After selling their share to M. A. Hanna, Coffinberry and several partners left Globe in 1886 to create the Cleveland Shipbuilding Company, followed by the Ship Owners Dry Dock Company. Coffinberry served as president of the firms until retiring in 1893. He was also an investor in the Elwell Parker Electric Motor Company of America, formed in 1893 to produce electric motors for bulk cargo handling. By 1899 the firm produced motors for battery-driven automobiles, but the company earned its reputation after 1906 as a manufacturer of electric industrial trucks to more efficiently move baggage and cargo at train terminals and shipping ports.

== Early life ==
Henry D. Coffinberry was born in Maumee, Ohio, October 12, 1841 (some records list his birth as October 14, 1841). He was the son of Judge James M. Coffinberry, of Cleveland, and Anna M. Coffinberry, who was a direct descendant of Thomas Fitch, colonial governor of Rhode Island, and related to John Fitch, the inventor who was the first to apply steam to navigation. Other members of the family were ship owners and masters of vessels. Mr. Coffinberry's father, the Judge, was a descendant of Andrew Coffinberry, a lawyer and geologist of some fame and a patriot of distinction, having served in the Federal navy under Bainbridge and Hull in the War of 1812.

Henry D. Coffinberry graduated from West High School of Cleveland, Ohio. During his school years he had many opportunities to learn the art of handling yachts and other small boats.

== Civil War ==
Wanting to serve in the Civil War, when he was eighteen years of age Coffinberry obtained the reluctant consent from his parents to join the Navy. He shipped as an ordinary seaman at Erie, Penn.; he was then sent to the receiving ship Clara Dolson, at Cairo, Illinois, where he was promoted on the recommendation of Commanders Pennock and Phelps, to master's mate, and reported to Lieutenant Commander Richard W. Meade, on the ironclad gunboat Louisville. She was one of the six original ironclad steamers constructed by General Fremont on the Mississippi river at the breaking out of the war, and known as the "Fremont Turtles."

The first engagement in which he participated was that of Haines Bluff, where the fleet under command of Rear Admiral David D. Porter was obliged to retire after a stubborn fight. His next experience in war was at the Battle of Fort Hindman, where they captured Fort Hindman after a hard battle of nine hours at short range.

Immediately after this victory he was promoted, on recommendation of Admiral Porter, to the rank of acting ensign. He participated in the exciting episode of the running of the batteries at the Vicksburg, the two engagements at Grand Gulf on the Mississippi, those of the second Yazoo Pass and the Red River expeditions, under General Banks, in which the troops and gunboats acted in conjunction.

Soon after the return of the fleet from the last Red River expedition, Mr. Coffinberry was examined and promoted to the rank of acting master and executive officer of the Louisville, and finally commanding officer of that gunboat. She was 160 feet long, 52 feet beam and drew 5½ feet of water. She was propelled by a recessed stern wheel, and was rated as a second or third class sloop of war. Her battery consisted of a 100-pound Parrott rifle, four nine-inch Dahlgren guns, six thirty-two-pound smooth-bores, two thirty-pound Parrott rifles and a twenty-four-pound howitzer. She carried 160 men and twenty-five officers.

At the close of the war he put the Louisville out of commission, and was appointed to the command of the USS Fairy, a position he held until the reconstruction of the South had assumed some definite shape, when he returned home. Admiral Porter tendered him support and influence in case he desired to continue his career in the navy. Preferring civil life in the years of peace, he declined, and was honorably discharged, with the thanks of the navy department.

== Foundry and ship building career ==
Shortly after receiving his discharge from the service of the United States Government, Coffinberry engaged in mercantile business as a partner of Messrs. Leavitt & Crane in founding a carriage and wagon axle manufactory in Cleveland, Ohio. After a time he sold out his interest in this firm and bought a fourth-interest in a small machine shop, doing business under the firm name of Robert Wallace & Co., (John F. Pankhurst and Arthur Sawtel being the company). Mr. Sawtel soon sold his interest to the company, who carried on the business for three years with considerable success. In 1869 they purchased the interests of William Bowler, Robert Cartwright and Robert Sanderson in the Globe Iron Works, Mr. John B. Cowles retaining his interest and joining the new firm. Mr. Coffinberry was chosen financial manager of this firm as he had been of the firm of Robert Wallace & Co. As this new business proved successful, the firm was soon able to purchase a half-interest in the Cleveland Dry Dock Company. Mr. George Presley, owner of the other half- interest, remained manager and Mr. Coffinberry assumed charge of the financial end of the business. The firm as thus constituted engaged in the construction of wooden ships.

Mr. Coffinberry soon became convinced of the utility of building iron and steel vessels. After a thorough investigation of the subject, taking into his counsel such veteran owners of lake craft as Capt. William Pringle, George W. Jones, J. W. Nicholas, Philip Minch and C. E. King., Coffinberry defined a new type of vessel for service on the Great Lakes. These gentlemen also conveyed their conclusions to Gen. O. M. Poe, United States engineer, who then designed the locks at the Sault Ste. Marie to allow passage of vessels with 300 to 600 feet keels. Thus it was that Mr. Coffinberry, and these gentlemen became the pioneers of the modern lake freighter. After founding the plant and laying the keel of the iron steamer Onoko, the firm was incorporated under the name of the Globe Ship Building Company, of which Mr. Coffinberry was chosen president and financial manager. After continuing business under these papers of incorporation, and building many iron and steel vessels, a difference arose between the old partners, and Messrs. Coffinberry, Wallace and Cowles sought to purchase the interest of Mr. Pankhurst. Failing in this, they sold their interests to Mr. M. A. Hanna.

In the summer of 1886, Messrs. H. D. Coffinberry and Robert Wallace, with the assistance of a few of the enterprising vessel owners of Cleveland, purchased the plant of the old Cuyahoga Furnace Company. They increased the plant's capacity for general machine and foundry work, by building a large brick machine shop, a top story fronting on the viaduct, which contained the offices, and a brick boiler shop. They also built an extensive shipbuilding plant on the river front, capable of building four of the largest vessels per annum. They then announced themselves as ready for the construction of modern lake vessels. This company was incorporated as the Cleveland Shipbuilding Company in 1888 and later became the American Ship Building Company. Mr. Coffinberry was chosen president and financial manager; Mr. Wallace, vice-president and general superintendent; William M. Fitch, secretary, and James Wallace, designing engineer.

Orders soon encouraged this new enterprise, and the company then decided to build a large dry dock, which was done and incorporated as the Ship Owners Dry Dock. This dock was large enough to receive the largest hulls then on the lakes; however it proved inadequate to accommodate the extensive demands made upon it, and a smaller dock, was sunk alongside of it. Mr. George Quayle was manager of these docks. This company also purchased the wooden shipyards of William Radcliffe, and was thus able to construct wooden vessels. After seeing these great results grow from small beginnings, and being content with the profits accruing, in 1893 Mr. Coffinberry retired to his home at Clifton Park, which was surrounded by a natural growth of forest trees, and overlooked Lake Erie.

After Mr. Coffinberry's retirement, the Ship Owner's Dry Dock Co. was acquired by the Globe Shipbuilding Company in 1897. Eventually (1899) Globe Shipbuilding Company, Ship Owner's Dry Dock Company and Cleveland Ship Building Company were consolidated under the name American Ship Building Company. This was after M. A. Hanna acquired controlling interest in the companies.

Henry D. Coffinberry was also a member of the first board of five commissioners of Cleveland, a director of the State Bank and a member of the Board of Industry of Cleveland. He owned large interests in several of the best vessels on the lakes and much valuable suburban real estate, and considerable mineral land in the West. He was chosen a delegate to the National Democratic Convention on the gold platform in 1896. He was one of the citizen members appointed by the common pleas judges to assist county commissioners in building new county buildings.

== Family ==
On April 7, 1875, Mr. H. D. Coffinberry was wedded to Miss Harriet Duane Morgan, daughter of General George W. Morgan, of Mt. Vernon, Ohio. The Coffinberrys had three daughters, two of whom survived to adulthood: Nadine Morgan and Maria Duane. Mrs. Coffinberry is a descendant of the Duane and Morgan families of Revolutionary times - the friends and fellow patriots of George Washington and Thomas Jefferson.

== Death and interment ==
Coffinberry died January 17, 1912, and was interred at Lake View Cemetery in Cleveland.

== See also ==
- Category:Ships built by the Globe Iron Works Company
