= USS Zirkel =

Cargo ship of the United States Navy

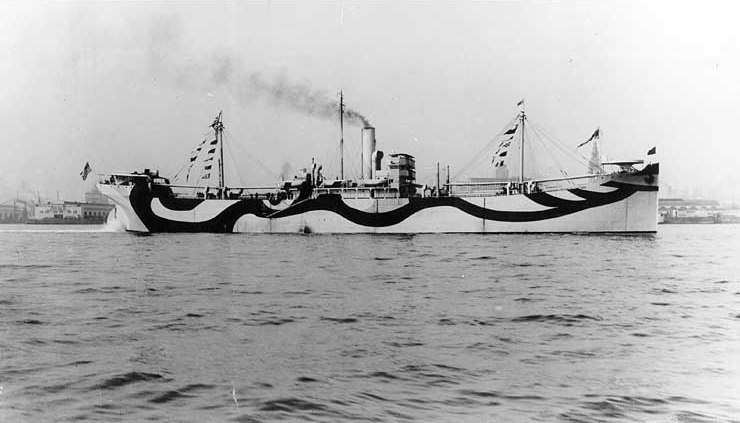
- USS Zirkel in September 1918

History

United States
- Name: USS Zirkel
- Namesake: Previous name retained
- Builder: Moore Shipbuilding Company, Oakland, California
- Launched: 17 August 1918
- Completed: 1918
- Acquired: 27 September 1918
- Commissioned: 27 September 1918
- Decommissioned: 3 May 1919
- Fate: Returned to United States Shipping Board, 3 May 1919; scrapped at Baltimore, Maryland, 1929
- Notes: Built for United States Shipping Board as SS Zirkel in 1918; in Shipping Board custody as SS Zirkel 1919-1929.

General characteristics
- Type: Cargo ship
- Tonnage: 6,163 Gross register tons
- Displacement: 12,700 tons
- Length: 416 ft 6 in (126.95 m)
- Beam: 53 ft 0 in (16.15 m)
- Draft: 27 ft 6 in (8.38 m) mean
- Speed: 10 knots (19 km/h)
- Complement: 62

USS Zirkel (ID-3407) was a cargo ship that served in the United States Navy from 1918 to 1919.

SS Zirkel was a Design 1015 ship built in 1918 at Oakland, California, for the United States Shipping Board by the Moore Shipbuilding Company. The U.S. Navy acquired her on 27 September 1918 for World War I service with the Naval Overseas Transportation Service, assigned her Identification Number (Id. No.) 3407, and commissioned her the same day as USS Zirkel (Id. No. 3407) at San Francisco, California.

Zirkel got underway for the Gulf of Mexico with a cargo of nitrates. Steaming via the Panama Canal, she arrived at New Orleans, Louisiana, on 30 January 1919 and unloaded her cargo.

Following repairs to her turbines, Zirkel filled her holds with cotton, coffee, and steel and put to sea on 6 February 1919. After a 21-day voyage, she entered port at Liverpool, England, and began unloading her cargo.

Zirkel then took on about 800 tons of iron ore and headed back to the United States on 13 March 1919. On 29 March 1919, the freighter arrived in Philadelphia, Pennsylvania, and, after unloading, began preparations for demobilization.

On 3 May 1919, Zirkel was decommissioned and was returned to the custody of the United States Shipping Board, once again becoming SS Zirkel. The Shipping Board retained her until she was sold to Union Shipbuilding Company of Baltimore, Maryland, in 1929. Zirkel was towed from New York by the company's steamer Columbine, reaching the ship breaking yard in Baltimore on 20 August 1929.
