= List of United States Navy ships: L =

Ships of the United States Navy

Ships in current service
- Current ships

Ships grouped alphabetically
- A–B; C; D–F; G–H; I–K; L; M; N–O; P; Q–R; S; T–V; W–Z

Ships grouped by type
- Aircraft carriers; Airships; Amphibious warfare ships; Auxiliaries; Battlecruisers; Battleships; Cruisers; Destroyers; Destroyer escorts; Destroyer leaders; Escort carriers; Frigates; Hospital ships; Littoral combat ships; Mine warfare vessels; Monitors; Oilers; Patrol vessels; Registered civilian vessels; Sailing frigates; Steam frigates; Steam gunboats; Ships of the line; Sloops of war; Submarines; Torpedo boats; Torpedo retrievers; Unclassified miscellaneous; Yard and district craft

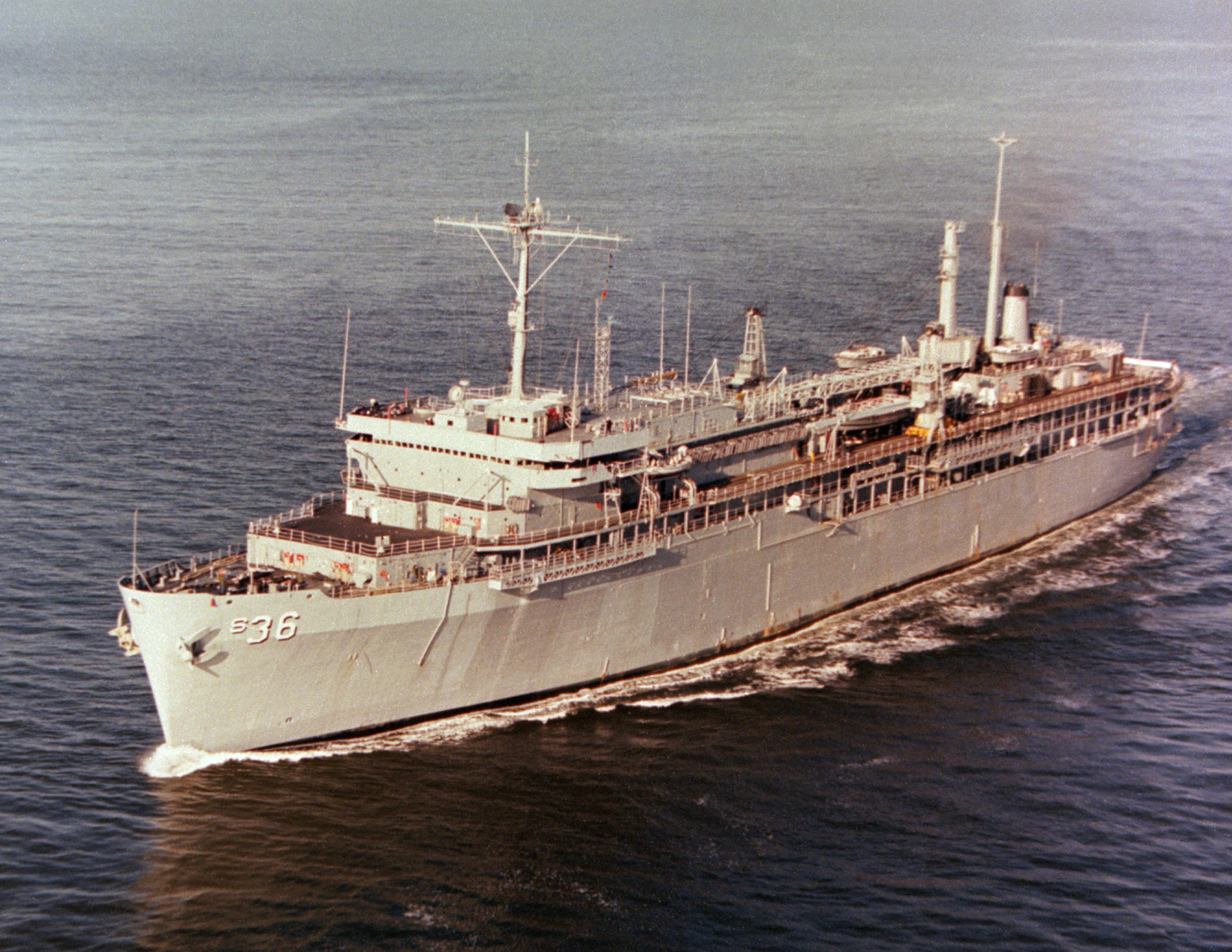
USS L. Y. Spear (AS-36)

This section of the list of United States Navy ships contains all ships of the United States Navy with names beginning with L.

For a list exclusively of currently commissioned ships, see the List of current ships of the United States Navy.

For ships with unique names, "USS Ship‍name" redirects to the ship article. For reused names, "USS Ship‍name" is an index page for the ships of that name; the links after the name lead to the specific ship pages.

== L ==
- USS L-1 (SS-40)
- USS L-2 (SS-41)
- USS L-3 (SS-42)
- USS L-4 (SS-43)
- USS L-5 (SS-44)
- USS L-6 (SS-45)
- USS L-7 (SS-46)
- USS L-8 (SS-48)
- USS L-9 (SS-49)
- USS L-10 (SS-50)
- USS L-11 (SS-51)
- USS L. A. Dempsey (SP-1231)
- USS L. C. Richmond (1861)
- USS L. K. Thurlow (1913)
- USS L. Mendel Rivers (SSN-686)
- USS L. Millandon (1856)
- USS L. Y. Spear (AS-36)
- USS La Jolla (SSN-701)
- USS La Moure County (LST-883, LST-1194)
- USS La Porte (APA-151)
- USS La Prade (DE-409)
- USS La Salle (AP-102, LPD-3/AGF-3)
- USS La Vallette (DD-315, DD-448)

=== Lab–Lak ===
- USS Laboon (DDG-58)
- USS Labuan (PF-80)
- USS Laburnum (1864)
- USS Lacerta (AKA-29)
- USS Lackawanna (1862, AO-40)
- USS Lackawapen (AO-82)
- USS Lackawaxen (AO-82)
- USS Lacosta (YFB-58)
- USS Lady Anne (SP-154)
- USS Lady Betty (SP-661)
- USS Lady Doris (SP-3854)
- USS Lady Mary (SP-212)
- USS Lady of the Lake (1813)
- USS Lady Prevost (1812)
- USS Lady Thorne (SP-962)
- USS Lady Washington (1776)
- USS Laertes (AR-20)
- USS Lafayette (1848, AP-53/APV-4, SSBN-616, FFG-65)
- USS Lafayette County (LST-859)
- USS Laffey (DD-459, DD-724)
- USS Lagarto (SS-371)
- USS Lagoda (SP-3250)
- USS La Grange (APA-124)
- USS Lakatoi (1938)
- USS Lake (DE-301, AK-5016)
- USS Lake Arthur (ID-2915)
- USS Lake Benbow (1918)
- USS Lake Berdan (ID-4276C)
- USS Lake Blanchester (ID-3597C)
- USS Lake Bloomington (1918)
- USS Lake Borgne (1918)
- USS Lake Bridge (ID-2990)
- USS Lake Capens (ID-4358)
- USS Lake Catherine (ID-3568)
- USS Lake Champlain (ID-1791, CV-39, CG-57)
- USS Lake Charlotte (ID-4394)
- USS Lake Clear (ID-3597D)
- USS Lake Conesus (ID-4331)
- USS Lake County (LST-880)
- USS Lake Crescent (ID-2557)
- USS Lake Damita (1918)
- USS Lake Dancey (ID-4407L)
- USS Lake Daraga (ID-4428)
- USS Lake Dymer (ID-4131)
- USS Lake Eckhart (ID-4353Z)
- USS Lake Eliko (ID-4353A)
- USS Lake Elizabeth (ID-2957)
- USS Lake Elsinore (ID-3765B)
- USS Lake Erie (ID-2190, CG-70)
- USS Lake Fernwood (ID-4410)
- USS Lake Forest (ID-2991)
- USS Lake Frances (ID-4406)
- USS Lake Gakona (ID-4409A)
- USS Lake Garza (ID-4086A)
- USS Lake Gaspar (ID-4086)
- USS Lake Gedney (ID-3765C)
- USS Lake Geneva (ID-4215B)
- USS Lake Harney (ID-4410C)
- USS Lake Harris (ID-4429A)
- USS Lake Helen (ID-4215E)
- USS Lake Huron (ID-2144)
- USS Lake Larga (ID-3765A)
- USS Lake Lasang (ID-3765E)
- USS Lake Lemando (1918)
- USS Lake Lillian (ID-4410E)
- USS Lake Mary (ID-4269)
- USS Lake Michigan (ID-2993)
- USS Lake Moor (ID-2180)
- USS Lake Ontario (ID-2992)
- USS Lake Osweya (ID-4311G)
- USS Lake Otisco (ID-4410F)
- USS Lake Pepin (ID-4215)
- USS Lake Pewaukee (ID-2906)
- USS Lake Placid (ID-1788)
- USS Lake Pleasant (ID-4429)
- USS Lake Shore (ID-1792)
- USS Lake Side (ID-2158)
- USS Lake Silver (1918)
- USS Lake St. Clair (ID-2904)
- USS Lake St. Regis (ID-4261)
- USS Lake Sunapee (ID-4369B)
- USS Lake Superior (ID-2995)
- USS Lake Traverse (ID-2782)
- USS Lake Tulare (ID-2652)
- USS Lake View (ID-2186)
- USS Lake Weston (ID-2926)
- USS Lake Wimico (ID-4410G)
- USS Lake Winooski (ID-4311H)
- USS Lake Wood (ID-2555)
- USS Lake Worth (ID-2997)
- USS Lake Yahara (ID-3974)
- USS Lake Ypsilanti (ID-4114)
- USS Lakehurst (APV-3/APM-1/APM-9)
- USS Lakeland (LSM-373)
- USS Lakeport (ID-2994)
- USS Lakewood Victory (AK-236)

=== Lam–Lc ===
- USS Lamar (AP-92/APA-47, PCE-899)
- USS Lamberton (DD-119/AG-21/DMS-2)
- USS Lamoille River (LSM(R)-512/LFR-512)
- USS Lamons (DE-64, DE-743)
- USS Lamprey (SS-372)
- USS Lamson (DD-18, DD-328, DD-367)
- USS Lancaster (1858, 1862, ID-2953, AK-193)
- USS Lance (AM-257)
- USS Lancetfish (SS-296)
- USS Lancewood (YN-67/AN-48)
- USS Lander (APA-178/LPA-178)
- USS Lang (DD-399, DE-1060/FF-1060)
- USS Langley (CV-1/AV-3, DE‑131, CVL-27)
- USS Lanier (APA-125)
- USS Lanikai (1914)
- USS Laning (DE-159/APD-55/LPR-55)
- USS Lannai (SP-242)
- USS Lansdale (DD-101/DM-6, DD-426, DD-766)
- USS Lansdowne (DD-486)
- USS Lansing (DE-388/WDE-488/DER-388, T-EPF-16)
- USS Lapeer (PC-1138)
- USS Lapon (SS-260, SSN-661)
- USS Lapwing (AM-1/AVP-1, AMS-48/MSC(O)-48)
- USS Laramie (AO-16, T-AO-203)
- USS Laramie River (LSM(R)-513/LFR-513)
- USS Larch (YN-16/AN-21)
- USS Larchmont (PC-487)
- USS Lardner (DD-286, DD-487)
- USS Lariat (AT-130)
- USS Lark (AM-21/AT-168/ATO-168, AMS-23/MSC(O)-23)
- USS Larkspur (1863, 1903)
- USS Las Vegas Victory (AK-229)
- USS Lash (PYc-31)
- USS Lassen (AE-3, DDG-82)
- USS Latimer (APA-152)
- USS Latona (AF-35)
- USS Laub (DD-263, DD-613)
- USS Lauchlan McKay (1943)
- USS Lauderdale (APA-179/LPA-179)
- USS Launcher (YV-2)
- USS Laura Reed (SP-2009)
- USS Laurel (1862, 1915)
- USS Laurens (APA-153)
- Laurent Millaudon (1856)
- USS Laurentia (AF-44/T-AF-44)
- USS Laurinburg (PC-1212)
- USS Lavaca (APA-180)
- USS Lavender (1864)
- USS Lavinia Logan (1861)
- USS Lawford (DE-516)
- USS Lawrence (1813, 1843, DD-8, DD-250, DD-954/DDG-4)
- USS Lawrence C. Taylor (DE-415)
- USS Lawrence County (LST-887)
- USNS Lawrence H. Gianella (T-AOT-1125)
- USS Laws (DD-558)
- USS Lawson (DE-518)
- USS Lawton (1889)
- USS Laysan Island (ARST-1)
- List of LCIs (LCI(L)-1 to LCI(L)-1139)
- USNS LCPL Roy M. Wheat (T-AK-3016)

=== Le ===
- USS Lea (DD-118)
- USS Leader (PYc-42, AM-490/MSO-490)
- USS League Island (YFB-20, AG-149/AKS-30)
- USS Leahy (DLG-16/CG-16)
- USS Leary (DD-158, DD-879/DDR-879)
- USS Lebanon (AG-2, AK-191)
- USS Lee (1775, 1776)
- USS Lee County (LST-888)
- USS Lee Fox (DE-65/APD-45)
- USS Leedstown (AP-73, APA-56)
- USS Leftwich (DD-984)
- USS Legare (1843, WSC-144)
- USS Legonia II (SP-399)
- USS LeHardy (DE-20)
- USS Lehigh (1863, AK-192)
- USS Lejeune (AP-74)
- USS Lelaka (YTB-514/YTM-777)
- USS Leland E. Thomas (DE-420)
- USS Lenah H. Sutcliffe Higbee (DDG-123)
- USS Lenape (ID-2700)
- USS Lenapee (1863)
- USS Lenawee (APA-195)
- USNS Lenni Lenape (T-ATS-9)
- USS Lenoir (AKA-74, PCC-582)
- USS Leo (AKA-60)
- USS Leon (AP-93/APA-48)
- USS Leonard F. Mason (DD-852)
- USS Leonard Wood (AP-25/APA-12)
- USS Leonidas (1861, AD-7)
- USS Leonie (YHB-19)
- USS Leonis (AK-128)
- USS Leopard (IX-122)
- USS Leopold (DE-319)
- USS LeRay Wilson (DE-414)
- USNS Leroy Grumman (T-AO-195)
- USS Leslie (1861, YFB-7)
- USS Leslie L.B. Knox (DE-580)
- USS Lester (DE-1022)
- USS Lesuth (AK-125)
- USS Letitia (SP-398)
- USS Letter B (SP-732)
- USS Leutze (DD-481)
- USS Lev III (YP-157)
- USS Levant (1837)
- USS Levi Woodbury (1837, 1864)
- USS Leviathan (ID-1326)
- USS Levisa (ID-1573)
- USS Levy (DE-162)
- USS Lewis (1861, DE-535)
- USS Lewis and Clark (SSBN-644, T-AKE-1)
- USS Lewis B. Puller (FFG-23, T-MLP-3)
- USS Lewis Hancock (DD-675)
- USS Lewis K. Thurlow (1913)
- USS Lexington (1776, 1825, 1861, CC-1/CV-2, CV-16/CVA-16/CVS-16/CVT-16/AVT-16)
- USS Lexington II (SP-705)
- USS Leyden (1865, IX-167)
- USS Leyte (1887, ARG-8, CV-32/CVA-32/CVS-32/AVT-10)
- USS Leyte Gulf (CG-55)

=== Li–Ll ===
- USS Liberator (1826, 1918, AMc-87/IX-202)
- USS Libertad (1846)
- USS Liberty (1775, ID-3461/AK-35, AG-168/AGTR-5)
- USS Liberty Belle (IX-72)
- USS Liberty III (SP-1229)
- USS Libra (AK-53/AKA-12/LKA-12)
- USS Liddle (DE-76, DE-206/APD-60)
- USS Lightfoot (AM-331)
- USS Lightning (1865)
- USS Lignite (IX-162)
- USS Liguria (AKS-15)
- USS Lilac (1863, 1892)
- USS Lilian (1863)
- USS Lillian Anne (YFB-41)
- USS Lillian II (SP-38)
- USS Lillie B (SP-1502)
- USS Lily (1862)
- USS Limestone (IX-158)
- USS Limpkin (AMc-48, AMS-195/MSC-195)
- USS Lincoln County (LST-898/T-LST-898)
- USS Lincoln Salvor (BARS-9)
- USS Linda (1864)
- USS Linden (1860, WAGL-228)
- USS Lindenwald (APM-6/LSD-6/T-LSD-6)
- USS Lindsay (DE-519)
- USS Lindsey (DD-771/DM-32/MMD-32)
- USS Ling (SS-297/AGSS-297/IXSS-297)
- USS Lingayen (CVE-126)
- USS Linn County (LST-900)
- USS Linnet (1814, AM-76/IX-166, AM-417, AMS-24/MSC(O)-24)
- USS Linta (SP-721)
- USS Lioba (AF-36)
- USS Lioness (1857)
- USS Lionfish (SS-298/AGSS-298)
- USS Lipan (AT-85/ATF-85/T-ATF-85/WMEC-85)
- USS Liscome Bay (CVE-56)
- USS Liston (IX-92)
- USS Litchfield (DD-336/AG-95)
- USS Litchfield County (LST-901)
- USS Little (DD-79/APD-4, DD-803)
- USS Little Ada (1864)
- USS Little Aie (SP-60)
- USS Little Belt (1812)
- USS Little Brothers (SP-921)
- USS Little Compton (YF-864)
- USS Little Rebel (1859)
- USS Little Rock (CL-92/CLG-4/CG-4, LCS-9)
- USS Little Sisters (SP-2530)
- USS Littlehales (AGS-7, AGSC-15, T-AGS-52)
- USS Lively (YT-14)
- USS Livermore (DD-429)
- USS Livingston (AP-163/AK-222)
- USS Lizardfish (SS-373)
- USS Lloyd (DE-209/APD-63)
- USS Lloyd E. Acree (DE-356)
- USS Lloyd Thomas (DE-312, DE-374, DD-764/DDE-764)

=== Lo ===
- USS Locator (YAGR-6/AGR-6)
- USS Lockwood (DE-1064/FF-1064)
- USS Locust (1910, YN-17/AN-22)
- USS Lodestone (ADG-8)
- USS Lodona (1862)
- USS Loeser (DE-680)
- USS Lofberg (DD-759)
- USS Logan (APA-196/LPA-196)
- USNS Logan's Fort (T-AO-160)
- USS Loggerhead (SS-374/AGSS-374)
- USS Logic (AM-258)
- USS Lomado (SP-636)
- USS Lone Jack (T-AO-161)
- USS Lone Wolf (YT-179/YTB-179)
- USS Long (DD-209/DMS-12)
- USS Long Beach (ID-2136/AK-9, PG-142/PF-34, CLGN-160/CGN-160/CGN-9)
- USS Long Island (SP-572, AVG-1/ACV-1/CVE-1, SSN-809)
- USS Longshaw (DD-559)
- USS Longspur (AMc-10, AM-404, AMCU-28/MHC-28)
- USNS Longview (T-AGM-3)
- USS Lonoto (YT-407/YTB-407/YTM-407)
- USS Lookout (YAGR-2/AGR-2)
- USS Lorain (APR-6, YT-330, APA-99, PF-97, PF-93)
- USS Lorain County (LST-1177)
- USS Lorikeet (AMc-49, AMS-49/MSC(O)-49)
- USS Loring (DE-520)
- USS Los Alamos (AFDB-7)
- USS Los Angeles (ID-1470, ZR-3, CA-135, SSN-688)
- USS Lossie (PG-108)
- USS Lot M. Morrill (1889)
- USS Louden (PC-1213)
- USS Lough (DE-586)
- USS Louis (DE-517)
- USS Louis H. Wilson Jr. (DDG-126)
- USS Louis McLane (1861)
- USS Louise No. 2 (SP-1230)
- USS Louisiana (1812, 1861, BB-19, BB-71, SSBN-743)
- USS Louisville (1862, ID-1644, CL-28/CA-28, SSN-724)
- USS Lovelace (DE-198)
- USS Lovering (DE-39, DE-272)
- USS Lowe (DE-325/WDE-425/DER-325)
- USS Lowell (SP-504)
- USS Lowndes (APA-154/LPA-154)
- USS Lowry (DD-770)
- USS Loy (DE-160/APD-56)
- USS Loyal (T-AGOS-22)
- USS Loyalty (AMc-88, AM-457/MSO-457)

=== Ls–Ly ===
- List of LSMs (LSM-1 through LSM-558, including all LSM(R)s)
- List of LSTs (LST-1 through LST-1070)
- USNS Lt. George W. G. Boyce (T-AK-251)
- USNS Lt. James E. Robinson (T-AKV-3/T-AG-170/T-AK-274)
- USNS Lt. Raymond O. Beaudoin (T-AP-189)
- USNS Lt. Robert Craig (T-AK-252)
- USS Lt. Thomas W. Fowler (YOG-107)
- USNS LTC Calvin P. Titus (T-AK-5089)
- USS LTC John U. D. Page (T-AK-4496)
- USS Lu-O-La (SP-520)
- USS Lubbock (APA-197)
- USS Luce (DD-99/DM-4, DD-522, DL-7/DLG-7/DDG-38)
- USS Luce Bros. (SP-846)
- USS Lucia (1912)
- USS Lucid (AM-259, AM-458/MSO-458)
- USS Lucidor (AF-45)
- USS Lucille Ross (SP-1211)
- USNS Lucy Stone (T-AO-209)
- USS Ludington (PC-1079)
- USS Ludlow (1808, DD-112/DM-10, DD-438)
- USS Luella (1917)
- USS Luiseno (AT-156/ATF-156)
- USS Lumen (AKA-30)
- USS Luna (AKS-7)
- USS Lunga Point (CVE-94/CVU-94/AKV-32)
- USS Lupin (1861)
- USCGC Lupine (WAGL-230)
- USS Luster (IX-82)
- USS Luzerne (APA-243)
- USS Luzerne County (LST-902)
- USS Luzon (PG-47/PR-7, ARG-2)
- USS Lycoming (APA-155)
- USS Lydia (SP-62, ID-3524)
- USS Lydia III (SP-676)
- USS Lydonia (SP-700,SP-734)
- USS Lykens (SP-876/AT-56)
- USS Lyman (DE-302)
- USS Lyman County (LST-903)
- USS Lyman K. Swenson (DD-729)
- USS Lynch (1776, T-AGOR-7)
- USNS Lynchburg (T-AO-154)
- USS Lynde McCormick (DD-958/DDG-8)
- USS Lyndon B. Johnson (DDG-1002)
- USS Lyndonia (SP-734)
- USNS Lynn (T-AG-182)
- USS Lynnhaven (YF-328)
- USS Lynx (1814, SP-2, AK-100)
- USS Lynx II (SP-730)
- USS Lyon (AP-71)
- USS Lyon County (LST-904)
- USS Lyra (AK-101)
