= USS Woodbury =

Four ships in the United States Navy have been named USS Woodbury, after the Supreme Court justice Levi Woodbury.

- USRC Woodbury (1837) was a revenue cutter, launched in 1837 and sold in 1847
- USRC Woodbury (1864) was a revenue cutter, placed into service in 1864 and decommissioned in 1915
- USS Woodbury (DD-309), was a destroyer, commissioned in 1920 and decommissioned in 1923; she ran aground at Honda Point, California, on 8 September 1923 as part of the Honda Point disaster, the largest peacetime loss of U.S. Navy ships in history. All of her crew survived; the rock she grounded on is now known as Woodbury Rock.
- USS Woodbury (WSC-155), was built in 1927, served in the United States Coast Guard, until 1941 when she transferred to the Navy. She was decommissioned and sold in 1948.

== See also ==
- USS Levi Woodbury
