= 3250 =

3250 or variation, may refer to:

== In general ==
- A.D. 3250, a year in the 4th millennium CE
- 3250 BC, a year in the 4th millennium BCE
- 3250, a number in the 3000 (number) range

== Other uses ==
- 3250 Martebo, an asteroid in the Asteroid Belt, the 3250th asteroid registered
- Nokia 3250, a cellphone
- Texas Farm to Market Road 3250, a state highway
- AMD Ryzen 3 3250U

== See also ==
- USS Lagoda (SP-3250), a WWI U.S. Navy patrol vessel
