= USS Longspur =

USS Longspur may refer to the following ships of the United States Navy:

- USS Longspur (AMc-10), was acquired by the US Navy 30 October 1940 and placed out of service 12 August 1944
- The contract to build Longspur (AM‑404) was canceled 12 August 1945
- USS Longspur (AMCU-28), was launched as LCI(L)‑884 20 October 1944, renamed and redesignated Longspur (AMCU‑28) on 7 March 1952 and scrapped 22 June 1960
