= USS Leader =

USS Leader may refer to the following ships of the United States Navy:

- USS Leader (PYc-42), a patrol craft commissioned 24 October 1942
- USS Leader (MSO-490), a fleet minesweeper commissioned 16 November 1955
