= USS Lancaster =

USS Lancaster may refer to the following ships of the United States Navy:

- USS Lancaster (1855), was a sidewheel steamship built in 1855 and purchased by the US Navy in 1862. She was converted to a ram, served in the American Civil War and sunk in battle in March 1863
- USS Lancaster (1858), was a screw sloop launched in 1858 and served until transferred to the US Treasury Department for use as a quarantine ship in 1913
- USS Lancaster (ID-2953), was a cargo ship launched in 1918 and immediately pressed into service transporting supplies and then returning World War I troops from Europe. She was decommissioned in 1919.
- USS Lancaster (AK-193), was a cargo ship during World War II, from July 1944 to November 1945
