= USS Lydia =

USS Lydia has been the name of more than one United States Navy ship, and may refer to:

- USS Lydia (SP-62), a patrol vessel in commission from 1917 to 1919
- Service: Served as a dispatch and harbor patrol boat in Boston and later as a messenger and dispatch boat in Norfolk, Virginia.
- Decommissioned: April 10, 1919, and returned to its owner
- Type: Patrol vessel.
- Commissioned: August 18, 1917
- USS Lydia (ID-3524), a cargo ship in commission from 1918 to 1919
- Type: Cargo ship.
- Acquisition: Acquired by the Navy in 1918 from the U.S. Shipping Board.
- Commissioned: October 26, 1918.
- Service: Assigned to the Naval Overseas Transportation Service, carrying aviation steel and general supplies to France and later food supplies to the Mediterranean.
