= USS Leyden =

USS Leyden has been the name of more than one United States Navy ship, and may refer to:

- USS Leyden (1865), an armed tug in commission from 1866 to 1903
- USS Leyden (IX-167), a naval auxiliary in commission from 1944 to 1945
