= USS Lee =

USS Lee may refer to the following ships of the United States Navy:

- USS Lee (1775) was a schooner chartered by the Continental Navy in October 1775 and returned to her owner November 1777
- USS Lee (1776) was a galley in service to the Continental Navy during September–October 1776
