= USS Lilian =

USS Lilian or USS Lillian may refer to the following United States Navy ships:

- USS Lilian (1863), a steamer in commission from 1864 to 1865
- USS Lillian II (SP-38), a patrol boat in commission in 1917
