= USS League Island =

USS League Island is a name used more than once by the U.S. Navy:

- USS League Island (YFB-20), was built in April 1907 by Neafie & Levy S. and E. B. Co., Philadelphia, Pennsylvania.
- USS League Island (AG-149) was originally LST-1097 launched 16 January 1945.
