= USS Long Island =

Three ships of the United States Navy have been named USS Long Island, after Long Island, New York.

- USS Long Island (SP-572) was a steam trawler purchased by the US Navy 18 April 1917 and sold 1 December 1919
- USS Long Island (CVE-1) was a Long Island-class escort carrier launched 11 January 1940 and sold 24 April 1947
- USS Long Island (SSN-809) will be a Virginia-class submarine expected to enter service at an unspecified date.

One ship of the United States Coast Guard was also named USCGC Long Island, also after Long Island, New York.

- USCGC Long Island, an Island-class patrol boat in service from 1991 to 2015. She is now in service with the Costa Rican Coast Guard as Juan Rafael Mora Porras.
