= USS Loyalty =

USS Loyalty may refer to the following ships of the United States Navy:

- USS Loyalty (AMc-88), was a coastal minesweeper launched 23 August 1941 and decommissioned 4 December 1945
- USS Loyalty (AM-457), was a minesweeper launched 22 November 1953 and struck 1 July 1972
