= USS Lu-O-La =

Patrol vessel of the United States Navy

History

United States
- Name: USS Lu-O-La
- Namesake: Previous name retained
- Builder: George Lawley & Son, Neponset, Massachusetts
- Completed: 1912
- Acquired: Leased 1 May 1917; Delivered 24 August 1917
- Commissioned: 17 September 1917
- Decommissioned: 10 January 1919
- Fate: Returned to owner 10 January 1919
- Notes: Operated as private motorboat Lu-O-La 1912-1917 and from 1919

General characteristics
- Type: Patrol vessel
- Tonnage: 6 gross register tons
- Length: 50 ft (15 m)
- Beam: 7 ft 9 in (2.36 m)
- Draft: 1 ft 9 in (0.53 m)
- Speed: 18 knots
- Complement: 6
- Armament: 1 × .30-caliber (7.62-mm) machine gun

USS Lu-O-La (SP-520) was a United States Navy patrol vessel in commission from 1917 to 1919.

Lu-O-La was built in 1912 as a private motorboat of the same name by George Lawley & Son at Neponset, Massachusetts. On 1 May 1917, the U.S. Navy acquired her under a free lease from her owner, James Sprunt of Wilmington, North Carolina, for use as a section patrol vessel during World War I. She was enrolled in the Naval Coast Defense Reserve on 8 June 1917, taken over by the Navy on 24 August 1917, and commissioned as USS Lu-O-La (SP-520) on 17 September 1917 at Wilmington.

Assigned to the 6th Naval District, Lu-O-La was based at Wilmington and operated on section patrol duty through the end of World War I. Serving as a dispatch boat and harbor boat, she performed messenger duty out of Wilmington and patrolled between Wilmington and Cape Fear, North Carolina, while engaged in dispatch duty.

Lu-O-La was decommissioned on 10 January 1919 and returned to Sprunt the same day.
