= USS Lovering =

USS Lovering has been the name of multiple United States Navy ships, and may refer to:

- USS Lovering (DE-272), a destroyer escort transferred to the United Kingdom upon completion in 1943 which served in the Royal Navy as HMS Gould (K476) from 1943 until sunk in 1944
- USS Lovering (DE-39), a destroyer escort in commission from 1943 to 1945
