= USS Lorain =

USS Lorain has been the name of multiple ships of the United States Navy ship, in honor of Lorain, Ohio.

- USS Lorain (APR‑6) was canceled 12 March 1943, prior to the start of construction.
- USS YT-330 was a yard tug that was named Lorain in civilian use prior to acquisition by the Navy on 19 October 1942.
- USS Lorain (APA-99) was a Bayfield-class attack transport renamed USS Dade in 1943 while under construction.
- USS Lorain (PF-97) was a Tacoma-class patrol frigate, originally named USS Roanoke (PG-201), cancelled in 1944 before construction could begin.
- USS Lorain (PF-93) was also a Tacoma-class patrol frigate, originally named USS Vallejo (PG-205), in commission from 1945 to 1946.
