= USS Lily =

Tugboat of the United States Navy

History

United States
- Ordered: as Jessie Benton
- Acquired: 30 September 1862
- In service: 19 October 1862
- Fate: Sunk, 28 May 1863

General characteristics
- Displacement: 50 long tons (50 t)
- Propulsion: steam engine

USS Lily, originally built as Jessie Benton, was a tugboat acquired by the Union Navy during the American Civil War. It was used by the Navy to patrol navigable waterways of the Confederacy to prevent the South from trading with other countries.

== Service history ==
Lily, a steam tugboat, was built as Jessie Benton, and purchased by the War Department 5 May 1862. Used by the Quartermaster Corps on the western rivers, she was known as Jessie until transferred to the Navy 30 September 1862 and renamed Lily on 19 October 1862. Assigned to Rear Admiral David Dixon Porter’s Mississippi Squadron, she served on the river, including duty during the Vicksburg campaign. Lily sank near Chickasaw Bayou in the Yazoo River in collision with the ironclad ram USS Choctaw on 28 May 1863.
