= USS Lehigh =

USS Lehigh may refer to the following ships of the United States Navy:

- USS Lehigh (1863), was launched 17 January 1863, decommissioned 8 September 1898 and sold 14 April 1904
- USS Lehigh (AK-192), was launched 25 November 1944 and decommissioned 6 November 1945
