= USS LST-904 =

Tank landing ship

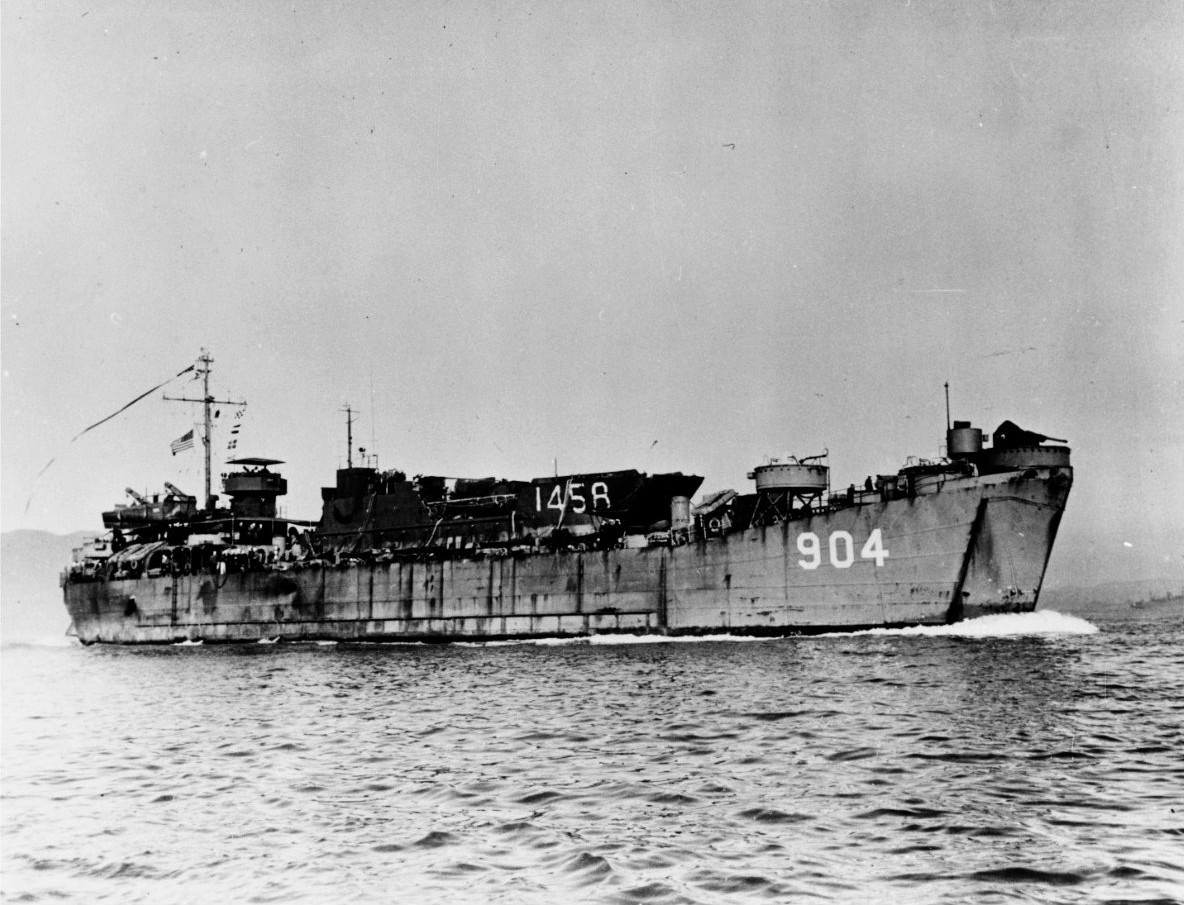
- LST-904 entering San Francisco Bay in 1946

History

United States
- Name: USS LST-904
- Builder: Dravo Corporation, Pittsburgh
- Laid down: 12 November 1944
- Launched: 23 December 1944
- Commissioned: 25 January 1945
- Decommissioned: 15 November 1946
- Renamed: USS Lyon County (LST-904), 1 July 1955
- Stricken: 31 December 1958
- Honors and awards: 1 battle star (World War II)
- Fate: Sunk as a target, 13 May 1959

General characteristics
- Class & type: LST-542-class tank landing ship
- Displacement: 1,625 long tons (1,651 t) light; 3,640 long tons (3,698 t) full
- Length: 328 ft (100 m)
- Beam: 50 ft (15 m)
- Draft: Unloaded : 2 ft 4 in (0.71 m) forward; 7 ft 6 in (2.29 m) aft; Loaded : 8 ft 2 in (2.49 m) forward; 14 ft 1 in (4.29 m) aft
- Propulsion: 2 × General Motors 12-567 diesel engines, two shafts, twin rudders
- Speed: 12 knots (22 km/h; 14 mph)
- Boats & landing craft carried: 2 × LCVPs
- Troops: Approximately 130 officers and enlisted men
- Complement: 8-10 officers, 89-100 enlisted men
- Armament: 8 × 40 mm guns; 4 × 20 mm guns

USS Lyon County (LST-904) was an LST-542-class tank landing ship built for the United States Navy during World War II. Named after counties in Iowa, Kansas, Kentucky, Minnesota, and Nevada, she was the only U.S. Naval vessel to bear the name.

Originally laid down as USS LST-904 by the Dravo Corporation of Pittsburgh, Pennsylvania, on 12 November 1944; launched on 23 December 1944; sponsored by Miss Betty McCallen; and commissioned at New Orleans, Louisiana, on 25 January 1945.

== Service history ==
=== World War II, 1945 ===
Following shakedown in the Gulf of Mexico, LST-904 loaded cargo at New Orleans and departed on 1 March for the Pacific. She reached Pearl Harbor on 2 April, thence sailed in convoy on 16 April via Eniwetok and Guam to Saipan where she arrived on 12 May. There she embarked Army Signal Corps troops and equipment, and on 12 June steamed to the Ryukyu Islands. Reaching Okinawa the 18th, from 23 to 28 June she beached at Ie Shima before returning to Hagushi to complete cargo operations. In addition she embarked marines for transfer to the Marianas. Departing on 10 July, she touched Guam the 16th and arrived Saipan two days later for availability. Between 30 July and 2 August, LST-904 steamed to Iwo Jima where she loaded a cargo of steel pilings.

=== Post-war activities, 1945–1946 ===
After returning to Saipan the 23rd, she headed for Okinawa on 29 August and began discharging cargo on 4 September. Unloading completed, she embarked men of the Fifth Air Force and carried them to Yokohama, Japan, between 29 September and 4 October. Between 12 October and 8 November she sailed to the Philippine Islands and transported additional occupation troops to Japan. She operated along the Japanese coast from Aomori to Yokohama until departing for the Marianas on 7 December. She reached Saipan on 13 December, thence steamed via Guam to Pearl Harbor where she arrived on 21 January 1946.

After loading LCT-1458 on her main deck, LST-904 departed for San Francisco on 29 January. She arrived in early February and operated along the west coast until 10 July when she was placed in commission, in reserve with the 19th Fleet.

=== Decommissioning and disposal ===
LST-904 decommissioned on 15 November 1946 and joined the Pacific Reserve Fleet in the Columbia River. She was named USS Lyon County (LST-904) on 1 July 1955. On 20 October 1958 the Secretary of the Navy recommended that she be used as a target to destruction. Her name was struck from the Naval Vessel Register on 1 November. Towed to Bremerton, Washington, on 31 December, her hulk was sunk in 1,280 fathoms of water off the coast of Washington on 13 May 1959 by torpedoes fired from the Capitaine (SS-336).

== Awards ==
LST-904 received one battle star for World War II service.
