= USS Lavender =

Tugboat of the United States Navy

History

United States
- Ordered: as Mayflower
- Launched: 1864
- Acquired: 25 May 1864
- Commissioned: June 1864
- Fate: Sunk 12 June 1864

General characteristics
- Displacement: 173 tons
- Length: 112 ft (34 m)
- Beam: 22 ft (6.7 m)
- Draft: 7 ft 6 in (2.29 m)
- Propulsion: steam engine; screw-propelled
- Complement: 23
- Armament: two 24-pounder guns

USS Lavender was a steamer acquired by the Union Navy during the American Civil War. She was used by the Navy as a tugboat.

== Service history ==
Lavender, a tug built at Philadelphia, Pennsylvania, in 1864 as Mayflower, was purchased there by the Navy on 25 May 1864. Ordered to proceed off Charleston, South Carolina, for duty with the South Atlantic Blockading Squadron, Lavender, acting Master John H. Gleason in command, departed the Delaware Capes on 11 June 1864.

Shortly before midnight on the 12th, she struck a reef off North Carolina during a severe squall. Efforts to get her free were thwarted when water entered her engine room and put out her fires. The wooden steamer was completely wrecked and nine of her crew were lost before Army steamer John Farrow rescued 14 survivors three days later.
