= USS Liberty Belle =

History

United States
- Name: Liberty Belle
- Builder: Harlan & Hollingsworth
- Launched: 1910
- Acquired: 23 April 1942
- In service: 1 January 1943
- Out of service: 18 May 1944
- Fate: Sold, scrapped 1974

General characteristics
- Displacement: 622 tons
- Length: 198 ft (60 m)
- Beam: 44 ft (13 m)
- Draft: 12 ft (3.7 m)

Liberty Belle (IX-72) was built in 1910 by Harlan & Hollingsworth, Wilmington, Del.; acquired by the US Navy 23 April 1942 from the Wilson Line on a bareboat charter; and placed in service 1 January 1943 for duty in the 5th Naval District.

Assigned to experimental duty, Liberty Belle operated out of the Naval Mine Warfare Test Station, Solomons, Maryland, until early May 1944 when she sailed for Philadelphia. Arriving there, she was placed out of service 18 May 1944, and was returned to the Maritime Commission 10 April 1947. She was subsequently sold to Jersey Shore Lines of Atlantic Highlands, N.J., and renamed Asbury Park.
