= USS Larkspur =

History

United States
- Ordered: as Pontiac
- Laid down: date unknown
- Launched: 1863
- Acquired: 6 October 1863
- Commissioned: 16 October 1863
- Decommissioned: 8 July 1865
- Stricken: 1865 (est.)
- Fate: Sold, 10 August 1865

General characteristics
- Displacement: 121 tons
- Length: 90 ft 9 in (27.66 m)
- Beam: 19 ft 2 in (5.84 m)
- Draught: 7 ft 3 in (2.21 m)
- Propulsion: steam engine; screw-propelled
- Speed: 9 knots
- Complement: 26
- Armament: one 12-pounder howitzer; one 12-pounder rifled gun

USS Larkspur was a steamer acquired by the Union Navy during the American Civil War. She was used by the Navy as a tugboat.

Larkspur was built in 1863 at Wilmington, Delaware, as Pontiac; purchased by the Navy at Wilmington from W. A. James & Co. 6 October 1863; delivered on the 12th; and commissioned at Philadelphia Navy Yard 16 October 1863, acting Ens. Francis B. Davis in command.

== Assigned to the South Atlantic Blockade ==
The new tug was assigned to the South Atlantic Blockading Squadron and had arrived Port Royal, South Carolina, by 1 November. She served there during most of the remainder of the Civil War towing and repairing the ships of the blockade, steaming along the Confederate coast gathering information about activity ashore, carrying messages between ships of the squadron, and providing countless other services which helped the Union Navy to strangle the South.

On 8 December she was ordered to St. Simons Sound, Georgia, to seek word of General William Tecumseh Sherman’s army which was expected to emerge from the Georgia hinterland ending his famous march to the sea. Four days later she was sent to Savannah, Georgia, to assist the Union Army after it reached the sea.

== Final operations, decommissioning and civilian career ==
During the remainder of the war the tug operated at Charleston, South Carolina, and Port Royal. She departed the latter port 27 June 1865 for Philadelphia, Pennsylvania, where she decommissioned 8 July. Larkspur was sold at public auction Philadelphia 10 August and redocumented as Larkspur 5 September 1865. She was renamed M. Vandercook 13 September 1883 and again renamed Somerville 27 April 1898. The tug was finally abandoned in 1905.
