= USS Lynch =

USS Lynch is a name used more than once by the U.S. Navy:

- USS Lynch (1776), a fishing schooner chartered by order of General George Washington 26 January 1776.
- USNS Lynch (T-AGOR-7), an oceanographic research ship acquired by the U.S. Navy in 1965 and scrapped in 2001
