= USS Limpkin =

USS Limpkin may refer to the following ships of the United States Navy:

- USS Limpkin (AMc-48), launched 5 April 1941 and placed out of service 15 April 1946
- USS Limpkin (MSC-195), launched 22 May 1954 and struck 1 May 1976
