= USS Lebanon =

USS Lebanon may refer to:

- USS Lebanon (AG-2), was a collier acquired by the US Navy 6 April 1898 and sold 2 June 1922
- USS Lebanon (AK-191), was a cargo ship acquired by the US Navy 25 August 1945 and decommissioned 15 November 1946
