= USS Laurentia =

Cargo ship of the United States Navy

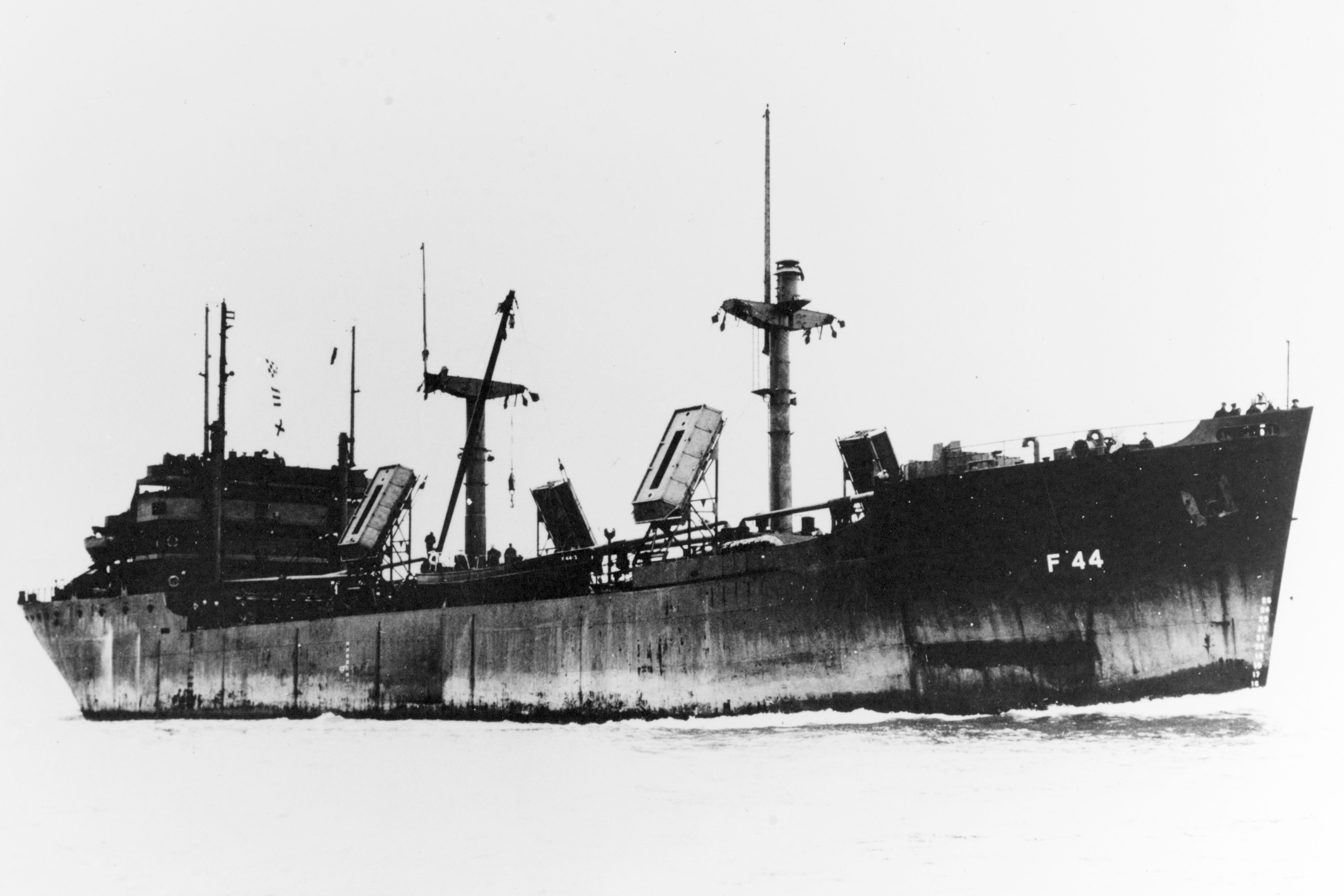

History

United States
- Ordered: as Wall and Crown; R1-M-AV3 hull, MC hull 2206
- Laid down: 23 October 1944
- Launched: 12 December 1944
- Acquired: 19 May 1945
- Commissioned: as USS Laurentia (AF-44), 5 June 1945
- Decommissioned: 18 June 1946
- In service: as USNS Laurentia (T-AF-44); 1 July 1950
- Out of service: 1970
- Fate: broken up for scrapping in 1973

General characteristics
- Tonnage: 2,120 long tons deadweight (DWT)
- Displacement: 3,139 t.(lt) 6,240 t.(fl)
- Length: 338 ft (103 m)
- Beam: 50 ft (15 m)
- Draught: 18 ft (5.5 m)
- Propulsion: diesel engine, single screw, 1,700shp
- Speed: 12 kts. (max)
- Complement: 84
- Armament: one single 3 in (76 mm) dual purpose gun mount, six single 20 mm gun mounts

USS Laurentia (AF-44) was an Adria-class stores ship in service with the United States Navy from 1945 to 1946 and from 1950 to 1970. She was scrapped in 1973.

== History ==
Laurentia was laid down under United States Maritime Commission contract by Pennsylvania Shipyards, Inc., Beaumont, Texas, 23 October 1944; launched 12 December 1944; sponsored by Mrs. Oscar Hayes; acquired by the Navy 19 May 1945 for transfer to Galveston, Texas; and commissioned 5 June 1945.

=== World War II service ===
After shakedown, Laurentia loaded frozen and refrigerated provisions at Mobile, Alabama, and departed for the Pacific Ocean 27 June. She reached Pearl Harbor 11 July; discharged cargo; then sailed 7 August to carry cold stores to American bases in the Marshalls, the Marianas, and the Palaus. She returned to Pearl Harbor 28 September carrying 250 veterans of the Pacific fighting. After loading more cargo, she sailed for the Philippines 6 October. She reached Tacloban, Leyte, the 23d and supplied ships in Leyte Gulf until sailing for the United States 9 November. She arrived San Francisco, California, 2 December.

Laurentia stocked her cold storage holds and deployed for the Far East 14 December. She reached Yokosuka, Japan, 10 January 1946. During almost the next 3 months she provisioned ships out of Yokosuka and supported occupation operations along the eastern coast of Honshū. She then returned to the U.S. West Coast, arriving at San Francisco 15 May.

=== U.S. Army service ===
Decommissioning there 18 June, she was returned to the War Shipping Administration. On 6 November the Maritime Commission transferred her to the United States Army under bareboat charter for supply operations in the Pacific.

=== Military Sea Transportation Service ===
Reacquired by the Navy 1 July 1950, Laurentia was assigned to Military Sea Transportation Service and reclassified T-AF-44. Crewed by civilians, she operated in the Far East during the Korean War. Based at Yokohama and Kobe, Japan, she provisioned American ships in various Japanese ports and steamed the vital sea supply line between Japan and South Korea while carrying supplies to Inchon and Pusan. She continued this important duty until departing Yokohama for the United States 27 February 1954. Steaming via Pearl Harbor and the Panama Canal Zone, she reached New Orleans, Louisiana, 9 April. After loading provisions, she sailed 10 May on a circular supply run to American bases in the Caribbean, principally to the Panama Canal Zone, the Virgin Islands, and Puerto Rico. Since 1954 she maintained this pattern of operations out of New Orleans and Mobile, and she continued to serve in the Caribbean and the Gulf of Mexico with MSTS.

=== Decommissioning and fate ===
Laurentia was placed out of service in 1970 and struck from the Naval Vessel Register (date unknown). Final Disposition: broken up for scrapping in 1973.

== Military awards and honors ==
Laurentia's crew was eligible for the following medals:

- American Campaign Medal
- Asiatic–Pacific Campaign Medal
- World War II Victory Medal
- Navy Occupation Service Medal (with Asia clasp)
- National Defense Service Medal
- Philippines Liberation Medal
