= USS Lomado =

Patrol vessel of the United States Navy

History

United States
- Name: USS Lomado
- Namesake: Previous name retained
- Builder: F. S. Nook, East Greenwich, Rhode Island
- Completed: 1916
- Acquired: Purchased 18 May 1917; Delivered 29 May 1917
- Commissioned: 1 June 1917
- Fate: Sold 30 June 1919
- Notes: Operated as private motor yacht Lomado 1916-1917

General characteristics
- Type: Patrol vessel
- Tonnage: 63 gross register tons
- Length: 69 ft (21 m)
- Beam: 15 ft 10 in (4.83 m)
- Draft: 3 ft 10 in (1.17 m)
- Speed: 9.5 knots
- Complement: 10
- Armament: 1 × .30-caliber (7.62-mm) machine gun

USS Lomado (SP-636) was a United States Navy patrol vessel in commission from 1917 to 1919.

Lomado was built as a private motor yacht of the same name by F. S. Nook at East Greenwich, Rhode Island, in 1916. On 18 May 1917, the U.S. Navy purchased her from Frederick T. Rogers of Providence, Rhode Island, for use as a section patrol boat during World War I. Rogers delivered her to the Navy on 29 May 1917, and she was commissioned as USS Lomado (SP-636) on 1 June 1917. Lomado was enrolled in the Naval Coast Defense Reserve on 5 June 1917.

Assigned to the 2nd Naval District in southern New England, Lomado served as a section and shore patrol boat based at New Bedford, Massachusetts, for the rest of World War I. She patrolled the coast from Buzzards Bay in Massachusetts to Narragansett Bay in Rhode Island. She also trained men for duty in section patrol boats.

Lomado was sold to John J. Hanson of Jersey City, New Jersey, on 30 June 1919.
