= USS Lang =

USS Lang may refer to the following ships of the United States Navy:

- USS Lang (DD-399) was a destroyer, commissioned in 1939 and decommissioned in 1946.
- USS Lang (FF-1060) was a destroyer escort, commissioned in 1971 and decommissioned in 1991.
