= USS Luce Bros. =

Patrol vessel of the United States Navy

History

United States
- Name: USS Luce Bros.
- Namesake: Previous name retained
- Builder: Alberton & Douglas Machine Company, New London, Connecticut
- Completed: 1877
- Acquired: Acquired 3 May 1917; Delivered July 1917
- Commissioned: 9 August 1917
- Decommissioned: 24 January 1919
- Fate: Returned to owner 28 March 1919
- Notes: Operated as commercial fishing trawler Luce Bros. 1877-1917 and from 1919

General characteristics
- Type: Patrol vessel
- Tonnage: 67 or 141 Gross register tons
- Length: 122 ft (37 m)
- Beam: 19 ft 6 in (5.94 m)
- Draft: 12 ft (3.7 m)
- Speed: 11 knots
- Complement: 26
- Armament: None

USS Luce Bros. (SP-846) was a United States Navy patrol vessel in commission from 1917 to 1919.

Luce Bros. was built as a commercial "Menhaden Fisherman"-type fishing trawler of the same name in 1877 by the Alberton & Douglas Machine Company at New London, Connecticut. She was rebuilt in 1912–1913 by the White Shipbuilding Company at Sharptown, Maryland.

On 3 May 1917, the U.S. Navy acquired Luce Bros. from her owner, the Dennis Fish & Oil Company of Cape Charles, Virginia, for use as a section patrol boat during World War I. The Navy took delivery of her in July 1917, and she was commissioned at Berkley, Virginia, as USS Luce Bros. (SP-846) on 9 August 1917.

Assigned to the 5th Naval District and based at Norfolk, Virginia, Luce Bros. served in the Norfolk and Hampton Roads area on harbor patrol and guard ship duty and in naval intelligence operations for the rest of World War I.

Luce Bros. was decommissioned on 24 January 1919 and returned to the Dennis Fish & Oil Company on 28 March 1919.
