= USS Liddle =

Two ships of the United States Navy (USN) have been named USS Liddle. They are the following;

- USS Liddle (DE-76), a Buckley-class destroyer escort transferred to the United Kingdom and renamed HMS Bligh and entered service in 1943. The ship was returned to the US in 1945 and sold for ship breaking in 1946.
- USS Liddle (DE-206), a Buckley-class destroyer escort that served with the USN from 1943 to 1967.
