= USS LST-888 =

1944 LST-542-class tank landing ship

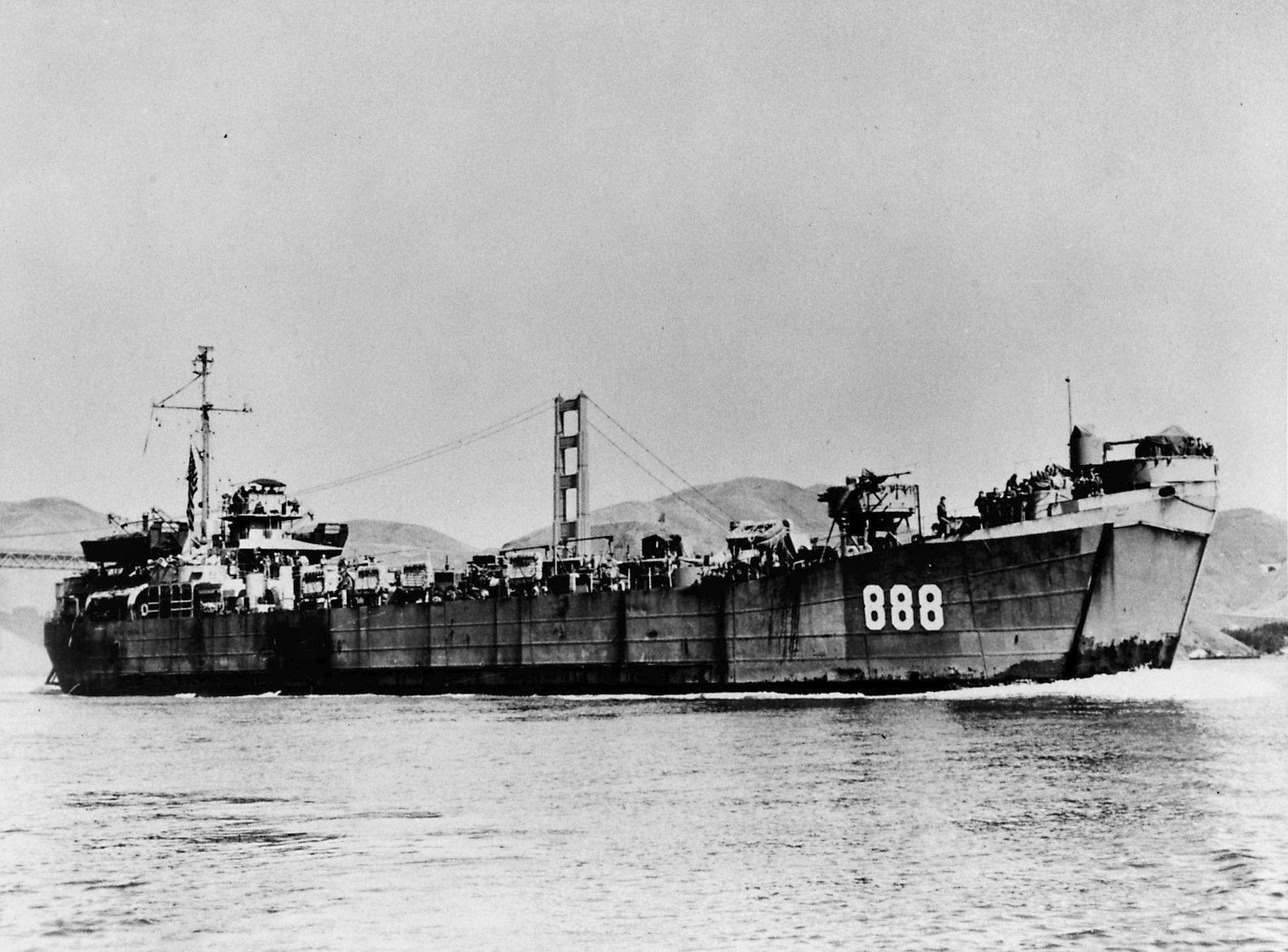
- LST-888 entering San Francisco Bay in early 1946

History

United States
- Name: USS LST-888
- Builder: Dravo Corporation, Pittsburgh
- Laid down: 11 August 1944
- Launched: 14 October 1944
- Commissioned: 13 November 1944
- Decommissioned: 2 September 1946
- Renamed: USS Lee County (LST-888), 1 July 1955
- Stricken: 21 September 1960
- Honours and awards: 1 battle star (World War II)
- Fate: Sold for scrapping, 18 April 1961

General characteristics
- Class & type: LST-542-class tank landing ship
- Displacement: 1,625 long tons (1,651 t) light; 4,080 long tons (4,145 t) full
- Length: 328 ft (100 m)
- Beam: 50 ft (15 m)
- Draft: Unloaded : 2 ft 4 in (0.71 m) forward; 7 ft 6 in (2.29 m) aft; Loaded : 8 ft 2 in (2.49 m) forward; 14 ft 1 in (4.29 m) aft
- Propulsion: 2 × General Motors 12-567 diesel engines, two shafts, twin rudders
- Speed: 12 knots (22 km/h; 14 mph)
- Boats & landing craft carried: 2 × LCVPs
- Troops: Approximately 130 officers and enlisted men
- Complement: 8-10 officers, 89-100 enlisted men
- Armament: 8 × 40 mm guns; 12 × 20 mm guns

USS LST-888 was an LST-542-class tank landing ship built for the United States Navy during World War II. Late in her career she was renamed Lee County (LST-888) – after counties in twelve Southern and Midwestern states, the only U.S. Naval vessel to bear that name – but saw no active service under that name.

Originally laid down as LST-888 by the Dravo Corporation of Pittsburgh, Pennsylvania on 11 August 1944; launched on 14 October 1944, sponsored by Mrs. Richard Connell; and commissioned at New Orleans, Louisiana on 13 November 1944.

== Service history ==
=== World War II ===
After shakedown and training off Panama City, Florida, LST-888 departed New Orleans on 14 December 1944 for duty in the western Pacific Ocean. Steaming via the Panama Canal and San Diego, she arrived at Pearl Harbor on 16 January 1945 and there embarked Army troops and vehicles before sailing for the Philippines on 27 January. She arrived at Leyte Gulf via Eniwetok on 25 February and joined in intensive preparations for the decisive amphibious operations in the Ryukyu Islands. LST-888 departed in convoy from Leyte Gulf on 19 March, and a week later she reached Kerama Retto to debark troops at Geruma Shima and Tokashiki Jima. Following the invasion of Okinawa on 1 April, she sailed for Ulithi on 29 April after completing supply operations out of Ie Shima. She reached Ulithi on 5 May. For the remainder of the war, she made supply runs which took her to Okinawa, Iwo Jima, Saipan, and Guam.

=== Post-war activities ===
Departing Saipan on 14 September 1945, LST-888 steamed to Sasebo, Japan, arriving on 22 September to support occupation operations on Kyūshū. She operated out of Sasebo and Nagasaki for the next six months. After steaming to Yokohama, she sailed for the United States on 11 April 1946. Touching at Guam and Pearl Harbor, she reached San Francisco on 27 May. In July she sailed for the east coast and began limited coastal operations out of Little Creek, Virginia.

=== Decommissioning and sale ===
LST-888 was decommissioned at Charleston, South Carolina, on 2 September 1946 and was towed to Green Cove Springs, Florida, where she entered the Atlantic Reserve Fleet. Named USS Lee County (LST-888) on 1 July 1955, she was struck from the Naval Vessel Register and approved for disposal on 21 September 1960. She was sold to Gulf Tampa Drydock, Inc. of Tampa, Florida, on 18 April 1961. She was towed away for scrapping on 11 May 1961.

== Awards ==
LST-888 received one battle star for World War II service.
