= USS Delta (1864) =

Tugboat of the United States Navy

History

United States
- Name: USS Delta
- Acquired: 3 June 1864
- In service: 1864
- Out of service: 1865
- Fate: Sold, 5 September 1865

General characteristics
- Type: Tugboat
- Displacement: 50 long tons (51 t)
- Length: 66 ft (20 m)
- Beam: 14 ft (4.3 m)
- Draft: 7 ft 8 in (2.34 m)
- Depth of hold: 6 ft (1.8 m)
- Propulsion: Steam engine
- Speed: 9 kn (10 mph; 17 km/h)
- Armament: 1 × spar torpedo

USS Delta was a steamship used by the Union Navy during the American Civil War. She was used by the Navy to patrol navigable waterways of the Confederacy to prevent the South from trading with other countries.

== Service history ==
Delta — a steam tugboat — was purchased as Linda at Philadelphia, Pennsylvania, 3 June 1864, and renamed Delta on 27 November. She was also known as Tug No. 4. Delta was sent to Hampton Roads, Virginia, to be fitted as a torpedo (mine) tug, and operated in the James River until 28 March 1865. She was transferred to the sounds of North Carolina for duty, and for a short time in April 1865 was placed at the disposal of the Union Army with four other torpedo tugs. Delta was sent to New York at the close of the war and sold there on 5 September.
