= USS Lucid =

USS Lucid may refer to the following ships of the United States Navy:

- USS Lucid (AM-259), was launched 5 June 1943 and transferred to China 28 August 1945
- USS Lucid (MSO-458), was launched 14 November 1953, sold to private owners 1 November 1976, and in refurbishment as a museum ship in Stockton, California since 15 March 2012.
