= USS Leslie L. B. Knox =

Rudderow-class destroyer escort

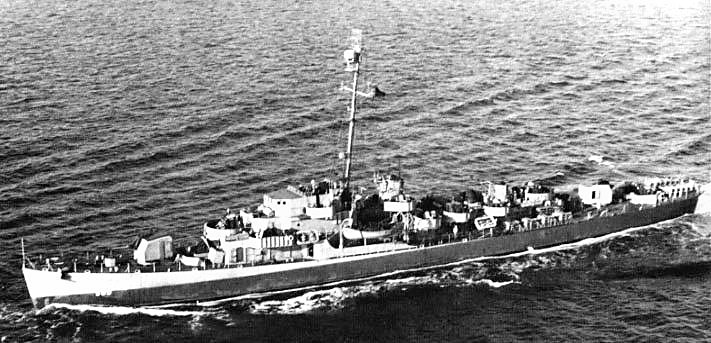

History

United States
- Name: USS Leslie L. B. Knox
- Namesake: Leslie L. B. Knox
- Builder: Bethlehem Hingham Shipyard
- Laid down: 7 November 1943
- Launched: 8 January 1944
- Commissioned: 22 March 1944
- Decommissioned: 15 June 1946
- Honors and awards: three battle stars
- Fate: Scrapped, 1973

General characteristics
- Type: Rudderow-class destroyer escort
- Displacement: 1,740 tons (1,770 metric tons) (fully loaded)
- Length: 306 ft (93.3 m) (overall)
- Beam: 36 ft 6 in (11.1 m)
- Draft: 11 ft (3.4 m) (fully loaded)
- Propulsion: General Electric steam turbo-electric drive engine
- Speed: 24 knots
- Range: 5,500 nautical miles at 15 knots (10,200 km at 28 km/h)
- Complement: Officers: 15; Enlisted: 198
- Sensors & processing systems: Radar: SL surface search; Sonar: Type 128D or Type 144 both in retractable dome.
- Armament: 2 x 5 inch /38 dual purpose mount; 4 x Bofors 40 mm L/60 gun. 10 x Oerlikon 20 mm cannon single mounts; 3 x 21 inch (533 mm) torpedo tubes; Hedgehog, ca. 200 depth charges.

USS Leslie L. B. Knox (DE-580) was a Rudderow-class destroyer escort in service with the United States Navy from 1944 to 1946. She was scrapped in 1973.

== Namesake ==
Leslie Lockhart Bruce Knox was born on 17 November 1916 in Brisbane, Australia. He enlisted in the U.S. Navy as seaman second class at New York City on 28 April 1939, and was appointed as aviation cadet on 20 September. After flight training at Naval Air Station Pensacola, Florida, he was commissioned Ensign on 12 June 1940 and reported to Scouting Squadron 41 at Norfolk, Virginia.

On 15 March 1941 he was transferred to VF-42 and, except for temporary duty with Fighting Squadron 41, remained with that unit until his death in the Battle of the Coral Sea on 8 May 1942. He was posthumously promoted to Lieutenant (junior grade) on 25 June 1942 and awarded the Navy Cross for "extraordinary heroism and conspicuous courage as pilot of an aircraft of a Fighting Squadron in action against enemy Japanese forces, in the Battle of the Coral Sea...On that evening, as one of the fighters launched to oppose enemy Japanese aircraft in the vicinity of his ship, Ensign Knox attacked a formation of seven enemy aircraft, shooting down one and assisting...in dispersing the others. In this engagement, he displayed unusual skill and devotion to duty, carrying out his mission with determination and aggressiveness against great enemy odds and with complete disregard for his own personal safety."

== Construction and service ==
Leslie L. B. Knox was laid down 7 November 1943 by the Bethlehem Hingham Shipyard, Inc., Hingham, Massachusetts; launched 8 January 1944; sponsored by Louise Kennedy Knox, widow of the ship's namesake and commissioned 22 March 1944.

=== Battle of the Atlantic ===
After shakedown out of Bermuda, the new destroyer escort was assigned to Escort Division 67, Atlantic Fleet. Following two runs escorting coastal convoys between New York and Norfolk, Virginia, she departed Hampton Roads 24 June 1944 on the first of two round-trip voyages escorting convoys to Bizerte, Tunisia. Returning from the second voyage, she arrived New York 16 October for repairs.

=== Pacific War ===
Leslie L. B. Knox steamed from New York and 3 November rendezvoused with Escort Division 67 en route to the Pacific. After transiting the Panama Canal and touching the Galapagos, Society, and Solomon Islands, she arrived Hollandia, New Guinea, 11 December.

From December 1944 through June 1945, the ship was engaged in convoy escort duty, ASW patrols, and mail runs in the New Guinea and Philippine waters. She received her first battle star for convoy escort duty from Hollandia to Leyte Gulf 3 to 14 January 1945 in support of the Lingayen Gulf landing. During this mission, the convoy fought off Japanese kamikaze planes so that only one merchant ship was damaged.

After the successful Lingayen Gulf landing, Leslie L. B. Knox continued convoy-escort and mail-run duties, earning two more battle stars for her work in the Manila Bay-Bicol Operation and the campaign to liberate the southern Philippine Islands. After V-J Day, she steamed to Okinawa, arriving 7 September 1945 for occupation duty and service along the coast of China. During this period the ship called at Jinsen, Korea, and Shanghai and Qingdao, China.

=== Postwar ===
She departed 14 October for the United States, arriving San Diego 5 November. Leslie L. B. Knox was decommissioned on 15 June 1946, and entered the Pacific Reserve Fleet at San Diego. Later she was berthed at Stockton, California. Leslie L. B. Knox received three battle stars for World War II service. She was scrapped in 1973.

== See also ==
- List of destroyer escorts of the United States Navy
