= USNS Lucy Stone =

John Lewis-class oiler

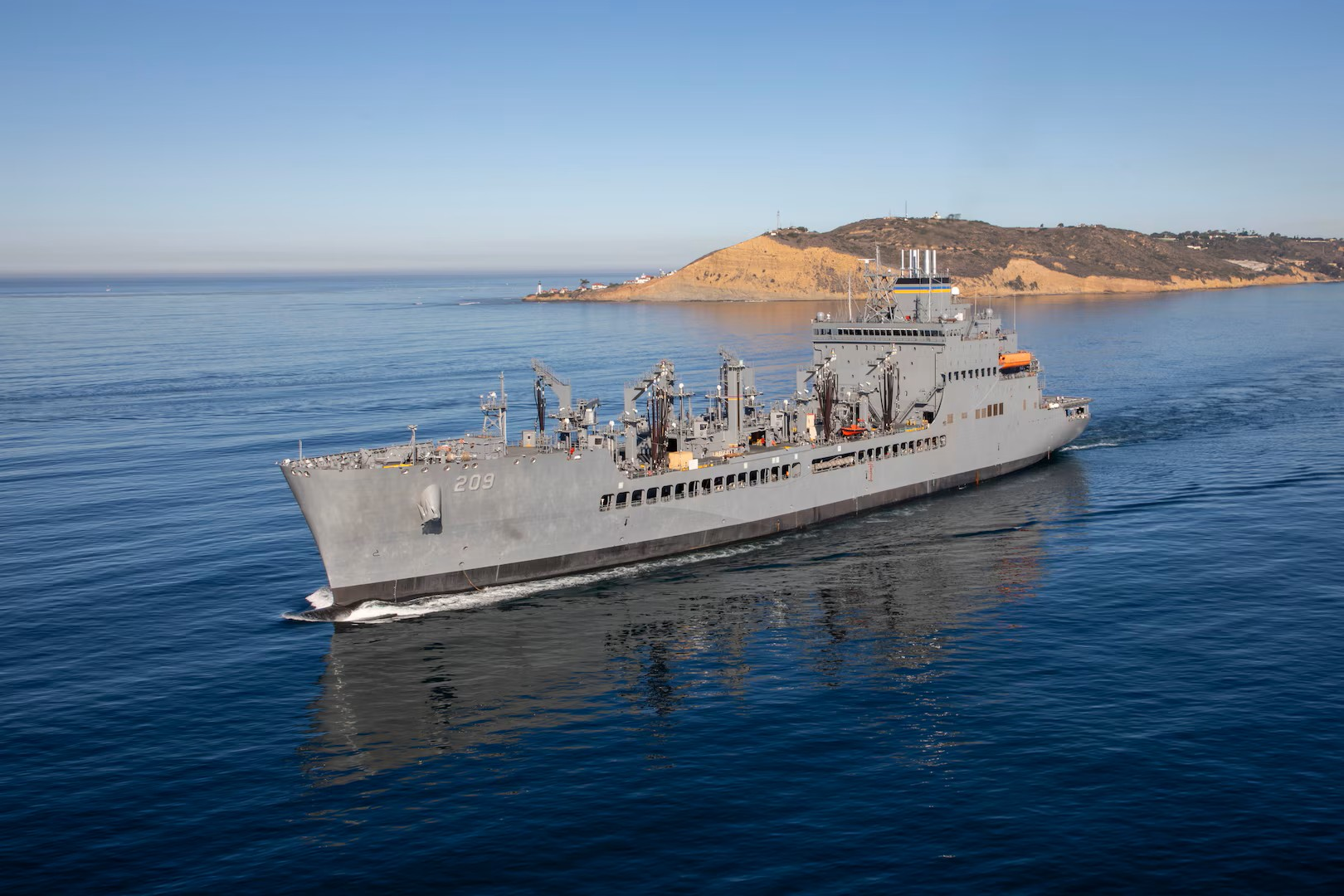
- Lucy Stone during her sea trials in 2025

History

United States
- Name: Lucy Stone
- Namesake: Lucy Stone
- Awarded: 2015
- Builder: National Steel and Shipbuilding Company, San Diego, California
- Laid down: 8 August 2023
- Launched: 21 September 2024
- Christened: 21 September 2024
- Identification: Hull number: T-AO-209
- Motto: Equality and Justice
- Status: Active
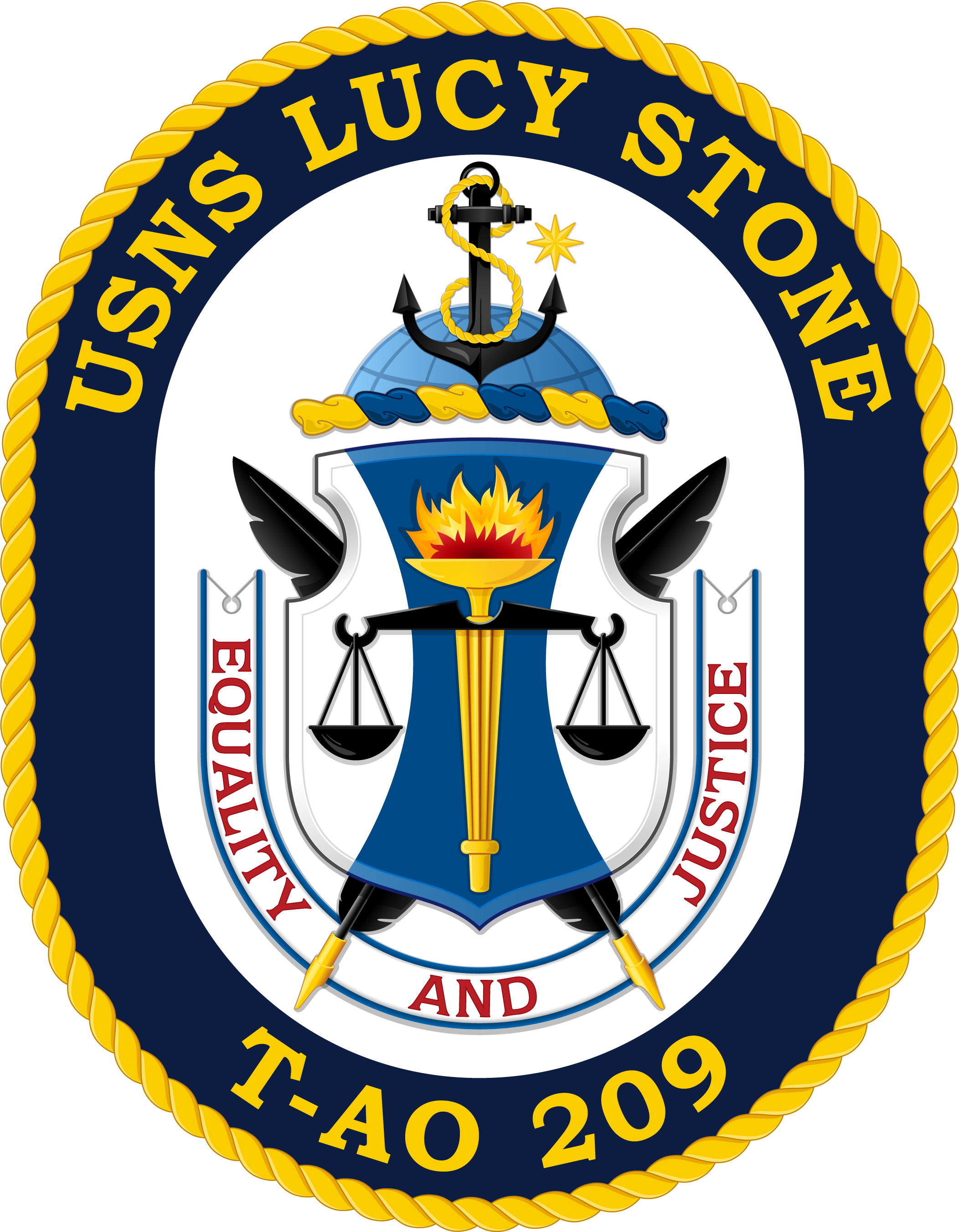
- Badge

General characteristics
- Class & type: John Lewis-class replenishment oiler
- Displacement: 22,515 t (22,159 long tons) (Light ship)
- Length: 746 ft (227 m)
- Beam: 106 ft (32 m)
- Draft: 33.5 ft (10.2 m)
- Speed: 20 knots (37 km/h; 23 mph)
- Complement: 99 civilian mariners (CIVMARS)

USNS Lucy Stone (T-AO-209) is a John Lewis-class replenishment oiler planned to be operated by the Military Sealift Command to logistically support the United States Navy. She was launched in 2024 and is named after activist Lucy Stone.

== History ==
Like the rest of her sister ships, the John Lewis class is intended to replace the older Henry J. Kaiser-class replenishment oilers and is heavily based on the former's design. As replenishment oilers, the vessels transport fuel and cargo to other ships at sea to extend their range and capabilities.

Initially known as T-AO-209, she was ordered in 2015 from NASSCO along with the first six ships of the class at an estimated cost of $800 million apiece. The next year, she was named after 19th-century abolitionist and suffragist Lucy Stone, which followed a theme of naming the oilers after activists. Her keel was laid down on 8 August 2023 at the company's San Diego shipyard and was both launched and christened on 21 September 2024.

In June 2025 , Secretary of Defense Pete Hegseth announced plans to rename several ships to reflect his priorities. Lucy Stone and several other John Lewis-class oilers were listed for review and potential renaming.

The USNS Lucy Stone was accepted by the Navy and placed into active service on 16 December 2025.
