= USS Laburnum =

Tugboat of the United States Navy

History

United States
- Ordered: as Lion
- Laid down: date unknown
- Launched: 1864
- Acquired: 24 June 1864
- Commissioned: 7 July 1864
- Decommissioned: 24 January 1866
- Stricken: 1866 (est.)
- Fate: Sold, 16 March 1866

General characteristics
- Displacement: 181 tons
- Length: 110 ft (34 m)
- Beam: 22 ft (6.7 m)
- Draught: 9 ft (2.7 m)
- Propulsion: steam engine; screw-propelled
- Speed: 10 knots
- Complement: 29
- Armament: two 20-pounder Parrott rifles; two 24-pounder howitzers

USS Laburnum was a steamer acquired by the Union Navy during the American Civil War. She was used by the Navy as a tugboat and dispatch boat to serve Union ships on blockade duty.

Lion, a screw tug built at Philadelphia, Pennsylvania, in 1864, was purchased by the Navy 24 June 1864, renamed Laburnum, and commissioned at Philadelphia Navy Yard 7 July 1864.

== Assigned to the South Atlantic Blockade ==
The new tug joined the South Atlantic Blockading Squadron at Port Royal, South Carolina, 17 July 1864. For the remainder of the Civil War she operated in the vicinity of Charleston, South Carolina, on blockade duty and assisting other ships of the squadron towing and acting as dispatch vessel. Such modest but vital service by ships contributed greatly to the effectiveness of the blockade which ultimately strangled the Confederacy and restored peace to the divided nation.

On 15 February Laburnum captured a boat with seven men from blockade runner Sylph which had run aground on Sullivan’s Island while attempting to escape from Charleston and the tentacles of General W. T. Sherman’s army. Four days later, after the South had evacuated Charleston, Laburnum began removing obstructions between Mount Pleasant, South Carolina, and Fort Sumter and she continued to labor restoring order to the waters of South Carolina until after the end of the war.

== Post-war decommissioning and civilian maritime career ==
Laburnum decommissioned 24 January 1866 and was sold at auction in New York City to L. J. Belloni 16 March 1866. The tug was redocumented as D. P. Ingraham 14 May 1866 and served commercial shipping until sold to a foreign purchaser in 1878.
