= USS Luster =

History

United States
- Name: USS Luster
- Builder: M. M. Davis & Sons, Solomons, Maryland
- Launched: 1936
- Acquired: by purchase, 21 July 1942
- Commissioned: 14 August 1942
- Decommissioned: 24 March 1943
- Recommissioned: 22 January 1944
- Decommissioned: 26 June 1944
- Renamed: Luster, 2 September 1942
- Fate: Transferred to War Shipping Administration for disposal, 20 December 1944

General characteristics
- Type: Patrol boat
- Displacement: 68 long tons (69 t)
- Length: 82 ft 6 in (25.15 m)
- Beam: 20 ft (6.1 m)
- Draft: 5 ft 6 in (1.68 m)
- Speed: 8 knots (15 km/h; 9.2 mph)
- Complement: 4

USS Luster (IX‑82), was a yacht which served in the United States Navy as a patrol boat during World War II.

She was built as Ko‑Asa in 1936 by M. M. Davis & Sons of Solomons, Maryland, and purchased by the Navy from George Marshall Allen of New York City on 21 July 1942; and placed in service on 14 August 1942.

== Service history ==
Renamed Luster on 2 September 1942, the converted yacht was assigned to the 7th Naval District Local Defense Force, Port Everglades section, on 14 August. She was attached to the Gulf Sea Frontier Force primarily for ASW patrols on the east coast of Florida.

She was placed out of service on 24 March 1943, and assigned to the Supervisor of Salvage, USN, Miami, on 22 January 1944 to be operated by Merritt-Chapman & Scott Corp. with a civilian crew.

She was placed out of service a second time on 26 June 1944 and laid up at Coast Guard Patrol Base, Port Everglades. She was transferred to the War Shipping Administration on 20 December 1944 and sold.
