= USS Lowell =

Patrol vessel of the United States Navy

History

United States
- Name: USS Lowell
- Namesake: Previous name retained
- Builder: Verdin's Yard, Staten Island, New York (as Steam lighter) 1909; Shewan’s Dry Dock Company, Brooklyn, New York (as tug) 1917
- Completed: 1909; rebuilt 1917
- Acquired: 29 September 1917
- Commissioned: 29 September 1917
- Decommissioned: 26 May 1919
- Fate: Returned to owner 26 May 1919
- Notes: Operated as commercial steam lighter Lowell 1909-1917 and as commercial tug Lowell 1917 and from 1919

General characteristics
- Type: Patrol vessel and Minesweeper
- Displacement: 249 tons
- Length: 119 ft 4 in (36.37 m)
- Beam: 29 ft (8.8 m)
- Draft: 9 ft (2.7 m)
- Propulsion: Steam engine
- Speed: 9 knots
- Complement: 20
- Armament: None

USS Lowell (SP-504) was a United States Navy patrol vessel and minesweeper in commission from 1917 to 1919.

Lowell was built as a commercial steam lighter of the same name in 1909 by Verdin's Yard at Staten Island, New York. In 1917 she was rebuilt as a steam tug by Shewan’s Dry Dock Company at Brooklyn, New York.

The U.S. Navy acquired Lowell under charter from her owner, Neptune Line, Inc., of New York City, on 29 September 1917 for World War I service as a patrol vessel and minesweeper. The Navy took control of her and commissioned her the same day at Tompkinsville on Staten Island as USS Lowell (SP-504).

Assigned to the 3rd Naval District, Lowell operated out of New York Harbor for the remainder of World War I as a dispatch boat and harbor patrol craft. In addition, she operated as a minesweeper and swept for naval mines in The Narrows and off southern Long Island.

After the war, Lowell was decommissioned on 16 May 1919 and was returned to the Neptune Line the same day.
