= USS Lenoir =

USS Lenoir may refer to the following ships of the United States Navy:

- USS Lenoir (AKA-74), was launched 6 November 1944, decommissioned 13 June 1946 and sold in 1947
- USS Lenoir (PC-582), was launched 15 July 1942 as PC-582, named Lenoir 1 February 1956 and struck from the Navy list 1 July 1960
