= USS Little Brothers =

Tugboat of the United States Navy

History

United States
- Name: USS Little Brothers
- Namesake: Previous name retained
- Builder: George Bishop, Patchogue, New York
- Completed: 1910
- Acquired: Acquired 21 July 1917; Delivered 13 August 1917
- Commissioned: 20 August 1917
- Decommissioned: 14 August 1919
- Fate: Returned to owner 26 August 1919
- Notes: Operated as commercial fishing vessel Little Briothers 1910-1917 and from 1919

General characteristics
- Type: Tug
- Tonnage: 30 Gross register tons
- Length: 70 ft (21 m)
- Beam: 17 ft 5 in (5.31 m)
- Draft: 5 ft 9 in (1.75 m)
- Speed: 10 knots
- Complement: 8
- Armament: None

USS Little Brothers (SP-921) was a United States Navy tug in commission from 1917 to 1919.

Little Brothers was built as a commercial fishing vessel of the same name in 1910 by George Bishop at Patchogue, New York. On 21 July 1917, the U.S. Navy chartered her from her owner, John C. Doxsee of Islip, New York, for use as a tug during World War I. Assigned the section patrol number 921, she was enrolled in the Naval Coast Defense Reserve on 3 August 1917, delivered to the Navy on 13 August 1917, and commissioned at New York City as USS Little Brothers (SP-921) on 20 August 1917.

Assigned to the 3rd Naval District and based at New York City, Little Brothers was employed in carrying military supplies and ammunition for the rest of World War I and into 1919. She operated in the East River, New York Harbor, Gravesend Bay, Jamaica Bay, and Long Island Sound.

Little Brothers was decommissioned on 14 August 1919. She was returned to Doxsee on 26 August 1919.
