= USS Lake Tulare =

Cargo ship of the United States Navy

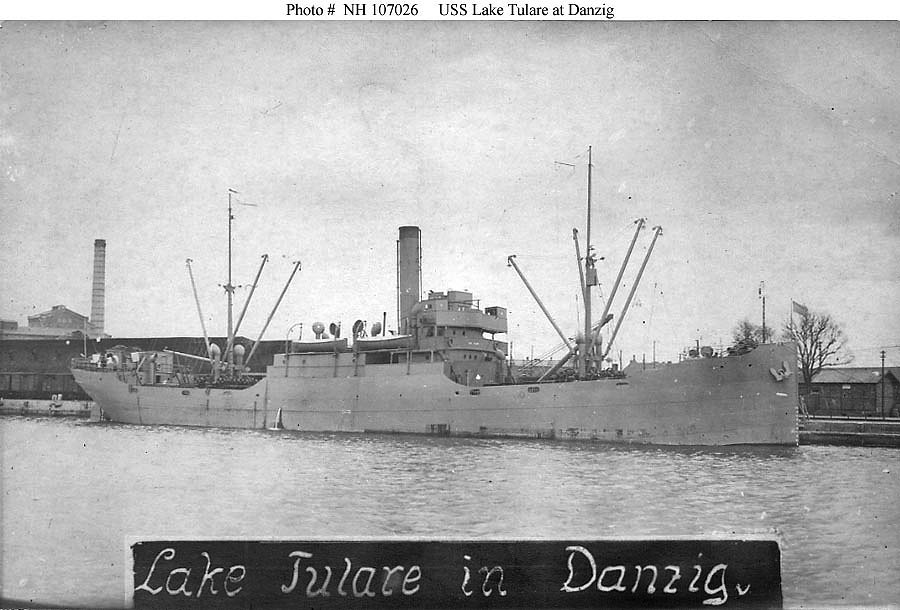
- Lake Tulare at Danzig, Germany in 1919 while operating under the control of the United States Food Administration.

History

United States
- Name: USS Lake Tulare
- Namesake: Tulare Lake in Kings County, California (previous name retained)
- Builder: Superior Shipbuilding Company, Superior, Wisconsin
- Yard number: 530
- Laid down: 1917
- Launched: 15 December 1917
- Completed: April 1918
- Acquired: 19 October 1918 (Delivered to Navy)
- Commissioned: 19 October 1918
- Out of service: 1 March 1919 (transferred to U.S. Food Administration)
- Reinstated: 14 July 1919 (transferred back to U.S. Navy)
- Decommissioned: 15 September 1919
- Identification: Official number: 216066; Signal letters: LJTD
- Fate: Transferred to 15 September 1919
- Notes: Owned by the U.S. Shipping Board, operated under U.S. Army control as SS Lake Tulare 1918 then Navy. Sold commercial 1919, SS Lake Tulare 1919–1924, SS Bestik 1924–1931, and SS Hai Hsiang 1931–1941; Sunk 8 December 1941; Raised and scrapped 1946

General characteristics
- Type: Cargo ship
- Tonnage: 2,005 GRT
- Displacement: 1,196
- Length: 261 ft 0 in (79.55 m) LOA; 251 ft (76.5 m) LBP
- Beam: 43 ft 6 in (13.26 m)
- Draft: 17 ft 9 in (5.41 m)
- Depth of hold: 20 ft (6.1 m)
- Propulsion: One 1,200-ihp (895 kW steam engine, one shaft
- Speed: 12 knots (22 km/h; 14 mph)
- Complement: 28 civilian service; 56 Navy service
- Armament: 1 × 3-inch, 50 cal gun

SS Lake Tulare at the Superior Shipbuilding Company yard in Superior, Wisconsin, on 24 April 1918.

USS Lake Tulare (ID-2652) (/tʊˈlɛəri/) was a cargo ship of the United States Navy that served during World War I and its immediate aftermath.

== Construction and acquisition ==
Lake Tulare was laid down under a United States Shipping Board (USSB) contract as the commercial cargo ship SS War Valour in 1917 by the Superior Shipbuilding Company in Superior, Wisconsin as hull number 530. Her name was changed to SS Lake Tulare while she was under construction, and she was launched on 15 December 1917 and completed in April 1918.

On registration the 2,005 GRT ship was given official number 216066 and signal letters LJTD. Lake Tulare was 261 ft (79.6 m) length overall, 251 ft (76.5 m) length between perpendiculars, 43 ft 6 in (13.3 m) breadth, 17 ft 9 in (5.4 m) mean draft, depth of hold 20 ft (6.1 m) and registry crew number of 28. Ownership remained with USSB during subsequent military service until sold in 1919.

After her completion in 1918, the United States Army acquired her for use as a cargo ship.

== U.S. Navy career ==
The U.S. Navy acquired Lake Tulare from the Army for use during World War I and assigned her the naval registry identification number 2652. Lake Tulare was delivered to the Navy and commissioned as USS Lake Tulare (ID-2652) at Cardiff, Wales on 19 October 1918. (Note: DANFS has 10 October, a possible typographical mistake as other Navy references have 19 October date.)

The ship, armed with one 3-inch, 50 cal gun, was assigned to the Naval Overseas Transportation Service (NOTS) for use as a coal transport between ports in the United Kingdom and France. (Note: NavSource has a 5" gun, but 1918 Navy Construction & Repair source is very specific with this ship having 1 3" while adjacent ships have that and 5".) Operating out of Cardiff, a major coal port, she performed these duties through the end of the war in November 1918 and into 1919.

Transferred to the United States Food Administration and the American Relief Administration on 1 March 1919, Lake Tulare and many of ships of its class supported the USFA and the ARA as a part of reconstruction programs for war-ravaged Eastern Europe. In particular, the "Lake Tulare" carried food aid from British and French ports to various ports in Europe, among them Rotterdam in the Netherlands, Danzig, Germany, and both Liepāja and Riga in Latvia. She served as a relief ship until 14 July 1919, when the Food Administration returned her to the Navy and she resumed military cargo runs.

== Decommissioning and disposal ==
After steaming to New York City in the late summer of 1919, Lake Tulare was decommissioned on 15 September 1919 and was returned to the U.S. Shipping Board the same day.

== Later career ==
The Shipping Board sold Lake Tulare to the International Coal Transportation Company of New York City in 1919 which owned the ship into 1923. That year the ship was sold to K. Th. Einersen of Kristiana, Norway. In 1924, she was sold to Skibs. A/S Manitowoc, also of Kristiana, and renamed Bestik. In 1931, Bestik was sold to the China Merchants Navigation Company of Shanghai, China, and renamed Hai Hsiang. Hai Hsiang was sold again in 1938, to William Hunt and Company, Ltd., of Shanghai.

On 8 December 1941, Japanese aircraft bombed and sank Hai Hsiang at Sichuan, China. Her wreck was raised in 1946 and scrapped.
