= Lillian Anne =

History

United States
- Name: Lillian Anne
- Namesake: Previous name retained
- Builder: Delaware River Iron Ship Building and Engine Works, (Chester, Pennsylvania)
- Completed: 1895
- Acquired: 1942
- In service: 6 December 1942
- Out of service: 9 July 1943
- Fate: Returned to owner 9 July 1943

General characteristics
- Type: Ferry
- Tonnage: 330 Gross register tons
- Length: 160 ft (49 m)

Lillian Anne (YFB-41) was a United States Navy ferry in service from 1942 to 1943.

Lillian Anne was built as Riverside in 1895 by the Delaware River Iron Ship Building and Engine Works at Chester, Pennsylvania. The U.S. Navy acquired Lillian Anne from her owner, Captain R. W. Gatewood of Norfolk, Virginia, under a bare-boat charter in 1942 and placed in service as Lillian Anne (YFB-41) on 6 December 1942.

Lillian Anne served in the 5th Naval District until 9 July 1943, when she was placed out of service and returned to her owner.
