= USS Laramie =

USS Laramie or USNS Laramie has been the name of more than one United States Navy ship:

- USS Laramie (AO-16), a fleet replenishment oiler in commission from 1921 to 1922 and from 1940 to 1945.
- USNS Laramie (T-AO-203), a fleet replenishment oiler in service with the Military Sealift Command since 1996
