= USS Lodestone =

Degaussing vessel of the United States Navy

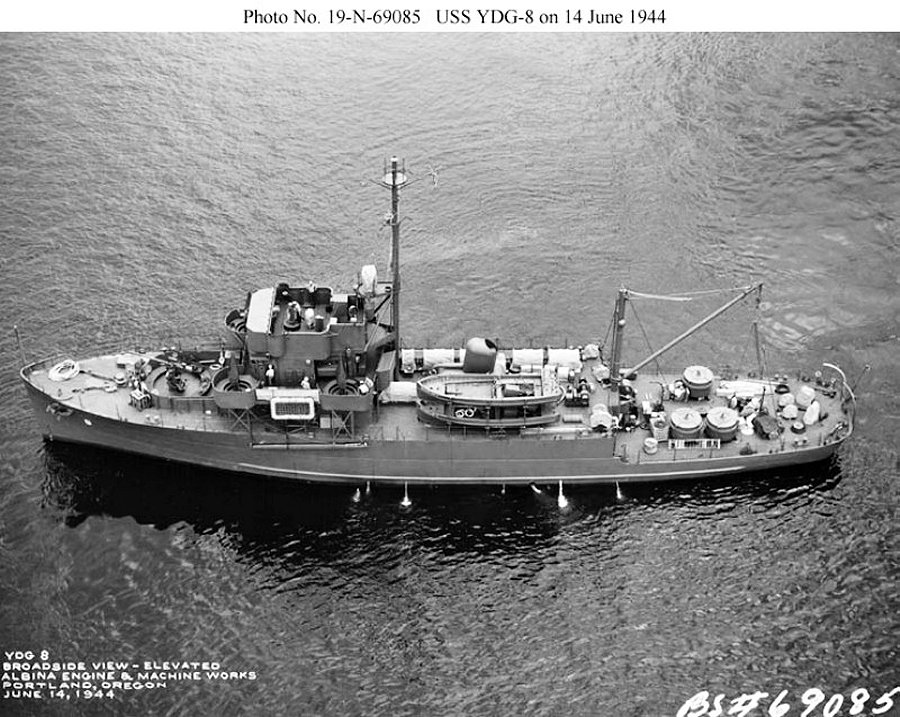

History

United States
- Name: USS Lodestone
- Builder: Albina Engine and Machine Works, Portland
- Laid down: 27 May 1943
- Launched: 30 September 1943
- Commissioned: 10 July 1944
- Decommissioned: May 1946
- Renamed: Lodestone, 1 February 1955
- Reclassified: YDG-8, 23 December 1943
- Stricken: 21 February 1975
- Fate: Scrapped, 1 May 1976

General characteristics
- Displacement: 640 long tons (650 t)
- Length: 184 ft 6 in (56.24 m)
- Beam: 34 ft (10 m)
- Draft: 9 ft (2.7 m)
- Speed: 14 knots (26 km/h; 16 mph)
- Complement: 65
- Armament: 1 × 3"/50 caliber gun; 4 × single 20 mm guns

USS Lodestone (ADG-8) was a degaussing vessel of the United States Navy, named after the mineral lodestone. Originally planned as a patrol craft escort (PCE-876), she was laid down on 27 May 1943 by the Albina Engine & Machine Works of Portland, Oregon; launched 30 September 1943; reclassified YDG-8 on 23 December 1943; and commissioned 10 July 1944.

== Service history ==
After shakedown YDG-8 departed San Pedro, California on 18 August for the South Pacific. She operated out of Tulagi until early October when she joined the 7th Fleet, arriving Manus, Admiralty Islands, 6 October. For the rest of the war YDG-8 provided degaussing services in the Pacific Islands, primarily at Manus and in the Philippines. After the war she returned to the United States and decommissioned in May 1946. She joined the Reserve Fleet and was berthed at San Diego, California. Reclassified ADG-8 on 1 November 1947, she was named Lodestone on 1 February 1955.

Struck from the Naval Register on 21 February 1975, Lodestone was scrapped 1 May 1976.
