= USS Locust =

USS Locust is a name used more than once by the U.S. Navy:

- USS Locust (1910), a tugboat placed in service 5 April 1910.
- USS Locust (AN-22), a net laying ship launched 1 February 1941.
