= USS L. A. Dempsey =

Patrol vessel of the United States Navy

History

United States
- Name: USS L. A. Dempsey
- Namesake: Previous name retained
- Completed: 1890
- Acquired: 13 September 1917
- Commissioned: 1917
- Decommissioned: 11 July 1919
- Fate: Returned to owner 11 July 1919
- Notes: Operated as commercial tug Mascot and L. A. Dempsey 1890-1917 and from 1919

General characteristics
- Type: Patrol vessel and tug
- Tonnage: 41 Gross register tons
- Length: 62 ft 6 in (19.05 m)
- Beam: 15 ft 10 in (4.83 m)
- Draft: 6 ft 6 in (1.98 m)
- Speed: 7.8 knots
- Complement: 8
- Armament: 1 × 3-pounder

USS L. A. Dempsey (SP-1231) was a United States Navy armed tug that was in commission as a patrol vessel from 1917 to 1919.

L. A. Dempsey was built as the commercial tug Mascot in 1890 in Philadelphia, Pennsylvania. She later was renamed L. A. Dempsey. On 13 September 1917, the U.S. Navy acquired her from her owner, Dempsey & Son of Norfolk, Virginia, for use as a section patrol boat during World War I. She was commissioned as USS L. A. Dempsey (SP-1231).

Assigned to the 5th Naval District and based at Norfolk, L. A. Dempsey served as a section patrol boat for the rest of World War I and into 1919.

The Navy decommissioned L. A. Dempsey on 11 July 1919 and returned her to Dempsey & Son the same day.
