= USS La Moure County =

Two United States Navy ships have been named USS La Moure County, in honor of LaMoure County, North Dakota:

- USS La Moure County (LST-883), an LST-542-class tank landing ship (LST) was launched in 1944 as USS LST-883, renamed La Moure County in 1955, and struck in 1960.
- USS La Moure County (LST-1194), a Newport-class tank landing ship was launched in 1971, and struck in 2000.
