= USS Leslie =

Tugboat of the United States Navy

History

United States
- Acquired: early in 1861
- In service: 1861
- Out of service: 1865
- Fate: Returned to the Army 2 June 1865

General characteristics
- Displacement: 100 tons
- Propulsion: steam engine; screw-propelled

USS Leslie was a steamer acquired by the Union Navy during the American Civil War. She was used by the Navy as a tugboat.

== Service history ==
Leslie was a screw tug borrowed from the Union Army by the Navy early in 1861 for duty at the Washington Navy Yard. On 9 March 1862, Leslie alerted Union naval forces defending Washington, D.C. of the threat from Confederate ironclad CSS Virginia. However, while she steamed to the mouth of the Potomac River with word of Virginia’s brilliantly successful and ominous foray, plucky USS Monitor was fighting the dreaded Confederate ironclad to a standstill and neutralizing the threat to the Union capital. During 1862 and 1863, Leslie served as tender to the Potomac Flotilla. Thereafter, she served at the Washington Navy Yard until returned to the Army at Baltimore, Maryland on 2 June 1865.
