= USS Linta =

Patrol vessel of the United States Navy

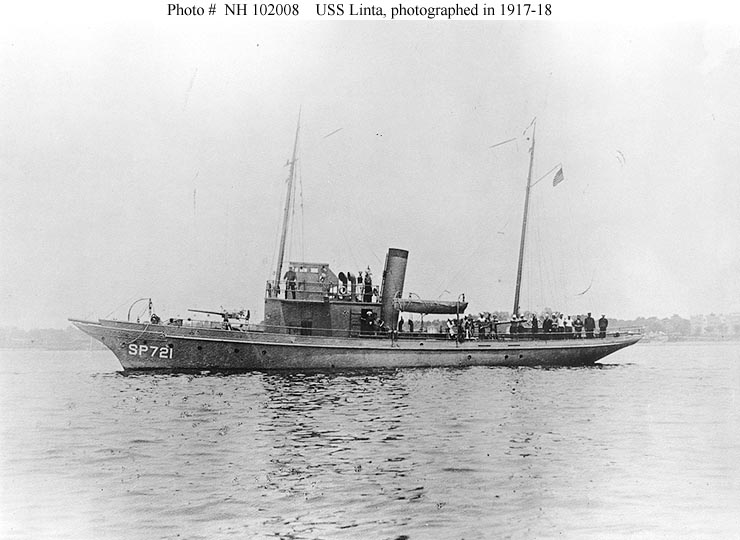
- USS Linta (SP-721) sometime between December 1917 and December 1918.

History

United States
- Name: USS Linta
- Namesake: Previous name retained
- Builder: Charles L. Seabury Company and Gas Engine & Power Company, Morris Heights, the Bronx, New York
- Completed: 1905
- Acquired: Chartered 27 June 1917; Delivered 3 July 1917
- Commissioned: 17 December 1917
- Decommissioned: 19 February 1919
- Fate: Returned to owner 19 February 1919
- Notes: Operated as private yacht Linta 1905-1917 and from 1919

General characteristics
- Type: Patrol vessel
- Tonnage: 53 Gross register tons
- Length: 108 ft (33 m)
- Beam: 17 ft 4 in (5.28 m)
- Draft: 5 ft 9 in (1.75 m) aft
- Propulsion: Steam engine
- Speed: 12 knots
- Complement: 26
- Armament: 3 × 6-pounder guns

USS Linta (SP-721) was a United States Navy patrol vessel in commission from 1917 to 1919.

Linta was built as a private steam yacht of the same name in 1905 by the Charles L. Seabury Company and the Gas Engine & Power Company at Morris Heights in the Bronx, New York. On 27 June 1917, the U.S. Navy chartered her from her owner, Walter Lüttgen of New York City, for use as a section patrol vessel during World War I. Enrolled in the Naval Coast Defense Reserve on 29 June 1917 and delivered to the Navy on 3 July 1917, she was commissioned as USS Linta (SP-721) on 17 December 1917 at the New York Navy Yard in Brooklyn, New York.

Assigned to the 3rd Naval District and based at New York City, Linta served on patrol and escort duties for the rest of World War I. She accompanied merchant ships joining convoys out of New York or leaving convoys arriving there, and she patrolled off southern Long Island near Fire Island Lightship. On several occasions, she escorted submarines from New York to Submarine Base New London at New London, Connecticut.

Linta was decommissioned on 19 February 1919 and returned to Lüttgen the same day.
