= USS Long Beach =

Three ships of the United States Navy have been named USS Long Beach, after the city of Long Beach, California:

- USS Long Beach (AK-9), launched in 1892 as SS Yarrowdale, was a German cargo ship seized in 1917, in use until 1921, and sold the following year.
- USS Long Beach (PF-34), launched in 1943, was a Tacoma-class frigate that saw use from 1943 to 1945, before being loaned to the Soviet Navy and then in 1962 to the Japan Maritime Self-Defense Force as Shii.
- USS Long Beach (CGN-9), launched in 1959, was the first nuclear-powered guided missile cruiser in the world, serving from 1961 to 1995, including service in the Vietnam War and Gulf War.
