= USS Letter B =

Patrol vessel of the United States Navy

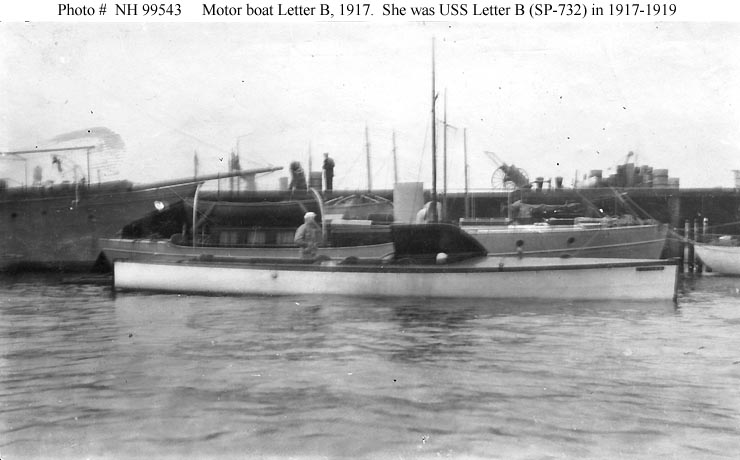
- Letter B as a private motorboat, probably at the time of her acquisition by the United States Navy in May 1917.

History

United States
- Name: USS Letter B
- Namesake: Previous name retained
- Builder: Electric Launch Company (ELCO), Bayonne, New Jersey
- Completed: 1912
- Acquired: 7 May 1917
- Commissioned: 20 October 1917
- Fate: Returned to owner 29 April 1919
- Notes: Operated as private motorboat Letter B 1912-1917 and from 1919

General characteristics
- Type: Patrol vessel
- Length: 40 ft (12 m)
- Beam: 6 ft (1.8 m)
- Draft: 2 ft (0.61 m)
- Propulsion: Gasoline engine, one shaft
- Speed: 30 knots
- Complement: 3
- Armament: None

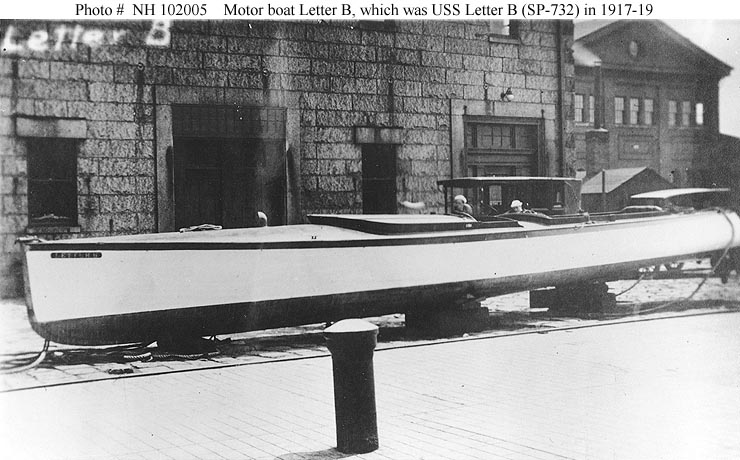
Letter B as a private motorboat, hauled out of the water sometime between 1912 and 1917.

USS Letter B (SP-732) was a United States Navy patrol vessel in commission from 1917 to 1919.

Letter B was built in 1912 as a private "runabout"-type motorboat of the same name by the Electric Launch Company (ELCO) at Bayonne, New Jersey. On 7 May 1917, the U.S. Navy acquired her under a free lease from her owner, C. Chester Eaton of Brockton, Massachusetts, for use as a section patrol vessel during World War I. Enrolled in the Naval Coast Defense Reserve on 10 May 1917, she was commissioned as USS Letter B (SP-732) on 20 October 1917 at Norfolk, Virginia.

Assigned to the 5th Naval District, Letter B served as a harbor and shore patrol boat at Norfolk and Hampton Roads, Virginia, for the rest of World War I . She also served as a duty and emergency boat for seaplanes at Naval Air Station Norfolk.

The Navy returned Letter B to Eaton on 29 April 1919.
