= Lady Doris (SP-3854) =

Patrol vessel of the United States Navy

History

United States
- Name: Lady Doris
- Namesake: Previous name retained
- Builder: Reliance Boat Company, New Orleans, Louisiana
- Completed: 1916
- Acquired: 10 June 1918
- Fate: Returned to owner 2 October 1918
- Notes: No active U.S. Navy service; Operated as civilian motorboat Lady Doris 1916-June 1918 and from October 1918

General characteristics
- Type: Patrol vessel

Lady Doris (SP-3854) was a proposed patrol vessel the United States Navy acquired in 1918 but never commissioned.

Lady Doris was built in 1916 as a private motorboat of the same name by the Reliance Boat Company at New Orleans, Louisiana. On 10 June 1918, the U.S. Navy chartered her from her owner, H. D. Newman of New Orleans, for use as a section patrol boat during World War I. She was assigned the section patrol number SP-3854.

Although assigned to the 8th Naval District, Lady Doris saw no active naval service. The Navy returned her to Newman on 2 October 1918.
