= USS Little Aie =

Patrol vessel of the United States Navy

History

United States
- Name: USS Little Aie
- Namesake: Previous name retained
- Builder: Smith and Williams Company, Salisbury, Maryland
- Completed: 1915
- Acquired: 5 April 1917
- Commissioned: 25 April 1917
- Decommissioned: 25 January 1919
- Fate: Returned to owner 25 January 1919
- Notes: Operated as private yacht Little Aie 1915-1917 and from 1919

General characteristics
- Type: Patrol vessel
- Tonnage: 17 tons
- Length: 57 ft 3 in (17.45 m)
- Beam: 10 ft 10 in (3.30 m)
- Draft: 3 ft 3 in (0.99 m)
- Speed: 13 knots
- Complement: 9
- Armament: 1 × 1-pounder gun; 1 × .30-caliber (7.62-millimeter) machine gun

USS Little Aie (SP-60) was an armed yacht that served in the United States Navy as a patrol vessel from 1917 to 1919.

Little Aie was built in 1915 by the Smith and Williams Company at Salisbury, Maryland, as a private motor yacht of the same name. The U.S. Navy acquired her on a free lease from her owner, John P. Wetherill Jr., of Philadelphia, Pennsylvania, on 5 April 1917 for World War I service. She was enrolled in the Naval Coast Defense Reserve on 17 April 1917 and commissioned as USS Little Aie (SP-60) on 25 April 1917 at Philadelphia.

Assigned to the 4th Naval District at Philadelphia, Little Aie patrolled the Delaware River and Delaware Bay from Camden, New Jersey, to Lewes, Delaware, and Cold Spring, New Jersey. She served as dispatch boat in Philadelphia harbor and guarded submarine nets there.

Departing Philadelphia on 28 July 1918, Little Aie voyaged along the United States East Coast to Key West, Florida, where she arrived on 30 August 1918 for section patrol duty with the 7th Naval District. Serving as a patrol boat, dispatch boat, and target towing craft, she operated in the Florida Keys and along the United States Gulf Coast to Tampa, Florida, and Boca Grande, Florida.

Departing Key West on 1 December 1918, Little Aie arrived at Philadelphia on 30 December 1918. She decommissioned there on 25 January 1919 and was returned to her owner the same day.
