= USS La Salle =

Two ships of the United States Navy have been named USS La Salle, after Rene Robert Chevalier de La Salle.

- USS La Salle (AP-102), originally named Hotspur, was a transport ship of World War II;
- USS La Salle (AGF-3), was a command ship commissioned in 1964 and decommissioned in 2005.

== Other ==
The United States steam merchant ship D/S La Salle built in 1920 was sunk by German submarine U-159 on 7 November 1942 during World War II near the Cape of Good Hope, Africa. None of the 60 crew and personnel survived.
