= USS Lannai =

Patrol vessel of the United States Navy

History

United States
- Name: USS Lannai
- Notes: No records regarding Lannai's construction, acquisition, naval service, or fate have been found

General characteristics
- Type: Patrol vessel
- Notes: Lannai was a motorboat, but no records regarding her characteristics and performance have been found

USS Lannai (SP-242) was a motorboat which the United States Navy at least considered for service—and may have placed in service—during World War I as a patrol vessel.

Lannai received section patrol number 242, indicating that she was a privately owned motorboat which the U.S. Navy sometime between 1916 and 1918 at least considered for World War I service as a patrol vessel. No records have been found describing Lannai's construction, acquisition, naval service (if any), or physical characteristics and performance; her records may have been lost or destroyed. She may have seen active naval service, although some boats which received section patrol numbers were never commissioned or, in some cases, never even acquired by the Navy, so it also is possible that the lack of records reflects a lack of naval service for Lannai.
