= USS Lassen =

USS Lassen may refer to the following ships of the United States Navy:

- USS Lassen (AE-3) was acquired by the US Navy 15 November 1940 and decommissioned 15 January 1947
- USS Lassen (DDG-82) is an Arleigh Burke-class destroyer launched 16 October 1999 and currently in active service
