= USS Lorikeet =

USS Lorikeet may refer to the following ships of the United States Navy:

- USS Lorikeet (AMc-49), was a coastal minesweeper commissioned 8 August 1941 and decommissioned 14 December 1945
- USS Lorikeet (YMS-271), was launched 17 October 1942 as YMS-271, renamed and reclassified as Lorikeet (AMS‑49) 1 September 1947 and struck 1 October 1968
