= USS Lapwing =

USS Lapwing may refer to the following ships of the United States Navy:

- USS Lapwing (AM-1) was laid down 25 October 1917 by Todd Shipyard Co., New York
- USS Lapwing (AMS-48) was laid down as YMS-268 on 1 December 1942 by Kruse & Banks Shipbuilding Co., North Bend, Oregon
