= USS Leyden (IX-167) =

History

United States
- Name: USS Leyden
- Builder: Harlan and Hollingsworth, Wilmington, Delaware
- Launched: 1911
- Acquired: 22 May 1944
- Commissioned: 22 May 1944
- Decommissioned: 23 July 1945
- Fate: Sold into commercial service, 7 November 1946

General characteristics
- Displacement: 2,500 long tons (2,540 t)
- Length: 291 ft 2 in (88.75 m)
- Beam: 51 ft (16 m)
- Draft: 18 ft (5.5 m)
- Speed: 15 knots (28 km/h; 17 mph)

USS Leyden (IX-167), was an auxiliary transport ship of the United States Navy during World War II. She was built as the Northland by Harlan & Hollingsworth Corp., Wilmington, Delaware, in 1911.

== Service history ==
During the first part of World War II, she operated as a transport with the British Royal Navy. She was assigned the name Leyden (IX-167) on 18 May 1944, acquired by the US Navy and commissioned on 22 May 1944.

From her commissioning until July 1945, Leyden operated as a naval auxiliary in British staging areas and French ports during the final European campaigns of World War II.

Leyden was decommissioned at Falmouth, England, on 23 July 1945 for return to the War Shipping Administration (WSA), and was sold to the Fu Chung International Corp., on 7 November 1946. She was renamed Hung Chong.
