= USS Leader (PYc-42) =

History

United States
- Ordered: as ex-Curlew
- Laid down: 1927
- Launched: 1927
- Acquired: 24 October 1942
- Commissioned: 24 October 1942
- Decommissioned: 11 May 1945
- Stricken: date unknown
- Home port: San Diego, California
- Fate: Sold, 1949

General characteristics
- Displacement: 230 tons
- Length: 117 ft (36 m)
- Beam: 19 ft 6 in (5.94 m)
- Speed: 13 knots
- Complement: 25
- Armament: two 20 mm machine guns., two depth charge tracks, two rocket launchers

USS Leader (PYc-42) was a Leader-class patrol boat acquired by the U.S. Navy for the task of patrolling coastal areas during World War II when there was the danger of enemy submarine activity.

The first ship to be named Leader by the Navy, PYc-42, ex-Curlew, was built by White & Co. Ltd., Southampton, England, in 1927; acquired by the Navy from F. S. Molson, Montreal, Canada, 24 October 1942; and commissioned the same day.

== World War II service ==
Following three months in New York City, Leader, a coastal patrol yacht, sailed 18 February 1943 for her permanent assignment. She trained off Florida and Cuba before arriving San Diego, California, 8 April.

For the next two years the patrol yacht operated along the U.S. West Coast and with the San Diego Sound School, training Navy and Coast Guard personnel in antisubmarine warfare techniques.

== Post-war deactivation ==
Leader continued this service until she decommissioned 11 May 1945. She was returned to War Shipping Administration (WSA) 4 September 1946, sold in 1949 to Kenneth E. Wilson of Los Angeles, California, and renamed Chito.
