= USS Lancaster (ID-2953) =

Cargo ship of the United States Navy

History

United States
- Name: Lancaster
- Namesake: Lancaster, Pennsylvania
- Builder: Sun Shipbuilding Co., Chester, Pennsylvania
- Laid down: date unknown
- Launched: 5 May 1918
- Completed: in 1918
- Acquired: by the U.S. Navy, 19 June 1918
- Commissioned: 19 June 1918 as Lancaster (ID-2953) at Philadelphia, Pennsylvania
- Decommissioned: 4 October 1919
- Stricken: date unknown
- Fate: Returned to the United States Shipping Board; fate unknown

General characteristics
- Type: commercial cargo ship
- Displacement: 14,620 tons
- Length: 450 ft (140 m)
- Beam: 57 ft 6 in (17.53 m)
- Draft: 28 ft 2 in (8.59 m)
- Speed: 10.5 knots
- Complement: 92 personnel
- Armament: one 5-inch gun and one 6-pounder gun

USS Lancaster (ID-2953) was a commercial cargo ship acquired by the U.S. Navy during World War I. She served the war effort by carrying cargo across the Atlantic Ocean, and, at war’s end, bringing home the troops.

== Built at Chester, Pennsylvania ==
The second ship to be so named by the Navy, Lancaster, a cargo ship, was launched 5 May 1918 by Sun Shipbuilding Co., Chester, Pennsylvania; acquired by the Navy 19 June 1918; and commissioned at Philadelphia, Pennsylvania, the same day.

== World War I service ==
Assigned to the Naval transportation service (NOTS), Lancaster departed New York City 13 July with cargo for South American ports. Arriving Buenos Aires, Argentina, 10 days later, she discharged her cargo and proceeded to Marseille, France, where she arrived 28 October. After the Armistice was signed 11 November, Lancaster returned to New York City the following month to join the Cruiser Transport Force 17 December.

== Troopship assignment ==
Lancaster together with other units of the Cruiser Transport Force was assigned the task of returning World War I veterans from Europe to the United States. The force returned over 85 percent of the veterans during the period from November 1918 to July 1919.

== Post-war dispositioning ==
Completing her service, Lancaster decommissioned 4 October 1919 and was returned to the United States Shipping Board (USSB) the same day.
