= USS League Island (YFB-20) =

History

United States
- Name: USS League Island
- Namesake: League Island, the site of the Navy Yard, Philadelphia, Pennsylvania, at the junction of the Schuylkill River and the Delaware River
- Owner: Reynolds Palmer and Raymond H. Abell, Gales Ferry, Connecticut
- Builder: Neafie & Levy S. and E. B. Co., Philadelphia, Pennsylvania
- Laid down: date unknown
- Completed: April 1907
- Acquired: by the Navy 24 February 1941
- In service: 7 March 1941
- Out of service: 6 June 1946
- Reclassified: YFB-20 27 February 1941
- Stricken: date unknown
- Homeport: League Island, Philadelphia
- Fate: Returned to War Shipping Administration (WSA) 9 January 1947

General characteristics
- Type: commercial ferryboat
- Displacement: 425 tons
- Length: 136 ft 6 in (41.61 m)
- Beam: 29 ft (8.8 m)
- Draft: 8 ft 9 in (2.67 m)
- Propulsion: not known
- Crew: 20 crew members
- Armament: not known

USS League Island (YFB-20) was a 166-foot-long commercial craft acquired by the U.S. Navy during World War II. It was primarily used as a ferryboat on the Delaware River, transporting military personnel between the Philadelphia Navy Yard, located on League Island, and military activities and contractors on the New Jersey side of the river.

== Built in Philadelphia ==
Block Island (ex-Hook Mountain, ex-Machigonne) was built in April 1907 by Neafie & Levy S. and E. B. Co., Philadelphia, Pennsylvania; purchased by the Navy 24 February 1941 from H. Reynolds Palmer and Raymond H. Abell, Gales Ferry, Connecticut; classified YFB-20 27 February 1941; renamed League Island and placed in service 7 March 1941.

== World War II service ==
League Island (YFB-20) was assigned to the 4th Naval District 17 March 1941 for ferrying service between the Philadelphia Naval Yard, and National Park, New Jersey, which she carried out efficiently throughout the war.

== Post-war decommissioning ==
League Island was placed out of service 6 June 1946 and returned to the War Shipping Administration (WSA) 9 January 1947.
