= USS Lagoda =

Patrol vessel of the United States Navy

History

United States
- Name: USS Lagoda
- Namesake: Previous name retained
- Builder: New York Yacht, Launch & Engine Company, Morris Heights, the Bronx, New York
- Completed: 1906
- Acquired: 20 September 1918
- Commissioned: 17 November 1918
- Decommissioned: 15 August 1919
- Fate: Sold 30 October 1919; Delivered to new owner 20 November 1919
- Notes: Operated as private motorboat Mosquetaire, Jessica, Lady Arden, Scotian, and Lagoda 1906-1918

General characteristics
- Type: Patrol vessel
- Tonnage: 49 gross register tons
- Length: 85 ft (26 m)
- Beam: 14 ft (4.3 m)
- Draft: 4 ft 6 in (1.37 m)
- Speed: 10 knots (19 km/h; 12 mph)
- Complement: 10

USS Lagoda (SP-3250) was a United States Navy patrol vessel in commission from 1918 to 1919.

Lagoda was built as the private motorboat Mosquetaire in 1906 by the New York Yacht, Launch & Engine Company at Morris Heights in the Bronx, New York. She later was renamed successively Jessica, Lady Arden, Scotian, and Lagoda.

On 20 September 1918, the U.S. Navy acquired Lagoda from her owner, N. W. Tilton of New York City, for use as a section patrol boat during World War I. She was commissioned as USS Lagoda (SP-3250) on 17 November 1918 - six days after the end of the war.

Assigned to the 3rd Naval District and based at the Staten Island Quarantine Station on Staten Island, New York, Lagoda was used by the District Commissioner, Naval Overseas Transportation Service, in New York Harbor.

Lagoda was decommissioned on 15 August 1919 and sold to Robert J. Bourke of Washington, D.C., on 30 October 1919. Bourke took delivery of her from the Navy on 20 November 1919.
