= USS Long Island (SP-572) =

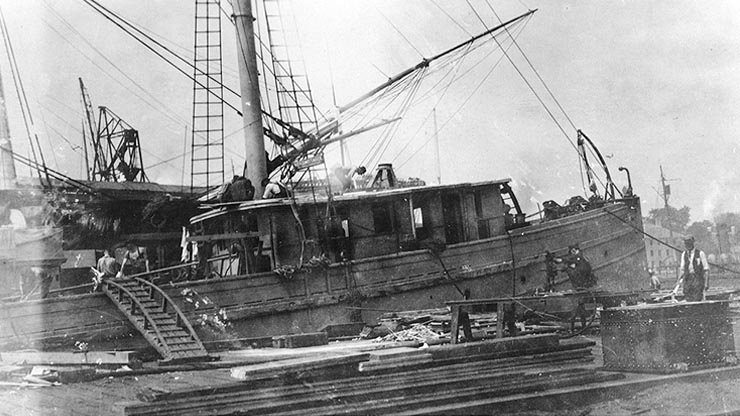
- Long Island being altered for Navy service, circa May 1917

History

United States
- Builder: Cobb & Butler
- Launched: 1912
- Acquired: 18 April 1917
- Commissioned: 8 May 1917
- Decommissioned: 13 September 1919
- Fate: Sold 1 December 1919

General characteristics
- Type: steam trawler
- Displacement: 167 tons
- Length: 164 ft 4 in (50.09 m)
- Beam: 24 ft 1 in (7.34 m)
- Draft: 6 ft 9 in (2.06 m)
- Speed: 11.5 kn (21.3 km/h; 13.2 mph)
- Complement: 25
- Armament: 1 × 3 pounder cannon

Long Island was a 167-ton steam trawler built as a civilian ship until purchased by the United States Navy and commissioned as USS Long Island (SP-572).

Long Island was built in 1912 by Cobb & Butler in Rockland, Maine and purchased by the US Navy 18 April 1917 from her owner, George B. Morrill. She was taken over 1 May 1917 and enrolled in the Naval Coast Defense Reserve 2 May 1917; and commissioned 8 May 1917 at Boston.

Assigned to the 1st Naval District, Long Island throughout the war served out of Boston as harbor patrol ship, minesweeper, and icebreaker. From 30 March until 18 April 1918 she escorted a submarine chaser between Boston and Bermuda. She then sailed to New London, Conn., and Newport, R.I., before returning to Boston 30 April.

Long Island departed Boston 30 January 1919 for Charleston, S.C., where she arrived 5 February. Assigned to the 6th Naval District, she served as a temporary lightship off Charleston until 25 May. Detached from the 6th Naval District 24 June, during the next 2 months she operated along the Atlantic coast from Hampton Roads to Boston. She decommissioned 13 September 1919 and was sold on 1 December 1919 to the Douglas Company in Reedville, Va.
