= USS Lillian II =

Patrol vessel of the United States Navy

History

United States
- Name: USS Lillian II
- Namesake: Previous name retained
- Builder: Willard Downes, Bayshore, New York
- Completed: 1909
- Acquired: Chartered 6 June 1917; Enrolled in Coast Defense Reserve 8 June 1917; Taken over 16 June 1917
- Commissioned: 20 July 1917
- Decommissioned: 19 December 1917
- Fate: Returned to owner 20 December 1917
- Notes: Operated as private motorboat Lillian II 1911-1917 and from December 1917

General characteristics
- Type: Patrol vessel
- Tonnage: 13 tons
- Length: 50 ft (15 m)
- Beam: 10 ft (3.0 m)
- Draft: 3 ft (0.91 m)
- Speed: 10 knots
- Complement: 4
- Armament: 1 × .30-caliber (7.62-millimeter) machine gun

USS Lillian II (SP-38) was an armed motorboat that served in the United States Navy as a patrol vessel in 1917.

Lillian II was built in 1909 by Willard Downes at Bayshore, New York, as a private motorboat of the same name. The U.S. Navy acquired Lillian II from her owner, S. F. Rothschild of Bayshore, under a bare-boat charter on 6 June 1917 for World War I service. She was enrolled in the Coast Defense Reserve on 8 June 1917, delivered to the Navy on 16 June 1917, and commissioned as USS Lillian II (SP-38) on 20 July 1917.

Assigned to the 3rd Naval District at New York City, Lillian II operated as a shore patrol boat in Great South Bay on the southern coast of Long Island, New York.

The Navy decommissioned Lillian II on 19 December 1917 and returned her to her owner on 20 December 1917.
