= USS Lydia (SP-62) =

Patrol vessel of the United States Navy

History

United States
- Name: USS Lydia
- Namesake: Previous name retained
- Builder: George Lawley and Sons, Neponset, Massachusetts
- Completed: 1916
- Acquired: Leased 28 March 1917; Taken over 4 April 1917
- Commissioned: 18 August 1917
- Decommissioned: 10 April 1919
- Fate: Returned to owner 17 April 1919

General characteristics
- Type: Patrol vessel
- Tonnage: 24 tons
- Length: 40 ft (12 m)
- Beam: 9 ft (2.7 m)
- Draft: 3 ft (0.91 m)
- Speed: 22 knots
- Complement: 8
- Armament: 1 × .30-caliber (7.62-millimeter) machine gun

- Note: This ship should not be confused with the second USS Lydia (ID-3524), which was in commission during an overlapping period.

The first USS Lydia (SP-62) was an armed motorboat that served in the United States Navy as a patrol vessel from 1917 to 1919.

Lydia was built as a private motorboat of the same name in 1916 by George Lawley and Sons at Neponset, Massachusetts. The U.S. Navy acquired her for World War I service as a patrol vessel on a free lease from her owner, Joseph Shattuck of New York City, on 28 March 1917 and took delivery of her on 4 April 1917. The Navy commissioned her as USS Lydia (SP-62) at Boston, Massachusetts, on 18 August 1917.

Assigned to the 1st Naval District at Boston, Lydia served as a dispatch boat and harbor patrol boat in the port of Boston until 24 November 1917, when she departed for Philadelphia, Pennsylvania. She arrived there on 8 December 1917.

On 8 March 1918, Lydia departed Philadelphia for Norfolk, Virginia, where she arrived on 16 March 1918 and reported for duty with the 5th Naval District. During the remainder of World War I she served as a messenger and dispatch boat at Norfolk.

After the Armistice with Germany that ended the war on 11 November 1918, Lydia departed Norfolk on 13 March 1919 for Boston, where she arrived on 3 April 1919. She decommissioned on 10 April 1919 at Boston and was returned to Mrs. Joseph Shattuck on 17 April 1919.
