= USS Longspur (AMCU-28) =

Minesweeper of the United States Navy

History

United States
- Name: USS Longspur
- Builder: New Jersey Shipbuilding Company, Barber, New Jersey
- Laid down: 22 September 1944
- Launched: 20 October 1944
- Commissioned: 27 October 1944, as USS LCI(L)-884
- Decommissioned: 24 March 1947
- Recommissioned: June 1952, as USS Longspur (AMCU-28)
- Decommissioned: 1 January 1954
- Reclassified: AMCU-28, 7 March 1952; MHC-28, 7 February 1953
- Honors and awards: 1 battle star (World War II)
- Fate: Sold for scrap, 18 May 1960

General characteristics
- Class & type: LCI(L)-351-class large landing craft
- Displacement: 216 long tons (219 t)
- Length: 158 ft 6 in (48.31 m)
- Beam: 23 ft 3 in (7.09 m)
- Draft: 3 ft 1.5 in (0.953 m)
- Propulsion: 8 × GM diesel engines (4 per shaft), 1,600 bhp (1,193 kW); 2 × variable pitch propellers
- Speed: 14 knots (26 km/h; 16 mph)
- Complement: 2 officers, 21 enlisted
- Armament: 4 × single 20 mm AA guns, one forward, one amidships, two aft, later added two .50 cal (12.7 mm) machine guns

USS Longspur (AMCU-28) was a LCI(L)-351-class large landing craft of the United States Navy, later converted to a AMCU-7-class Coastal Minesweeper (Underwater Locator).

The ship was laid down on 22 September 1944 by the New Jersey Shipbuilding Company of Barber, New Jersey, launched on 20 October 1944, and commissioned as USS LCI(L)-884 on 27 October 1944.

== Service history ==
=== 1944–1949 ===
After shakedown LCI(L)-884 departed Norfolk, Virginia on 25 November, steamed through the Panama Canal, and arrived at San Diego, California on 20 December. Following additional training off the west coast, the landing craft sailed on 6 March 1945 for the Marianas, arriving at Guam on 8 April. Two weeks later she was en route to Okinawa, where U.S. Forces were already engaged in the most extensive campaign of the Pacific War.

Upon her arrival on 28 April LCI(L)-884 was assigned mail delivery and smoke station duty for large ships operating off Okinawa. She remained in the vicinity for the rest of the war, playing a part for the fleet in aiding it against the Empire of Japan.

After the war she operated as a mine destruction vessel out of Nagasaki and Sasebo, remaining in Japan until December 1945. Early in 1946, LCI(L)-884 returned to the United States and was decommissioned on 24 March 1947, joining the Atlantic Reserve Fleet at Green Cove Springs, Florida. She was reclassified as Landing Ship, Infantry (Large) LSI(L)-884 on 28 February 1949.

=== 1952–1960 ===
LSI(L)-884 was named and redesignated as Coastal minesweeper (Underwater Locator) USS Longspur (AMCU-28) on 7 March 1952, and recommissioned in June 1952. Conversion to AMCU-28 began on 15 November 1953 at the Charleston Naval Shipyard, Charleston, South Carolina, and was completed on 15 May 1954. Longspur was then assigned to the 6th Naval District for harbor defense. Reclassified as Coastal Minehunter MHC-28 on 7 February 1953, she continued operations out of Charleston, South Carolina, until 1 January 1954.

Decommissioned on the first day of the year, she joined the Atlantic Reserve Fleet at Charleston, South Carolina. Struck from the Navy List on 1 January 1960, Longspur was sold to the Mills Marine Co., on 18 May 1960, and was towed away for scrap on 22 June 1960.

LCI(L)-884 received one battle star for World War II service.
