= USS Longspur (AMc-10) =

Minesweeper of the United States Navy

History

United States
- Name: USS Longspur
- Builder: Martinac Shipbuilding Co., Tacoma, Washington
- Launched: 1935, as New Ambassador
- Acquired: 30 October 1940
- Commissioned: 11 April 1941
- Decommissioned: 12 August 1944
- Stricken: 16 September 1944
- Fate: Transferred to the War Shipping Administration for return to owner, 12 July 1945

General characteristics
- Type: Coastal minesweeper
- Displacement: 200 long tons (203 t)
- Length: 81 ft 2 in (24.74 m)
- Beam: 21 ft (6.4 m)
- Draft: 4 ft 8 in (1.42 m)
- Propulsion: Diesel engine, one shaft
- Speed: 10 knots (19 km/h; 12 mph)
- Armament: 2 × .30 cal (7.62 mm) machine guns

USS Longspur (AMc-10) was a coastal minesweeper of the United States Navy. Built by the Martinac Shipbuilding Co., Tacoma, Washington, as New Ambassador in 1935, the ship was acquired by the U.S. Navy on 30 October 1940; converted by South Coast Shipyard, Newport Beach, California; and placed in service on 11 April 1941.

== Service history ==
Arriving in the Panama Canal Zone on 22 May, Longspur operated in the 15th Naval District for the next three years. She performed coastal minesweeping, patrolled the entrance to the Panama Canal, and escorted ships approaching the canal.

Returning to San Diego, California, on 5 July 1944 Longspur was placed out of service on 12 August 1944, struck from the Naval Vessel Register on 16 September 1944, and transferred to the War Shipping Administration for return to her owner on 12 July 1945. Fate unknown.
