= USS Lee (1776) =

History

United States
- Name: USS Lee
- Namesake: Richard Henry Lee
- In service: 1776
- Out of service: 1777
- Fate: ran aground and bilged, 1777

General characteristics
- Type: cutter galley
- Displacement: 48 tons
- Length: 43 ft 9 in (13.34 m)
- Beam: 16 ft 3 in (4.95 m)
- Draft: 4 ft 8 in (1.42 m)
- Propulsion: oars
- Complement: 86 officers and enlisted
- Armament: 1 × 12-pounder gun; 1 × 9-pounder gun; 4 × 4-pounder guns

USS Lee was a 6-gun row galley of the Continental Navy during the American Revolutionary War. She participated in the Battle of Valcour Island during which she was grounded and lost. However, her participation in the battle helped delay the British advance on New York City by a year.

The ship was named for Founding Father Richard Henry Lee, a Continental Congressman and the author of the 1776 Lee Resolution.

== Service history ==
The second ship to be so named by the Navy, Lee was a galley cutter built under direction of General Benedict Arnold at Skenesboro, New York, in 1776 for service on Lake Champlain. It was constructed of timber captured in October 1775 at St. Jean’s, the British shipyard on the lake. Lee, commanded by a Captain Davis, joined Arnold’s squadron 6 September 1776; the galley cutter operated on Lake Champlain for shortly over a month, ready to defend the inland water path which connected Canada and New York. When the British moved south, the American flotilla met them in the Battle of Valcour Island 11 October 1776. Lee ran aground and bilged, during the action in which the small American squadron was all but wiped out. However, while suffering a serious tactical defeat, General Arnold’s ships won a great strategic victory by delaying for a year the British advance on New York City, a year in which the patriots prepared for the new British offensive which ended with the surrender of a British army at the Battle of Saratoga.
