= USS Levi Woodbury =

USS Levi Woodbury may refer to:

- USRC Levi Woodbury (1837), a Revenue Cutter launched on 27 March 1837 and sold on 1 June 1847. She was often referred to as Woodbury in US Navy records.
- USRC Levi Woodbury, a steam-powered Revenue Cutter built in 1863 and 1864 and launched as Mahoning. She was renamed Levi Woodbury on 5 June 1873, and sold on 10 August 1915. Again, she was often referred to as Woodbury in US Navy records.

== See also ==
- Levi Woodbury, a schooner that disappeared in 1849 resulting in the loss of 10 lives. See List of disasters in Maine by death toll and List of shipwrecks in October 1849
