= USS Kiowa =

USS Kiowa has been the name of more than one United States Navy ship, and may refer to:

- USS Kiowa (SP-711), later USS SP-711, a patrol vessel in commission from 1917 to 1918
- USS Kiowa (ID-1842), a cargo ship in commission from 1918 to 1919
- USS Kiowa (AT-72), later ATF-72, a tug commissioned in 1943 and transferred to the Dominican Republic in 1972

== See also ==
- Kiowa (disambiguation)
- SS Kiowa
