= Lynx (ship) =

Several vessels have been named Lynx for the lynx:

- Lynx (1776 ship) was launched at Whitby in 1776. From 1777 to 1798 she traded with the Baltic. Between 1798 and 1811 Lynx engaged in whaling in Davis Strait. She then changed to trading with New Brunswick; in 1812 a French privateer captured her.
- Lynx was a Chesapeake-built six-gun schooner that the British Royal Navy captured and took into service in 1813 as HMS Mosquidobit (1813) (sometimes Musquedobet or Musquidobit). She was sold into commercial service in 1820 and nothing is known of her subsequent fate.
- Lynx (tall ship) is a square topsail schooner launched in 2001 and based in Nantucket, Massachusetts. She is an interpretation of the 1812 American letter of marque vessel of the same name (see above).

== See also ==
- HMS Lynx – one of ten vessels or shore establishments of the British Royal Navy
- USS Lynx – one of two vessel names of the US Navy
- USS Lynx II (SP-730) – a United States Navy patrol vessel in commission from 1917 to 1919
- French corvette Lynx (1804) – The British captured her in 1807 and named her HMS Heureux. She was broken up in 1814.
- French destroyer Lynx – scuttled in 1942 to avoid capture by the Germans
