= SS Kiowa =

SS Kiowa is the name of the following ships, named for the Kiowa tribe:

- SS Kiowa (1903), sank in 1903
- SS Kiowa (1917), briefly commissioned as USS Kiowa (ID-1842)
- SS Kiowa (1920), sank in Lake Superior in 1929

== See also ==
- Kiowa (disambiguation)
- USS Kiowa
