= SS City of Philadelphia =

City of Philadelphia may refer to the following ships and other vessels:

- City of Philadelphia, 1854, British single screw passenger steam ship wrecked on her maiden voyage
- City of Philadelphia, 1919 EFC Design 1074 ship, built as Lake Elsmere, renamed City of Philadelphia 1923, commercial and U.S. Army service to 1946
