= USS Lynx =

USS Lynx may refer to:

- USS Lynx (1814), a schooner commissioned in 1815 that disappeared at sea in 1820
- USS Lynx (SP-2), a patrol boat in commission from 1917 to 1919
- USS Lynx (AK-100), a cargo ship in commission from 1943 to 1945

== See also ==
- USS Lynx II (SP-730), later renamed USS SP-730, a patrol boat in commission from 1917 to 1919
