= Agwilines Inc =

U.S. shipping company

AGWI Lines
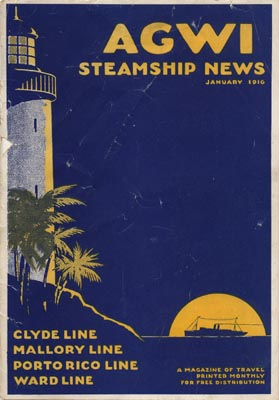
- Type: Shareholder Company
- Industry: Shipping, transportation
- Founded: 1908 in New York, United States
- Defunct: 1954
- Successor: Ward-García Line
- Area served: Worldwide
- Key people: H. H. Raymond, C. H. Mallory, Benjamin Graham and Jerome Newman

Agwilines Inc was a passenger and cargo shipping company of New York City. Agwilines is short for Atlantic, Gulf & West Indies Steamship Inc. AGWI Lines group operated four main lines in the 1910s, 1920s and 1930s:

- Ward Line
- Clyde line
- Mallory Line
- Porto Rico Line
- Later the Clyde-Mallory Lines

Agwilines Inc had offices in: New York, Philadelphia, Boston, Chicago, and Washington and was founded in 1908. In 1949, Graham-Newman Corporation (1926–1956), an investment corporation, purchased 70,000 shares of Agwilines Inc to become the controlling interest. Graham-Newman Corporation was founded by Benjamin Graham and Jerome Newm in 1926.

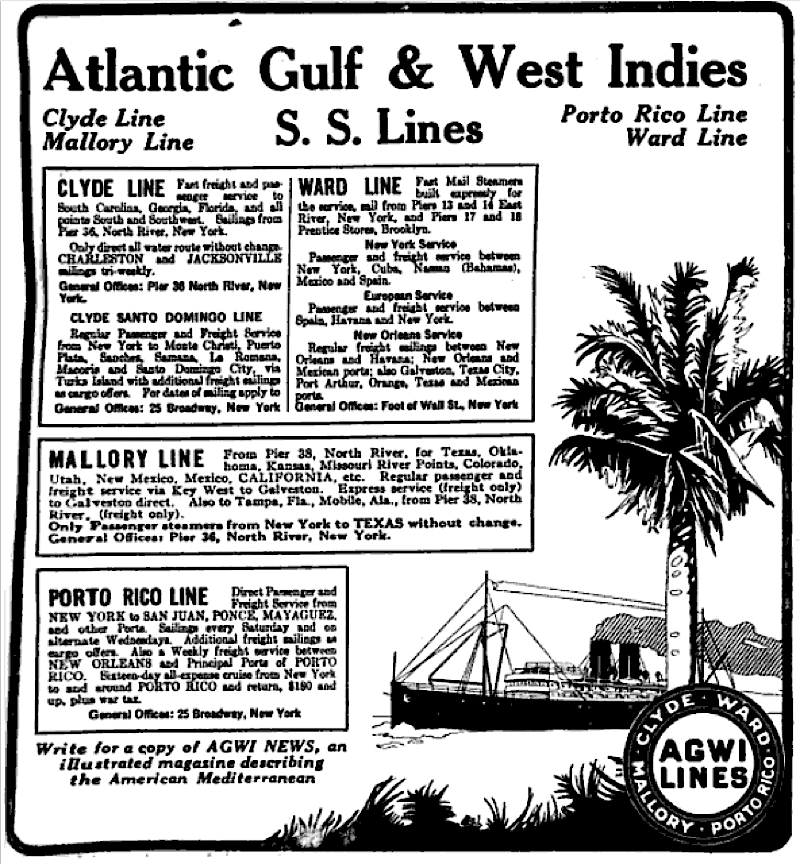
Atlantic, Gulf & West Indies Steamship Lines (AGWI) advertisement 1921 showing four component lines.

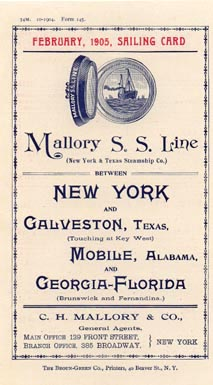
Mallory Line 1905

== Mallory Line ==
Mallory Line, also called New York & Texas Steamship Company of New York City was founded in 1866 and closed in 1932. Mallory Line was an early family-owned passenger line, started by Charles Henry Mallory (1818–1890), in the coastwise trade. Mallory established C.H. Mallory & Company with his partner Elihu Spicer (1825–1993). Mallory Line served New York, Galveston, Texas, New Orleans, Havana, and Mobile. In 1907 Mallory Line was sold to Charles W. Morse who with the Ward Line started the Consolidated Steamship Lines. In 1908 Consolidated Steamship went bankrupt and was sold to the Atlantic, Gulf and West Indies (AGWI) SS Company. AGWI continues the Mallory Line until 1932. The Metropolitan Steamship Company and Eastern Steamship Company that were part of Consolidated Steamship Company were not sold to Agwilines Inc. In 1934 Mallory Line merged with Clyde Line to be the Clyde-Mallory Line. In 1949 the Clyde-Mallory Line was sold to the Bull Line, the line was ended by Bull Line. C. H. Mallory served one term in the Connecticut Senate in 1862. C. H. Mallory father was Patriarch Charles Mallory (1796–1882), he had a fishing fleet in Mystic, Connecticut. The Mallory family had a shipyard in Mystic, that built ships for the Union Navy during the Civil War. Henry H. Raymond was president and general manager of the Clyde Steamship and Mallory Steamship Companies from 1908 to 1923. Clyde-Mallory Lines main ports were: Jacksonville, New York, Miami, Boston, Wilmington, Charleston, Key West, Galveston, Tampa, New Orleans and Mobile.

== Clyde Line ==
Clyde line ran from 1844 to 1907 under the Clyde Steamship Company. Thomas Clyde started the company in New York in 1872. The line ran between the US northeast and southeast. Later added were routes to the Dominican Republic and other West Indies. In 1908 the Clyde line ran under the Atlantic, Gulf and West Indies (AGWI) SS Company. In 1932 Mallory Line merged with Clyde Line. Thomas Clyde (1812–1885) was the founder and owner of the Clyde Line, Clyde Steamship Company. Main ports were New York City, Florida, Florida Keys, Boston, Providence, Cuba, and New Orleans. In 1861 Clyde's son, William P. Clyde took ownership till the 1906 sale. Clyde line ended in 1932, in the merger with Clyde-Mallory Line that ran from 1932 to 1949. Clyde Santo Domingo Line was a subsidiary of Clyde Line with service from New York City to West Indies.

== Porto Rico Line ==
Porto Rico Line of the New York and Porto Rico Steamship Company was founded in 1895 in a partnership with Archibald H. Bull and Juan Ceballos. Bull later founded the A. H. Bull and Company. The Porto Rico Line ran from New York to Red Hook's Atlantic Basin's Pier 35 to Puerto Rico. The Porto Rico Line was a cargo and tourists line, also Puerto Ricans migrated to New York's Red Hook, Brooklyn.

== Ward Line ==
Ward Line was started by the New York and Cuba Mail Steamship Company founded in 1877. Ward Line's first route was service to and from New York, Nassau and Havana. Ward purchased the Alexandre Line in 1888 adding service to the east coast of Mexico. In 1907 Charles W. Morse purchased the Ward Line. In 1908 Morse company went bankrupt and the Ward Line combined with several other Morse companies to form the Atlantic, Gulf and West Indies Line, Agwiline, each division ran under independent management. In 1908 was owned by Agwilines Inc, in 1954 became Ward-García Line.

== Consolidated Steamship Company ==
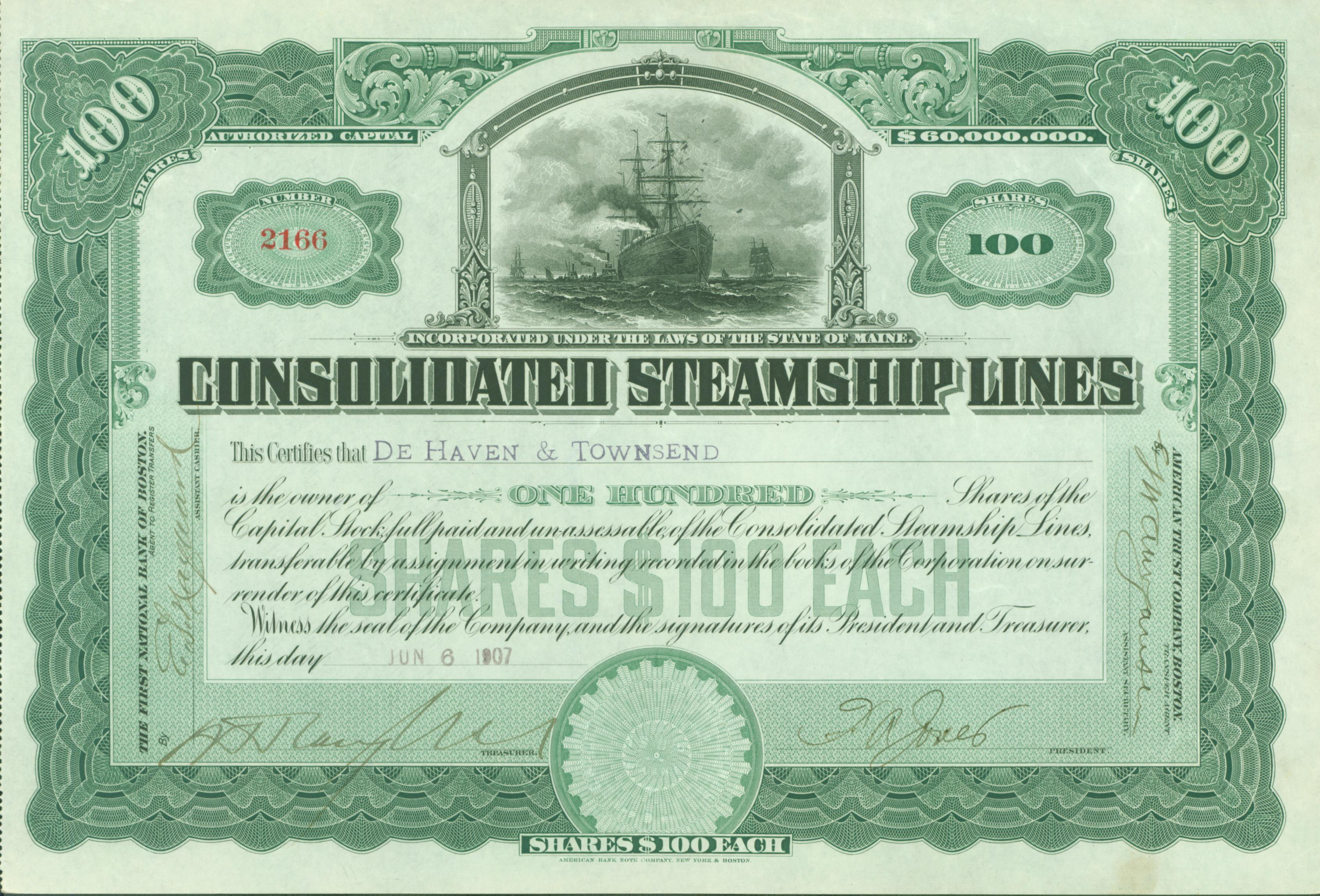
Share of the Consolidated Steamship Lines, issued 6 June 1907

Consolidated Steamship was founded by Charles W. Morse. On January 1, 1907 Charles W. Morse joined the Mallory Line, Porto Rico Line, the Ward Line, the Metropolitan Steamship Company and Eastern Steamship Company to form the Consolidated Steamship Lines. The financial crisis panic of 1907 put Consolidated Steamship Company into bankruptcy in 1908. Out of the bankruptcy the Consolidated Steamship Company was sold to the Atlantic, Gulf and West Indies SS Company (AGWI Inc.). The Metropolitan Steamship Company and Eastern Steamship Company that were part of Consolidated Steamship Company were not sold to Agwilines Inc.

== World War II ==
During World War II Agwilines Inc. was active with charter shipping with the Maritime Commission and War Shipping Administration. During wartime, the Agwilines Inc operated Victory ships and Liberty ships. The ship was run by its crew and the US Navy supplied United States Navy Armed Guards to man the deck guns and radio. The most common armament mounted on these merchant ships were the MK II 20mm Oerlikon autocannon and the 3"/50, 4"/50, and 5"/38 deck guns.

== Atlantic, Gulf & West Indies Steamship Inc ships ==
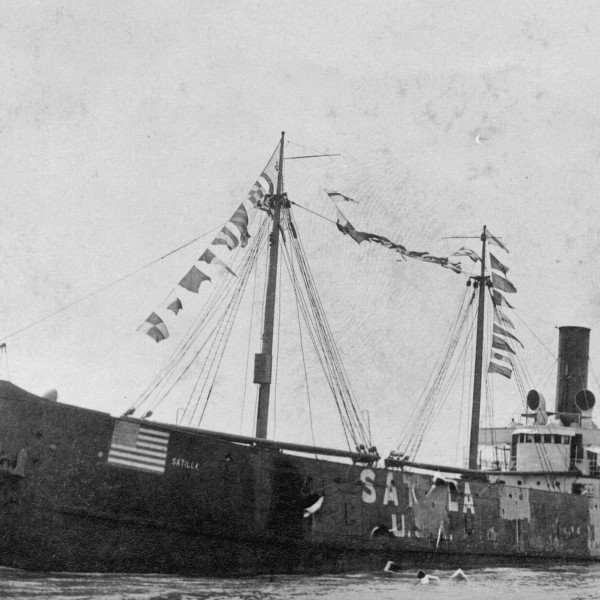
Agwilines's Satilla at Houston, Texas, in 1915

Atlantic, Gulf & West Indies Steamship Inc ships:

- Satilla (1912), sunk in 1917 by a U-boat as Hans Kinck.
- Agwimoon (1920), sank as Altair in 1943 :
- Agwihavre (1921), sank as Gulfpenn in 1942
- Manata (1916), sank as Trym in 1837
- Ozama (1919), sank in 1928
- Panuco (1917), sank in fire at dock in 1941
- Choctaw (1917), sank as Syoka Maru in 1945
- Agwipond period (1921), sank in 1930 as Cities Service Boston
- Agwibay (1921), sank as William F. Humphrey in 1942
- Agwisea (1920), sank in 1933

== Clyde Line ships ==
Clyde Line ships:

- Apache
- Mohawk (1908)
- Lenape (1912)
- Huron (1896)
- Comanche
- Arapahoe
- Cherokee (1925), sunk by U-boat June 16, 1942
- Chippewa (1905), (freight only)
- Philadelphia (1916)

== Clyde Santo Domingo Line ships ==
Passenger and cargo from New York City to Monte Cristi, Puerto Plata, Samana, Sanchez, La Romana, Macoris, Santo Domingo City Azua and Barahona.
Clyde Santo Domingo Line ships:

- Algonquin (1926)
- Iroquois

== Mallory Line ships ==
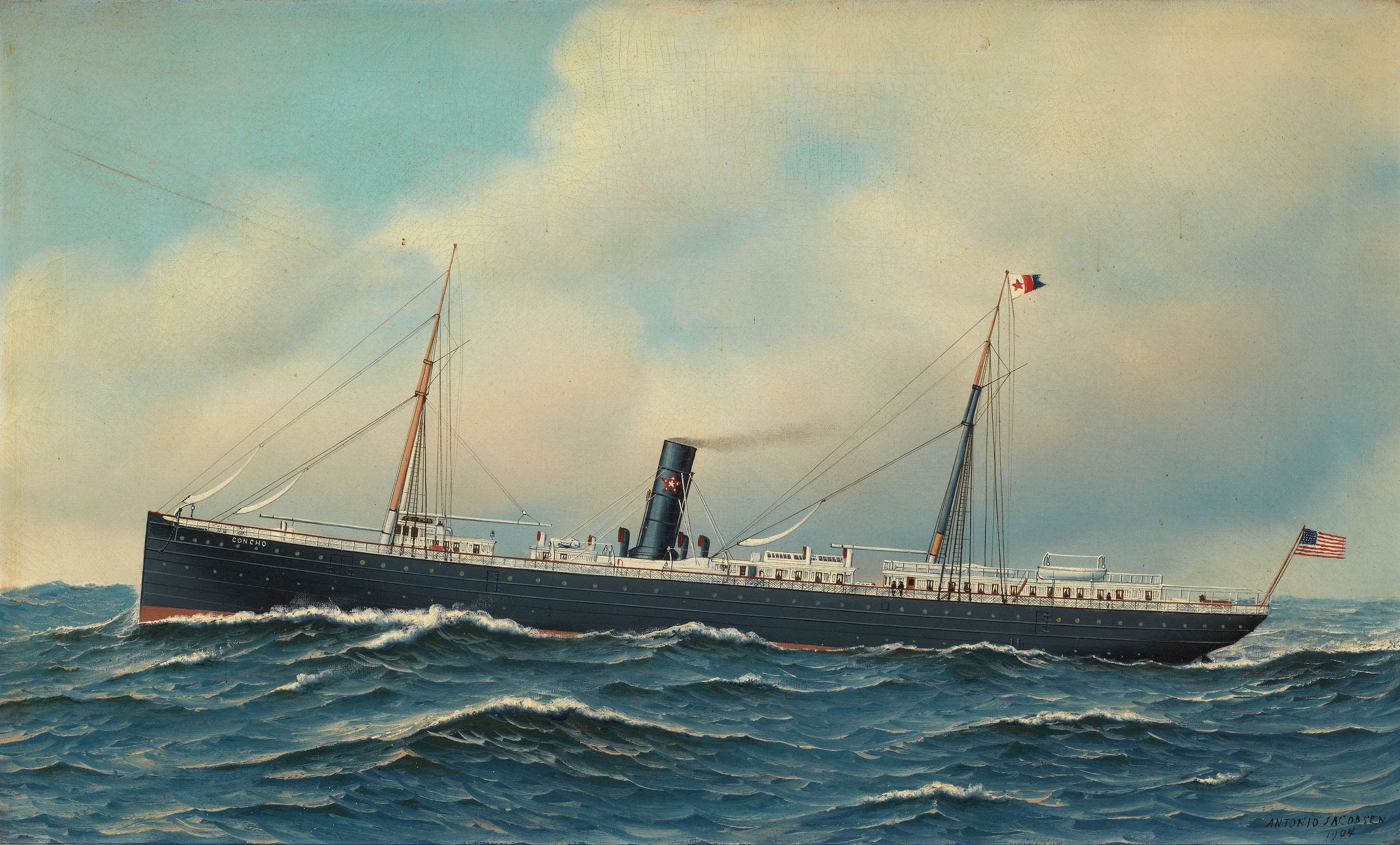
The Steamship Concho, 1904 by Antonio Jacobsen

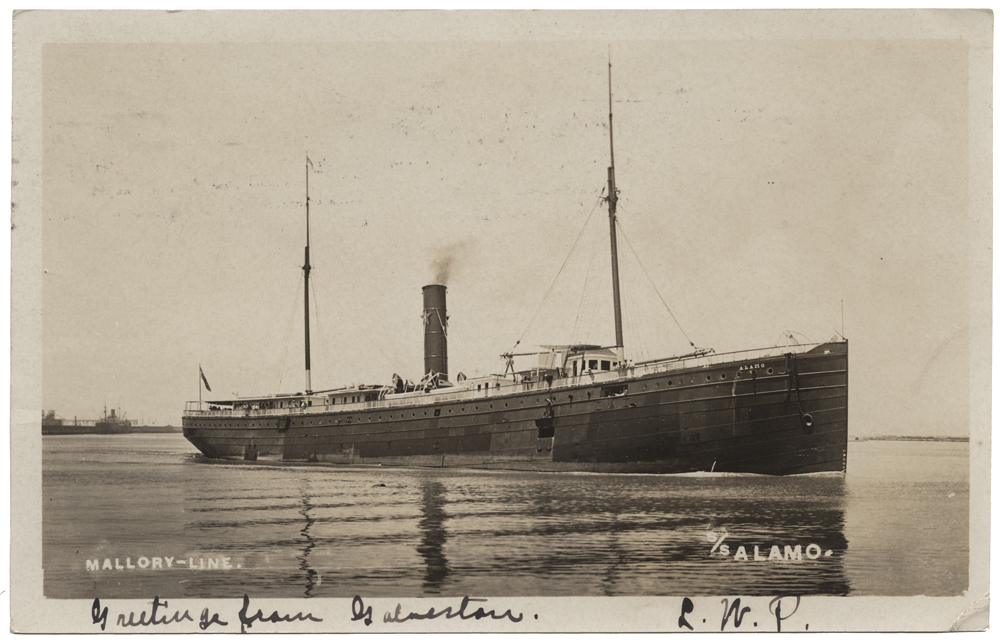
Alamo

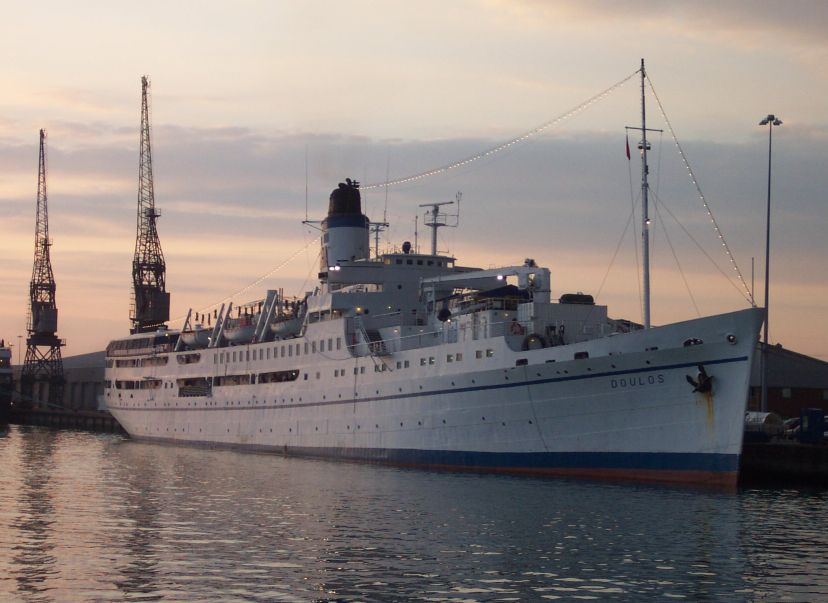
Medina as Doulos Phos at Southampton, England in 2004

Mallory Line ships:

- Comal
- San Jacinto (1903)
- Concho (1903)
- Sabine
- Lampasas
- Alamo
- Medina (1914)
- Nueces (1887)
- West Cawthon (1919), manager
- City of Houston (1871)
- Barges: Chas. E. Goin, C. F. Deering, P. C. Golder, Samuel Walker, O. M. Hitchcock (1881)
- Annie M. Smull (1868), sank in 1906

== Porto Rico Line ships ==
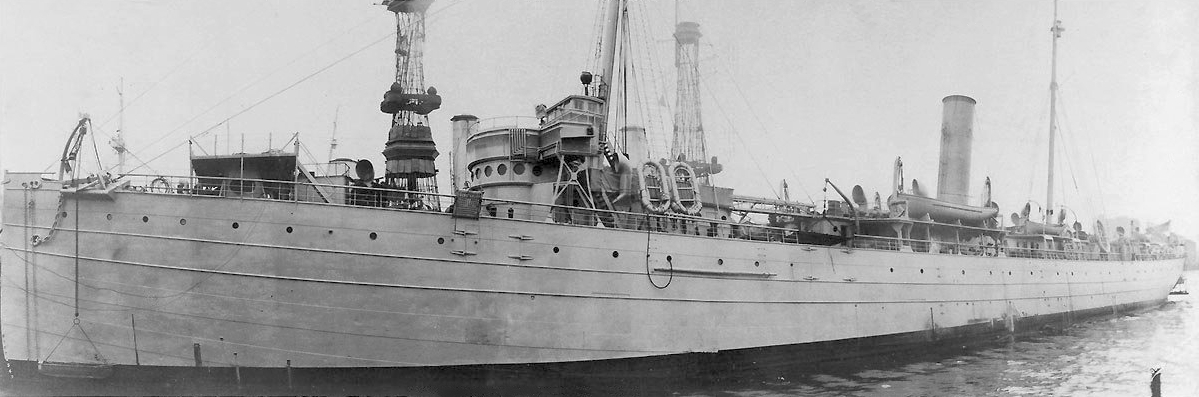
Brazos in Boston Harbor in 1919

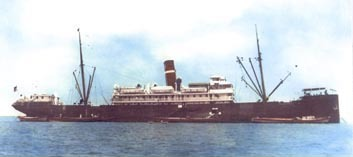
San Juan in 1901

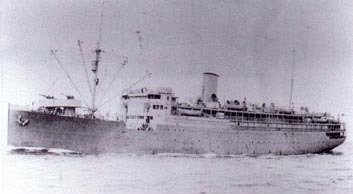
Coamo

- Porto Rico Line ships:
- Coamo (1925), sunk by U-boat in 1942
- Brazos (1889), sunk by U-boat 1941
- Carolina, sunk by U-boat 1918
- San Juan (1900)
- San Lorenzo
- Porto Rico
- Ponce
- Borinquen (1930), sank in 1970
- San Jacinto
- Mariana (1915), sunk by U-boat in 1942

== Ward Line ships ==
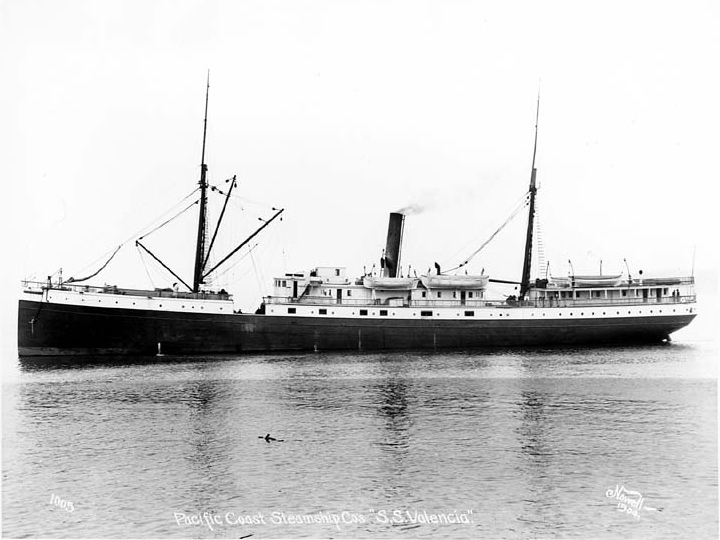
Valencia in 1904

Passenger steamships of the Ward Line:

- Varuna (1869) sank in 1870
- SS City of Washington (1877)
- SS Niagara (1877)
- SS Saratoga (1877)
- SS City of Alexandria (1879)
- SS Santiago (1879)
- SS Saratoga (1879)
- SS Newport (1880)
- SS Cinfuegos (1883)
- SS Seneca (1884)
- SS Orizaba (1889)
- SS Seguranca (1889)
- SS Yumuri (1889)
- SS Vigilancia (1890)
- SS Yucatan (1890)
- SS Valencia (1897) – Chartered from the Red D Line.
- SS Havana (1898)
- SS Mexico (1898)
- SS Morro Castle (1900)
- SS Esperanza (1901)
- SS Monterey (1901)
- SS Yucatan (1903)
- SS Havana (1906)
- SS Merida (1906)
- SS Mexico (1906)
- SS Saratoga (1907)
- SS Orizaba (1917)
- SS Siboney (1918)
- SS Morro Castle (1930)
- SS Oriente (1930)
- SS Mexico (1933)
- SS Monterey (1933)
- SS Agwiprince (1941)

== Clyde-Mallory Line ships ==
Clyde-Mallory Line ships:

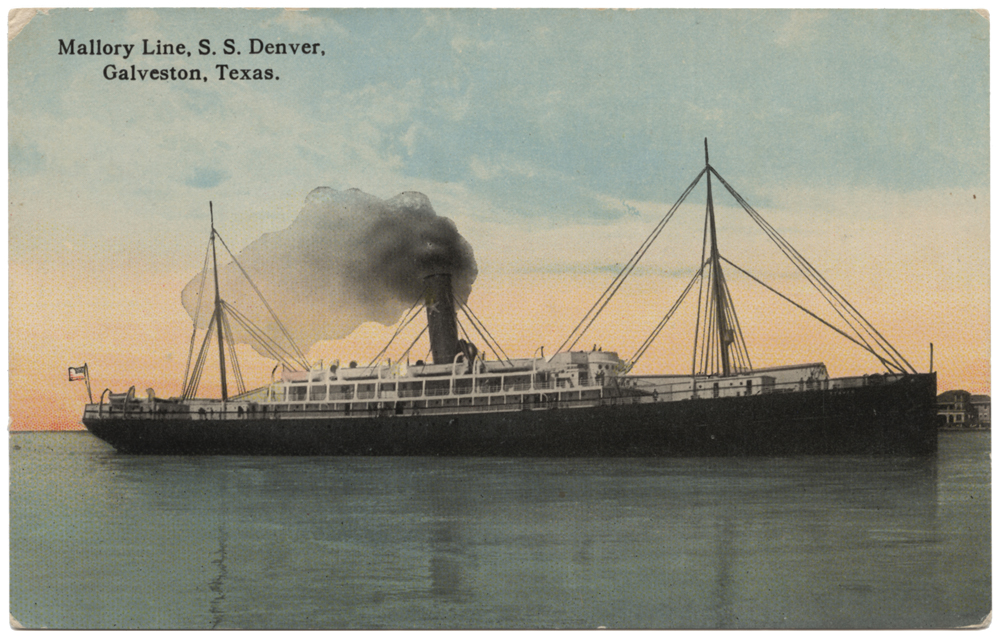
Denver in Galveston, Texas

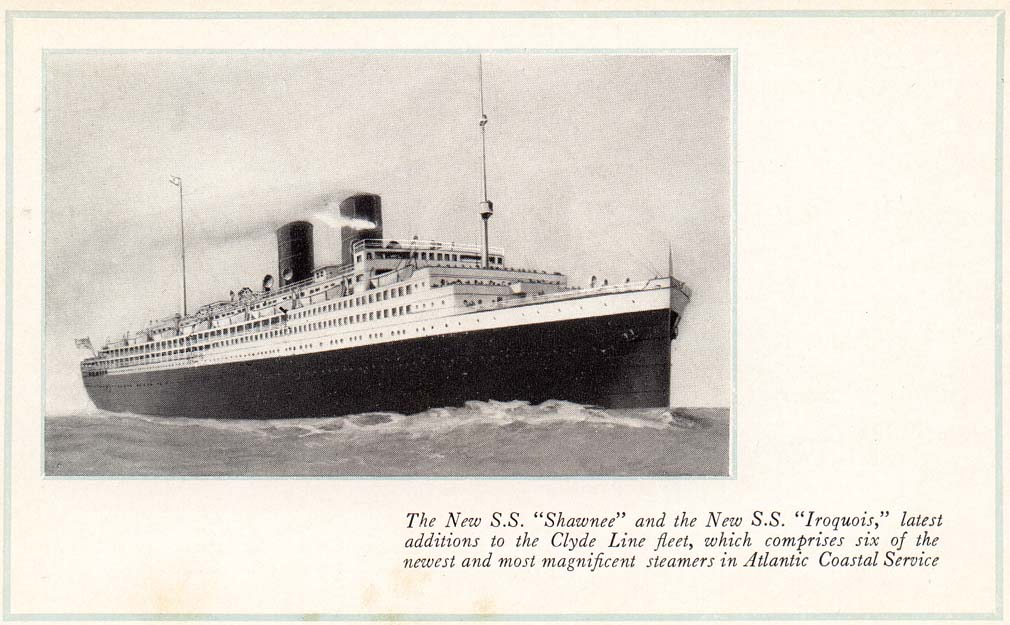
Shawnee in 1927

Ship and year built

- Agwistar 1919
- Alamo (1) 1883
- Alamo (2) 1919
- Ansonia 1919
- Brazos (1) 1899
- Brazos (2) 1907
- Carondelet 1873
- Carib 1882, sank in 1915
- City of Dallas 1872
- City of Galveston 1870, sank in 1876
- City of San Antonio 1872
- City of Waco 1873
- Colorado (1) 1879
- Colorado (2) 1920
- Comal 1885
- Concho 1891
- Denver 1901
- Edward S. Atwood 1911 (tug)
- Glendaruel 1917
- Guadalupe 1881
- Henry R. Mallory 1916
- Lake Ellithorpe 1919, sank as Empire Kestrel
- Lampasas 1883
- Kiowa 1903, sank in 1903
- Leona 1889
- Malabar 1914
- Malacca 1919
- Malamton 1918
- Malang 1920
- Malantic 1918 (M.J. Scanlon) sank in 1943 by Uboat
- Malay
- Malchace 1920
- Mallard 1917
- Mallemak 1919
- Malsah 1920
- Malton 1923
- Maltran 1920
- Medina 1914
- Minotaur 1918, sunk in 1943 by U-boat
- Mohawk (1925)
- Mohican (1904), sank 1925
- Neches (1) 1914
- Neches (2) 1919, sank 1930
- Norfolk (1916)
- Nueces 1887
- Ormidale 1917
- Oneida (1919), sank in 1943 in storm
- Osceola 1920
- Onondaga 1905, sank in 1918
- Pecos 1899
- Rio Grande 1876
- Sabine
- San Jacinto 1903
- San Marcos 1881
- San Saba 1879, sank as Magnolia in 1918
- Shawnee 1927
- State of Texas 1873
- Swiftarrow 1921
- Swifteagle 1921, sank in 1934
- Swiftlight 1921
- Swiftscout 1921, sunk in 1945 by U-boat
- Swiftstar 1921, sank in 1923
- Swiftsure 1921
- Swiftwind 1921
- Western Texas 1877
- Victor 1864, sank in 1872

== World War II ships ==
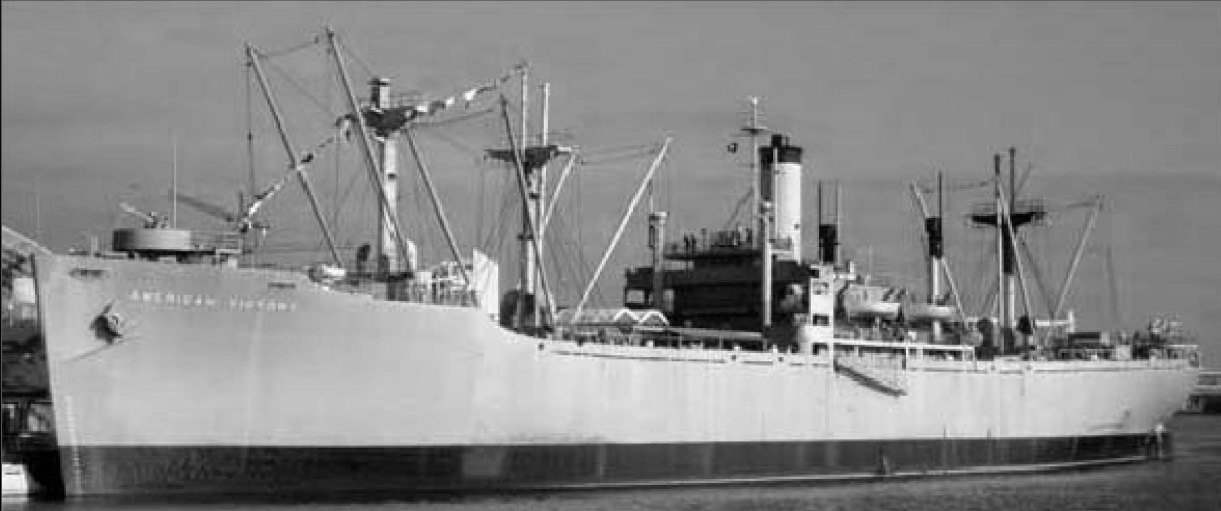
A VC2-S-AP2 type Victory ship

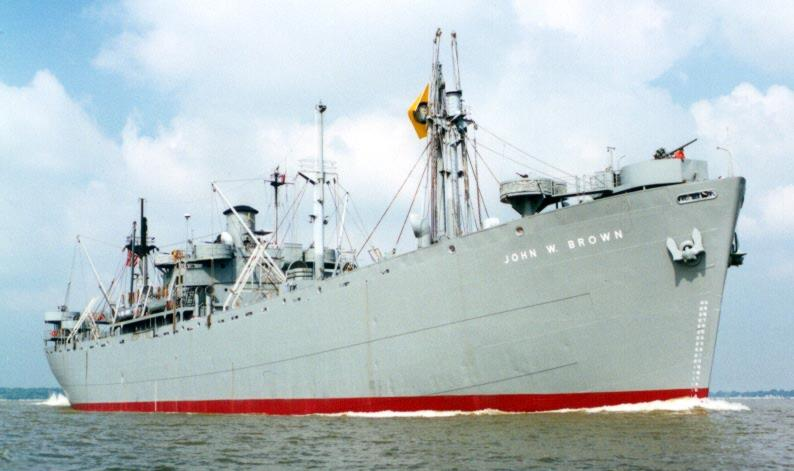
SS John W. Brown, one of four surviving Liberty ships in 2000

World War II chartered ships operated by Agwilines Inc.:

- Anne Bradstreeet
- Beatrice Victory
- Berwyn Victory
- Coastal Archer
- Bucknell Victory
- Durham Victory
- Dorchester
- Ethiopia Victory
- Elwin F. Knowles
- Fisk Victory
- Frontenac Victory
- George Wythe
- James Guthrie
- James Iredell, sank after attack in 1943
- James Rolph
- Jeremiah Van Rensselaer, sunk in 1943 by U-boat
- John Harvey
- Jonas Lie
- Joseph K. Toole
- Joseph Stanton
- Joseph R. Lamar
- H. H. Raymond
- C. Francis Jenkins
- St. Lawrence Victory
- Louis Pasteur
- Lake Elsmere
- Marine Fiddler
- Morris Hillquit
- Luther Martin
- Montclair Victory
- Oliver Ellsworth
- Richard Montgomery
- Robert Treat Paine
- Elihu Root
- Raymond V. Ingersoll
- Robert Trimble
- Robert Y. Hayne
- Samuel W. Williston
- Theodore Parker
- Trakai
- Thomas Sim Lee
- Thomas Hill
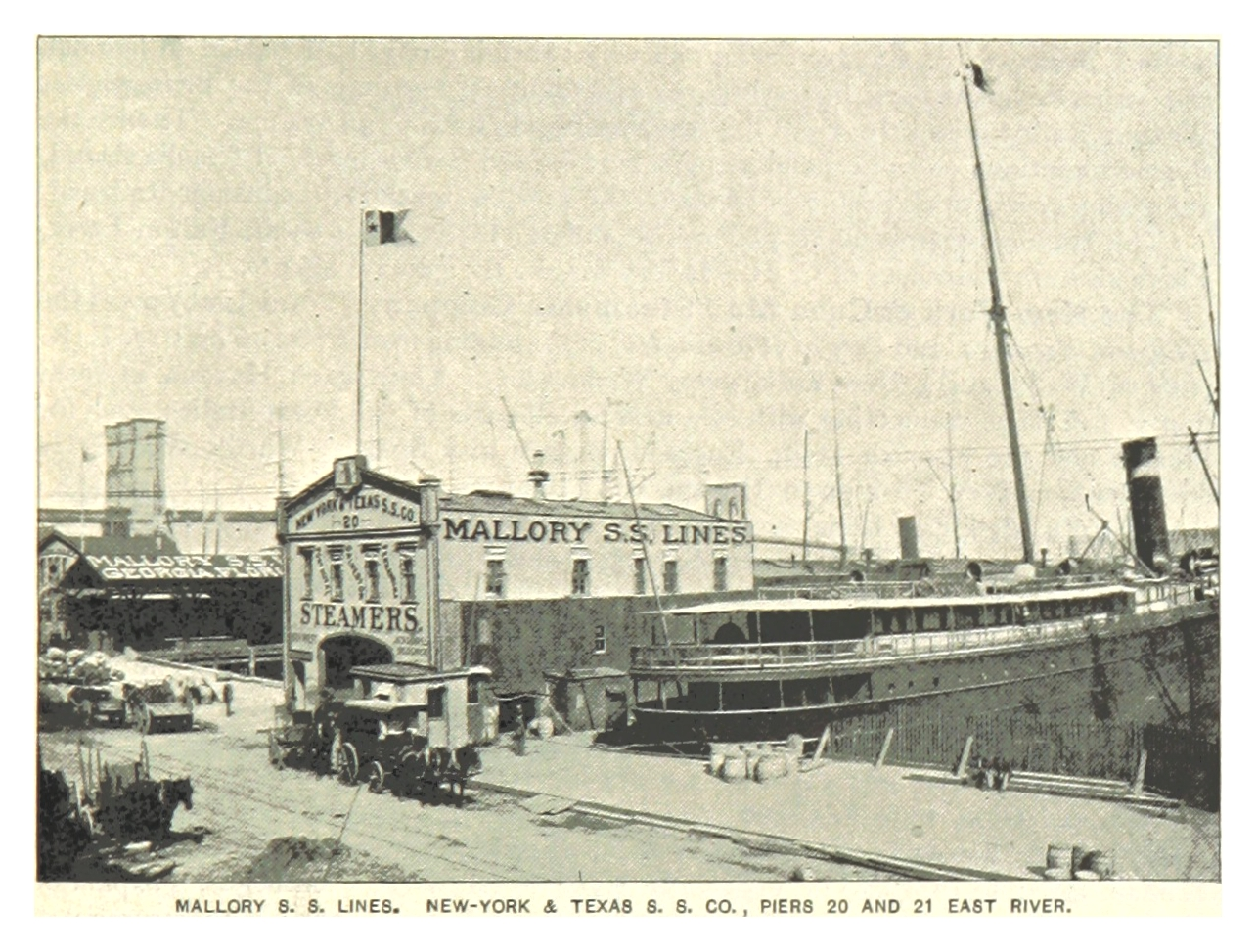
1893 Mallory Line

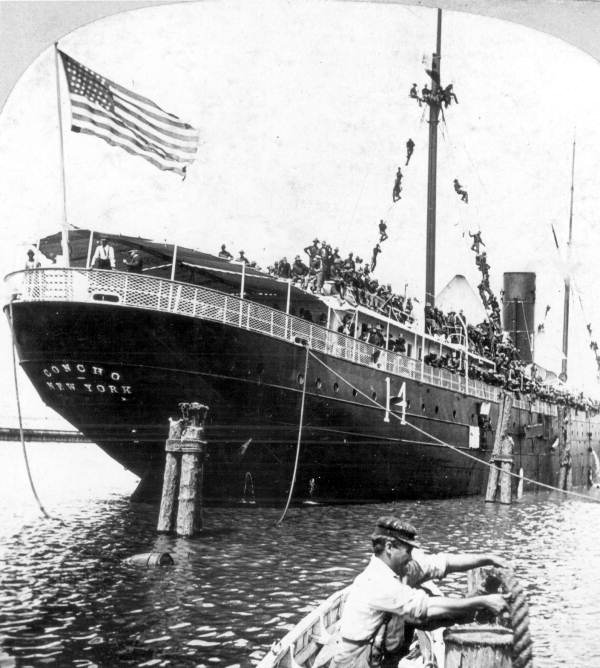
Roosevelt's Rough Riders leaving Tampa aboard the transport Concho headed for Santiago de Cuba

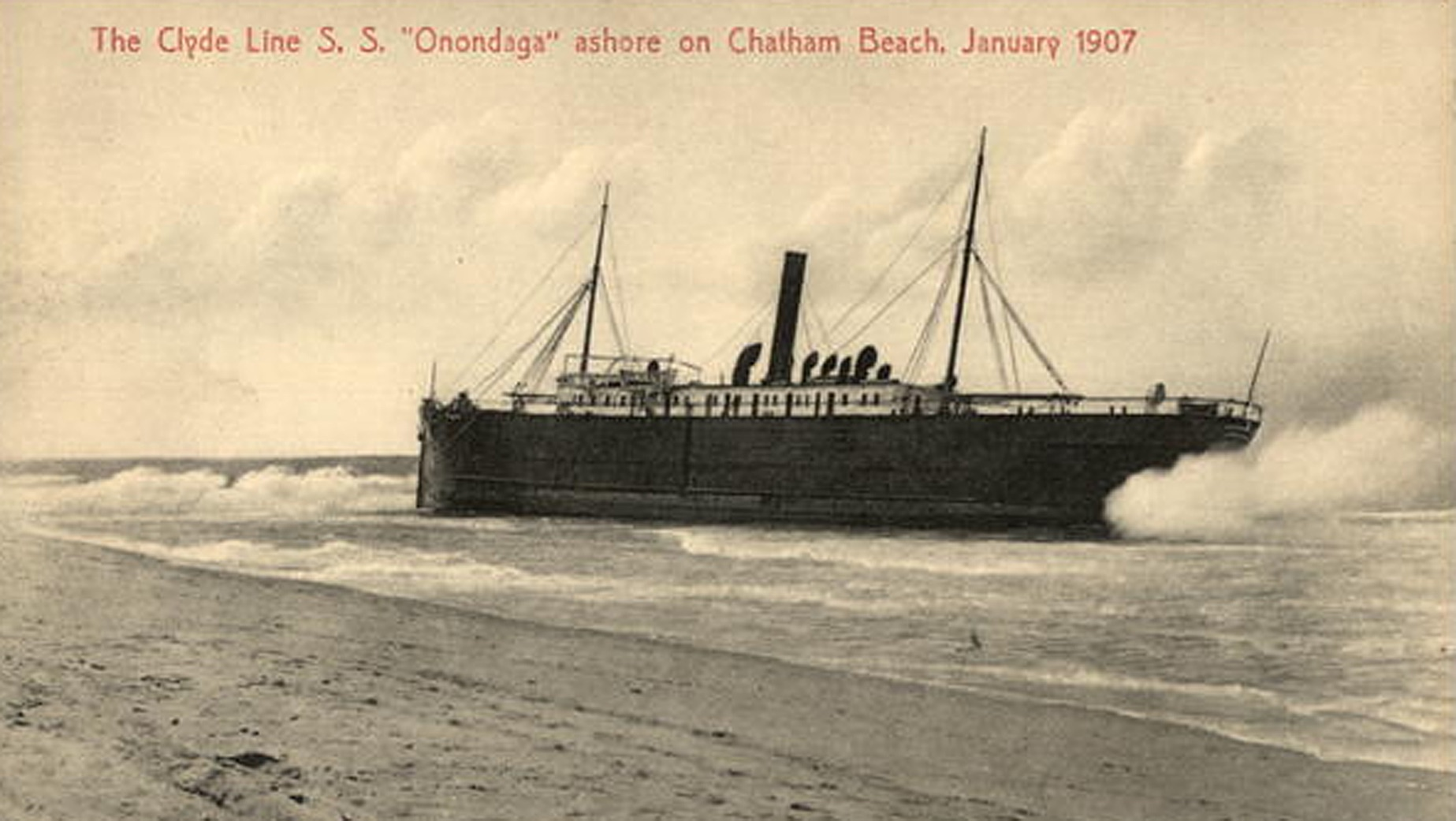
Onondaga on Orleans Beach after running aground on January 13, 1907

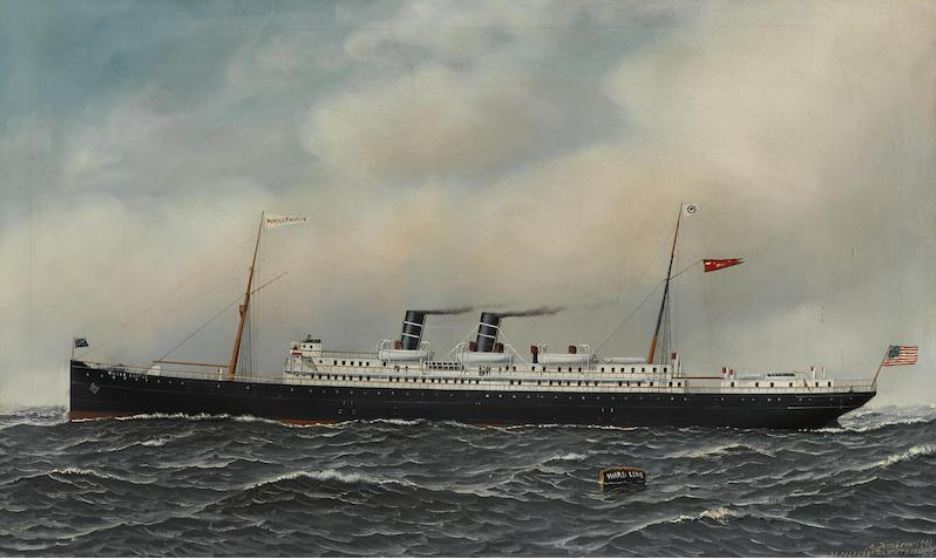
Morro Castle of Ward Line at sea in 1901
