= Skink (disambiguation) =

The skinks are a family of lizards.

Skink may also refer to:

- Skink anti-aircraft tank, a Canadian World War II armoured vehicle developed but not put into service
- USS Skink (SP-605), a United States Navy patrol vessel in commission from 1917 to 1918
- Pseudonym of Clinton Tyree, a recurring character in novels by Carl Hiaasen
- The Skinks, a unit from the Warhammer Lizardmen army
- Cullen skink, a thick Scottish soup
- Skink (record label), a vanity label of Spinnin' Records
