= Kiowa (disambiguation) =

The Kiowa are a nation of Native Americans.

Kiowa may also refer to:

== Places ==
=== United States ===
- Kiowa, Colorado
- Kiowa, Kansas
- Kiowa, Montana
- Kiowa, Nebraska, a ghost town
- Kiowa, Oklahoma
- Fort Kiowa, South Dakota

== Other uses ==
- Bell OH-58 Kiowa, a family of single-engine, single-rotor, observation and light attack helicopters
- Kiowa language, a Kiowa-Tanoan language
- Kiowa Shale, a geological unit in Kansas and neighboring states
- SS Kiowa, several steamships
- USS Kiowa, ships of the United States Navy

== See also ==
- Kiowa County (disambiguation)
- Kiowa National Grassland, New Mexico, US
- Lake Kiowa, Texas, a census-designated place
- American Indians of Iowa
- Kiawah people, South Carolina, US
- Kyiv, capital of Ukraine
