= USS Kiowa (SP-711) =

Patrol vessel of the United States Navy

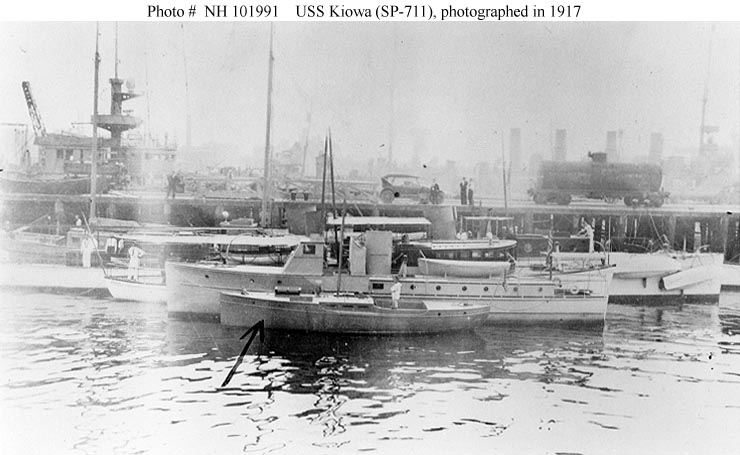
- USS Kiowa (SP-711) at the time of her acquisition by the U.S. Navy in May 1917.

History

United States
- Name: USS Kiowa (1917-1918); USS SP-711 (1918-1919)
- Namesake: Kiowa was a previous name retained; SP-711 was her section patrol number
- Builder: George Lawley & Son, Neponset, Massachusetts
- Completed: 1915
- Acquired: 5 May 1917
- Commissioned: 14 May or 18 June 1917
- Decommissioned: 24 November 1918
- Renamed: USS SP-711 April 1918
- Fate: Returned to owner 28 March 1919
- Notes: Operated as private motorboat Kiowa 1915-1917 and from 1919

General characteristics
- Type: Patrol vessel
- Length: 35 ft (11 m)
- Beam: 9 ft (2.7 m)
- Draft: 3 ft 6 in (1.07 m)
- Speed: 10 knots
- Armament: 1 × .30-caliber (7.62-mm) machine gun

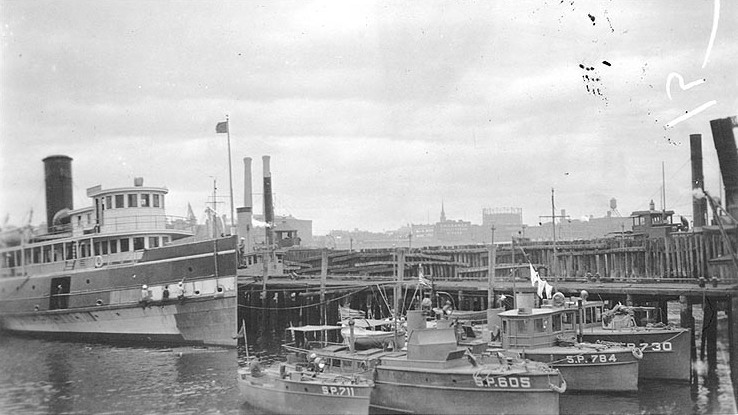
U.S. Navy patrol vessels at Lockwood's Basin in Boston, Massachusetts, ca. 1918. Starting from the bottom center, from left to right they are USS Kiowa (SP-711), USS Skink (SP-605), USS Whistler (SP-784), and USS Lynx II (SP-730). The passenger-cargo ship USS Moosehead (ID-2047) is at left.

The first USS Kiowa (SP-711), later USS SP-711, was a United States Navy patrol vessel in commission from 1917 to 1918.

Kiowa was built as a private motorboat of the same name by George Lawley & Son at Neponset, Massachusetts, in 1915. On 5 May 1917, the U.S. Navy acquired her from her owner, Frank A. Marwell, for use as a section patrol boat during World War I. She was commissioned as USS Kiowa (SP-711) on either 14 May or 18 June 1917.

Assigned to the 1st Naval District in northern New England, Kiowa carried out patrol duties in the Boston, Massachusetts, area for the rest of World War I. In April 1918, she was renamed USS SP-711, presumably to avoid confusion with the cargo ship USS Kiowa (ID-1842), which had been commissioned in February 1918.

SP-711 was decommissioned on 24 November 1918 and returned to Marwell on 28 March 1919.
