= USS Moosehead (ID-2047) =

Cargo ship of the United States Navy

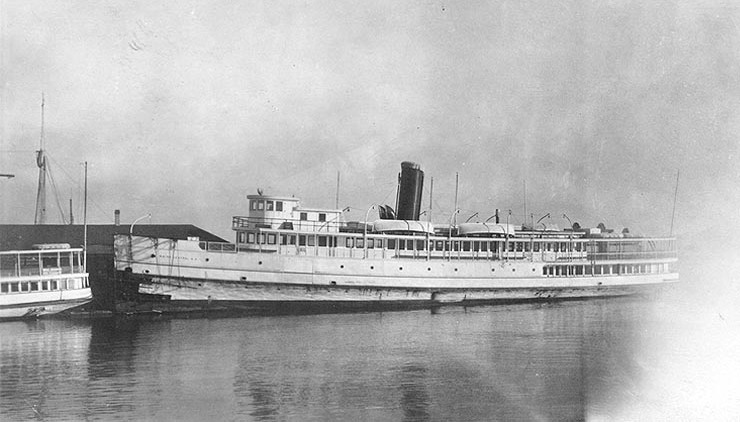
- SS Moosehead in port with Maine Central Railroad markings on her bow ca. 1917-1918, prior to her U.S. Navy service.

History

United States
- Name: USS Moosehead (1918-1920); USS Porpoise (1920-1931)
- Namesake: Moosehead was her previous name retained; Porpoise was for the porpoise, any of several small gregarious toothed whales of the genus Phocaena
- Builder: Bath Iron Works, Bath, Maine
- Launched: 4 March 1911
- Completed: 1911
- Acquired: 28 March 1918
- Commissioned: 1918
- Decommissioned: 1930
- Renamed: USS Porpoise 11 August or 8 November 1920
- Reclassified: From ID-2047 to YFB-2047 11 August or 8 November 1920
- Stricken: 30 December 1930
- Fate: Sold 24 February 1931, wrecked 17 December 1941
- Notes: Served as commercial steamer SS Moosehead 1911-1918

General characteristics
- Type: Steamer
- Displacement: 710 tons
- Length: 194 ft 11 in (59.41 m)
- Beam: 35 ft 9 in (10.90 m)
- Draft: 10 ft 9 in (3.28 m) mean
- Propulsion: Steam engine

The first USS Moosehead (ID-2047), later the fourth USS Porpoise (YFB-2047), was a steamer that served in the United States Navy from 1918 to 1930.

== Origin ==
Moosehead was built as the commercial steamer SS Moosehead in 1911 by Bath Iron Works at Bath, Maine, Maine. On 13 November 1917, the U.S. Navy's 1st Naval District in northern New England inspected her for possible World War I service and, found her acceptable. She was assigned the naval registry identification number 2047 and earmarked for use as a "mine planter" (minelayer). The Navy authorized the Commandant of the 1st Naval District to accept Moosehead with full title from the United States Shipping Board when she was offered for delivery. He was also told that instructions for conversion of Moosehead into a transport for special service would be furnished at some future time.

The Navy acquired Moosehead from her owner, the Maine Central Railroad Company of Portland, Maine, on 28 March 1918. On 11 June 1918, she was slated for operation under the Navy Account by the Naval Overseas Transportation Service (NOTS) in coastwise trade, and the Commandant, 1st Naval District, was authorized to fit her out for that service. Moosehead's deck logs commenced on 1 July 1918, which may have been the time she entered service; her commissioning date is unclear, but she was commissioned in 1918 as USS Moosehead (ID-2047).

== U.S. Navy service ==
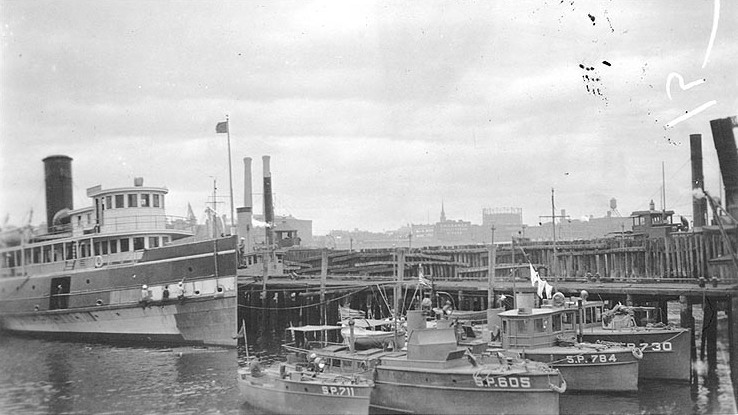
USS Moosehead (ID-2047) is at left in this photograph of Lockwood's Basin in Boston, Massachusetts, ca. 1918. With her are a number of U.S. Navy patrol vessels: from left to right starting at bottom center they are USS Kiowa (SP-711), USS Skink (SP-605), USS Whistler (SP-784), and USS Lynx II (SP-730).

Detached from NOTS and assigned to the United States Atlantic Fleet's fleet train on 13 July 1918, Moosehead received orders on 16 July 1918 to proceed to Washington, D.C., to report to the Commandant, Washington Navy Yard, for temporary duty on the ferry route on the Potomac River between Washington and Indian Head, Maryland. On 15 January 1919, the Commandant of the 5th Naval District received word that Moosehead was assigned to duty at the Washington Navy Yard temporarily.

In 1920, Moosehead was reclassified as a ferry, redesignated YFB-2047, and renamed USS Porpoise, becoming the fourth ship of that name. Various dates are given for these events. The U.S. Navy adopted its modern hull number system on 17 July 1920, which would have spurred her redesignation as YFB-2047, but sources state both that she became YFB-2047 on 11 August and on 8 November 1920. Sources also differ on the date of her renaming, offering both 11 August and 8 November 1920 as the date she became Porpoise.

Despite her purportedly temporary assignment there, Porpoise remained assigned to the Washington Navy Yard until stricken from the Navy List on 30 December 1930. She was sold on 24 February 1931.
