= SS H. H. Raymond =

World War II Liberty ship of the United States

History

United States
- Name: H. H. Raymond
- Namesake: Henry H. Raymond
- Owner: War Shipping Administration (WSA)
- Operator: Agwilines Inc.
- Ordered: as type (EC2-S-C1) hull, MC hull 2303
- Builder: J.A. Jones Construction, Panama City, Florida
- Cost: $982,299
- Yard number: 44
- Way number: 4
- Laid down: 13 April 1944
- Launched: 24 May 1944
- Sponsored by: Corporal Alice Howard
- Completed: 14 June 1944
- Identification: Call Signal: WPIQ
- Fate: Laid up in National Defense Reserve Fleet, Olympia, Washington, 18 August 1949; Laid up in National Defense Reserve Fleet, Hudson River Group, 9 June 1952; Sold for scrapping, 15 May 1970

General characteristics
- Class & type: Liberty ship; type EC2-S-C1, standard
- Tonnage: 10,865 LT DWT; 7,176 GRT
- Displacement: 3,380 long tons (3,434 t) (light); 14,245 long tons (14,474 t) (max)
- Length: 441 feet 6 inches (135 m) oa; 416 feet (127 m) pp; 427 feet (130 m) lwl
- Beam: 57 feet (17 m)
- Draft: 27 ft 9.25 in (8.4646 m)
- Installed power: 2 × Oil fired 450 °F (232 °C) boilers, operating at 220 psi (1,500 kPa); 2,500 hp (1,900 kW)
- Propulsion: 1 × triple-expansion steam engine, (manufactured by General Machinery Corp., Hamilton, Ohio); 1 × screw propeller
- Speed: 11.5 knots (21.3 km/h; 13.2 mph)
- Capacity: 562,608 cubic feet (15,931 m^{3}) (grain); 499,573 cubic feet (14,146 m^{3}) (bale)
- Complement: 38–62 USMM; 21–40 USNAG
- Armament: Varied by ship; Bow-mounted 3-inch (76 mm)/50-caliber gun; Stern-mounted 4-inch (102 mm)/50-caliber gun; 2–8 × single 20-millimeter (0.79 in) Oerlikon anti-aircraft (AA) cannons and/or, 2–8 × 37-millimeter (1.46 in) M1 AA guns

SS H. H. Raymond was a Liberty ship built in the United States during World War II. She was named after Henry H. Raymond, president and general manager of the Clyde Steamship and Mallory Steamship Companies. He was appointed by the Shipping Board during World War I as the first Federal Controller of Shipping.

== Construction ==
H. H. Raymond was laid down on 13 April 1944, under a Maritime Commission (MARCOM) contract, MC hull 2303, by J.A. Jones Construction, Panama City, Florida; she was sponsored by Corporal Alice Howard, and launched on 24 May 1944.

== History ==
She was allocated to Agwilines Inc., on 14 June 1944. On 18 August 1949, she was laid up in the National Defense Reserve Fleet, in Olympia, Washington. On 9 June 1952, she was relocated to the National Defense Reserve Fleet, in the Hudson River Group. Starting on 18 June 1953, she was withdrawn from the fleet to be loaded with grain as part of the "Grain Program 1953". She returned to the fleet on 26 June 1953, full of grain. On 22 May 1956, she was withdrawn to unload and reload with grain. She returned on 14 June 1956, with another load of grain. She was withdrawn on 31 March 1960, to be unloaded but the floating elevator where she was to discharge was shut down due to a strike, she returned to the fleet with the same load on 5 April 1960. On 7 March 1961, she was again withdrawn to unload the grain and returned to the fleet empty on 15 March 1961. On 13 November 1961, she was withdrawn for the last time to be loaded with grain, she returned full on 28 November 1961. She was withdrawn on 29 July 1963, to be emptied and returned 3 August 1963. On 15 May 1970, she was sold to Union Minerals and Alloys Corporation, to be scrapped. She was removed from the fleet on 30 June 1970.

== Bibliography ==
- "Jones Construction, Panama City FL". www.ShipbuildingHistory.com. 13 October 2010.
- "Liberty Ships – World War II".
- Maritime Administration. "H. H. Raymond". Ship History Database Vessel Status Card. U.S. Department of Transportation, Maritime Administration. Archived from the original on 12 December 2019.
- Davies, James (May 2004). "Specifications (As-Built)" (PDF). p. 23.
- "SS H. H. Raymond ".
