= SS James Iredell =

World War II Liberty ship of the United States

History

United States
- Name: James Iredell
- Namesake: James Iredell
- Operator: Agwilines Inc
- Ordered: as SS James Iredell; EC2-S-C1 hull
- Yard number: 45
- Way number: 9
- Laid down: 25 October 1942
- Launched: 29 November 1942
- Acquired: 1943
- Commissioned: 1943
- Decommissioned: 1944
- Stricken: 23 October 1943, in Naples
- Fate: Scuttled on 8 June 1944, to protect Omaha Beach

General characteristics
- Class & type: Crater-class cargo ship
- Displacement: 4,023 t.(lt) 11,565 t.(fl)
- Length: 441 ft 6 in (134.57 m)
- Beam: 56 ft 11 in (17.35 m)
- Draft: 28 ft 4 in (8.64 m)
- Propulsion: reciprocating steam engine, single shaft
- Speed: 12 kts.
- Complement: 206

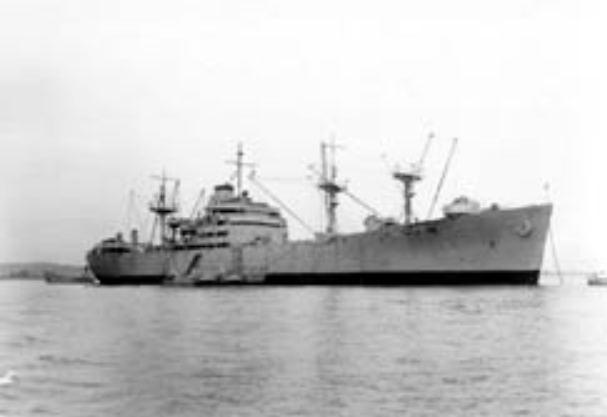
SS James Iredell c. 1941

SS James Iredell (MC contract 867) was a Liberty ship in World War II that was attacked in Naples and scuttled on June 8, 1944, to protect Omaha Beach.

== History ==
SS James Iredell had its keel laid down on 25 October 1942, by the North Carolina Shipbuilding Company, of Wilmington, North Carolina. She was launched on 29 November 1942. She suffered minor damage while in a convoy in 1943.

She was quickly repaired, and bombed in Naples, on 23 October 1943, with three direct hits. The gasoline the ship was transporting caught on fire and the ship was abandoned. The fire burned for 64 hours, but there were no casualties among the 44-man merchant crew, the 28-man United States Navy contingent, or the 28 passengers.

She was repaired, and was sunk as a blockship off Omaha Beach on 8 June 1944.
