= SS Elihu Root =

Liberty ship of WWII

History

United States
- Name: Elihu Root
- Namesake: Elihu Root
- Owner: War Shipping Administration (WSA)
- Operator: Agwilines, Inc.
- Ordered: as type (EC2-S-C1) hull, MC hull 1524
- Builder: J.A. Jones Construction, Panama City, Florida
- Cost: $1,947,184
- Yard number: 6
- Way number: 6
- Laid down: 5 October 1942
- Launched: 19 May 1943
- Sponsored by: Mrs. Lloyd Tower
- Completed: 18 June 1943
- Identification: Call Signal: KLXY
- Fate: Laid up in the National Defense Reserve Fleet, Hudson River Reserve Fleet, Jones Point, New York, 5 June 1946; Sold for scrapping, 10 October 1969

General characteristics
- Class & type: Liberty ship; type EC2-S-C1, standard
- Tonnage: 10,865 LT DWT; 7,176 GRT
- Displacement: 3,380 long tons (3,434 t) (light); 14,245 long tons (14,474 t) (max)
- Length: 441 feet 6 inches (135 m) oa; 416 feet (127 m) pp; 427 feet (130 m) lwl
- Beam: 57 feet (17 m)
- Draft: 27 ft 9.25 in (8.4646 m)
- Installed power: 2 × Oil fired 450 °F (232 °C) boilers, operating at 220 psi (1,500 kPa); 2,500 hp (1,900 kW)
- Propulsion: 1 × triple-expansion steam engine, (manufactured by General Machinery Corp., Hamilton, Ohio); 1 × screw propeller
- Speed: 11.5 knots (21.3 km/h; 13.2 mph)
- Capacity: 562,608 cubic feet (15,931 m^{3}) (grain); 499,573 cubic feet (14,146 m^{3}) (bale)
- Complement: 38–62 USMM; 21–40 USNAG
- Armament: Varied by ship; Bow-mounted 3-inch (76 mm)/50-caliber gun; Stern-mounted 4-inch (102 mm)/50-caliber gun; 2–8 × single 20-millimeter (0.79 in) Oerlikon anti-aircraft (AA) cannons and/or, 2–8 × 37-millimeter (1.46 in) M1 AA guns

SS Elihu Root was a Liberty ship built in the United States during World War II. She was named after Elihu Root, a United States senator from New York, the United States Secretary of War under presidents William McKinley and Theodore Roosevelt, the United States Secretary of State under Theodore Roosevelt, and the 1912 Nobel Peace Prize laureate.

== Construction ==
Elihu Root was laid down on 5 October 1942, under a Maritime Commission (MARCOM) contract, MC hull 1524, by J.A. Jones Construction, Panama City, Florida; sponsored by Mrs. Lloyd Tower, sister of the assistant superintendent of the boiler shop, W. H. Moyd, she was launched on 19 May 1943.

== History ==
She was allocated to Agwilines Inc., on 18 June 1943. On 5 June 1946, she was laid up in the National Defense Reserve Fleet, in the Hudson River Group. On 29 May 1953, she was withdrawn from the fleet to be loaded with grain under the "Grain Program 1953", she returned loaded with grain on 9 June 1953. She was withdrawn from the fleet on 20 June 1957, to have the grain unloaded, she returned empty on 29 June 1957. On 28 May 1958, she was withdrawn from the fleet to be loaded with grain under the "Grain Program 1958", she returned loaded with grain on 13 June 1958. She was withdrawn from the fleet on 8 February 1960, to have the grain unloaded, she returned empty on 12 February 1960. On 9 November 1960, she was withdrawn from the fleet to be loaded with grain under the "Grain Program 1960", she returned loaded with grain on 22 November 1960. She was withdrawn from the fleet on 14 March 1963, to have the grain unloaded, she returned empty on 18 March 1963. On 10 October 1969, she was sold for $42,218 to Union Minerals and Alloys Corporation, for scrapping. She was removed from the fleet on 30 October 1969.

== Bibliography ==
- "Jones Construction, Panama City FL". www.ShipbuildingHistory.com. 13 October 2010.
- Maritime Administration. "Elihu Root". Ship History Database Vessel Status Card. U.S. Department of Transportation, Maritime Administration.
- Davies, James (May 2004). "Specifications (As-Built)" (PDF). p. 23.
- "SS Elihu Root".
