= USS Lehigh (AK-192) =

Cargo ship of the United States Navy

History

United States
- Name: Coastal Expounder (1944–1945); Lehigh (1945)
- Namesake: Lehigh County, Pennsylvania
- Ordered: as type (C1-M-AV1) hull, MC hull 2123
- Builder: Walter Butler Shipbuilders, Inc., Superior, Wisconsin
- Yard number: 41
- Laid down: 8 June 1944
- Launched: 25 November 1944
- Sponsored by: Mrs. Stanley Butler
- Acquired: 30 July 1945
- Commissioned: 13 September 1945
- Decommissioned: 6 November 1945
- Stricken: date unknown
- Identification: Hull symbol: AK-192; Code letters: NEOC
- Fate: returned to Maritime Commission, 6 November 1945

History

United States
- Name: Coastal Archer
- Owner: Maritime Commission
- Operator: T.J. Stevenson & Company (1945); New York and Cuba Mail (1946); Agwilines Inc. (1946)
- Acquired: 6 November 1945
- In service: 6 November 1945
- Out of service: 15 February 1948
- Fate: Sold, 7 March 1947

History

Brazil
- Name: Rio Solimões
- Namesake: Solimões River
- Operator: Lloyd Brasileiro, Patrimonio Nicional
- Acquired: 15 February 1947
- In service: 7 March 1947
- Fate: Scrapped 1969

General characteristics
- Class & type: Alamosa-class cargo ship
- Type: C1-M-AV1
- Tonnage: 5,032 long tons deadweight (DWT)
- Displacement: 2,382 long tons (2,420 t) (standard); 7,450 long tons (7,570 t) (full load)
- Length: 388 ft 8 in (118.47 m)
- Beam: 50 ft (15 m)
- Draft: 21 ft 1 in (6.43 m)
- Installed power: 1 × Nordberg, TSM 6 diesel engine; 1,750 shp (1,300 kW)
- Propulsion: 1 × propeller
- Speed: 11.5 kn (21.3 km/h; 13.2 mph)
- Capacity: 3,945 t (3,883 long tons) DWT; 9,830 cu ft (278 m^{3}) (refrigerated); 227,730 cu ft (6,449 m^{3}) (non-refrigerated)
- Complement: 15 Officers; 70 Enlisted
- Armament: 1 × 3 in (76 mm)/50 caliber dual purpose gun (DP); 6 × 20 mm (0.8 in) Oerlikon anti-aircraft (AA) cannons

USS Lehigh (AK-192) was an Alamosa class cargo ship that was constructed by the United States Navy during the closing period of World War II. She was declared excess-to-needs and returned to the United States Maritime Commission shortly after commissioning.

== Construction ==
The second ship to be so named by the Navy, Lehigh was laid down under a Maritime Commission contract, MC hull 2123, by Walter Butler Shipbuilding Co., Superior, Wisconsin, 8 June 1944; launched 25 November 1944; sponsored by Mrs. Stanley Butler; acquired by the Navy 30 July 1945; placed in service the same day for ferrying from Beaumont, Texas, to Galveston, Texas; placed out of service on the 31st; and commissioned at New Orleans 13 September 1945.

== Post-war decommissioning ==
Because of the reduced need for cargo ships following World War II, Lehigh decommissioned 6 November 1945 and was turned over to the War Shipping Administration (WSA) the same day, and her name was reverted to Coastal Expounder.

== Merchant service ==
Coastal Expounder was used by several shipping companies from 1945 to 1947, when she was placed in the reserve fleet before being transferred then sold to Lloyd Brasileiro, Patrimônio Nicional, of Brazil.

On 7 March 1947, she was sold for $693,862 and renamed Rio Solimões. She was scrapped in 1969.

== Notes ==
Citations

== Bibliography ==
Online resources

- "Lehigh II (AK-192)". Dictionary of American Naval Fighting Ships. Naval History and Heritage Command. 29 July 2015. This article incorporates text from this source, which is in the public domain.
- "C1 Cargo Ships". www.ShipbuildingHistory.com. 28 August 2009.
- "USS Lehigh (AK-192)". NavSource. 8 November 2013.
- "Coastal Expounder". United States Department of Transportation. Archived from the original on November 4, 2016.
