= SS Luther Martin =

Liberty ship of WWII

History

United States
- Name: Luther Martin
- Namesake: Luther Martin
- Owner: War Shipping Administration (WSA)
- Operator: Agwilines Inc.
- Ordered: as type (EC2-S-C1) hull, MCE hull 49
- Awarded: 14 March 1941
- Builder: Bethlehem-Fairfield Shipyard, Baltimore, Maryland
- Cost: $1,072,020
- Yard number: 2036
- Way number: 8
- Laid down: 8 May 1942
- Launched: 4 July 1942
- Sponsored by: Mrs. Charles A. Swartz
- Completed: 21 July 1942
- Identification: Call sign: KGBH
- Fate: Laid up in the National Defense Reserve Fleet, Wilmington, North Carolina, 4 June 1948; Laid up in the National Defense Reserve Fleet, Mobile, Alabama, 15 May 1952; Sold for scrapping, 7 October 1971, withdrawn from fleet, 27 October 1971

General characteristics
- Class & type: Liberty ship; type EC2-S-C1, standard
- Tonnage: 10,865 LT DWT; 7,176 GRT
- Displacement: 3,380 long tons (3,434 t) (light); 14,245 long tons (14,474 t) (max)
- Length: 441 feet 6 inches (135 m) oa; 416 feet (127 m) pp; 427 feet (130 m) lwl
- Beam: 57 feet (17 m)
- Draft: 27 ft 9.25 in (8.4646 m)
- Installed power: 2 × Oil fired 450 °F (232 °C) boilers, operating at 220 psi (1,500 kPa); 2,500 hp (1,900 kW)
- Propulsion: 1 × triple-expansion steam engine, (manufactured by Worthington Pump & Machinery Corp, Harrison, New Jersey); 1 × screw propeller
- Speed: 11.5 knots (21.3 km/h; 13.2 mph)
- Capacity: 562,608 cubic feet (15,931 m^{3}) (grain); 499,573 cubic feet (14,146 m^{3}) (bale)
- Complement: 38–62 USMM; 21–40 USNAG
- Armament: Varied by ship; Bow-mounted 3-inch (76 mm)/50-caliber gun; Stern-mounted 4-inch (102 mm)/50-caliber gun; 2–8 × single 20-millimeter (0.79 in) Oerlikon anti-aircraft (AA) cannons and/or, 2–8 × 37-millimeter (1.46 in) M1 AA guns

SS Luther Martin was a Liberty ship built in the United States during World War II. She was named after Luther Martin, a politician and one of the Founding Fathers of the United States, who left the Constitutional Convention early because he felt the Constitution violated States' rights. He was a leading Anti-Federalist, along with Patrick Henry and George Mason, whose actions helped passage of the Bill of Rights.

== Construction ==
Luther Martin was laid down on 8 May 1942, under a Maritime Commission (MARCOM) contract, MCE hull 49, by the Bethlehem-Fairfield Shipyard, Baltimore, Maryland; sponsored by Mrs. Charles A. Swartz, the wife of the B & O Railroad Car inspector at Bethlehem-Fairfield Shipyard, and was launched on 4 July 1942.

== History ==
She was allocated to Agwilines Inc., on 21 July 1942. On 4 June 1948, she was laid up in the National Defense Reserve Fleet, Wilmington, North Carolina. On 15 May 1952, she was laid up in the National Defense Reserve Fleet, Mobile, Alabama. She was sold for scrapping on 7 October 1971, to Union Minerals & Alloys Corp., for $33,127.54. She was withdrawn from the fleet on 27 October 1971.

== Bibliography ==
- "Bethlehem-Fairfield, Baltimore MD". www.ShipbuildingHistory.com. 14 August 2008.
- Maritime Administration. "Luther Martin". Ship History Database Vessel Status Card. U.S. Department of Transportation, Maritime Administration.
- Davies, James (May 2004). "Specifications (As-Built)" (PDF). p. 23.
- "SS Luther Martin".
