= SS George Wythe =

Liberty ship of WWII

History

United States
- Name: George Wythe
- Namesake: George Wythe
- Owner: War Shipping Administration (WSA)
- Operator: Agwilines Inc.
- Ordered: as type (EC2-S-C1) hull, MCE hull 24
- Awarded: 14 March 1941
- Builder: Bethlehem-Fairfield Shipyard, Baltimore, Maryland
- Cost: $1,236,111
- Yard number: 2011
- Way number: 11
- Laid down: 22 September 1941
- Launched: 28 March 1942
- Sponsored by: Miss Geanne A. Culleton
- Completed: 9 May 1942
- Identification: Call sign: KESU
- Fate: Sold for scrapping, 24 July 1970

General characteristics
- Class & type: Liberty ship; type EC2-S-C1, standard
- Tonnage: 10,865 LT DWT; 7,176 GRT
- Displacement: 3,380 long tons (3,434 t) (light); 14,245 long tons (14,474 t) (max)
- Length: 441 feet 6 inches (135 m) oa; 416 feet (127 m) pp; 427 feet (130 m) lwl
- Beam: 57 feet (17 m)
- Draft: 27 ft 9.25 in (8.4646 m)
- Installed power: 2 × Oil fired 450 °F (232 °C) boilers, operating at 220 psi (1,500 kPa); 2,500 hp (1,900 kW)
- Propulsion: 1 × triple-expansion steam engine, (manufactured by Worthington Pump & Machinery Corp, Harrison, New Jersey); 1 × screw propeller
- Speed: 11.5 knots (21.3 km/h; 13.2 mph)
- Capacity: 562,608 cubic feet (15,931 m^{3}) (grain); 499,573 cubic feet (14,146 m^{3}) (bale)
- Complement: 38–62 USMM; 21–40 USNAG
- Armament: Varied by ship; Bow-mounted 3-inch (76 mm)/50-caliber gun; Stern-mounted 4-inch (102 mm)/50-caliber gun; 2–8 × single 20-millimeter (0.79 in) Oerlikon anti-aircraft (AA) cannons and/or, 2–8 × 37-millimeter (1.46 in) M1 AA guns

SS George Wythe was a Liberty ship built in the United States during World War II. She was named after Founding Father George Wythe, the first American law professor, a noted classics scholar, and a Virginia judge. The first of the seven Virginia signatories of the United States Declaration of Independence, Wythe served as one of Virginia's representatives to the Second Continental Congress and the Philadelphia Convention. Wythe taught and was a mentor to Thomas Jefferson, John Marshall, Henry Clay and other men who became American leaders.

== Construction ==
George Wythe was laid down on 22 September 1941, under a Maritime Commission (MARCOM) contract, MCE hull 24, by the Bethlehem-Fairfield Shipyard, Baltimore, Maryland; sponsored by Miss Geanne A. Culleton, the daughter of C.J. Culleton, the resident plant auditor at the Bethlehem-Fairfield Shipyard, and was launched on 28 March 1942.

== History ==
George Wythe was allocated to Agwilines Inc., on 9 May 1942. On 8 January 1948, she was laid up in the Hudson River Reserve Fleet, Jones Point, New York. On 21 April 1952, she was laid up in the James River Reserve Fleet, Lee Hall, Virginia. On 7 August 1953, George Wythe was withdrawn from the fleet to be loaded with grain under the "Grain Program 1953", she returned loaded on 22 August 1953. On 13 February 1956, she was withdrawn to be unload, she returned empty 29 February 1956. On 7 November 1958, George Wythe was withdrawn from the fleet to be loaded with grain under the "Grain Program 1958", she returned loaded on 21 November 1958. On 7 March 1959, she was withdrawn to be unload, she returned empty 19 March 1959. She was sold for scrapping on 24 July 1970, to Hierros Ardes, SA, for $102,666. George Wythe was removed from the fleet, 31 August 1970.

== Bibliography ==
- "Bethlehem-Fairfield, Baltimore MD". www.ShipbuildingHistory.com. 14 August 2008.
- Maritime Administration. "George Wythe". Ship History Database Vessel Status Card. U.S. Department of Transportation, Maritime Administration.
- Davies, James (May 2004). "Specifications (As-Built)" (PDF). p. 23.
- "SS George Wythe".
