= SS Bucknell Victory =

Victory ship of the United States

- Typical Victory Ship.

History

United States
- Name: Bucknell Victory
- Namesake: Bucknell University in Pennsylvania
- Owner: War Shipping Administration
- Operator: Agwilines Inc
- Builder: Permanente Metals, plant No. 2
- Laid down: December 27, 1944
- Launched: February 10, 1945
- Completed: March 7, 1945
- Identification: IMO number: 5054616
- Fate: Scrapped 1994

General characteristics
- Class & type: VC2-S-AP3 Victory ship
- Tonnage: 7,612 GRT, 4,553 NRT
- Displacement: 15,200 tons
- Length: 455 ft (139 m)
- Beam: 62 ft (19 m)
- Draught: 28 ft (8.5 m)
- Installed power: 8,500 shp (6,300 kW)
- Propulsion: HP & LP turbines geared to a single 20.5-foot (6.2 m) propeller
- Speed: 16.5 knots (30.6 km/h; 19.0 mph)
- Boats & landing craft carried: 4 lifeboats
- Complement: 62 Merchant Marine and 28 US Naval Armed Guards
- Armament: 1 × 5-inch (127 mm)/38 caliber gun; 1 × 3-inch (76 mm)/50 caliber gun; 8 × 20 mm Oerlikon

SS Bucknell Victory was a Victory-class cargo ship built during World War II. The Bucknell Victory was a type VC2-S-AP2 victory ship built by Permanente Metals Corporation, Yard 2, of Richmond, California. The Maritime Administration cargo ship was the 728th ship built. Her keel was laid on December 27, 1944. SS Bucknell Victory was an armed cargo ship, named for Bucknell University in Pennsylvania, one of 150 educational institutions that had Victory ships named after them. She was built in just 70 days, under the Emergency Shipbuilding program for World War II. The 10,600-ton ship was constructed for the Maritime Commission.

Victory ships were designed to replace the earlier Liberty ships. Liberty ships were designed to be used just for World War II. Victory ships were designed to last longer and serve the US Navy after the war. The Victory ship differed from a Liberty ship in that they were: faster, longer and wider, taller, a thinner stack set farther toward the superstructure and had a long raised forecastle.

== World War II ==
For World War II the Bucknell Victory was operated by the Agwilines Inc under the United States Merchant Marine act for the War Shipping Administration. She had United States Navy Armed Guard to man the deck guns. She took cargo to support troops in the Pacific War. The goods were for the Battle of Okinawa operations, that lasted from 1 April until 22 June 1945. On 9 May 1945 at Okinawa a Kamikaze plane hit her causing damage. The attack took out her power, so the tug USS Pakana (ATF-108) came alongside the Bucknell Victory to supply power to the ship and help her until May 18. She was repaired and put back in service.

== War Relief and Seacowboys ==
In 1946 after World War II the Bucknell Victory was converted to a livestock ship, also called a cowboy ship. From 1945 to 1947 the United Nations Relief and Rehabilitation Administration and the Brethren Service Committee of the Church of the Brethren sent livestock to war-torn countries. These "seagoing cowboys" made about 360 trips on 73 different ships. The Heifers for Relief project was started by the Church of the Brethren in 1942; in 1953 this became Heifer International. The SS Bucknell Victory was one of these ships, known as cowboy ships, as she moved livestock across the Atlantic Ocean. The Bucknell Victory made five trip and she took 780 horses, several thousand baby chicks and hay bales to Poland on each trip. Bucknell Victory moved horses, heifers, and mules as well as some chicks, rabbits, and goats. In 1947 with her war and relief work done she was laid up in the James River as part of the National Defense Reserve Fleet. In 1950 a new war was starting in the Far East so she was removed from the Reserve Fleet.

== Korean War ==
SS Bucknell Victory served as merchant marine ship supplying goods for the Korean War. About 75 percent of the personnel taking to Korea for the Korean War came by the merchant marine ship. SS Bucknell Victory transported goods, mail, food and other supplies. About 90 percent of the cargo was moved by merchant marine naval to the war zone. SS Bucknell Victory made trips between 1950 and 1952, helping American forces engaged against Communist aggression in South Korea. In 1952 she was returned to the National Defense Reserve Fleet.

== Vietnam War ==
In 1966 she was removed from the National Defense Reserve Fleet again and reactivated for the Vietnam War. She was operated by the American President Lines. After the war, in 1973 she was laid up at Suisun Bay in the National Defense Reserve Fleet. In 1994 she was scrapped in China.

== Honors ==
Bucknell Victory earned Battle Stars for using her deck guns to defend herself and other ships from 3 May 1945 to 22 May 1945 during the assault of Okinawa.

== See also ==
- List of Victory ships
- Liberty ship
- Type C1 ship
- Type C2 ship
- Type C3 ship

== Sources ==
- Sawyer, L.A. and W.H. Mitchell. Victory ships and tankers: The history of the ‘Victory’ type cargo ships and of the tankers built in the United States of America during World War II, Cornell Maritime Press, 1974, 0-87033-182-5.
- United States Maritime Commission:
- Victory Cargo Ships
