= Kiowa, Nebraska =

Ghost town in Thayer County, Nebraska, United States

Kiowa is a ghost town in Thayer County, Nebraska, United States.

== History ==
A post office was established at Kiowa in 1873, and remained in operation until it was discontinued in 1903. The community was named after the Kiowa Indians.
