= USS Skink =

Patrol vessel of the United States Navy

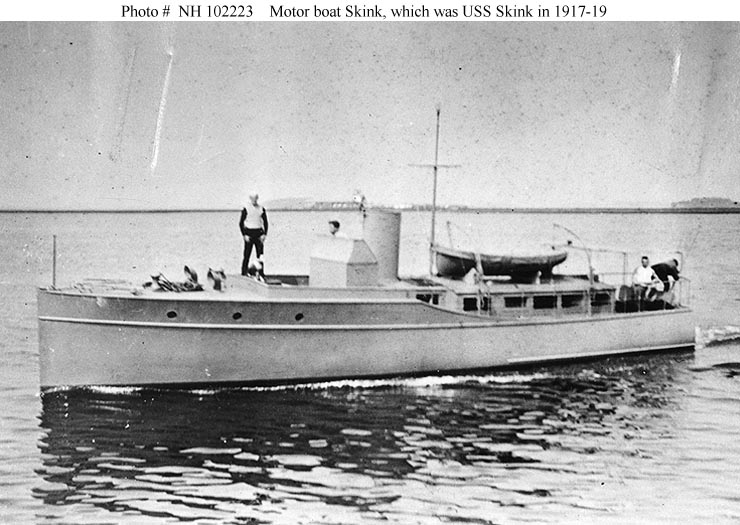
- Skink as a private motorboat in 1917 shortly before the U.S. Navy acquired her.

History

United States
- Name: USS Skink
- Namesake: Previous name retained
- Builder: George Lawley & Son, Neponset, Massachusetts
- Completed: 1917
- Acquired: 30 June 1917
- Commissioned: 13 June 1917
- Decommissioned: 22 November 1918
- Fate: Returned to owner 24 February 1919
- Notes: Operated as private motorboat Skink in 1917 and from 1919

General characteristics
- Type: Patrol vessel
- Tonnage: 10 gross register tons
- Length: 50 ft (15 m)
- Beam: 10 ft 6 in (3.20 m)
- Draft: 6 ft (1.8 m)
- Speed: 17 knots
- Complement: 7
- Armament: 1 × machine gun

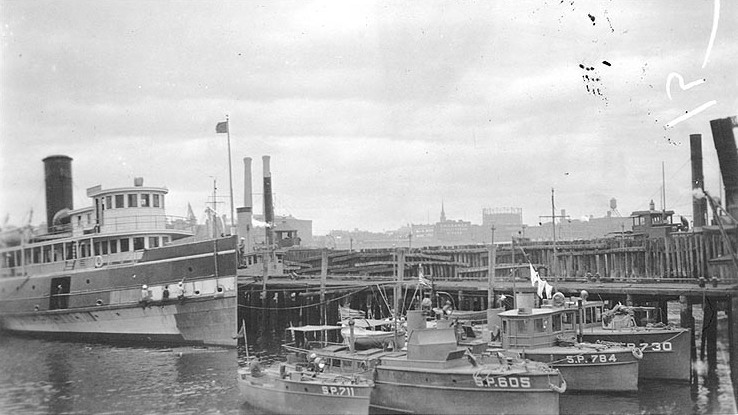
U.S. Navy patrol vessels at Lockwood's Basin in Boston, Massachusetts, ca. 1918. Starting from the bottom center, from left to right they are USS Kiowa (SP-711), USS Skink (SP-605), USS Whistler (SP-784), and USS Lynx II (SP-730). The passenger and cargo ship USS Moosehead (ID-2047) is at left.

USS Skink (SP-605) was a United States Navy patrol vessel in commission from 1917 to 1918.

Skink was built as a private motorboat of the same name by George Lawley & Son at Neponset, Massachusetts, in 1917. In 1917, the U.S. Navy acquired her from her owner, Robert D. Longyear of Cambridge, Massachusetts, for use as a section patrol boat during World War I. She was commissioned as USS Skink (SP-605) on 13 June 1917, and retrospectively formally acquired from Longyear on 30 June 1917.

Assigned to the 1st Naval District in northern New England, Skink carried out patrol duties in the Boston, Massachusetts, area for the rest of World War I.

Skink was decommissioned on 22 November 1918 and returned to Longyear on 24 February 1919.
