= USS Badger (1889) =

Auxiliary cruiser of the US Navy

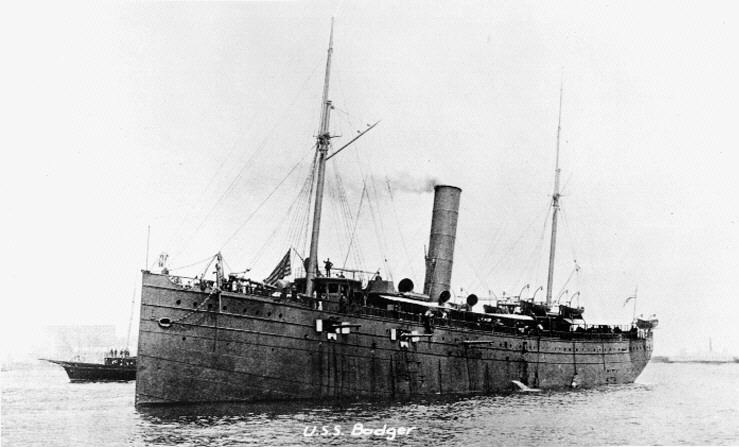
- USS Badger in 1898

History

United States
- Name: Badger (1898–1900); Lawton
- Builder: Delaware River Iron Ship Building and Engine Works, Chester, Pennsylvania
- Laid down: 1889
- Launched: 1889
- Acquired: by purchase, 19 April 1898
- Commissioned: 25 April 1898
- Decommissioned: 31 October 1899
- Fate: Transferred to War Department, 7 April 1900, U.S. Army Transport Lawton

General characteristics
- Type: Auxiliary cruiser
- Displacement: 4,784 long tons (4,861 t)
- Length: 329 ft 6 in (100.43 m)
- Beam: 48 ft 3 in (14.71 m)
- Draft: 18 ft 5 in (5.61 m)
- Speed: 16 knots (30 km/h; 18 mph)
- Complement: 235 officers and men
- Armament: 6 × 5 in (130 mm) guns; 6 × 6-pounder guns

USS Badger was an auxiliary cruiser of the United States Navy, the first U.S. Navy ship named after the burrowing mammal. Badger was sold to the War Department in April 1900 to serve as the U.S. Army Transport Lawton.

She was built in 1889 by Delaware River Iron Ship Building and Engine Works, Chester, Pennsylvania, as merchant ship Yumuri, purchased for use in the Spanish–American War on 19 April 1898 and converted to an auxiliary cruiser at New York Navy Yard, then commissioned on 25 April 1898, Commander A. S. Snow in command; and joined the North Patrol Squadron.

== Service history ==
From 1 July to 18 August 1898, Badger served on the blockade of Cuba. On 26 July 1898, off the Dry Tortugas, she seized a Spanish tug with two vessels in tow, each with a quarantine flag hoisted. They were given medical assistance, provisioned, and kept in port until 3 August when a prize crew was put aboard the tug to sail her to New York. The other two vessels with 399 prisoners of war were sent to Havana.

Badger left Guantánamo Bay on 18 August 1898 with a contingent of Army troops, landing them at Montauk Point, New York, 24 August. Badger remained on the east coast until 26 December 1898 when she sailed to the Pacific, arriving at San Francisco 15 April 1899. From there she carried the Joint High Commission to Samoa (26 April – 13 May 1899) and then cruised in Samoan waters. Following her return to Mare Island Navy Yard on 14 August 1899, she cruised along the Pacific coast until 6 October 1899 with the Oregon and California Naval Militia. Decommissioned on 31 October 1899, Badger was transferred to the War Department on 7 April 1900, where she was renamed Lawton and used as an army transport.

USAT Lawton At Seattle, Washington, 5 June 1900 preparing for a voyage to Cape Nome, Alaska.

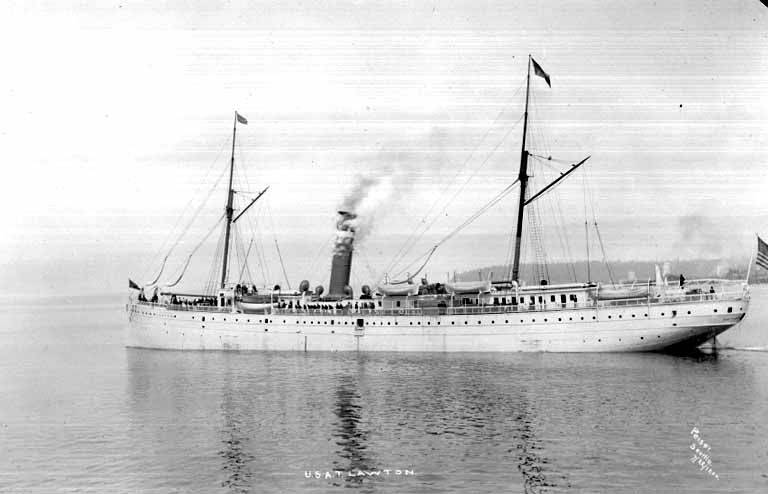
USAT Lawton transporting U.S. troops out of Seattle en route to China, 22 July 1900.

USAT Lawton, 3,497 GRT, was fitted for troop and supply service to Alaska with a capacity for 700 passengers. In June 1900 the ship was engaged in returning destitute citizens from Alaska to the United States. Over the next fiscal year (1 July 1900 – 30 June 1901) Lawton was also engaged in transport to China and interisland service in the Philippines. The ship transported troops to China in July 1900 in response to the Boxer Rebellion.
