= SS Lake Elsmere =

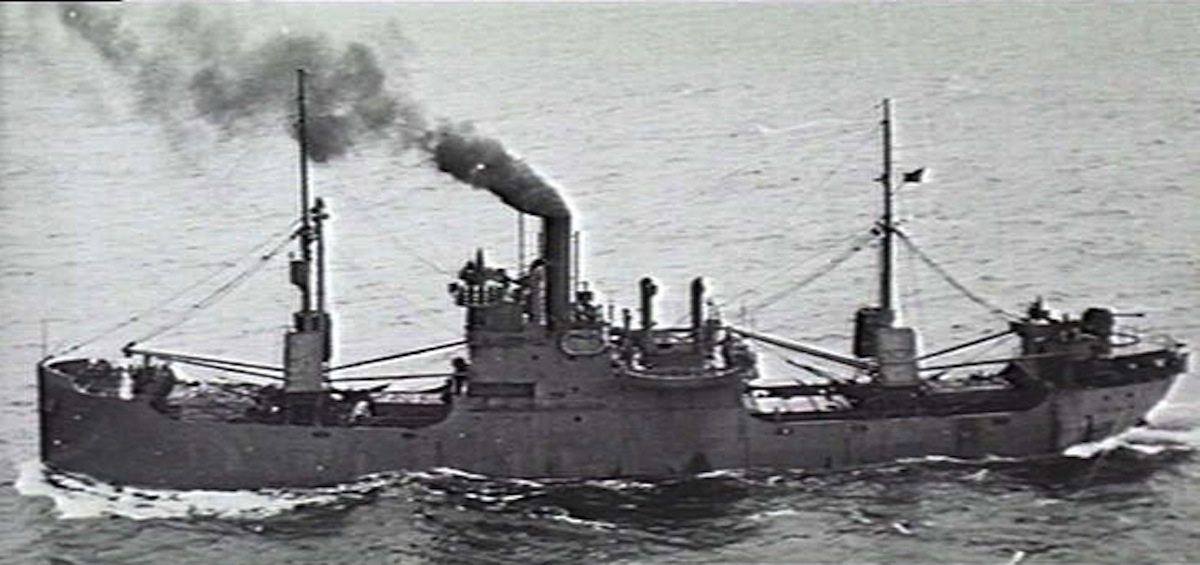
- Aerial port side view of the American cargo steamer City of Philadelphia. (Australian War Memorial)

History
- Name: Lake Elsmere (1919—1923); City of Philadelphia (1923—1946); Hai Cheh (1946—1950); Ho Ping Pa Hao (1950—1960); Hoping No. 8 (1960—1967)
- Owner: USSB (1919—1923); Southern Steamship Co. (1923—1946); China Merchants Steam Navigation Co. (1946—1950); Republic of China (1950—1967)
- Operator: USSB (1919—1923); Southern Steamship Co. (1923—1942); War Shipping Administration (AGWILINES agent) (1942-1943); U.S. Army (1943-1946); China Merchants Steam Navigation Co. (1946—1950); China People’s Steam Navigation Co. (1950—1967)
- Builder: Great Lakes Engineering Works, Ashtabula, Ohio
- Yard number: 513
- Launched: 3 November 1919
- Completed: November 1919
- Identification: U.S. Official Number: 219256; Signal: LTRW
- Fate: Deleted 1969
- Notes: Wartime SWPA permanent local fleet identification number: X-104

General characteristics
- Type: EFC Design 1074 ship
- Tonnage: 2,674 GRT, 1,663 NRT, 4,050 DWT; 2,606 GRT, 1,432 NRT (1950 rebuild)
- Length: 253.4 ft (77.2 m) registry length
- Beam: 43.7 ft (13.3 m)
- Depth: 26.2 ft (8.0 m)
- Installed power: Oil fired steam boilers
- Propulsion: Triple expansion engines, 1,500 ihp
- Notes: Australian War Memorial photo caption notes armament of USAT City of Philadelphia as one 3 inch gun and four 20 mm Oerlikon AA guns.

SS Lake Elsmere was an Emergency Fleet Corporation (EFC) Design 1074 cargo ship built for the United States Shipping Board (USSB) during the massive shipbuilding effort of World War I.

The USSB operated the ship until sold in 1923 to the Southern Steamship Company for operation between Philadelphia and Houston as City of Philadelphia. In June 1942 the ship was delivered to the War Shipping Administration (WSA) for wartime operation first allocated to the U.S. Army with the WSA operator being Atlantic Gulf and West Indies Lines (AGWILINES), the parent company of Southern Steamship. On 27 May 1943 WSA obtained the vessel under bareboat charter with Army operating the ship under sub-bareboat charter. As USAT City of Philadelphia the ship arrived in Australia to remain the rest of the war in the U.S. Army Services of Supply permanent local fleet with the fleet designation X-104. WSA delivered the ship to the owners at Shanghai in December 1945 where the ship was sold to the China Merchants Steam Navigation Company and renamed Hai Cheh. Later sold to the Republic of China the ship was named Ho Ping Pa Hao 1950 to 1960 and Hoping No. 8 1960 until 1967 when the ship dropped out of registers.

== Construction ==
Lake Elsmere, hull 513, was one of eight Design 1074 ships built by Great Lakes Engineering Works at its Ashtabula, Ohio yard, launched 3 November 1919 with completion later that month. A total of fifty-two Design 1074, "Great Lakes Engineering type," were built in among a larger group of ships built for the USSB on the Great Lakes known as the "Laker" type.

The ship was registered with U.S. Official Number 219256, signal LTRW, at Cleveland, Ohio as 2,674 GRT, 1,663 NRT, 253.4 ft (77.2 m) registry length, 43.7 ft (13.3 m) beam, 26.2 ft (8.0 m) depth, 1,500 indicated horsepower and a crew of 35. In 1950 rebuilds resulted in a tonnage change to 2,606 GRT, 1,432 NRT. The ship disappeared from registry in 1967.

== U.S. Operation ==
The USSB operated Lake Elsmere from delivery in November 1919 until sold in an offer accepted 10 April 1923 of the Southern Steamship Company, a wholly owned subsidiary of Atlantic Gulf and West Indies Lines (AGWILINES), for $75,000. The ship was renamed City of Philadelphia, registered at Philadelphia, operating in freight service between Philadelphia and Houston, Texas.

On 6 June 1942 the ship was delivered to the War Shipping Administration (WSA) at New Orleans for wartime operation under an Army charter agreement with AGWILINES as the WSA operating agent. That changed to a sub-bareboat charter by the Army from WSA on 27 May 1943 in New York with the ship operating as USAT City of Philadelphia. (Note: The designation as a formal United States Army Transport (USAT) was conferred on ships owned or bareboat chartered and operated by the Army.)

City of Philadelphia was among the vessels meeting transportation requirements in the South West Pacific Area (SWPA). Operations in undeveloped ports and shallow waters of northern Australia and the islands to the north resulted in a request by the South West Pacific Area Services of Supply for at least twenty additional vessels (Note: The core of the SWPA fleet was composed of twenty-one refugee ships from the Dutch East Indies island trading Koninklijke Paketvaart-Maatschappij fleet. They were suited for the relatively shallow and undeveloped ports in northern Australia and the islands to the north.) for the command's permanent local fleet having moderate draft and capacity of between 4,000 DWT and 6,000 DWT with large hatches and at least one boom rated for 25 ton lift. The vessels were to be capable of troop transport without significant loss of cargo capacity. Such vessels were typically in coastwise trade in the United States and the size limitation of passage from the Great Lakes to the coasts meant that many were built on the Great Lakes with them often being termed "Lakers" or "Lake type vessels". Such vessels were allocated to meet the SWPA requirement with City of Philadelphia, arriving 12 November 1943 and given the SWPA fleet identification X-104, being one of 29 sent by 11 February 1844. The ship was classed among the 8.5 kn (9.8 mph; 15.7 km/h) vessels and among the ten altered to transport refrigerated cargo.

After the war WSA redelivered City of Philadelphia to the owners at Shanghai on 29 December 1945 who, with United States Maritime Commission approval sold the ship for $158,973.89 to China on 4 January 1946.

== China service ==
Renamed Hai Cheh the ship operated for China Merchants Steam Navigation Company until transferred to the Republic of China in 1949. From 1950 the ship was operated by China People's Steam Navigation Co., Shanghai as Ho Ping Pa Hao 1950—1960 and Hoping No. 8 1960—1967 when the ship dropped out of registers in 1969.
