= USS Whistler =

Patrol vessel of the United States Navy

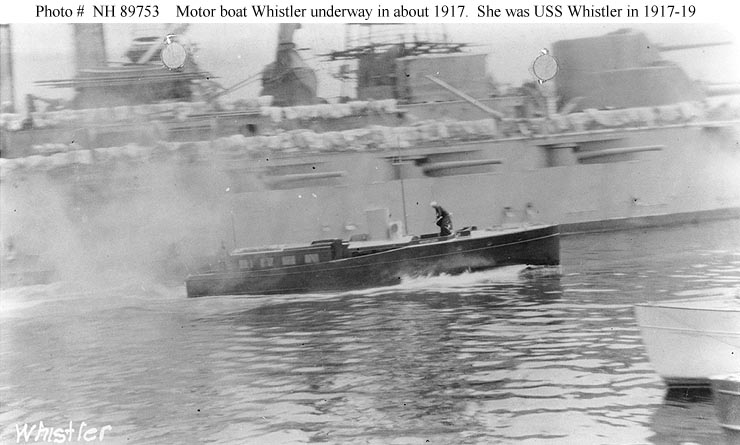
- Whistler passing a Virginia-class battleship around the time of her acquisition by the U.S. Navy in May 1917.

History

United States
- Name: USS Whistler
- Namesake: Previous name retained
- Builder: J. E. Graves, Marblehead, Massachusetts
- Completed: 1917
- Acquired: 17 May 1917
- Commissioned: 31 July 1917
- Decommissioned: 19 May 1919
- Stricken: 19 May 1919
- Fate: Sold 20 June 1919
- Notes: Operated as private motorboat Whistler in 1917

General characteristics
- Type: Patrol vessel
- Tonnage: 20 gross register tons
- Length: 50 ft (15 m)
- Beam: 11 ft 6 in (3.51 m)
- Draft: 3 ft (0.91 m) mean
- Speed: 25 knots
- Complement: 7
- Armament: 1 × 1-pounder gun; 1 × Colt machine gun

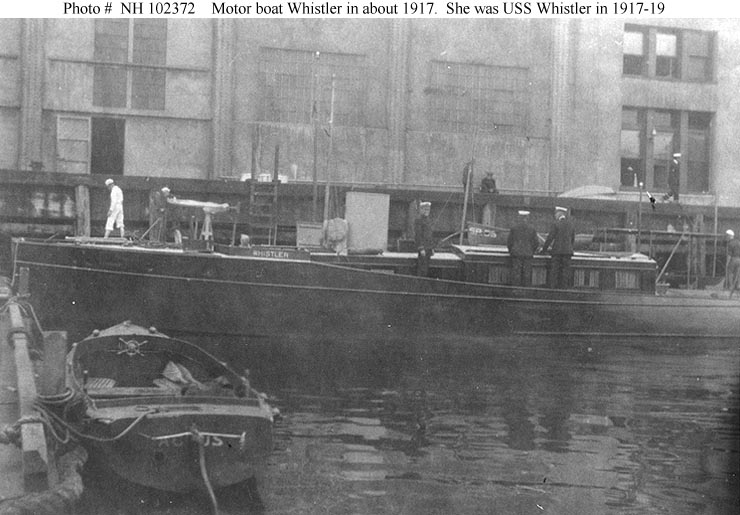
Whistler around the time of her acquisition by the U.S. Navy in May 1917.

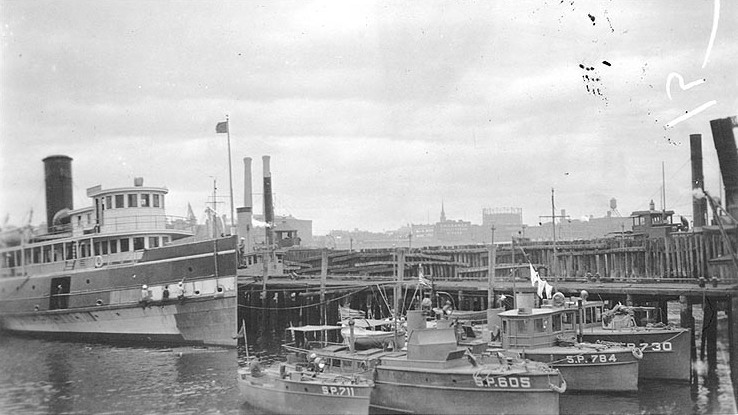
U.S. Navy patrol vessels at Lockwood's Basin in Boston, Massachusetts, ca. 1918. Starting from the bottom center, from left to right they are USS Kiowa (SP-711, USS Skink (SP-605), USS Whistler (SP-784), and USS Lynx II (SP-730). The passenger and cargo ship USS Moosehead (ID-2047) is at left.

USS Whistler (SP-784) was a United States Navy patrol vessel in commission from 1917 to 1919.

Whistler was built as a private motorboat of the same name by J. E. Graves at Marblehead, Massachusetts, in 1917. On 17 May 1917, the U.S. Navy acquired her from her owner, Lawrence F. Percival of Boston, Massachusetts, for use as a section patrol boat during World War I. She was commissioned as USS Whistler (SP-784) on 31 July 1917.

Assigned to the Boston Section of the 1st Naval District, Whistler operated from the naval district's headquarters at the Commonwealth Pier in Boston on harbor entrance patrols for the rest of World War I. She occasionally served as a dispatch boat, carrying messages to and from other boats patrolling the harbor entrance. She also stood by the new submarine USS O-5 (Submarine No. 66) while O-5 conducted pre-commissioning submergence and sea trials on 30 May 1918.

Whistler was decommissioned on 19 May 1919 and stricken from the Navy List the same day. She was sold to J. E. Doherty of Boston on 20 June 1919.
