= SS Chippewa (1905) =

Former American cargo ship (1905–1928)

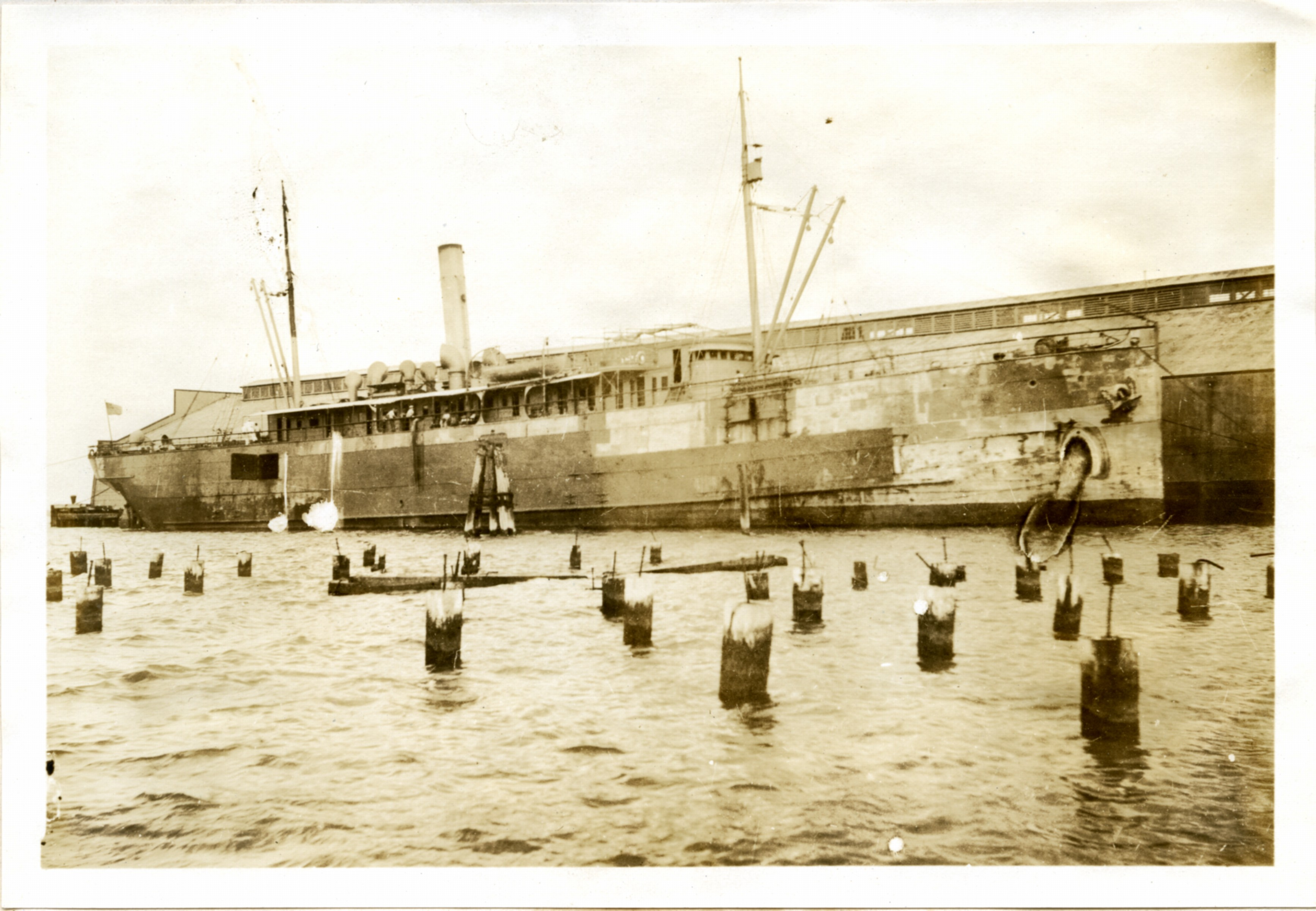

History

United States
- Name: Chippewa
- Namesake: Chippewa
- Owner: Clyde Steamship Co.
- Builder: William Cramp & Sons, Philadelphia
- Yard number: 330
- Launched: 8 April 1905
- Sponsored by: Mrs. Harry W. Hand
- Commissioned: 20 May 1905
- Maiden voyage: 24 May 1905
- Home port: New York
- Identification: US Official Number 201920; Call sign KTSQ
- Fate: Scrapped, October 1928

General characteristics
- Type: Cargo ship
- Tonnage: 2,696 GRT; 2,155 NRT
- Length: 275 ft 9 in (84.05 m)
- Beam: 40 ft 1 in (12.22 m)
- Depth: 19 ft 5 in (5.92 m)
- Installed power: 131 Nhp
- Propulsion: William Cramp & Sons 3-cylinder triple expansion
- Speed: 12.0 knots (13.8 mph; 22.2 km/h)

Chippewa was a steam cargo ship built in 1905 by William Cramp & Sons of Philadelphia for Clyde Steamship Company with intention of operating on their East Coast and West Indies routes.

== Design and construction ==
In 1904 Clyde Steamship & Co. following an increase in their freight business placed an order for two steamers of approximately 2,700 GRT to serve on their East coast route between Boston and southern ports. Chippewa was the first of these ships, and was laid down at the William Cramp & Sons' Kensington Yard in Philadelphia (yard number 330) and launched on 8 April 1905, with Mrs. Harry W. Hand, wife of the general manager of Cramp Shipbuilding Company being the sponsor. The ship was of the three-deck type, and had all the modern machinery fitted for quick loading and unloading of the cargo, including a large number of derricks.

Following an inspection on May 4 and the successful completion of sea trials, the steamer was transferred to her owners and departed for New York on May 20.

As built, the ship was 275 feet 9 inches (84.05 m) long (between perpendiculars) and 40 feet 1 inch (12.22 m) abeam, a depth of 19 feet 5 inches (5.92 m). Chippewa was assessed at 2,696 GRT and 2,155 NRT and had deadweight of approximately 4,000. The vessel had a steel hull, and a single 131 nhp triple-expansion steam engine, with cylinders of 18-inch (46 cm), 30-inch (76 cm) and 49-inch (120 cm) diameter with a 30-inch (76 cm) stroke, that drove a single screw propeller, and moved the ship at up to 12.0 knots (13.8 mph; 22.2 km/h).

== Operational history ==
Upon delivery Chippewa sailed from Philadelphia for New York on May 20, 1905. After loading, she departed on her maiden voyage on May 24, arriving at Charleston on May 27. The vessel then continued down to Jacksonville to take on more cargo, and left it on May 30 for her return trip. After stops at Brunswick and Charleston, she arrived at Boston on June 5, thus ending her maiden voyage.

Chippewa continued serving the same route for the rest of her career, connecting Charleston, Brunswick and Jacksonville with Boston, with occasional stops at Georgetown and Baltimore. The steamer carried a variety of general cargo from the southern ports, mostly lumber, cotton, naval stores and fruit. For example, on January 19, 1907 the ship brought to Boston over 1,200 bales of cotton, nearly 450,000 feet of yellow pine lumber, 2,500 barrels of rosin in addition to other general cargo.

On May 30, 1906 while sailing from Jacksonville to Boston, Chippewa encountered schooner Edward P. Avery about forty miles off Winter Quarter Shoal, floating helplessly with both of her main and mizzenmast broken after she was run down by another schooner, George May. Chippewa took Edward P. Avery in tow and brought her into New York harbor on June 1. Chippewa again came to the rescue, when she picked up six men crew of schooner J.W. Balano, wrecked about forty miles off Frying Pan lightship, and safely brought them to Boston on September 21, 1906.

On March 3, 1908 the steamer arrived at Jacksonville, and after loading sailed for her return trip to Boston. Shortly after leaving the port, Chippewa lost her propeller and tail-shaft and had to be towed back into port by her sister-ship Onondaga. She was towed from Jacksonville by another Clyde steamer, Apache, on March 10 but only went as far as Brunswick due to Apache being heavily laden. Chippewa was instead taken in tow by steamer Katahdin, also of Clyde Line, which called at Brunswick on her way up north, and brought her to New York for repairs on March 18. After finalizing her repairs the vessel arrived at Boston on April 3 to resume her regular service.

=== 1908 Grounding ===
Chippewa left Jacksonville on her usual trip on June 19, bound for Boston. She called at Charleston on June 21 and continued sailing north. She was under command of captain Barksdale MacBeth and had a crew of 28 men and carried a cargo of lumber, naval stores and watermelons in addition to some livestock. At around 20:30 on June 23 the ship passed the Shinnecock Light and the soundings were taken indicating depth of about 18 fathoms. The weather was clear the whole trip until about 23:30 when the vessel entered thick fog. At around 23:50 while maintaining her course thought to be paralleling the Long Island's south coast, Chippewa ran aground about three miles west off Montauk Point Lighthouse, and about half a mile east of the Ditch Plains Life Saving Station. As the steamer went ashore she hit a submerged rock making a hole in her bottom. The water rushed in extinguishing her engines which made the vessel helpless. The crew had to wait until the fog lifted before going on shore to request help. Two wrecking tugs were dispatched to their aid, but they could not dislodge the steamer. It became apparent that the only way the ship could be refloated if most of her cargo is removed, and the work commenced almost immediately on lighting the vessel. Some cargo was brought to ports, but the rest, like 60,000 watermelons had to be thrown overboard to the delight of local residents.

The lightening work continued uninterrupted until mid-July when most of the cargo was discharged from the ship and an attempt to refloat the steamer was scheduled for July 18. However, the weather which up to this point was very fine, suddenly changed for the worse in the morning of July 18. By noon Chippewa had waves washing over her destroying the temporary accommodations of the captain and the crew that were still aboard the vessel making them to take to the rigging. Their call for help was answered by the head of the local Lifesaving Station and a crew of boarders from a nearby inn. They managed to put a 1,400 feet long line between the ship and the cliffs allowing all the crew to safely reach the shore as the storm raged.

Finally, after several more delays due to storms passing through the area, Chippewa was finally refloated on August 4 and towed to New York for repairs. It took a little over a month to finalize the repairs, and the steamer arrived at Boston on September 28 to resume sailing on her regular route. An inquiry was held into grounding in late September 1908 and both captain Macbeth and second officer Googins were reprimanded for inattentive navigation and failure to use sounding machine and had their licences suspended for 30 days.

=== Return to commercial service ===
In 1907 Clyde Line was acquired together with a number of other lines by Charles W. Morse's holding company, Consolidated Steamship Lines, which collapsed in 1908. Several entities including Clyde and Mallory Lines were acquired by the Atlantic, Gulf & West Indies Steamship Lines in 1909 with most of the lines retaining their flags and vessels.

Following the grounding incident Chippewa resumed her usual trading activity between Jacksonville, Charleston and Boston, but in July 1909 a new route was added to her travels taking the vessel to Galveston. She departed New York for her new destination on July 20, 1909 and reached it on July 30. There she embarked a cargo consisting of 2,455 sacks of rice, 1,582 sacks of wool, cotton and other general goods and left next day for Boston via Jacksonville.

In April 1910 Chippewa was temporarily assigned to the Georgetown-Wilmington-New York route due to an increase in freight volume out of these southern ports. She arrived at Wilmington for the first visit on May 2 but only made two trips before being reallocated to her normal New York-Charleston-Jacksonville route in mid-May. Following the acquisition by AGWI, reorganization took place in summer 1910, with Chippewa temporarily being moved to the newly organized Mallory Line route between Baltimore and Galveston. She left Baltimore in her new capacity on September 9, 1910 with a cargo of 100,000 cases of canned goods and arrived at Galveston on September 17. She returned to Boston on October 3 with a cargo consisting of, among other things, 5,200 bales of cotton.

The steamer departed Baltimore for her second trip to Galveston on October 11, carrying a cargo of 106,000 cases of canned goods. The weather was rough throughout her journey, but it turned into a gale on October 15. The vessel continued on her journey, and passed Key West early in the morning of October 17, with the storm getting progressively stronger. At around 09:30 on October 17 Chippewa ran into the center of a hurricane, with the winds increasing in strength and reaching 100 mph (160 km/h) and with barometer dropping down to 28.60 inHg (969 mbar). The ship was at the storm's mercy for nearly five hours and could be hardly kept under control. By about 14:00 the storm started subsiding, and Chippewa resumed her westerly trip. Surprisingly, the steamer sustained only minor damage, amounting to blown out windows, torn out doors, and shifted cargo, which gave her a port list. The warning was issued on October 15, with most ships taking cover in harbors and ports along the coast, but since Chippewa lacked wireless she was unaware of it and continued sailing and only saw one vessel on her journey, believed to be a Morgan Line freighter (most likely SS Brazos). She managed to safely arrive at Galveston in the evening on October 19 still listing to port. The steamer made one more trip on the route before returning to her regular service from New York and Boston to Charleston and Jacksonville.

After leaving Charleston at around 19:00 of October 6, 1912 Chippewa ran into a northeasterly gale about two hours later, with the winds continuously increasing in strength until they reached hurricane strength. The vessel spent 56 hours covering 275 miles between Charleston and Cape Hatteras, and at times could barely steer. Eventually, the storm, which was the tail of another hurricane, turned towards Gulf stream and Chippewa could resume her voyage coming out largely unscathed and safely reaching Boston on October 11. On her next trip she ran aground about ten miles out of Jacksonville on October 20, but was able to refloat herself after several hours and could resume her trip suffering apparently no damage.

Following United States occupation of Veracruz in April 1914, it was reported on May 11 that Chippewa along with other vessels was chartered by the War Department for possible use as a transport, however, as the tensions subsided, she was released in June and went back to her regular commercial service sailing between Brunswick and New York, and then Boston and Galveston until the end of the year. On November 9 while berthed in Galveston harbor, she was run ashore by a strong storm and ebb tide that passed through the area, but was refloated in the evening on the same day without suffering any injuries. Early in 1915 she was temporarily put on Philadelphia to Tampa, Port Arthur, Texas City route with the Southern Steamship Company. In May 1915 Chippewa had to make an emergency trip down to Wilmington and transport nearly 1,500,000 feet of lumber to New York due to large freight congestion in that port following the loss of steamer Seminole. Rising prices of sugar during World War I made it very attractive for Clyde Steamship Company to add extra steamers to this lucrative trade, and Chippewa was no exception, making a couple of trips to Dominican Republic and Turks and Caicos Islands in September 1915. The steamer was next put on New York-Wilmington-Georgetown route, which she served until April 1916, before returning to her usual service.

=== 1916 Grounding ===
Chippewa left Jacksonville loaded with cargo of 500,000 feet of lumber, cotton, naval stores, fruits and vegetables on November 4, 1916. The steamer was under command of captain Maguirre and had a crew of 26 men. Shortly after leaving port she ran aground at Dames Point shoal, in the St. John's River and remained stranded for a few hours before being able to refloat herself and proceed to Boston via Charleston. The ship arrived in Buzzard's Bay in view of Cape Cod Canal early in the morning of November 10 during a strong gale and attempted to pick up a pilot to guide her to the port of Boston. However, Metropolitan Line's steamer Henry M. Whitney on passage from New York arrived just a few moments earlier and was able to secure pilot's services. Captain Maguirre attempted to maneuver the ship at the entrance of the canal while awaiting the pilot, and during one of the turns struck a rock about five miles from the canal entrance, off Wing's Neck. The water quickly rushed in flooding her engine room and extinguishing fires. The captain and the crew managed to safely get off the ship, which was in no danger being grounded in only 18 feet of water. Lighters Colonel and Trilby came to her help, bringing divers to assess and repair the damage. Chippewa was successfully refloated on November 16 and was towed to Boston by tugs Juno, Alert and Beckwith on the same day. The steamer's cargo was discharged there before she was placed in the East Boston drydock and it was discovered the vessel had her bottom plates indented or broken over 100 feet length of her hull. Chippewa was subsequently towed to New York for repairs which took around 3 weeks and cost her owner $39,600.00. Captain Maguirre was exonerated of the blame as the charts showed the area his ship ran aground had ample depth and therefore should have been safe to navigate.

=== Last years ===
Following return to service after her grounding accident, the vessel made one trip to Wilmington in December 1916 before being assigned to Mallory Line route to Mobile, Port Eads and other Gulf ports. In October 1917 following United States entry into World War I, Chippewa together with many other vessels over 2,500 tons capacity was requisitioned by the US Government. Under government control, Chippewa continued sailing between New York and Mobile until late October 1918 when she was temporarily put in New York to Tampa service following the loss of steamer San Saba.

With World War I coming to an end, Chippewa was put in drydock in New York at the end of 1918 and underwent extensive repairs before returning to her usual route in February 1919 which the vessel worked on until the end of the year. At the end of 1919 USSB allocated several steamers to Clyde Steamship Company to operate on Boston to Jacksonville route, with Chippewa being assigned temporarily to New York-Brunswick service. On March 31, 1920 the vessel left New York for West Indies and after visiting the ports of La Romana and Macoris returned on April 29 with a large cargo of sugar. Chippewa continued her trips to Dominican Republic and Cuba until the end of 1920 when due to overabundance of cargo and scarcity of freight, she was laid up in New York.

The steamer was reactivated in April 1923 and through the end of August 1925 continuously sailed between New York, Wilmington and Brunswick. At the end of August 1925, due to embargo imposed by several shipping lines and railroads on Florida there was a huge congestion of cargo in Jacksonville which needed to be moved down to Miami. Originally, it was planned for Chippewa to sail between these two ports, however, due to a strike by port workers in Miami demanding higher wages, the steamer instead brought around 150 stevedores from New York to take over unloading process. At the same time, she was berthed continuously in port through the end of January 1926, serving as temporary housing for New York workers while their permanent quarters were constructed.

After serving Clyde Steamship Company for over twenty three years, Chippewa was sold to Union Shipbuilding Company and arrived in Baltimore on October 15, 1928 in tow of wrecking steamer Columbine for breaking at their Fairfield Yard.
