= USS Lynx (SP-2) =

Patrol vessel of the United States Navy

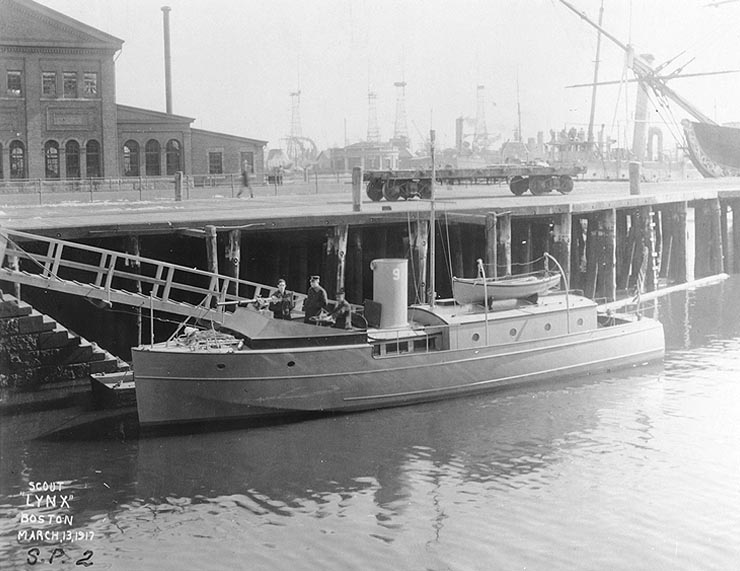
- Lynx at the Boston Navy Yard in Boston, Massachusetts, on 13 March 1917, already armed, just prior to her acquisition by the U.S. Navy for World War I service

History

United States
- Name: Lynx
- Namesake: Previous name retained
- Builder: George Lawley & Son, Neponset, Massachusetts
- Completed: 1916
- Acquired: 21 April 1917
- Commissioned: 9 July 1917
- Stricken: 24 August 1919
- Fate: Disposed of by burning 4 September 1919
- Notes: Operated as private motorboat Lynx 1916-1917

General characteristics
- Type: Patrol vessel
- Displacement: 7 tons
- Length: 45 ft 0 in (13.72 m)
- Beam: 10 ft 6 in (3.20 m)
- Draft: 3 ft 10 in (1.17 m)
- Speed: 25 knots
- Complement: 8
- Armament: 1 × 1-pounder gun

Note: USS Lynx (SP-2) should not be confused with patrol vessel USS Lynx II SP-730, later USS SP-730, which served in the United States Navy during the same period.

The second USS Lynx (SP-2) was an armed motorboat that served in the United States Navy as a patrol vessel and aviation support craft from 1917 to 1919.

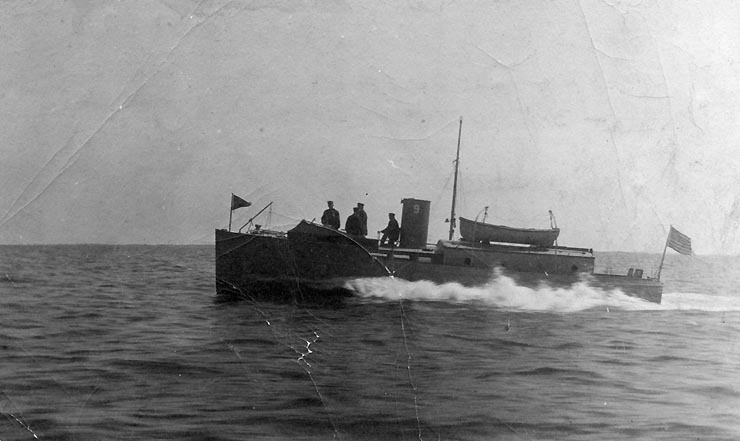
Lynx ca. 1916, prior to her U.S. Navy service, probably during a Coast Defense Reserve exercise.

Lynx was built as a private motorboat of the same name in 1916 by the George Lawley & Son at Neponset, Massachusetts. Her owner, Nathaniel F. Ayers, had her built specifically for participation in the Coast Defense Reserve as part of the Preparedness Movement. During her time in private hands in 1916 and early 1917, she participated in Coast Defense Reserve exercises.

By March 1917 she was armed and had U.S. Navy personnel aboard. The United States entered World War I in April 1917, and the Navy officially purchased her from Ayers on 21 April 1917. She was commissioned as USS Lynx (SP-2) on 9 July 1917.

Lynx initially served as a patrol boat in the 2nd Naval District, based at Newport, Rhode Island. In August 1917 she moved to Europe, where she was assigned to aviation support duty.

Lynx returned to the United States after World War I, arriving at New York City from Europe on 30 March 1919. She was stricken from the Naval Vessel Register on 24 August 1919. For purposes of disposal, she was condemned to be burned, and was burned on 4 September 1919.
