= USS Kiowa (ID-1842) =

Cargo ship of the United States Navy

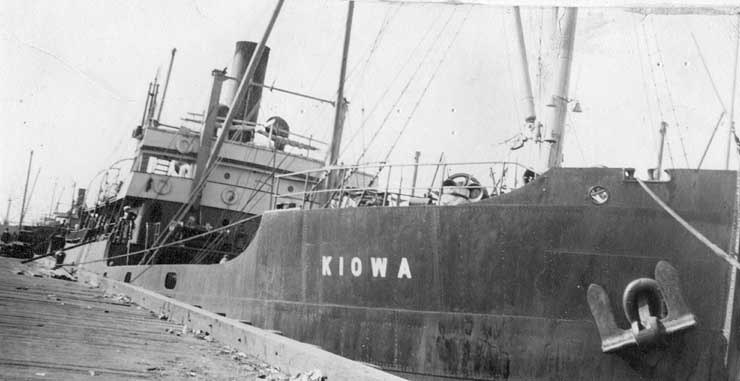
- SS Kiowa in port, probably around the time of her inspection for U.S. Navy service by the 3rd Naval District.

History

United States
- Name: USS Kiowa
- Namesake: Previous name retained
- Builder: American Shipbuilding Company, Cleveland, Ohio, Ohio
- Launched: 1917
- Acquired: 13 or 26 February 1918
- Commissioned: 26 February 1918
- Decommissioned: 16 January 1919
- Fate: Transferred to United States Shipping Board 16 January 1919
- Notes: Served as commercial cargo ship SS Kiowa 1917-1918 and as Valka, Kurzeme, and Elizebete 1919-1960

General characteristics
- Type: Cargo ship
- Tonnage: 2,039 gross register tons
- Displacement: 4,500 tons
- Length: 261 ft 9 in (79.78 m)
- Beam: 43 ft 6 in (13.26 m)
- Draft: 17 ft 9 in (5.41 m)
- Propulsion: One 1,200-indicated horsepower (895-kilowatt) steam engine, one shaft
- Speed: 9 knots
- Complement: 62
- Armament: 1 × 5-inch (127-mm) gun; 1 × 3-inch (76.2-mm) gun

The second USS Kiowa (ID-1842) was a cargo ship that served in the United States Navy from 1918 to 1919.

== Construction, acquisition, and commissioning ==
Kiowa was built as the commercial cargo ship SS Kiowa and launched in 1917 by the American Shipbuilding Company at Cleveland, Ohio, Ohio. Her design, which included an unusual rig, was based on a Norwegian design known as the Fredrickstad. She was one of the first of what became a large group of standard-type cargo ships constructed on the Great Lakes during World War I.

On 13 or 26 February 1918, the U.S. Navy took control of Kiowa from her owners, Agwilines Inc, for use during World War I and assigned her the naval registry identification number (Id. No.) 1842. She was commissioned on 26 February 1918 as USS Kiowa (ID-1842).

== U.S. Navy career ==
Assigned to the Naval Overseas Transportation Service, Kiowa arrived at Norfolk, Virginia, on 25 March 1918 to transport coal along the United States East Coast. She carried a cargo of coal from Norfolk to Boston, Massachusetts.

Kiowa returned to Norfolk during April 1918 to load naval mines and minelaying equipment for the squadron engaged in laying the North Sea Mine Barrage. She departed Norfolk on 30 April 1918 and arrived at Oban, Scotland, in the United Kingdom on 20 May 1918, after which she delivered mines and minelaying equipment to several ports in Scotland. She made two additional transatlantic voyages carrying naval mines and minelaying equipment to North Sea ports in July and September 1918.

Kiowa carried a load of coal from Norfolk to Charleston, South Carolina, in November 1918, then cleared Norfolk on 6 December 1918 with a cargo of coal for Bermuda. She returned to Norfolk on 22 December 1918 and decommissioned there on 16 January 1919 for simultaneous transfer to the United States Shipping Board and return to her owners.

== Later commercial service ==
Once again SS Kiowa, the ship resumed commercial service. She had a long commercial career, serving as SS Valka, as the Latvian SS Kurzeme, and as SS Elizebete.

Elizabete was scrapped in England in 1960.
