= USS Lynx II =

Patrol vessel of the United States Navy

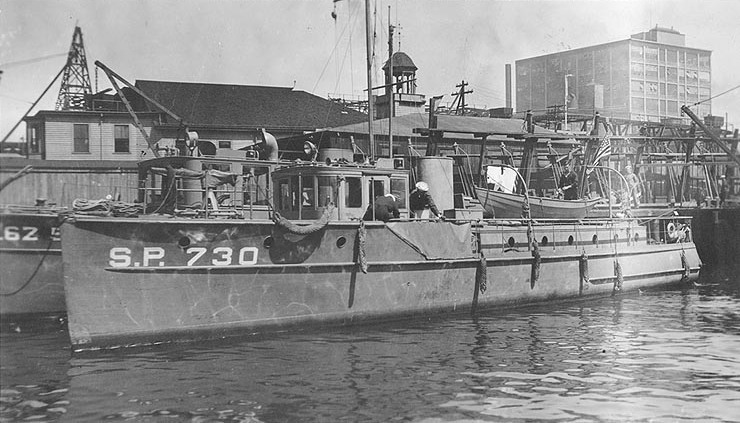
- USS Lynx II at Lockwood's Basin at Boston, Massachusetts, ca. 1918

History

United States
- Name: USS Lynx II
- Namesake: Previous name retained
- Builder: Herreshoff Manufacturing Company, Bristol, Rhode Island.
- Completed: 1917
- Acquired: 14 June 1917
- Commissioned: 9 July 1917
- Decommissioned: 19 May 1919
- Renamed: USS SP-730 in 1918
- Fate: Sold 2 September 1919

General characteristics
- Type: Patrol vessel
- Tonnage: 22 tons
- Length: 58 ft 0 in (17.68 m)
- Beam: 10 ft 11 in (3.33 m)
- Draft: 3 ft 0 in (0.91 m) mean
- Speed: 21 knots
- Complement: 9
- Armament: 1 × 1-pounder gun

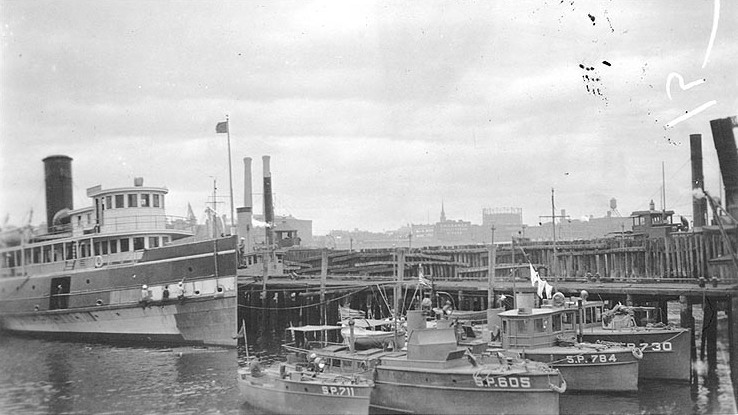
From left to right starting at bottom center of photograph, the U.S. Navy patrol vessels USS Kiowa (SP-711), USS Skink (SP-605), USS Whistler (SP-784), and USS Lynx II (SP-730) at Lockwood's Basin in Boston, Massachusetts, ca. 1918. The passenger and cargo ship USS Moosehead (ID-2047) is at left.

- Note: USS Lynx II (SP-730) should not be confused with patrol vessel USS Lynx (SP-2), which served in the United States Navy during the same period.

USS Lynx II (SP-730), later USS SP-730, was an armed motorboat that served in the United States Navy as a patrol vessel and harbor dispatch boat from 1917 to 1919.

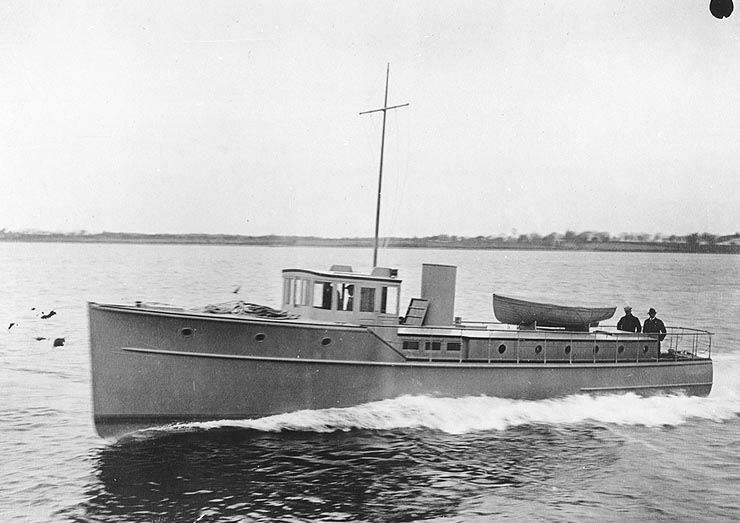
Lynx II ca. spring 1917 as a private motorboat, prior to her U.S. Navy service.

Lynx II was built as a private motorboat of the same name for Nathaniel F. Ayer of Boston, Massachusetts, in 1917 by Herreshoff Manufacturing Company at Bristol, Rhode Island, designed with Navy patrol service in mind. The U.S. Navy purchased her from Ayer on 14 June 1917. She was enrolled in the Naval Coast Defense Reserve on 21 June 1917, then commissioned on 9 July 1917 at Boston for service during World War I.

Assigned to the 1st Naval District, Lynx II throughout the period of the United States' participation in World War I served as a dispatch boat and dispatch and harbor patrol boat at Boston. She patrolled the Massachusetts coast from Boston to Provincetown. She also guided arriving and departing merchant ships through the defensive sea area of the Port of Boston. Probably to avoid confusion with patrol boat USS Lynx (SP-2)—another Ayer-built boat -- Lynx II was renamed USS SP-730 in 1918.

SP-730 was decommissioned on 19 May 1919. She was sold on 2 September 1919 to Kemp Machinery Company of Baltimore, Maryland.
