= List of Liberty ships (L) =

This is a list of Liberty ships with names beginning with L.

== Description ==
The standard Liberty ship (EC-2-S-C1 type) was a cargo ship 441 feet 6 inches (134.57 m) long overall, with a beam of 56 feet 10 3/4 inches (17.34 m). It had a depth of 37 feet 4 inches (11.38 m) and a draft of 26 feet 10 inches (8.18 m). It was powered by a triple expansion steam engine, which had cylinders of 24 1/2 inches (62 cm), 37 inches (94 cm) and 70 inches (180 cm) diameter by 48 inches (120 cm) stroke. The engine produced 2,500ihp at 76rpm. Driving a four-blade propeller 18 feet 6 inches (5.64 m) in diameter, could propel the ship at 11 knots (20 km/h).

Cargo was carried in five holds, numbered 1–5 from bow to stern. Grain capacity was 84,183 cubic feet (2,383.8 m^{3}), 145,604 cubic feet (4,123.0 m^{3}), 96,429 cubic feet (2,730.6 m^{3}), 93,190 cubic feet (2,639 m^{3}) and 93,190 cubic feet (2,639 m^{3}), with a further 49,086 cubic feet (1,390.0 m^{3}) in the deep tanks. Bale capacity was 75,405 cubic feet (2,135.2 m^{3}), 134,638 cubic feet (3,812.5 m^{3}), 83,697 cubic feet (2,370.0 m^{3}), 82,263 cubic feet (2,329.4 m^{3}) and 82,435 cubic feet (2,334.3 m^{3}), with a further 41,135 cubic feet (1,164.8 m^{3}) in the deep tanks.

It carried a crew of 45, plus 36 United States Navy Armed Guard gunners. Later in the war, this was altered to a crew of 52, plus 29 gunners. Accommodation was in a three deck superstructure placed midships. The galley was equipped with a range, a 25 US gallons (95 L) stock kettle and other appliances. Messrooms were equipped with an electric hot plate and an electric toaster.

== Lafcadio Hearn ==
Lafcadio Hearn was a tanker built by Delta Shipbuilding Company, New Orleans, Louisiana. She was delivered in September 1943. Built for the WSA, she was operated under the management of Tankers Co. Inc. Sold in 1948 to Polarus Steamship Co., New York and renamed Polarusoil. Sold in 1955 to Marathon Compania de Vapores, Panama and renamed Mycenae. Re-registered to Liberia and operated under the management of Adamanthos Ship Operating Inc. Converted to a cargo ship at Jacksonville, Florida. Lengthened at Kobe, Japan in 1959. Now 511 feet 6 inches (155.91 m) long and 8,588 GRT. Renamed Hydroussa in 1960 and re-registered to Greece. Placed under the management of Syros Shipping Co. that year. Renamed Dromon in 1964. Renamed Mycenae in 1966. Re-registered to Liberia and operated under the management of Pergamos Shipping Co. She was scrapped at Kaohsiung, Taiwan in 1969.

== Lambert Cadwalader ==
Lambert Cadwalader was built by Todd Houston Shipbuilding Corporation, Houston, Texas. Her keel was laid on 8 September 1942. She was launched on 16 November and delivered on 28 November. She was scrapped at Baltimore, Maryland in January 1960.

== Langdon Cheves ==
Langdon Cheves was built by Southeastern Shipbuilding Corporation, Savannah, Georgia. Her keel was laid on 29 March 1943. She was launched on 22 May and delivered on 25 June. She was scrapped at Baltimore in January 1961.

== La Salle Seam ==
La Salle Seam was a collier built by Delta Shipbuilding Company. 20 November 1944. She was launched on 24 January 1945 and delivered on 31 March. Built for the WSA, she was operated under the management of Boland & Cornelius. Sold in 1946 to Marine Interests Corp., Jersey City, New Jersey. Renamed Marine Trader in 1947. Sold in 1952 to Marine Navigation Co. Placed under the management of Marine Transport Lines in 1962. Returned to the United States Government in 1967. She was scrapped at Santander, Spain in March 1968.

== Laura Bridgman ==
Laura Bridgman was built by J. A. Jones Construction Company, Brunswick, Georgia. Her keel was laid on 23 September 1944. She was launched on 30 October and delivered on 13 November. Built for the WSA, she was operated under the management of Pope & Talbot Inc. Laid up in 1950, she was sold in 1951 to Drytrans Inc., New York and renamed Catherine. Sold in 1957 to Bulkcargo Shipping Corp. and renamed Penn Explorer. Re-registered to Liberia and operated under the management of Penn Shipping Co. Re-registered to the United States later that year. Sold in 1958 to Penntrans Co., remaining under the same flag and management. Sold in 1962 to Friendship Navigation Corp. and renamed Grand Explorer. Re-registered to Liberia and operated under the management of Sea King Corp. She was scrapped at Kaohsiung in February 1968.

== Laura Drake Gill ==
Laura Drake Gill was built by Todd Houston Shipbuilding Corporation. Her keel was laid on 1 June 1944. She was launched on 8 July and delivered on 19 July. Built for the WSA, she was operated under the management of T. J. Stevenson & Co. Management transferred to Matson Navigation Co., San Francisco, California in 1946. Sold to her managers later that year. Renamed Hawaiian Lumberman in 1947. Sold in 1960 to Northern Steamship Co., New York and renamed Cape Henry. Sold in 1062 to Artemison Steamship Co., Panama and renamed Trikeri. Re-registered to Greece and operated under the management of Northern Ships Agency. Re-registered to Liberia later that year. Sold in 1965 to Kelly Shipping Corp. and renamed Dahlia. Remaining under the Liberian flag and operated under the management of Kai Lee Marine Lines. She was scrapped at Kaohsiung in February 1967.

== Laura Keene ==
Laura Keene was built by Kaiser Company, Vancouver, Washington. She was delivered in February 1943. Laid up in the James River post-war. She was used to store grain in the 1950s. She arrived at Bilbao, Spain for scrapping in February 1973.

== Laurence J. Gallagher ==
Laurence J. Gallahgher was built by Delta Shipbuilding Company. Her keel was laid on 24 January 1945. She was launched on 28 February and delivered on 4 May. Built for the WSA, she was operated under the management of Norton Lilly Management Co. Laid up in the James River in 1947. Sold in 1951 to Firth Steamship Corp., New York and renamed Nigel. Sold in 1958 to Long, Quinn & Boylen Co., New York and renamed Russell L. Sold in 1961 to Amerind Shipping Corp., New York. Sold in 1962 to Earl J. Smith & Co., New York. Sold in 1965 to U.S. Bulk Carriers Inc. and renamed U.S. Red River. Laid up at Hong Kong in 1966, she was scrapped at Kaohsiung in September that year.

== Lawrence D. Tyson ==
Lawrence D. Tyson was built by North Carolina Shipbuilding Company, Wilmington, North Carolina. Her keel was laid on 5 June 1943. She was launched on 3 July and delivered on 10 July. Laid up in the James River post-war, she was scrapped at Bilbao in September 1971.

== Lawrence Gianella ==
Lawrence Gianella was built by Permanente Metals Corporation, Richmond, California. Her keel was laid on 11 November 1943. She was launched on 29 November and delivered on 12 December. Built for the WSA, she was operated under the management of Matson Navigation Co. Sold in 1947 to Compania Caribbean de Transports Maritima, Panama and renamed Mary G. She lost her propeller 200 nautical miles (370 km) off Land's End, United Kingdom on 14 September 1947 whilst on a voyage from Antwerp, Belgium to an American port. A tug was sent to her assistance. Sold in 1948 to Scindia Steam Navigation Co., Bombay, India and renamed Jalakala. Re-registered to the United Kingdom and operated under the management of Narottam Morarjee. Re-registered to India in 1957. Sold in 1960 to China Pacific Navigation Co., Hong Kong and renamed Chipbee. Re-registered to the United Kingdom. Sold in 1964 to Woodline Inc. and renamed Stanwood. Re-registered to Liberia and operated under the management of Atlas Steamship Agency. She was scrapped at Osaka, Japan in March 1965.

== Lawrence J. Brengle ==
Lawrence J. Brengle was built by Bethlehem Fairfield Shipyard, Baltimore. Her keel was laid on 3 March 1944. She was launched on 5 April and delivered on 18 April. Built for the WSA, she was operated under the management of Blidberg Rothchild Co. Sold in 1947 to Ponchelet Marine Corp., New York and renamed Ara J. Ponchelet. Sold in 1948 to Stone Steamship Co. and renamed Michael J. Goulandris. Operated under the management of Orion Shipping & Trading Co. Sold in 1953 to Nueva Cordoba Compania de Armamente and renamed Michael G. Re-registered to Panama, remaining under the same management. Sold in 1961 to Dominion Shipping Corp. and re-registered to Greece. Damaged by fire at Tilbury, United Kingdom on 21 June 1962. Sold in 1963 to Compania Navigation Continental, Panama and renamed Michelin. Re-registered to Liberia, remaining under the same management. Sold in 1965 to Taiwan Navigation Co., Taipei, Taiwan and renamed Tai Nan. Re-registered to China. Re-registered to Taiwan in 1965. She was scrapped at Kaohsiung in 1968.

== Lawrence T. Sullivan ==
Lawrence T. Sullivan was built by New England Shipbuilding Corporation, South Portland, Maine. Her keel was laid on 29 January 1945. She was launched as Lawrence T. Sullivan on 28 March and delivered as Belgian Amity on 7 April. To the Belgian Government in 1946, operated under the management of Compagnie Maritime Belge, Antwerp. Renamed Capitaine Limbor in 1947 and placed under the management of Agence Maritime International. Sold in 1962 to Society Navigation Pan Europea, Panama and renamed Capitaine. Operated under the management of Società per Azione Industria Armamento. Sold later that year to Nevada Shipping Co., Panama and renamed Nevada. Operated under the management of Keller Shipping Ltd. She was scrapped at Gandia, Spain in May 1971.

== Lawton B. Evans ==
Lawton B. Evans was built by Alabama Drydock Company, Mobile, Alabama. She was completed on 31 January 1943. She was scrapped at Baltimore in January 1960.

== Le Baron Russell Briggs ==
LeBaron Russell Briggs was built by J. A. Jones Construction Company, Panama City, Florida. Her keel was laid on 29 March 1944. She was launched on 12 May and delivered on 31 May. Laid up in the Hudson River post-war, she was scuttled 283 nautical miles (524 km) off Cape Kennedy, Florida with a cargo of obsolete chemical ammunition on 18 August 1970.

== Lee S. Overman ==
Lee S. Overman was built by North Carolina Shipbuilding Company. Her keel was laid on 16 May 1943. She was launched on 11 June and delivered on 17 June. Built for the WSA, she was operated under the management of Blidberg Rothchild & Co. She struck a mine and sank off Le Havre, France on 11 November 1944 whilst on a voyage from New York to Le Havre.

== Leif Ericson ==
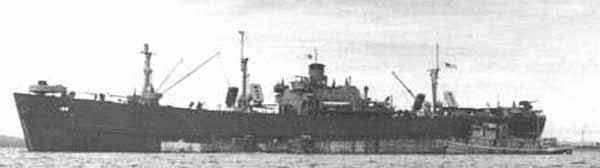
USS Porcupine

Leif Ericson was a tanker built by Delta Shipbuilding Company. Her keel was laid on 11 October 1943. She was launched on 24 December and delivered on 29 December. To the United States Navy, renamed Porcupine. Bombed and severely damaged in a Japanese aerial attack in the Leyte Gulf on 30 December 1944.

== Leif M. Olson ==
Leif M. Olson was built by New England Shipbuilding Corporation. Her keel was laid on 12 February 1945. She was launched on 14 April and delivered on 26 April. Laid up at Mobile post-war, she was scrapped at Panama City, Florida in January 1971.

== Lektor Garbo ==
Lektor Garbo was built by Walsh-Kaiser Company, Providence, Rhode Island. Launched as Alfred L. Baxlay, she was completed as Lektor Garbo in February 1945. Sold to D/S A/S Theologos, Haugesund, Norway. Operated under the management of Nils Rogenaes. Renamed N. O. Rogenaes in 1947. She collided with the Dutch ship Prins Alexander in the English Channel on 10 July 1952. Prins Alexander was towed in to Dover, United Kingdom. Sold in 1960 to Namdal Shipping & Trading Co. and renamed Kalu. Re-registered to Liberia and placed under the management of Carl Anne & Compania. Sold in 1961 to Compania Navegacão e Comercio Pan-American, Rio de Janeiro. She was scrapped in Brazil in April 1973.

== Leland Stanford ==
Leland Stanford was built by California Shipbuilding Corporation. Terminal Island, Los Angeles, California. Her keel was laid on 23 June 1942. She was launched on 4 August and delivered on 25 August. She was scrapped at Oakland in August 1967.

== Leo J. Duster ==
Leo J. Duster was built by Bethlehem Fairfield Shipyard. Her keel was laid on 25 October 1965. She was launched on 21 November and delivered on 30 November. Built for the WSA, she was operated under the management of Standard Fruit & Steamship Co. Management transferred to American Liberty Steamship Co. in 1946. Sold in 1947 to Weyerhaeuser Steamship Co., Newark, New Jersey and renamed F. S. Bell. Sold in 1963 to Cargo Ships & Tankers Inc., New York and renamed Bat. Sold in 1966 to Deluro Steamships Inc. and renamed Deluro. Re-registered to Liberia and operated under the management of Apollo Shipping Inc. She was scrapped at Kaohsiung in April 1969.

== Leon Godchaux ==
Leon Godchaux was a tanker built by Delta Shipbuilding Company. Her keel was laid on as Leon Godchaux 16 November 1943. She was launched as Wildcat on 7 January 1944 and delivered on 16 February. To the United States Navy, converted to a water distilling ship at Key West Navy Yard, Florida. Returned to USMC in January 1947 and renamed Leon Godchaux. Laid up in Puget Sound. She was scrapped at Portland, Oregon in March 1968.

== Leon S. Merrill ==
Leon S. Merrill was built by New England Shipbuilding Corporation. Her keel was laid on 4 December 1944. She was launched on 27 January 1945 and delivered on 5 February. She was sold to shipbreakers in New Orleans in October 1965. She was cut in two, with the stern section being scrapped by July 1967. The bow section was converted to a derrick barge.

== Leonardo L. Romero ==
Leonardo L. Romero was built by Todd Houston Shipbuilding Company. Her keel was laid on 4 January 1945. She was launched on 4 February and delivered on 16 February. Built for the WSA, she was operated under the management of Polarus Steamship Co. Laid up in 1949. Sold in 1951 to Arc Steamship Corp and renamed Chian Trader. Operated under the management of Mar-Trade Corp. Sold in 1957 to American Coal Shipping Inc., New York and renamed Coal Miner. Sold in 1960 to Blix Steamship Co. and renamed Peter Blix. Operated under the management of Cargo Ships & Tankers Inc. Lengthened at Tokyo in 1961. Now 511 feet 6 inches (155.91 m) long and 8,539 GRT Renamed Meteor that year and re-registered to Liberia. Sold in 1969 to Kentfield Shipping Corp. Re-registered to the United States and operated under the management of Asia Bulk Carriers. She was scrapped at Chittagong, East Pakistan in January 1970.

== Leonidas Merritt ==
Leonidas Merritt was built by Permanente Metals Corporation. Her keel was laid on 31 May 1943. She was launched on 30 June and delivered on 17 July. Built for the WSA, she was operated under the management of United States Lines. She was damaged by fire in a kamikaze attack at Leyte on 12 November 1944. She was repaired at Astoria, Washington and returned to service. Laid up post-war, she was scrapped at Kearny in February 1970.

== Leonidas Polk ==
Leonidas Polk was built by Delta Shipbuilding Company. Her keel was laid on 24 November 1942. She was launched on 7 January 1943 and delivered on 21 January. She was scrapped at New Orleans in February 1965.

== Leopard ==
Leopard was a tanker built by Delta Shipbuilding Company. She was laid down as William B. Bankhead on 5 October 1943. Launched as Leopard on 15 November and delivered to the United States Navy on 24 December. Returned to the WSA in June 1946 and renamed William B. Bankhead. Sold in 1948 to Manning Bros., New York and renamed Yankee Fighter. Converted to a cargo ship at Staten Island, New York in 1949. Now 7,214 GRT. Renamed Fighter in 1951. Sold in 1955 to Carreto Compania Navigation, Panama and renamed Carreto. Re-registered to Liberia and operated under the management of United Tankers Corp. Management transferred to Mavroleon Bros. in 1958. Sold in 1960 to Ithacamar Compania Navigation, Panama and renamed Zoe. Re-registered to Greece and operated under the management of Sphere Ship Operators. She struck a submerged object and sprang a leak in the Atlantic Ocean off the coast of Brazil (33°30′S 52°27′W) on `14 July 1965 whilst on a voyage from Chimbote, Peru to the Rio Grande. She arrived at her destination on 17 July and was declared a constructive total loss. She was sold to shipbreakers at Porto Alegre, Brazil.

== Leopold Damrosch ==
Leopold Damrosch was built by California Shipbuilding Corporation. Her keel was laid on 29 October 1943. She was launched on 25 November and delivered on 18 December. She was scrapped in Baltimore in September 1961.

== Leslie M. Shaw ==
Lesle M. Shaw was built by Permanente Metals Corporation. Her keel was laid on 15 November 1942. She was launched on 22 December and delivered on 31 December. She was scrapped at Baltimore in October 1961.

== Lesvos ==
Lesvos was built by New England Shipbuilding Corporation. Her keel was laid on 21 February 1945. She was launched as Charles H. Shaw on 19 April and delivered as Lesvos on 19 May. To the Greek Government under Lend-Lease. Sold in 1946 to Livanos Maritime Co. and renamed Meandros. Renamed Alfios in 1962. Sold in 1964 to Atlantic Freighters Ltd. and renamed Atlantic Sailor. Remaining under the Greek flag and operated under the management of S. Livanos. She was scrapped at Kaohsiung in April 1967.

== Levi Woodbury ==
Levi Woodbury was built by Bethlehem Fairfield Shipyard. Her keel was laid on 11 March 1943. She was launched on 15 April and delivered on 26 April. She was scrapped in Philadelphia in August 1964.

== Lew Wallace ==
Lew Wallace was a training ship built by Permanente Metals Corporation. Her keel was laid on 4 June 1942. She was launched on 29 July and delivered on 5 September. She was scrapped at Portland, Oregon in June 1970.

== Lewis Cass ==
Lewis Cass was built by California Shipbuilding Corporation. Her keel was laid on 27 November 1942. She was launched on 29 December and delivered on 12 January 1943. Built for the WSA, she was operated under the management of Waterman Steamship Co. She was driven ashore and wrecked on Guadalupe Island, Mexico (29°11′N 118°17′W) on 26 January 1943 whilst on a voyage from Los Angeles to "Balboa".

== Lewis Emery Jr. ==
Lewis Emery Jr. was built by Bethlehem Fairfield Shipyard. Her keel was laid on 22 September 1943. She was launched on 15 October and delivered on 25 October. Built for the WSA, she was operated under the management of Merchants & Miners Transportation Co. Laid up at Wilmington, North Carolina post war. Sold in 1951 to Victory Carriers Inc., New York. Sold in 1957 to Alex S. Onassis Corp. and re-registered to Liberia. Operated under the management of her former owner. Sold in 1961 to Edina Transportation Co. and renamed Catcher. Operated under the management of Olympic Maritime S.A. She was scrapped at Bilbao in August 1968.

== Lewis L. Dyche ==
Lewis L. Dyche was built by Oregon Shipbuilding Corporation. Her keel was laid on 6 November 1943. She was launched on 26 November and delivered on 9 December. Built for the WSA, she was operated under the management of Interocean Steamship Corp. She exploded and sank following a kamikaze attack at Mindoro, Philippines on 4 January 1945 whilst on a voyage from an American port to Mindoro.

== Lewis Morris ==
Lewis Morris was built by Permanente Metals Corporation. Her keel was laid on 3 March 1942. She was launched on 22 May and delivered on 19 June. She was scrapped at Oakland in January 1961.

== Leyte ==
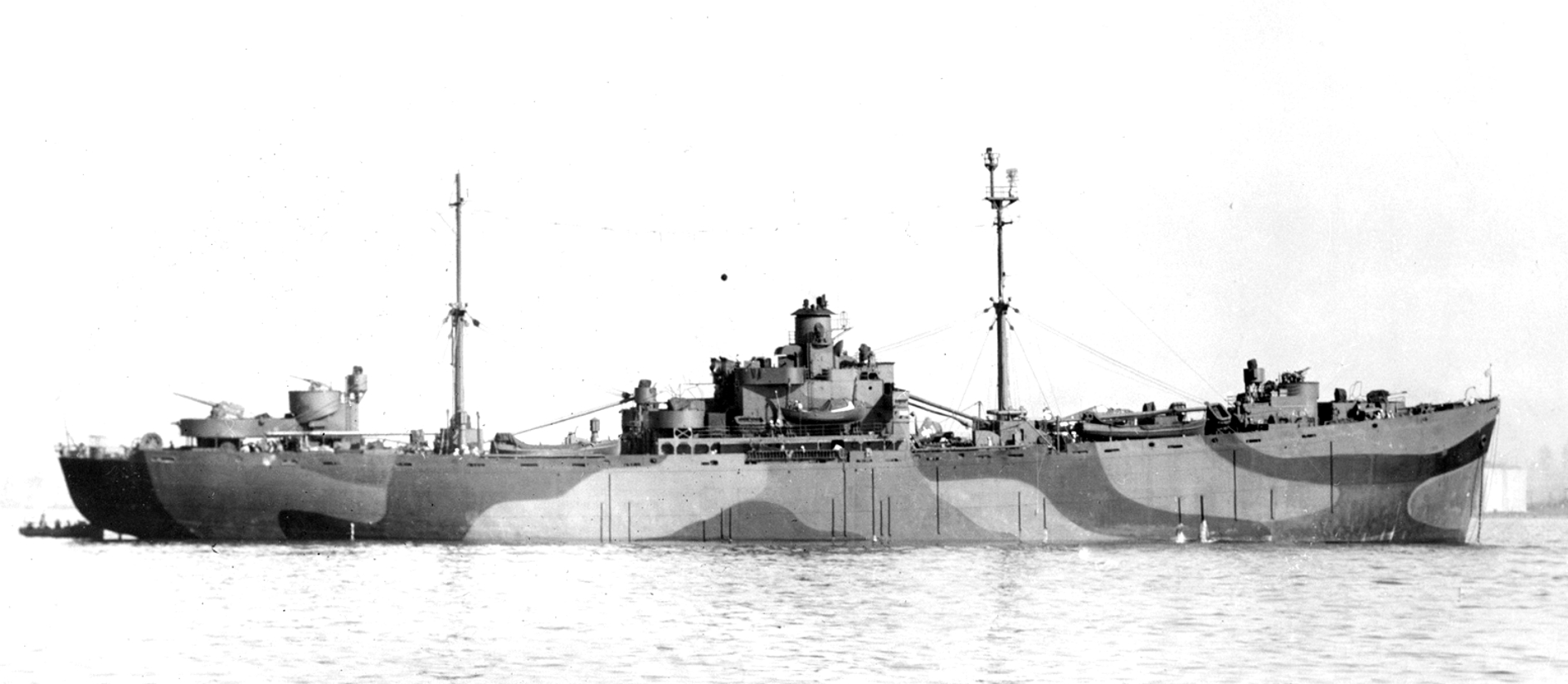
USS Leyte

Leyte was built by Bethlehem Fairfield Shipyard. Her keel was laid on 20 January 1944. She was launched on 18 February and delivered on 25 February. To the United States Navy. Renamed Maui in May 1945. Laid up at San Diego, California in August 1946. Subsequently moved to Suisun Bay. She was sold for scrapping at Richmond in October 1972.

== L. H. McNelly ==
L. H. McNelly was built by Todd Houston Shipbuilding Corporation. Her keel was laid on 1 September 1943. She was launched on 19 October and delivered on 26 October. Built for the WSA, she was operated under the management of Parry Navigation Co. To the Dutch Government in 1946 and renamed Zeeman. Sold in 1947 to Koninklijke Rotterdamsche Lloyd. Sold in 1950 to Stoomboots Maatschappij Hillegersberg and renamed Trompenberg. Operated under the management of Vinke & Co. Sold in 1959 to Santa Fe Riviera and renamed Santa Fe. Re-registered to Liberia and operated under the management of Amerind Shipping Corp. Lengthened at Tokyo that year. Now 511 feet 6 inches (155.91 m) long and 8,327 GRT. Sold in 1961 to Compania Naviera Santa Fe Ltda, Santiago. She lost radio contact in the Strait of Magellan 30 nautical miles (56 km) north of Isla Huamblin (44°40′S 75°00′W) on 13 August 1967 whilst on a voyage from Coquimbo to San Nicolas. No further trace, presumed foundered. Wreckage spotted on 17 August off Rowett Island was presumed to be from Santa Fe.

== Liguria ==
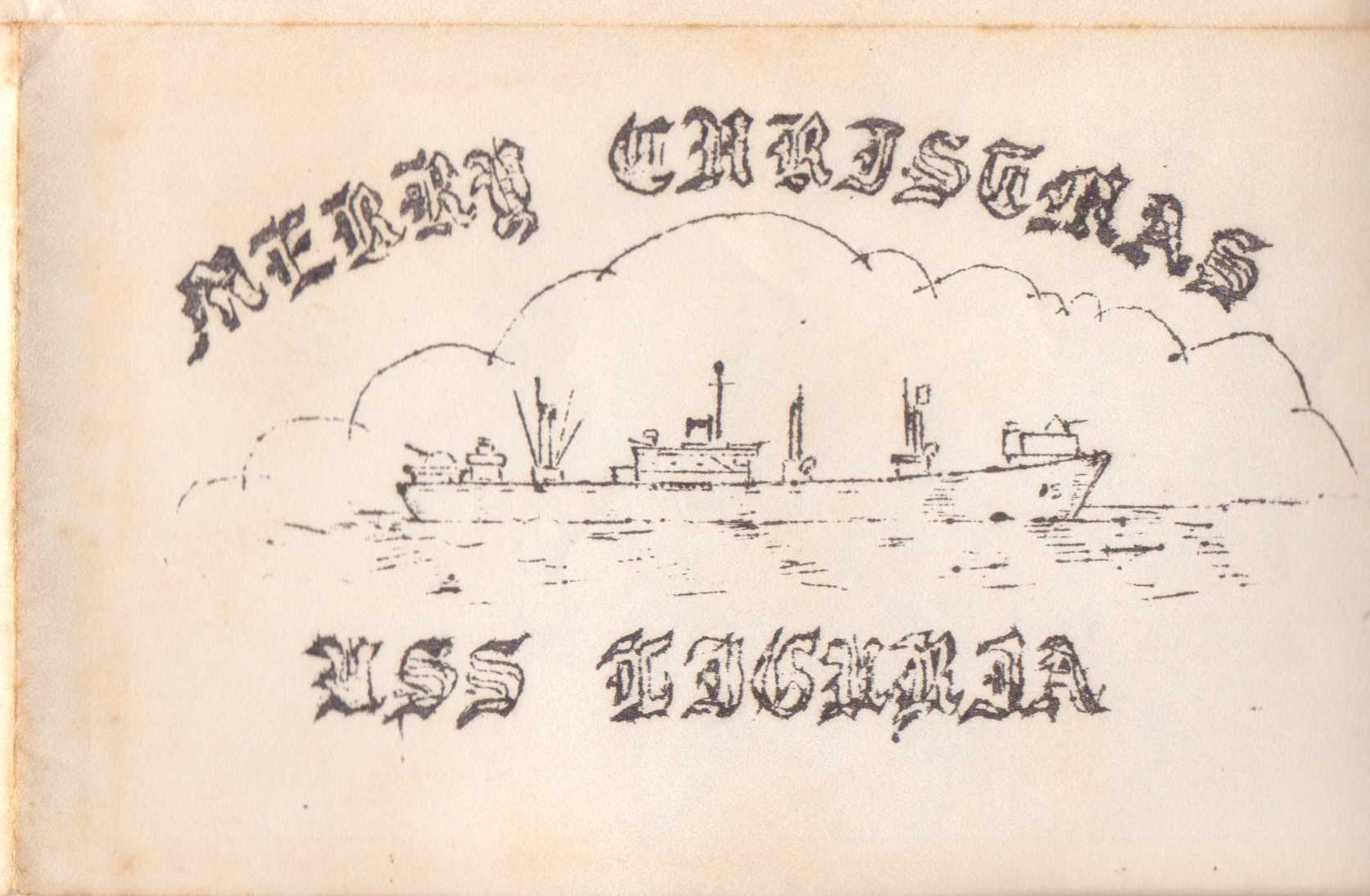
Christmas card from and of USS Liguria

Liguria was built by New England Shipbuilding Corporation. Her keel was laid on 19 September 1944. She was launched on 3 November and delivered on 20 November. To the United States Navy. Laid up in reserve at Pearl Harbor in June 1946. Towed to San Francisco in April 1947. Returned to USMC and laid up in Suisun Bay. Sold to shipbreakers in South Korea in August 1974.

== Lillian Nordica ==
Lillian Nordica was built by New England Shipbuilding Corporation. Her keel was laid on 1 February 1944. She was launched on 17 March and delivered on 30 March. She was scrapped at Wilmington, North Carolina in September 1965.

== Lillian Wald ==
Lillian Wald was built by Permanente Metals Corporation. Her keel was laid on 9 December 1943. She was launched on 30 December and delivered on 7 January 1944. Built for the WSA, she was operated under the management of Weyerhaeuser Steamship Co. Sold in 1947 to Enrico Insom, Rome and renamed Giorgio. Sold in 1960 to Slobodna Plovidba, Šibenik, Yugoslavia and renamed Dorcol. She was scrapped at Split, Yugoslavia in April 1970.

== Lincoln Steffens ==
Lincoln Steffens was built by California Shipbuilding Corporation. Her keel was laid on 11 October 1942. She was launched on 14 November and delivered on 3 December. Laid up in the James River post-war, she was scrapped at Philadelphia in May 1971.

== Lindley M. Garrison ==
Lindley M. Garrison was built by Oregon Shipbuilding Corporation. Her keel was laid on 7 December 1942. She was launched on 31 December and delivered on 7 January 1943. She was scrapped at Everett, Washington in August 1961.

== Linn Boyd ==
Linn Boyd was built by Delta Shipbuilding Company. Her keel was laid on 5 December 1943. She was launched on 28 January 1944 and delivered on 5 March. She was scrapped at Mobile in December 1967.

== Linton Seam ==
Linton Seam was a collier built by Delta Shipbuilding Company. Her keel was laid on 12 December 1944. She was launched on 21 February 1945 and delivered on 17 April. Built for the WSA, she was operated under the management of Sprague Steamship Co., Boston. She was sold to her managers in 1947. Renamed Seaconnet in 1948. Sold in 1963 to Seacrest Investment Co. and renamed Seacomet. Re-registered to Liberia and operated under the management of Mercantile Navigation Co. She was scrapped at Bilbao in July 1964.

== Lionel Copley ==
Lionel Copley was built by Bethlehem Fairfield Shipyard. Her keel was laid on 16 July 1943. She was launched as Lionel Copley on 12 August and delivered as Sambrake on 20 August. To the MoWT under Lend-Lease. Operated under the management of Ellerman & Bucknall Steamship Co. Ltd. Sold in 1947 to Ellerman Lines Ltd. and renamed City of Chelmsford, remaining under the same management. Sold in 1959 to Compania Navigation Vaptistis, Panama and renamed San George. Re-registered to Greece and operated under the management of Lemos & Pateras. Converted to a motor vessel at Newport, United Kingdom in 1960. Two Mirrlees, Bickerton & Day diesel engines fitted. Re-registered to Lebanon in 1961. Management was transferred to Lemos & Co. in 1963. Sold in 1968 to Suerte Shipping Co. and renamed Suerte. Re-registered to Cyprus and operated under the management of Papadimitiou. She was scrapped at Split in March 1972.

== Lloyd S. Carlson ==
Lloyd S. Carlson was built by Todd Houston Shipbuilding Corporation. Her keel was laid on 7 December 1944. She was launched on 13 January 1945 and delivered on 23 January. Built for the WSA, she was operated under the management of American Liberty Steamship Co. Management transferred to Dichmann, Wright & Pugh in 1946. She was laid up in 1949. Sold in 1951 to Bloomfield Steamship Co., Houston and renamed Mary Adams. Sold in 1955 to Shephard Steamship Co., Boston and renamed Wind Rush. Sold in 1959 to Debardeleben Marine Corp. and renamed Debardeleben Marine I. Operated under the management of Coyle Lines. Converted to a bulk chemical carrier at Baltimore in 1960. Now 7,115 GRT. Sold in 1962 to Texas Gulf Sulphur Co. and renamed Texas Gulf Sulphur I. Sold in 1967 to Hudson Waterways Corp. Operated under the management of Transwestern Associates Inc. Returned to the United States Government in 1969 in exchange for the type C4 ship General W. C. Langfitt. She was scrapped at New Orleans in March 1970.

== Loammi Baldwin ==
Loammi Baldwin was built by New England Shipbuilding Corporation. Her keel was laid on 17 August 1944. She was launched on 3 October and delivered on 19 October. She was scrapped at Philadelphia in 1965.

== Lorado Taft ==
Lorado Taft was built by Todd Houston Shipbuilding Corporation. Her keel was laid on 13 July 1944. She was launched on 19 August and delivered on 30 August. She was scrapped at Philadelphia in September 1966.

== Lord Delaware ==
Lord Delaware was built by Bethlehem Fairfield Shipyard. Her keel was laid on 14 November 1942. She was launched on 19 December and delivered on 30 December. Laid up in the Hudson River post-war, she was scrapped at Santander in April 1971.

== Lorenzo C. McCarthy ==
Lorenzo C. McCarthy was a boxed aircraft transport built by New England Shipbuilding Corporation. Her keel was laid on 23 May 1945. She was launched on 31 July and delivered on 15 September. Laid up at Mobile post-war, she was scrapped at Panama City, Florida in July 1971.

== Lorenzo de Zavala ==
Lorenzo de Zavala was built by Todd Houston Shipbuilding Corporation. Her keel was laid on 19 April 1943. She was launched on 29 May and delivered on 14 June. She was scrapped at Philadelphia in October 1964.

== Lorrin A. Thurston ==
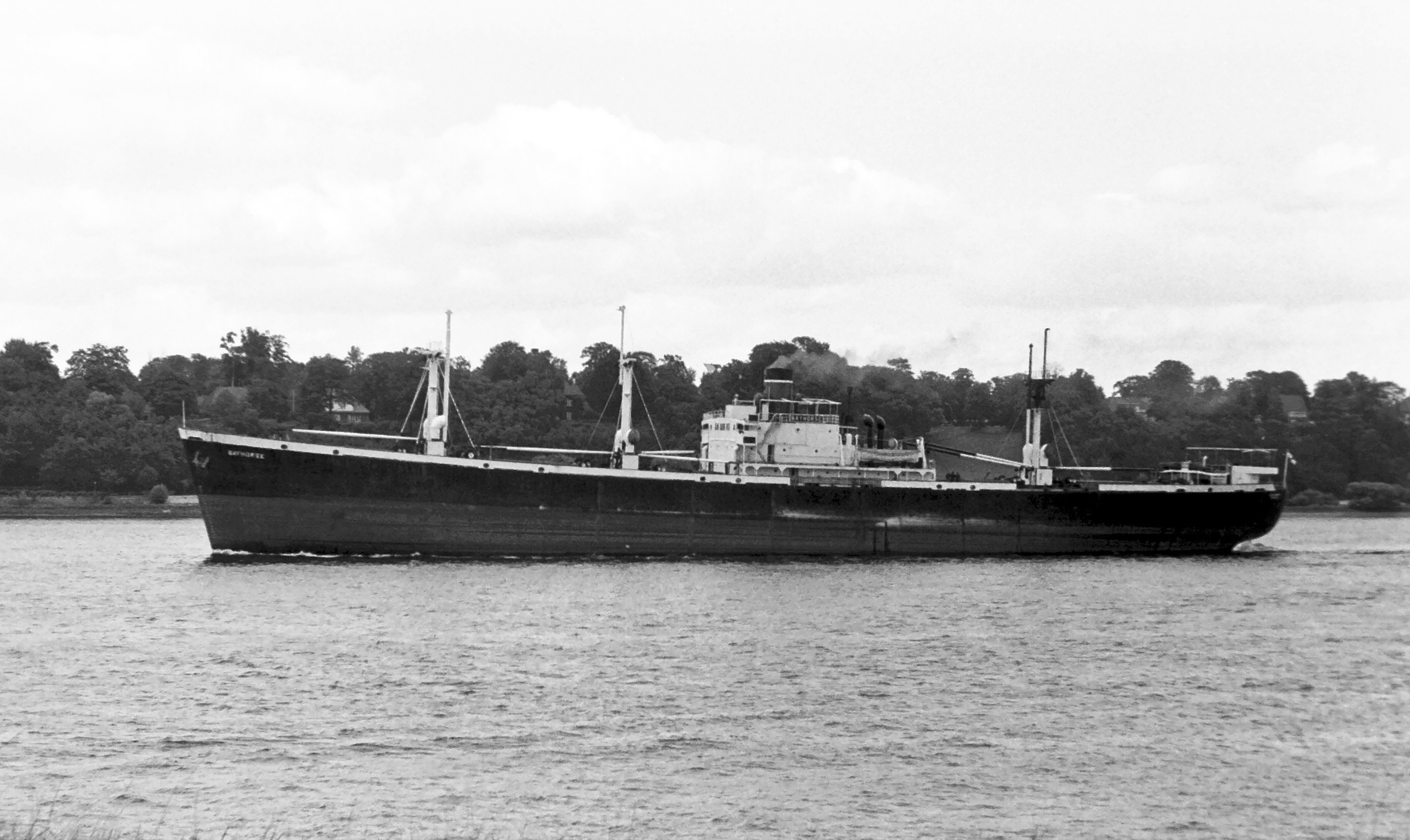
Bayhorse

Lorrin A Thurston was built by California Shipbuilding Corporation. Her keel was laid on 18 August 1943. She was launched as Lorrin A. Thurston on 10 September and delivered as Samcalia on 23 September. To the MoWT under Lend-Lease. Operated under the management of Furness, Withy & Co., London. Sold to her managers in 1947 and renamed Pacific Liberty. Sold in 1954 to Febo Amedeo Bertorello Societá, Genoa and renamed Phoebus. Sold in 1962 to Seatide Shipping Co., Lugano and renamed Bayhorse. Re-registered to Liberia. Re-registered to Panama in 1966. Sold in 1970 to Compania di Navigazione Houston, Lugano and renamed San Gabriel, remaining under the Panamanian flag. She was scrapped at Split in March 1970.

== Lot M. Morrill ==
Lot M. Morrill was built by New England Shipbuilding Corporation. Her keel was laid on 8 June 1944. She was launched on 29 July and delivered on 5 August. She was scrapped at Portland, Oregon in May 1967.

== Lot Morrill ==
Lot Morrill was built by New England Shipbuilding Corporation. Her keel was laid on 20 April 1944. She was launched as Lot Morrill on 7 June and delivered as Miaoulis on 23 June. To the Greek Government under Lend-Lease. Sold in 1946 to Pateras & Mavrophillipas Bros., Athens and renamed Mariam. Operated under the management of Lymas & Lemas. Sold in 1949 to Irinico Steamship Co., Piraeus. Operated under the management of Triton Shipping Co. Sold in 1960 to Asterion Shipping Co., Piraeus and renamed Ariston. Operated under the management of Lyras Bros. She was scrapped at Sakai, Japan in October 1967.

== Lot Whitcomb ==
Lot Whitcomb was built by Oregon Shipbuilding Corporation. Her keel was laid on 17 January 1943. She was launched on 16 February and delivered on 26 February. Built for the WSA, she was operated under the management of Shepard Steamship Co. Sold in 1947 to Michael V. Vassilaiades, Chios, Greece and renamed Flight Lieutenant Vassiliades, R.A.F. Renamed Mitropolis in 1963. Sold in 1966 to Delmar Armadora, Panama. Remaining under the Greek flag and operated under the management of Poseidon Shipping Ltd. She put in to Manzanillo, Mexico on 28 October 1966 in a leaky condition whilst on a voyage from Houston to a Korean port. She sailed on 28 November for Portland, Oregon, where she was to be repaired. She was detained in August 1867 for debt. Sold in 1967 to Pacific Coast Shipping Co. Re-registered to Liberia and operated under the management of Lasco Shipping Co. Sold in January 1968 to Zidell Explorations Inc., Portland, Oregon. She departed under tow on 24 August for Kaohsiung, where she was scrapped in October 1968.

== Lou Gehrig ==
Lou Gehrig was built by New England Shipbuilding Corporation. Her keel was laid on 21 October 1942. She was launched on 17 January 1943 and delivered on 30 January. She was scrapped at Kearny in 1966.

== Louis A. Godey ==
Louis A. Godey was built by Southeastern Shipbuilding Corporation. Her keel was laid on 12 November 1943. She was launched as Louis A. Godey on 20 December and delivered as Samvannah on 30 December. To the MoWT, operated under the management of Anchor Line. Returned to the USMC in 1948, officially renamed Louis A. Godey. Laid up at Beaumont bearing name Samvannah. She was scrapped at Orange, Texas in 1961.

== Louis Agassiz ==
Louis Agassiz was built by Oregon Shipbuilding Corporation. Her keel was laid on 24 March 1943. She was launched as Louis Agassiz on 13 April and delivered as Emilian Pugachev on 21 April. Transferred to the Soviet Union. Renamed Yemelyan Pugachnyov in 1977. She was scrapped in the Soviet Union in June 1977.

== Louisa M. Alcott ==
Louisa M. Alcott was built by Bethlehem Fairfield Shipyard. Her keel was laid on 30 April 1943. She was launched on 28 May and delivered on 9 June. Laid up in the James River post-war, she was scrapped at Bilbao in November 1970.

== Louis A. Sengteller ==
Louis A. Sengteller was built by Permanente Metals Corporation. Her keel was laid on 24 August 1943. She was launched on 14 September and delivered on 22 September. Built for the WSA, she was operated under the management of Alaska Packers Association. Sold in 1946 to Compania Argentina di Navegaçion Dodero, Buenos Aires, Argentina and renamed Coracero. Renamed Arriero in 1948. Sold in 1951 to Flota Argentina de Navegaçion de Ultramar, Buenos Aires. Sold in 1961 to Empresa Lineas Maritimas Argentines, Buenos Aires. Sold in 1963 to Melteni Compania Navigation, Panama and renamed Akti. Re-registered to Liberia and operated under the management of Maritime Managers Co. Management transferred to Cape Shipping Ltd. in 1964. She caught fire and capsized at Europoort, Netherlands on 17 October 1965. She was scrapped at Hirao in October 1969.

== Louis Bamberger ==
Louis Bamberger was built by St. Johns River Shipbuilding Corporation. Her keel was laid on 28 October 1944. She was launched on 29 November and delivered on 8 December. Built for the WSA, she was operated under the management of Weyerhaeuser Steamship Co. Sold to her managers in 1947 and renamed Horace Irvine. Sold in 1968 to Reliance Carriers S.A. and renamed Reliance Amity. Re-registered to Panama and operated under the management of Hongkong Maritime Co. She was scrapped at Kaohsiung in April 1971.

== Louis C. Tiffany ==
Louis C. Tiffany was built by Bethlehem Fairfield Shipyard. Her keel was laid on 25 November 1943. She caught fire in December and burnt out and was consequently scrapped.

== Louis D. Brandeis ==
Louis D. Brandeis

Louis D. Brandeis was built by Bethlehem Fairfield Shipyard. Her keel was laid on 31 December 1942. She was launched on 20 February 1943 and delivered on 8 March. She was scrapped at Kearny in 1964.

== Louis Hennepin ==
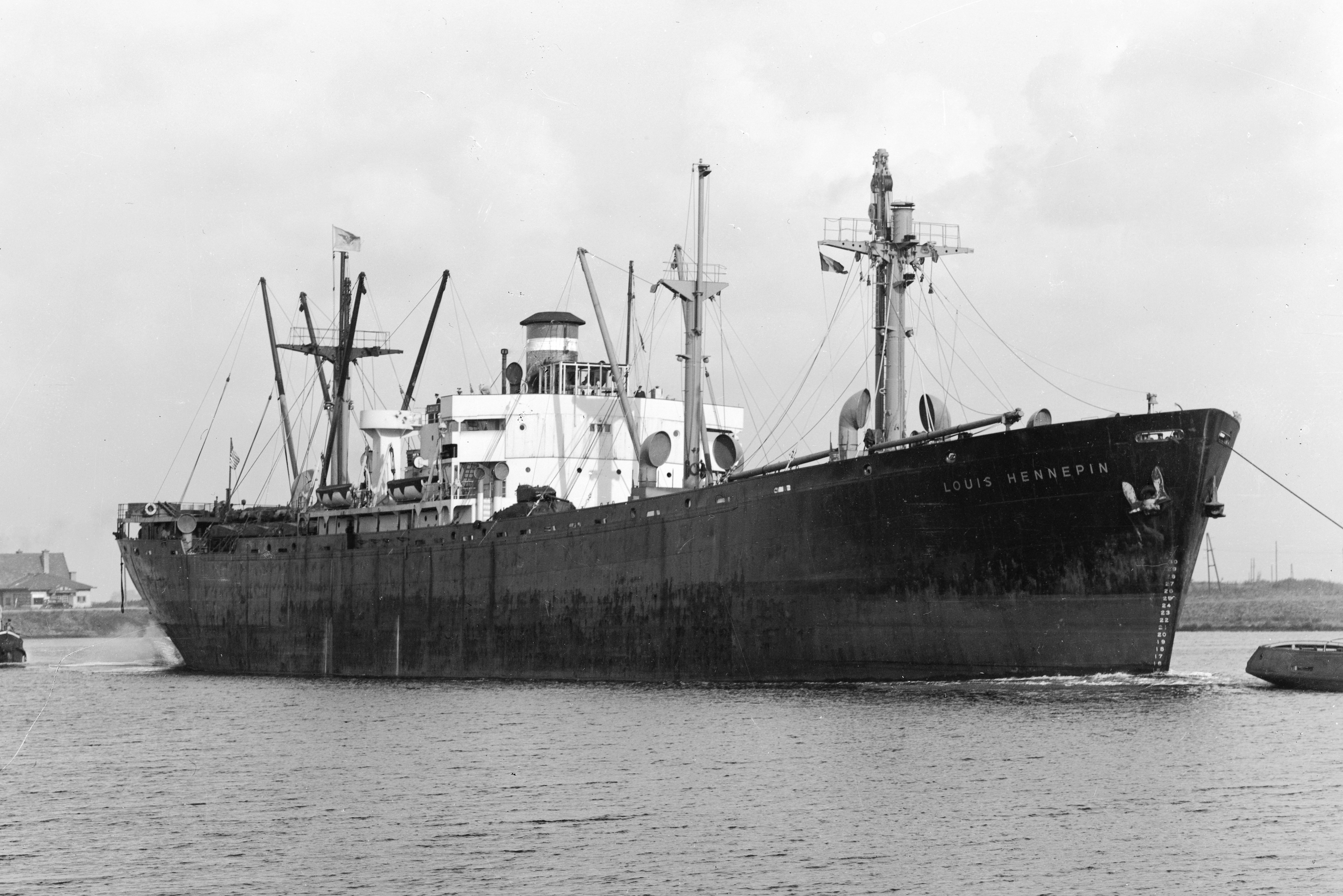
Louis Hennepin

Louis Hennepin was built by Permanente Metals Corporation. Her keel was laid on 30 March 1943. She was launched on 29 April and delivered on 14 May. She was scrapped at Tampa in April 1961.

== Louis Joliet ==
Louis Joliet was built by Permanente Metals Corporation. Her keel was laid on 2 December 1942. She was launched on 6 January 1943 and delivered on 16 January 1943. Built for the WSA, she was operated under the management of Seas Shipping Co. Sold in 1947 to Livanos Bros. Shipping Co. and renamed Aliki. Re-registered to Greece. Placed under the management of Economou & Co. in 1952. Sold in 1959 to Dernia Compania de Navigation, Panama and renamed Rio. Re-registered to Lebanon and operated under the management of Livanos & Sons. She was scrapped at Whampoa Dock, Hong Kong in October 1968.

== Louis Kossuth ==
Louis Kossuth was built by Bethlehem Fairfield Shipyard. Her keel was laid on 13 November 1943. She was launched on 4 December and delivered on 13 December. Built for the WSA, she was operated under the management of A. H. Bull & Co. She was scrapped at Baltimore in September 1959.

== Louis Marshall ==
Louis Marshall was built by Bethlehem Fairfield Shipyard. Her keel was laid on 15 June 1943. She was launched on 23 July and delivered on 30 July. Built for the WSA, she was operated under the management of Wessel, Duval & Co. Laid up at Wilmington, North Carolina in 1948. Sold in 1951 to Eastern Seaways Corp. and renamed Mount of Olives. Operated under the management of Orion Shipping & Trading Co. Renamed Seawizard in 1952. Renamed George M. Culucundis in 1953. Management transferred to Mar-Trade Corp. Management transferred to Tankship Management Corp. in 1954. Sold in 1956 to World Carriers Inc. and renamed Pacific Ocean. Operated under the management of World Tramping Agencies. Sold in 1957 to Transportation Utilities Inc. Operated under the management of Phs. van Ommeren Shipping Inc. Management transferred to World Tramping Agencies in 1958. Sold in 1960 to John G. P. Livanos, Piraeus and renamed Maria G. L. Sold in 1962 to Elshippier Inc. Remaining under the Greek flag and operated under the management of Ceres Hellenic Shipping Enterprises. She ran aground 30 nautical miles (56 km) south of Yokohama (34°33′N 139°49′E) on 15 March 1964 whilst on a voyage from Los Angeles to Chiba, Japan. She broke in two and sank.

== Louis McLane ==
Louis McLane was built by California Shipbuilding Corporation. Her keel was laid on 16 November 1942. She was launched on 17 December and delivered on 31 December. She was scrapped at New Orleans in 1966.

== Louis Pasteur ==
Louis Pasteur was built by Permanente Metals Corporation. Her keel was laid on 30 October 1943. She was launched on 23 November and delivered on 4 December. Built for the WSA, she was operated under the management of Agwilines Inc. Sold in 1947 to Società Raffaele Romano e Pasquale Mazzella, Naples. Sold in 1963 to Compania Armatoriale Italiana, Venice and renamed Stella Azzurra. Operated under the management of W. Runciman & Co. She arrived at La Spezia for scrapping in November 1967.

== Louis Sloss ==
Louis Sloss was built by Permanente Metals Corporation. Her keel was laid on 10 March 1944. She was launched on 3 April and delivered on 10 April. Laid up at Beaumont post-war, she was scrapped at Brownsville, Texas in December 1971.

== Louis Sullivan ==
Louis Sullivan was built by Permanente Metals Corporation. Her keel was laid on 14 March 1944. She was launched on 5 April and delivered on 13 April. She was scrapped at Mobile in January 1970.

== Louis Weule ==
Louis Weule was built by Permanente Metals Corporation. Her keel was laid on 26 February 1944. She was launched on 20 March and delivered on 25 March. She was scrapped at Portland, Oregon in July 1967.

== Lucien B. Maxwell ==
Lucien B. Maxwell was built by Todd Houston Shipbuilding Corporation. Her keel was laid on 7 September 1943. She was launched on 23 October and delivered on 6 November. She ran aground in the Seine Estuary on 6 August 1945 whilst on a voyage from New Orleans to Le Havre and Rouen, France. She broke in two and settled into quicksands. Salvage was abandoned and she was declared a total loss.

== Lucien Labaudt ==
Lucien Labaudt was built by Permanente Metals Corporation. Her keel was laid on 17 March 1944. She was launched on 7 April and delivered on 14 April. Built for the WSA, she was operated under the management of Pacific-Atlantic Steamship Co. Sold to States Steamship Co, Vancouver, Washington in 1946. Renamed California in 1947. Sold in 1949 to Universal Cargo Carriers Corp. and renamed Pacificus. Operated under the management of Orion Shipping & Trading Corp. Sold in 1953 to Pacificus Steamship Co., Wilmington, Delaware. Operated under the management of Suwannee Steamship Co. Sold in 1956 to Universal Cargo Carriers Corp. Operated under the management of Orion Shipping & Trading Co. Sold in 1957 to Intercontinental Liberties Inc. Operated under the management of Maritime Overseas Corp. Management transferred to Orion Shipping & Trading Co. in 1960. Sold in 1962 to Conqueror Freighters Inc. and renamed Smith Conqueror. Operated under the management of Earl J. Smith & Co. Renamed U.S. Conqueror in 1965 and placed under the management of U.S. Bulk Carriers Inc. Sold in 1967 to Compania Marietta Navigation, Hong Kong & Panama and renamed Marietta. Re-registered to Panama. She was scrapped at Kaohsiung in September 1969.

== Lucius Fairchild ==
Lucius Fairchild was built by Oregon Shipbuilding Corporation. Her keel was laid on 18 October 1943. She was launched on 6 November and delivered on 16 November. Built for the WSA, she was operated under the management of Wilmore Steamship Co. Management transferred to W. J. Rountree & Co. in 1946. To the Dutch Government in 1947 and renamed Berlage. Operated under the management of Koninklijke Java-China-Paket Lijnen. Sold in 1950 to Amsterdam N.V. Reederij, Amsterdam and renamed Amstelvaart. Sold in 1960 to Cosmopolitan Navigation Co. and renamed Cosmopolitan. Re-registered to Panama and operated under the management of Great Southern Steamship Co. Sold in 1964 to Vigilant Navigation Corp. and renamed Vigilant. Operated under the management of Union Marine Industries. She was scrapped at Kaohsiung in 1968.

== Lucius Q. C. Lamar ==
Lucius Q. C. Lamar was built by Delta Shipbuilding Company. Her keel was laid on 25 January 1943. She was launched on 6 March and delivered on 26 March. She was scrapped at Tacoma in April 1967. She was named after confederate solfier, politician and Supreme Court Justice Lucius Quintus Cincinnatus Lamar.

== Lucretia Mott ==
Lucretia Mott was built by Oregon Shipbuilding Corporation. Her keel was laid on 20 February 1943. She was launched on 13 March and delivered on 22 March. She was scrapped at Kearny in October 1968.

== Lucy Stone ==
Lucy Stone was built by Permanente Metals Corporation. Her keel was laid on 13 February 1943. She was launched on 13 March and delivered on 26 March. Laid up at Mobile post-war, she was scrapped at Brownsville in October 1972.

== Luis Arguello ==
Luis Arguello was built by California Shipbuilding Corporation. Her keel was laid on 5 November 1942. She was launched on 9 December and delivered on 27 December. She was scrapped at Kure, Japan in October 1960.

== Luna ==
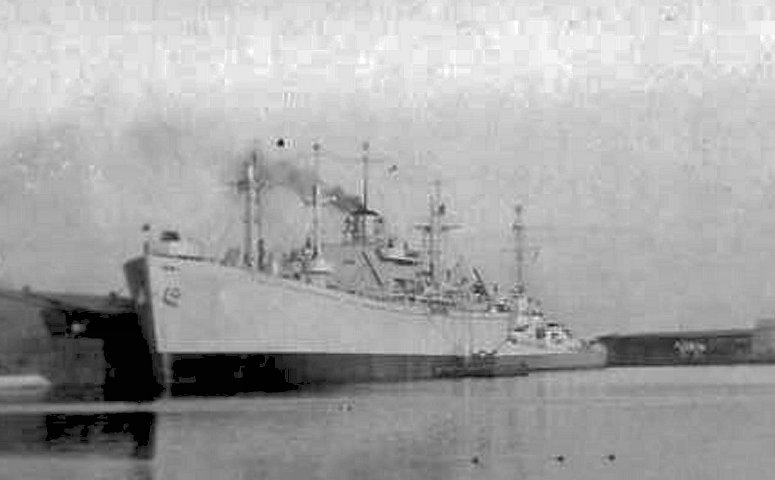
USS Luna

Luna was built by J. A. Jones Construction Company, Panama City. Her keel was laid on 23 April 1943. She was launched as Harriet Hosmer on 30 September and delivered to the United States Navy as Luna on 25 October. Converted for naval use by Tampa Shipbuilding Company, Tampa, Florida. Laid up in reserve at Pearl Harbor, Hawaii in April 1947. Towed to San Francisco in May 1947. Returned to WSA and renamed Harriet Hosmer. Laid up in Suisun Bay. She was scrapped at Richmond in May 1965.

== Lunsford Richardson ==
Lunsford Richardson was built by J. A. Jones Construction Company, Brunswick. Her keel was laid on 2 August 1944. She was launched on 9 September and delivered on 22 September. Built for the WSA, she was operated under the management of W. J. Rountree & Co. Inc. She was scrapped at Philadelphia in 1961.

== Luther Burbank ==
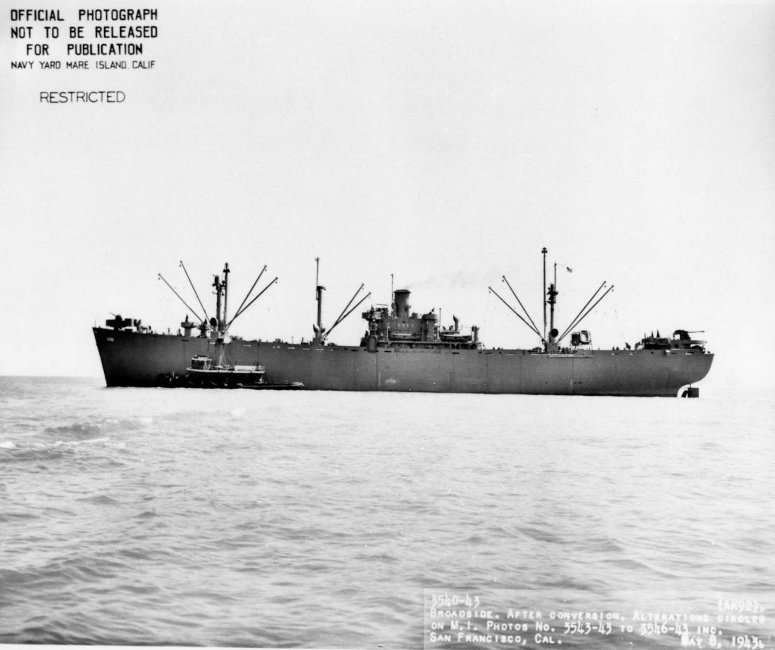
USS Eridanus

Luther Burbank was built by Permanente Metals Corporation. Her keel was laid on 12 March 1943. She was launched on 9 April and delivered on 22 April. To the United States Navy and renamed Eridanus. Returned to WSA in May 1946 and renamed Luther Burbank. Laid up in reserve. Sold in 1947 to John G. P. Livanos, Athens and renamed Panagiotis. She ran aground at Kunsan, South Korea on 15 November 1955 whilst on a voyage from Baltimore to Inchon, South Korea. She broke in two on 21 November and was declared a constructive total loss. Both parts were refloated in 1956 and towed to Pusan, then Shimonoseki, Japan. They were rejoined at Tokyo in 1957 and she was lengthened to 448 feet 6 inches (136.70 m). Now assessed at 7,321 GRT and renamed Silla. Sold to Far Eastern Maritime Transport Co., Inchon. Placed under the management of Pacific Far East Line in 1961. She was scrapped at Masan, South Korea in September 1972.

== Luther Martin ==
Luther Martin was built by Bethlehem Fairfield Shipyard. Her keel was laid on 8 May 1942. She was launched on 4 July and delivered on 21 July. Laid up at Mobile post-war, she was scrapped at Panama City, Florida in November 1971.

== Luther S. Kelly ==
Luther S. Kelly was built by Permanente Metals Corporation. Her keel was laid on 23 June 1943. She was launched on 14 July and delivered on 24 July. Built for the WSA, she was operated under the management of W. S. Chamberlain & Co. Management transferred to Dichmann, Wright & Pugh in 1946. Sold in 1946 to Achille Lauro, Naples and renamed Gioacchino Lauro. She was scrapped at La Spezia in December 1968.

== Luzon ==
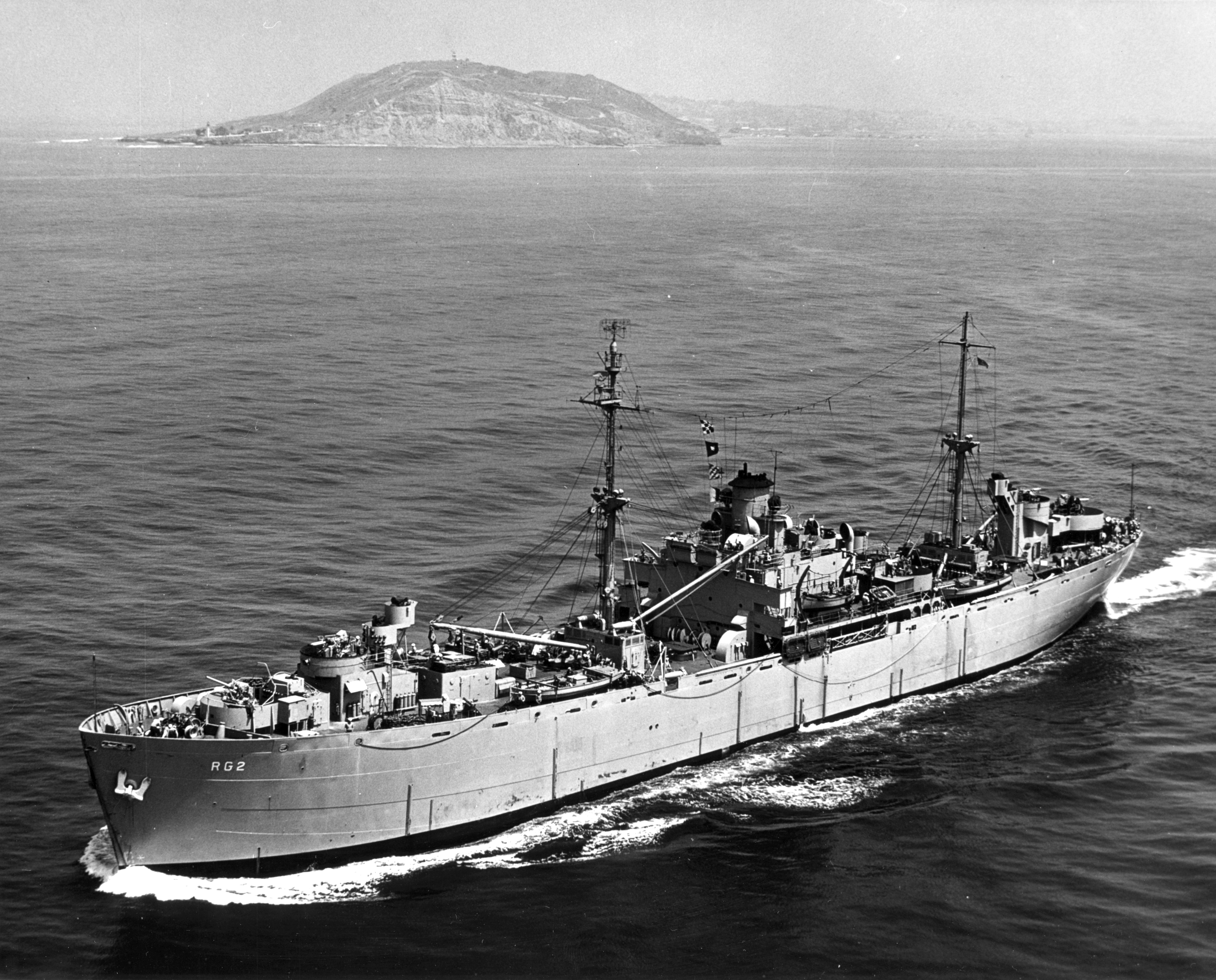
USS Luzon

Luzon was built by Bethlehem Fairfield Shipyard. Her keel was laid on 8 April 1943. She was launched as Samuel Bowles on 14 May and delivered to the United States Navy as Luzon on 24 May. Laid up in reserve at Orange in June 1947. Recommissioned in September 1950. Laid up in reserve in April 1955. Recommissioned in November 1955. Laid up in reserve in Suisun Bay in July 1960. She was sold to South Korean shipbreakers in August 1974.

== Lydia M. Child ==
Lydia M. Child was built by California Shipbuilding Corporation. Her keel was laid on 31 January 1943. She was launched on 28 February and delivered on 17 March. Built for the WSA, she was operated under the management of McCormick Steamship Co. She was torpedoed and sunk by Japanese submarine I-178 off Newcastle, Australia (33°08′S 153°24′E) on 27 April 1943 whilst on a voyage from San Francisco to Suez, Egypt.

== Lyman Abbott ==
Lyman Abbott was built by Walsh-Kaiser Company. Her keel was laid on 28 November 1942. She was launched on 22 April 1943 and delivered on 22 May. Built for the WSA, she was operated under the management of International Freighting Corp. Laid up at Mobile post-war, she was scrapped there in March 1970.

== Lyman Beecher ==
Lyman Beecher was built by Marinship Corporation, Sausalito, California. Her keel was laid on 27 September 1942. She was launched on 26 November and delivered on 31 December. Built for the WSA, she was operated under the management of American-Hawaiian Steamship Co. To the United States War Department in 1946. Lent to the Chinese Government and renamed Hai Chen. Operated under the management of China Merchants Steam Navigation Co. Sold to her managers in 1947. Sold in 1951 to Panocean Society Armamente, Panama and renamed Asian. Operated under the management of A. Lusi Ltd. Re-registered to Greece in 1960. Management transferred to J. C. Carras & Sons in 1965. She was scrapped at Kaohsiung in November 1967.

== Lyman Hall ==
Lyman Hall was built by Southeastern Shipbuilding Corporation. Her keel was laid on 23 June 1942. She was launched on 6 February 1943 and delivered on 9 April. She was scrapped at Philadelphia in October 1963.

== Lyman J. Gage ==
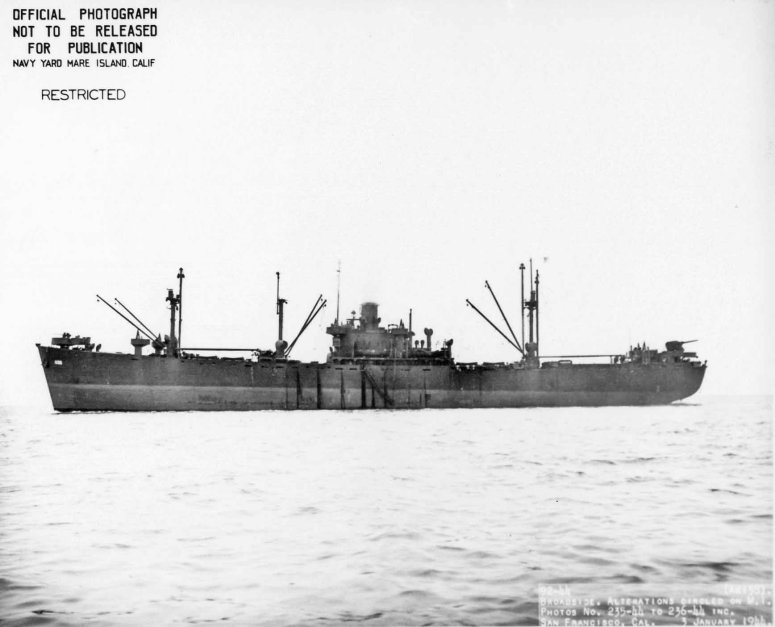
USS Cheleb

Lyman J. Gage was built by Permanente Metals Corporation. Her keel was laid on 29 December 1942. She was launched on 29 January 1943 and delivered on 6 February. To the United States Navy in January 1944 and renamed Cheleb. Decommissioned at Pearl Harbor in July 1946, subsequently used in testing explosives before being returned to the USMC. Laid up in Suisun Bay. She was sold to shipbreakers in San Jose, California for scrapping in December 1978.

== Lyman Stewart ==
Lyman Stewart was built by California Shipbuilding Corporation. Her keel was laid on 27 April 1943. She was launched on 20 May and delivered on 31 May. Built for the WSA, she was operated under the management of Pacific Far East Line. She was scrapped at Panama City, Florida in April 1970.

== Lynx ==
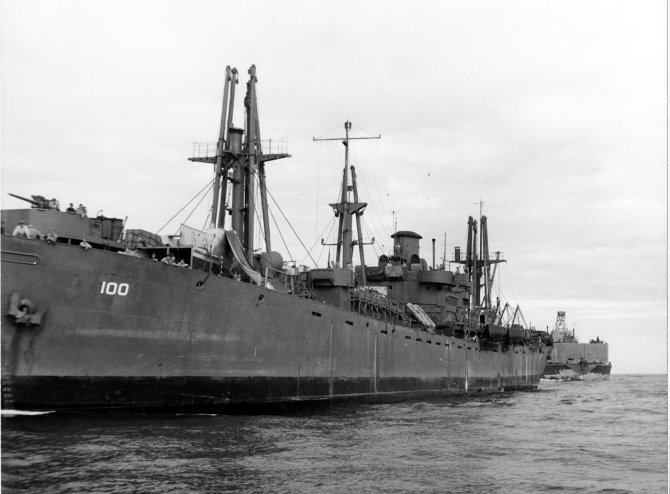
USS Lynx

Lynx was built by California Shipbuilding Corporation. Her keel was laid on 26 April 1943. She was launched as Juan Bautista de Anza on 18 May and delivered to the United States Navy as Lynx on 30 May. Returned to the WSA in November 1945 and renamed Juan Bautista de Anza. Laid up in Suisun Bay. She was scrapped at Portland, Oregon in November 1972.

== Lyra ==
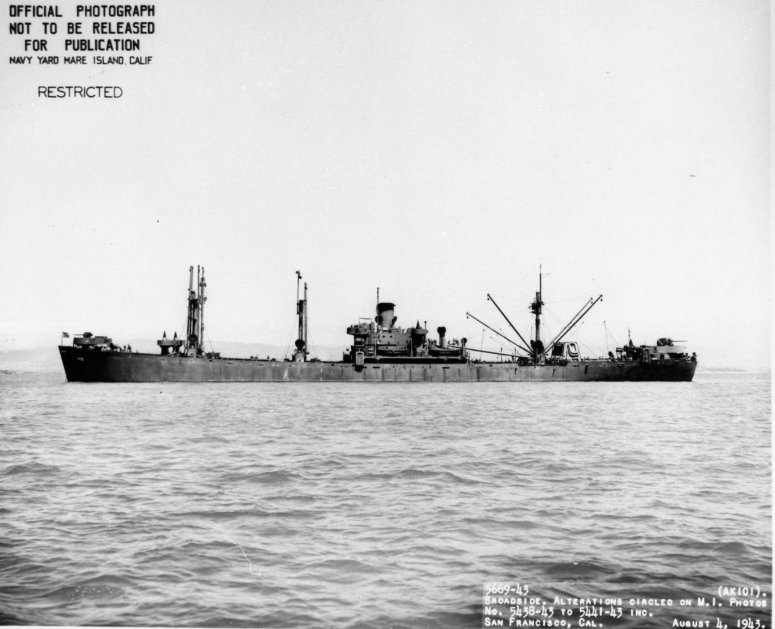
USS Lyra

Lyra was built by Permanente Metals Corporation. Her keel was laid on 25 April 1943. She was launched as Cyrus Hamlin on 24 May and delivered to the United States Navy as Lyra on 10 June. Returned to WSA in 1946 and renamed Cyrus Hamlin. Sold in 1947 to A. G. Pappadikis, Piraeus, Greece and renamed Virginia. Sold in 1964 to Marfrontera Compania Navigation, Panama and renamed Amedeo. Remaining under the Greek flag and operated under the management of Carapanayoti Ltd. She was scrapped at Kaohsiung in April 1967.

== Lyon G. Tyler ==
Lyon G. Tyler was built by Bethlehem Fairfield Shipyard. Her keel was laid on 12 September 1943. She was launched as Lyon G. Tyler on 10 October and delivered as Samnebra on 18 October. To the MoWT under Lend-Lease. Operated under the management of Cayzer, Irvinen & Co. Sold in 1947 to Chellew Navigation Co. and renamed Pentire. Operated under the management of F. C. Perman. Management transferred to Baden H. Roberts in 1948. Sold in 1955 to Gaviota Compania de Navigation, Panama and renamed Cuaco. Sold in 1959 to Compania di Navigazione Gaviota, Lugano, remaining under the Panamanian flag. She was scrapped at Hirao in June 1963.
