= Lewis Cass =

United States Army officer and politician (1782–1866)

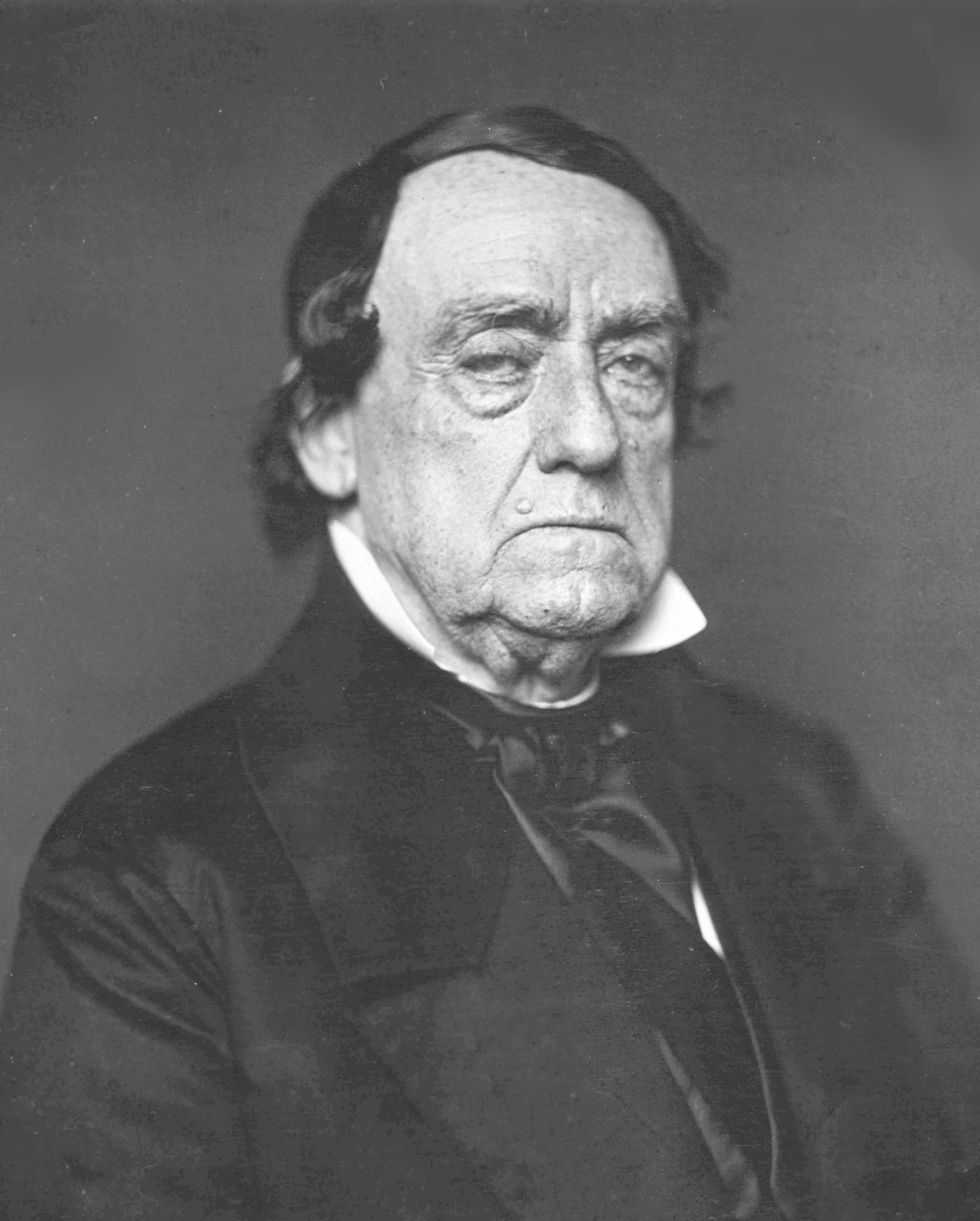
- Cass in 1855

22nd United States Secretary of State
- In office March 6, 1857 – December 14, 1860
- President: James Buchanan
- Preceded by: William L. Marcy
- Succeeded by: Jeremiah S. Black

President pro tempore of the United States Senate
- In office December 4, 1854 – December 5, 1854
- Preceded by: David Rice Atchison
- Succeeded by: Jesse D. Bright

United States Senator from Michigan
- In office March 4, 1849 – March 3, 1857
- Preceded by: Thomas Fitzgerald
- Succeeded by: Zachariah Chandler
- In office March 4, 1845 – May 29, 1848
- Preceded by: Augustus S. Porter
- Succeeded by: Thomas Fitzgerald

15th United States Minister to France
- In office December 1, 1836 – November 12, 1842
- President: Andrew Jackson; Martin Van Buren; William Henry Harrison; John Tyler
- Preceded by: Edward Livingston
- Succeeded by: William R. King

14th United States Secretary of War
- In office August 1, 1831 – October 4, 1836
- President: Andrew Jackson
- Preceded by: Roger B. Taney (Acting)
- Succeeded by: Joel Roberts Poinsett

2nd Governor of the Michigan Territory
- In office October 13, 1813 – August 1, 1831
- Appointed by: James Madison
- Preceded by: Henry Procter (British military governor)
- Succeeded by: George Bryan Porter

Member of the Ohio House of Representatives
- In office December 1, 1806 – December 6, 1807 Serving with William H. Puthuff and Levi Barber
- Preceded by: various
- Succeeded by: various
- Constituency: Washington, Gallia, Muskingum, and Athens counties

Personal details
- Born: October 9, 1782 Exeter, New Hampshire, U.S.
- Died: June 17, 1866 (aged 83) Detroit, Michigan, U.S.
- Party: Democratic
- Spouse: Eliza Spencer (m. 1806; died 1853)
- Children: 7

Military service
- Allegiance: United States
- Branch/service: United States Army
- Years of service: 1812–1814
- Rank: Brigadier General
- Unit: 27th U.S. Infantry
- Battles/wars: War of 1812: Detroit Campaign; Battle of River Canard; Battle of the Thames

Lewis Cass (October 9, 1782 – June 17, 1866) was a United States Army officer and politician. He represented Michigan in the United States Senate and served in the Cabinets of two U.S. Presidents, Andrew Jackson and James Buchanan. He was also the 1848 Democratic presidential nominee. A slave owner himself, he was a leading spokesman for the doctrine of popular sovereignty, which at the time held the idea that people in each U.S state should have the right to decide whether to permit slavery as a matter of states' rights.

Born in Exeter, New Hampshire, he attended Phillips Exeter Academy before establishing a legal practice in Zanesville, Ohio. After serving in the Ohio House of Representatives, he was appointed as a U.S. Marshal. Cass also joined the Freemasons and eventually co-founded the Grand Lodge of Michigan. He fought at the Battle of the Thames in the War of 1812 and was appointed to govern Michigan Territory in 1813. He negotiated treaties with American tribes to open land for American settlement as part of a belief in "manifest destiny" and led a survey expedition into the northwest part of the territory.

Cass resigned as governor in 1831 to accept appointment as Secretary of War under Andrew Jackson. As Secretary, he helped implement Jackson's policy of Indian removal. After serving as ambassador to France from 1836 to 1842, he unsuccessfully sought the presidential nomination at the 1844 Democratic National Convention; a deadlock between supporters of Cass and former President Martin Van Buren ended with the nomination of James K. Polk. In 1845, the Michigan Legislature elected Cass to the Senate, where he served until 1848. Cass's nomination for president at the 1848 Democratic National Convention precipitated a split in the party, as Cass's advocacy for popular sovereignty alienated the anti-slavery wing of the party. Van Buren led the Free Soil Party's presidential ticket and appealed to many anti-slavery Democrats, contributing to the victory of Whig nominee Zachary Taylor.

Cass returned to the Senate in 1849 and continued to serve until 1857 when he accepted appointment as United States Secretary of State. He unsuccessfully sought to buy land from Mexico and sympathized with pro-slavery American filibusters in Latin America. Cass resigned in December 1860 to protest Buchanan's handling of the threatened secession of several Southern states. Since his death in 1866, he has been commemorated in various ways, including a statue in the National Statuary Hall.

== Early life ==
Cass was born in Exeter, New Hampshire on October 9, 1782, near the end of the American Revolution. His parents were Molly (née Gilman) Cass and Major Jonathan Cass, a Revolutionary War veteran who fought at the Battle of Bunker Hill.

Cass was educated in Exeter and attended Phillips Exeter Academy. In 1800, the family moved to Marietta, Ohio, part of a wave of westward migration after the defeat of Native Americans led to the end of the Northwest Indian War. Cass studied law with Return J. Meigs Jr., was admitted to the bar, and began a practice in Zanesville.

== Beginning of Cass's career ==
In 1806, Cass was elected to the Ohio House of Representatives. The following year, President Thomas Jefferson appointed him U.S. Marshal for Ohio.

He joined the Freemasons, and was initiated as an Entered Apprentice in what was later American Union Lodge No.1 at Marietta on December 5, 1803. He achieved his Fellow Craft degree on April 2, 1804, and his Master Mason degree on May 7, 1804. On June 24, 1805, he was admitted as Charter member of the Lodge of Amity 105 (later No.5) in Zanesville. He served as the first Worshipful Master of the Lodge of Amity in 1806. Cass was one of the founders of the Grand Lodge of Ohio, representing the Lodge of Amity at the first meeting on January 4, 1808. He was elected Deputy Grand Master on January 5, 1809, and Grand Master on January 3, 1810, January 8, 1811, and January 8, 1812.

== War of 1812 ==
=== Engagement at bridge near Fort Malden ===
After the War of 1812 broke out, Cass took command of the 3rd Ohio Volunteer Regiment. During the war, Cass conducted several military operations around the Canada–United States border. On July 16, 1812, a British force consisting of the 41st Regiment of Foot, 60 men of the Canadian Militia and a number of Indians were posted near Fort Malden. Cass and Colonel James Miller led a concealed American reconnaissance force near them. The British detected the Americans, and sent a party of Indians over a nearby bridge to draw them out; however, once the Indians crossed, the concealed Americans opened fire, wounding two and killing one. Cass and Miller send word to General William Hull, requesting permission to attack Fort Malden and hold it until reinforcements arrived. However, Hull was unsupportive and refused their request, which led Cass and Miller to withdraw back to American lines.

=== Second engagement at bridge near Fort Malden ===
On July 19, 1812, Colonel Duncan McArthur led a reconnaissance force combined with 150 Ohio infantry troops under Cass were near the bridge leading to Fort Malden. Two British guns fired on the Americans and disabled an American cannon. The Americans captured two British soldiers after they crossed the bridge, before safely withdrawing with their prisoners.

=== Hit-and-run attack on bridge at the Riviere aux Canards ===
On July 28, 1812, Colonel Cass conducted a hit-and-run attack at the Rivière aux Canards driving back a band of Native Americans. The Americans killed one Native American and scalped him. Cass and his fellow Americans then withdrew safely.

=== Battle of the Thames ===
Cass became colonel of the 27th United States Infantry Regiment on February 20, 1813. Soon after, he was promoted to brigadier general in the Regular Army on March 12, 1813. Cass took part in the Battle of the Thames, which saw the death of Tecumseh. Cass resigned from the Army on May 1, 1814.

== Territorial Governor of Michigan ==
As a reward for his military service, Cass was appointed Governor of Michigan Territory by President James Madison on October 29, 1813, and he served until 1831. As he was frequently traveling on business, several territorial secretaries often acted as governor in his place. During this period, he helped negotiate and implement treaties with Native American tribes in Michigan, by which they ceded substantial amounts of land. Some were given small reservations in the territory.

In 1817, Cass was one of two commissioners (along with Duncan McArthur), who negotiated the Treaty of Fort Meigs, which was signed on September 29 with several Native American tribes of the region, under which they ceded large amounts of territory to the United States. This helped open up areas of Michigan to settlement by Euro-Americans. That same year, Cass was named to serve as Secretary of War under President James Monroe, but he declined.

In 1820, Cass led an expedition to the northwestern part of Michigan Territory, in the Great Lakes region in today's northern Minnesota. Its purpose was to map the region and locate the source of the Mississippi River. The headwater was then unknown, resulting in an undefined border between the United States and British North America, which had been linked to the river. The Cass expedition erroneously identified what became known as Cass Lake as the Mississippi's source. It was not until 1832 that Henry Rowe Schoolcraft, the Cass expedition's geologist, identified nearby Lake Itasca as the true headwater of the Mississippi.

Though the Northwest Ordinance of 1787 prohibited slavery in the Northwest Territory, which included what later became Michigan Territory, a small number of slaves continued to reside in Michigan until it achieved statehood. Despite his later claims to the contrary, as territorial governor, Cass is known to have owned at least one slave, a household servant, as evidenced by 1818 correspondence between him and Alexander Macomb. Slavery continued in Michigan until admission to the Union in 1837, when its first state constitution outlawed slavery statewide.

== Secretary of War and expediter of Indian removal ==
In 1830, Cass published an article in the North American Review that passionately argued that Indians were "inherently inferior" to whites, and incapable of being civilized and thus should be removed from the eastern United States. This article caught the attention and approval of Andrew Jackson. On August 1, 1831, Cass resigned as governor of the Michigan Territory to take the post of Secretary of War under President Andrew Jackson, a position he held until 1836. Cass was a central figure in implementing the Indian removal policy of the Jackson administration; Congress had passed the Indian Removal Act in 1830. While it was directed chiefly against the Southeastern tribes, especially the Five Civilized Tribes, it also affected tribes in Ohio, Illinois, and other areas east of the Mississippi River. Most were forced to Indian Territory in present-day Kansas and Oklahoma, but a number of bands negotiated being allowed to remain in Michigan.

== U.S. Minister to France ==
At the end of his term, President Jackson appointed Cass to succeed Edward Livingston as the U.S. Minister to France on October 4, 1836. He presented his credentials on December 1, 1836, and served until he left his post on November 12, 1842, when he was succeeded by William R. King, who later became the 13th Vice President of the United States under President Franklin Pierce.

== Presidential ambitions and U.S. Senate ==
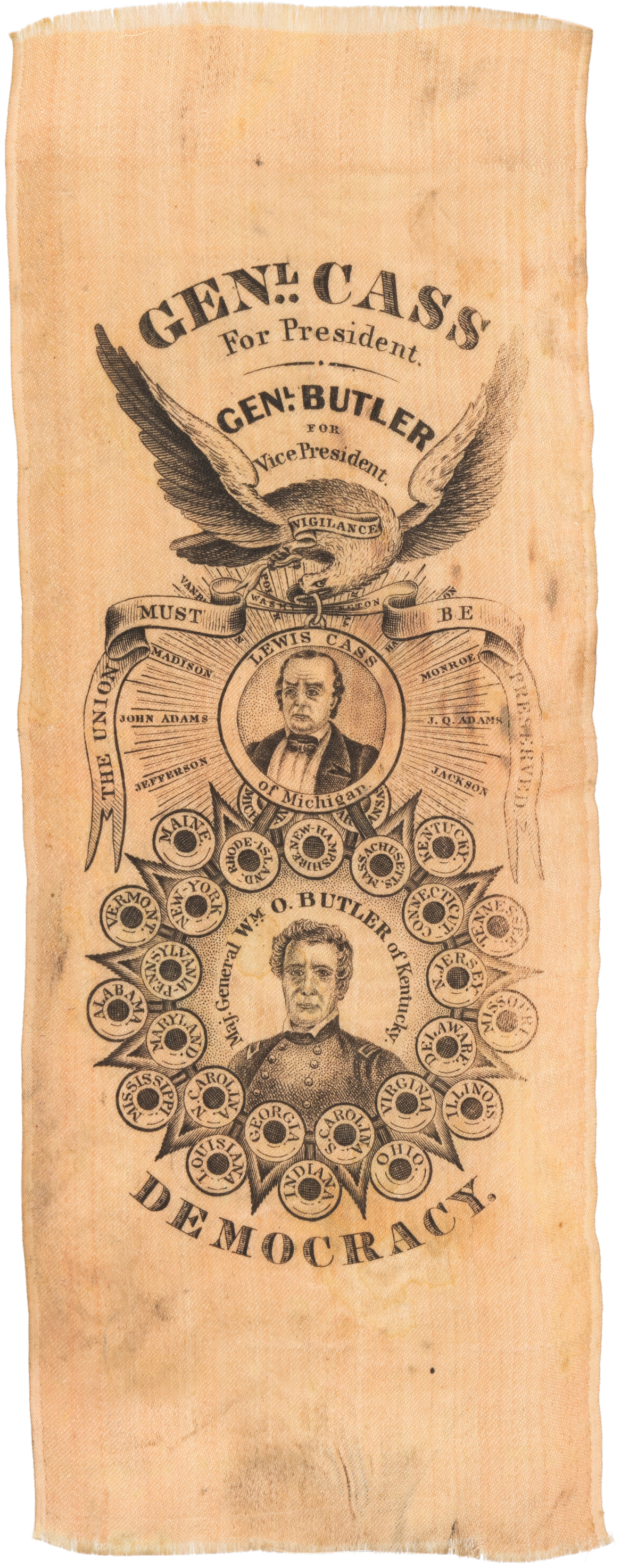
Cass & Butler 1848 Jugate Ribbon

In the 1844 Democratic convention, Cass stood as a candidate for the presidential nomination, losing on the ninth ballot to dark horse candidate James K. Polk.

Cass was elected by the state legislature to represent Michigan in the United States Senate, serving in 1845–1848. He served as chairman of the Committee on Military Affairs in the 30th Congress.

In 1848, he resigned from the Senate to run for president in the 1848 election. William Orlando Butler was selected as his running mate. Cass was a leading supporter of the doctrine of popular sovereignty, which held that the (white male) American citizens who lived in a territory should decide whether to permit slavery there. His nomination caused a split in the Democratic Party, leading many antislavery Northern Democrats to join the Free Soil Party, which nominated former President Martin Van Buren.

After losing the election to Zachary Taylor, Cass was returned by the state legislature to the Senate, serving from 1849 to 1857. He was the first non-incumbent Democratic presidential candidate to lose an election and the first Democrat who was unsuccessful in his bid to succeed another Democrat as president. Apart from James Buchanan's election to succeed Franklin Pierce in 1856, subsequent Democrats who attempted election to succeed a fellow Democrat as president all failed in their bid to do so. Cass made another bid for president in 1852 but neither he nor rival Democratic contenders Buchanan and Stephen Douglas secured a majority of delegates’ votes at the Democratic Convention in Baltimore, and the party went with Franklin Pierce instead.

== U.S. Secretary of State ==
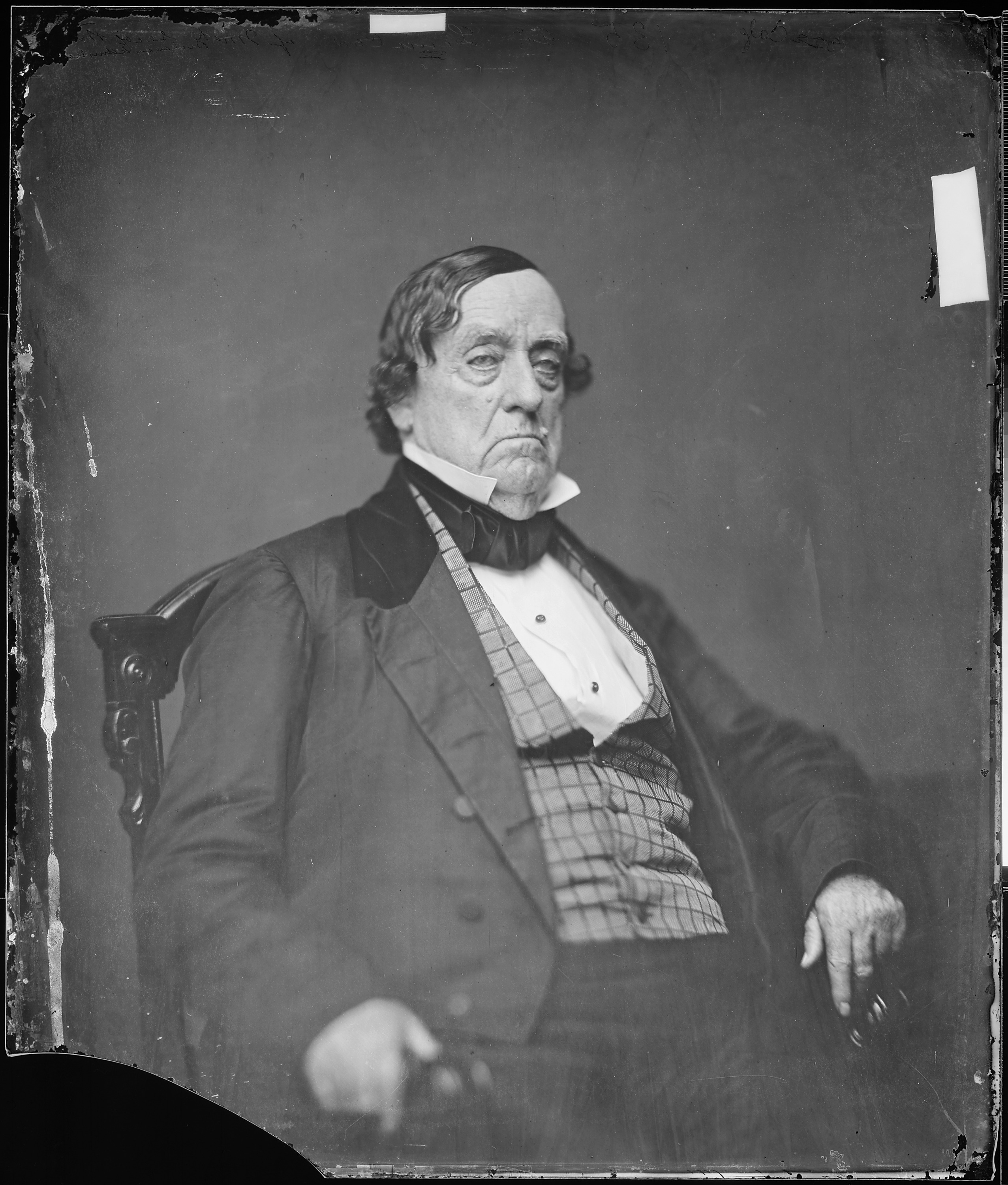
Photograph of Secretary Cass, by Mathew Brady, c. 1860–65

On March 6, 1857, President James Buchanan appointed Cass to serve as Secretary of State. Although retaining incumbent Secretary of State William L. Marcy was considered the best option by many, Buchanan made it clear that he did not want to keep anyone from the Pierce Administration. Moreover, Marcy had opposed his earlier presidential bids, and was in poor health in any event, and he died in July 1857. Cass, aged 75, was seen by most as too old for such a demanding position and was thought to likely be little more than a figurehead. Buchanan decided Cass was the best choice to avoid political infighting and sectional tensions and wrote wrote a flattering letter offering Cass the post. Cass, who was retiring from the Senate, was not eager to leave Washington, immediately accepted.

As Secretary, Cass promised to refrain from making anti-British remarks in public (having served in the War of 1812, Cass had a low opinion of London). Most assumed Cass was a temporary Secretary of State until a younger, more fit man could be found, however, he ultimately served for all but the final four months of Buchanan's administration. As expected, the aged Cass largely delegated major decision-making to subordinates, but eagerly signed his name on papers and dispatches penned by them.

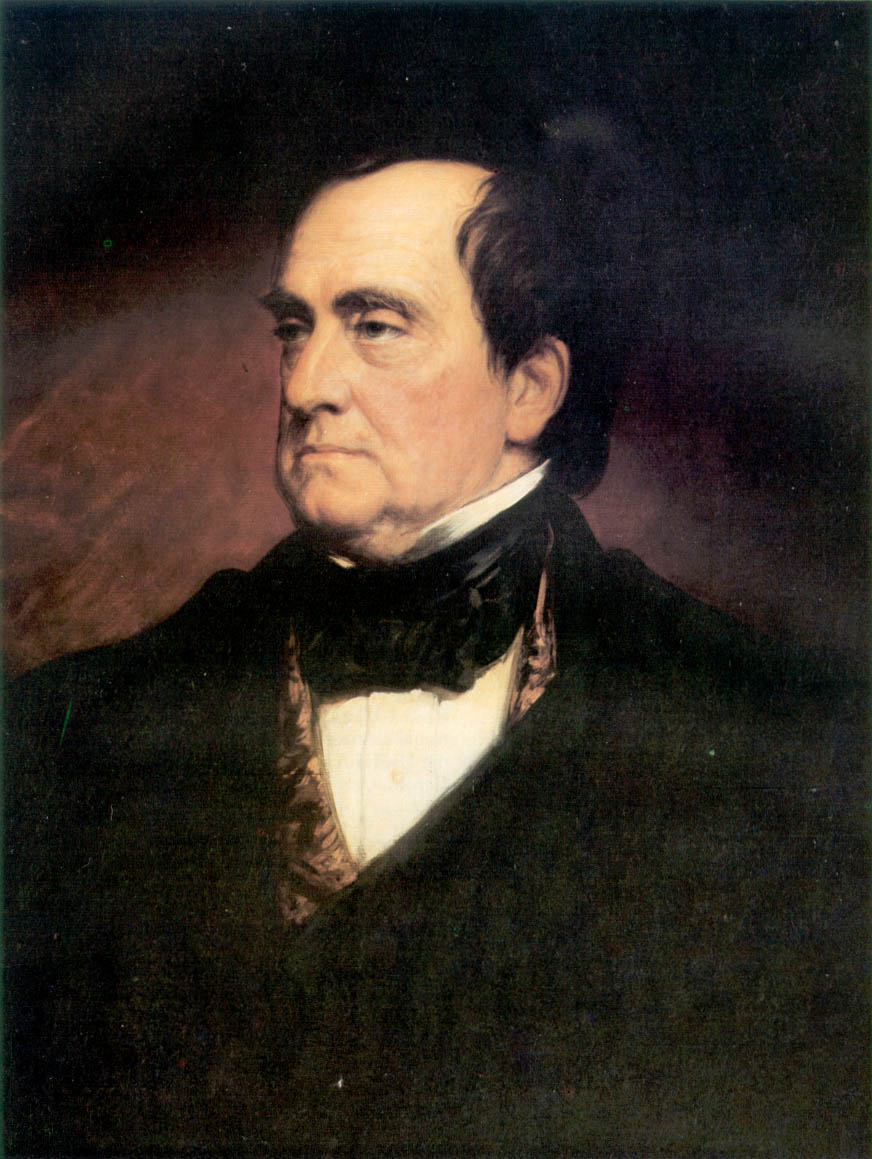
Posthumous portrait of Cass, by Daniel Huntington, c. 1873

Because he was sympathetic to pro-slavery American filibusters in Central America, Cass was instrumental in having Commodore Hiram Paulding removed from command after he landed Marines in Nicaragua and compelled the extradition of William Walker to the United States. Cass attempted to buy more land from Mexico, but faced opposition from both Mexico and congressional leaders. He also negotiated a final settlement to the Clayton–Bulwer Treaty, limiting U.S. and British control of Latin American countries. The chiefs of Raiatea and Tahaa in the South Pacific, refusing to accept the rule of King Tamatoa V, unsuccessfully petitioned the United States to accept the islands under a protectorate in June 1858.

Cass resigned on December 14, 1860, because of what he considered Buchanan's failure to protect federal interests in the South and failure to mobilize the federal military, actions that might have averted the threatened secession of Southern states.

== Personal life ==
On May 26, 1806, Cass married Elizabeth Spencer (1786–1853), the daughter of Dr. Joseph Spencer Jr. and Deborah (née Seldon) Spencer. Her paternal grandfather was Joseph Spencer, a Continental Congressman who was a major general in the Continental Army. Lewis and Elizabeth were the parents of seven children, five of whom lived past infancy:

- Isabella Cass (1805–1879), who married Theodorus Marinus Roest van Limburg, a Dutch journalist, diplomat, and politician.
- Elizabeth Selden Cass (1812–1832)
- Lewis Cass Jr. (1814–1878), who served as an army officer and as U.S. Chargé d'Affaires and Minister to the Papal States.
- Mary Sophia Cass (1812–1882), who married Army officer Augustus Canfield, an officer of the Corps of Topographical Engineers.
- Matilda Frances Cass (1818–1898), who married Henry Ledyard, the mayor of Detroit.
- Ellen Cass (1821–1824), who died young.
- Spencer Cass (1828-1828), who died in infancy.

Cass died on June 17, 1866, in Detroit, Michigan. He is buried in Elmwood Cemetery in Detroit.

=== Descendants ===
Through his daughter Mary, he was the great-grandfather of Cass Canfield (longtime president and chairman of Harper & Brothers, later Harper & Row).

Through his daughter Matilda, he was the grandfather of Elizabeth Cass Ledyard (wife of Francis Wayland Goddard); Henry Brockholst Ledyard Jr. (who was president of the Michigan Central Railroad); Susan Livingston Ledyard (wife of Hamilton Bullock Tompkins); Lewis Cass Ledyard (a prominent lawyer with Carter Ledyard & Milburn who was the personal counsel of J. Pierpont Morgan); and Matilda Spancer Ledyard.

Cass's great-great-grandson, Republican Thomas Cass Ballenger, represented North Carolina's 10th Congressional District from 1986 to 2005.

== Monuments and Commemoration ==
Lewis Cass Legacy Society logo

- A statue of Lewis Cass is one of the two that were submitted by Michigan to the National Statuary Hall collection in the U.S. Capitol in Washington, D.C. It stands in the National Statuary Hall room.
- The Liberty ship SS Lewis Cass
- He is the eponym of the village of Casstown, Ohio, the community of Cassville, West Virginia, Cassopolis, Michigan, and Cass County, Michigan, as well as Cass City, Michigan, and the Cass River that runs around the surrounding area.
- Cass Avenue in Detroit. Cass Avenue in Mt. Clemens.
- The Lewis Cass Legacy Society, which supports The Michigan Masonic Charitable Foundation, was named for his support of Michigan Freemasonry.
- Bartow County, Georgia, was originally named Cass County after Lewis Cass, but was changed in 1861 after Francis Bartow died as a Confederate war hero and due to Cass's alleged opposition to slavery, even though he was an advocate of states' rights via the doctrine of popular sovereignty. Cassville, Georgia is an unincorporated community in the same county, was originally the county seat before the name was changed from Cass County. The seat was moved to Cartersville, Georgia after General Sherman destroyed Cassville in his Atlanta Campaign of 1864.
- Cass Technical High School in Detroit, Cass High School in Bartow County, Georgia, Lewis Cass High School in Walton, Indiana, and Lewis Cass Elementary in Livonia, Michigan, were named in honor of Lewis Cass.
- The Lewis Cass Building, a principal state office building in the Lansing, Michigan capitol government complex. It was renamed on June 30, 2020, to the Elliott-Larsen Building.
- Lewis Cass is the namesake of counties in the following states: Indiana, Iowa, Minnesota, Missouri, Nebraska, Illinois, Michigan, and Texas. However, Cass County, North Dakota, was named for his nephew.
- Lewis Cass is the namesake of Cass Street in Green Bay, Wisconsin.
- Cass Street in Monroe, Michigan, was named in honor of Lewis Cass.
- Cass Street in Traverse City, Michigan, was named in honor of Lewis Cass.

== Other honors and memberships ==
- Elected a member of the American Antiquarian Society in 1820.
- Elected a member of the American Philosophical Society in 1826.

== Publications ==
- Lewis Cass. Inquiries: Respecting the History, Traditions, Language, Manners, Customs, Religion, &tc. of the Indians, Living within the United States. Detroit: Putnam Sheldon & Reed, 1823.
- Lewis Cass review of "Manners and Customs of several Indian Tribes, located west of the Mississippi by John D. Hunter [and] Historical Notes respecting the Indians of North America, by John Halkett, Esq., North American Review 22 (January 1826) pp. 53-119.
- Lewis Cass review of "Indian Treaties, and Laws and Regulations relating to Indian Affairs ... Compiled and published under Orders of the Department of War," North American Review 24 (April 1827), pp. 365–442.
- Lewis Cass review of "Travels in the Central Portions of the Mississippi Valley, by Henry R. Schoolcraft," North American Review 26 (April 1828,) pp. 357–403.
- Lewis Cass, "A Discourse Delivered at the First Meeting of the Historical Society of Michigan. September 18, 1829. Published at their Request. Detroit: Geo. L. Whitney, 1830. Reprinted as "Discourse" In Historical and scientific sketches of Michigan, comprising a series of discourses delivered before the Historical Society of Michigan, and Other Interesting Papers Relative to the Territory. (Detroit: Stephen Wells and George L. Whitney, 1834, pp. 5–50, including 4 pages of footnotes seemingly added for the 1834 reprinting.
- Lewis Cass review of "Documents and Proceedings relating to the Formation ... of a Board in the City of New York, for ... Improvement of the Aborigines of America," North America Review 30 (January 1830), pp. 62–121.
- Cass, Lewis (1840). France, its King, Court and Government. New York: Wiley and.

== See also ==
- Origins of the American Civil War

Political offices
Preceded by William Hull	Governor of Michigan; 1813–1831	Succeeded by George Bryan Porter
Preceded by Roger B. Taney; Acting	United States Secretary of War; 1831–1836	Succeeded by Joel Roberts Poinsett
Preceded by David Rice Aitchison	President pro tempore of the United States Senate; 1854	Succeeded by Jesse D. Bright
Preceded by William L. Marcy	United States Secretary of State; 1857–1860	Succeeded by Jeremiah S. Black
Diplomatic posts
Preceded by Edward Livingston	United States Minister to France; 1836–1842	Succeeded by William R. King
U.S. Senate
Preceded by Augustus S. Porter	U.S. Senator (Class 1) from Michigan; 1845–1848; Served alongside: William Woodbridge, Alpheus Felch	Succeeded by Thomas Fitzgerald
Preceded by Thomas Hart Benton	Chair of the Senate Armed Services Committee; 1847–1848	Succeeded by Thomas Hart Benton
Preceded by Thomas Fitzgerald	U.S. Senator (Class 1) from Michigan; 1849–1857; Served alongside: Alpheus Felch, Charles E. Stuart	Succeeded by Zachariah Chandler
Party political offices
Preceded by James K. Polk	Democratic nominee for President of the United States; 1848	Succeeded by Franklin Pierce
