= SS Louis D. Brandeis =

Liberty ship of WWII

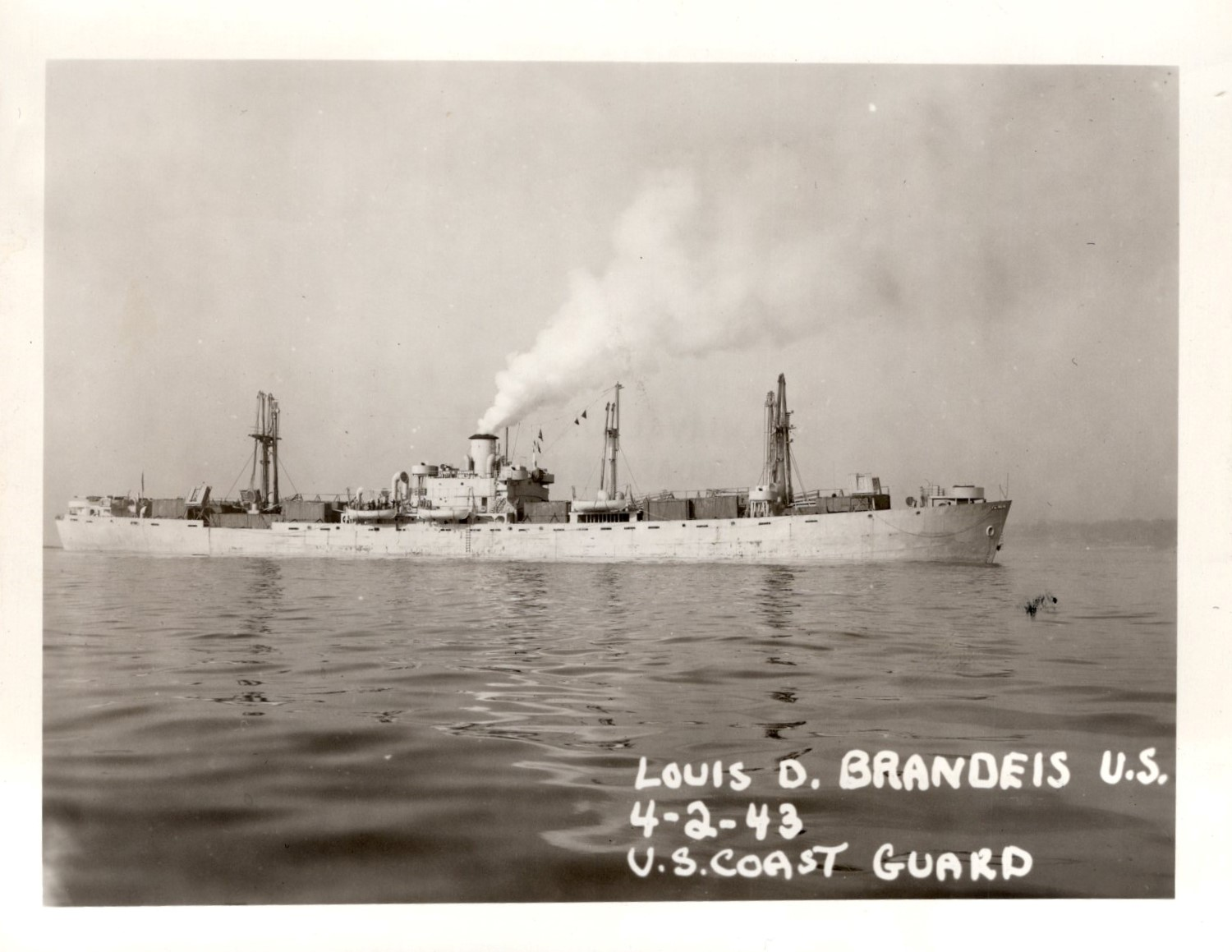
- Liberty ship Louis D. Brandeis, 3 April 1943

History

United States
- Name: Louis D. Brandeis
- Namesake: Louis D. Brandeis
- Owner: War Shipping Administration (WSA)
- Operator: Moore-McCormack Lines, Inc.
- Ordered: as type (EC2-S-C1) hull, MCE hull 943
- Awarded: 30 January 1942
- Builder: Bethlehem-Fairfield Shipyard, Baltimore, Maryland
- Cost: $1,071,791
- Yard number: 2093
- Way number: 12
- Laid down: 31 December 1942
- Launched: 20 February 1943
- Completed: 8 March 1943
- Identification: Call sign: KKAW
- Fate: Laid up in Reserve Fleet, 18 February 1948, sold for scrap, 30 October 1964

General characteristics
- Class & type: Liberty ship; type EC2-S-C1, standard
- Tonnage: 10,865 LT DWT; 7,176 GRT
- Displacement: 3,380 long tons (3,434 t) (light); 14,245 long tons (14,474 t) (max)
- Length: 441 feet 6 inches (135 m) oa; 416 feet (127 m) pp; 427 feet (130 m) lwl
- Beam: 57 feet (17 m)
- Draft: 27 ft 9.25 in (8.4646 m)
- Installed power: 2 × Oil fired 450 °F (232 °C) boilers, operating at 220 psi (1,500 kPa); 2,500 hp (1,900 kW)
- Propulsion: 1 × triple-expansion steam engine, (manufactured by Harrisburg Machinery Corp., Harrisburg, Pennsylvania); 1 × screw propeller
- Speed: 11.5 knots (21.3 km/h; 13.2 mph)
- Capacity: 562,608 cubic feet (15,931 m^{3}) (grain); 499,573 cubic feet (14,146 m^{3}) (bale)
- Complement: 38–62 USMM; 21–40 USNAG
- Armament: Varied by ship; Bow-mounted 3-inch (76 mm)/50-caliber gun; Stern-mounted 4-inch (102 mm)/50-caliber gun; 2–8 × single 20-millimeter (0.79 in) Oerlikon anti-aircraft (AA) cannons and/or, 2–8 × 37-millimeter (1.46 in) M1 AA guns

SS Louis D. Brandeis was a Liberty ship built in the United States during World War II. She was named after Louis D. Brandeis, an American lawyer who served as an associate justice of the Supreme Court of the United States from 1916 to 1939.

== Construction ==
Louis D. Brandeis was laid down on 31 December 1942, under a Maritime Commission (MARCOM) contract, MCE hull 943, by the Bethlehem-Fairfield Shipyard, Baltimore, Maryland; she was launched on 20 February 1943.

== History ==
She was allocated to the Moore-McCormack Lines, Inc., on 8 March 1943.

On 14 June 1946, she was laid up in the Wilmington Reserve Fleet, in Wilmington, North Carolina. On 30 October 1964, she was sold to Union Minerals & Alloys Corp., for $48,129.79, to be scrapped. She was withdrawn from the fleet on 10 January 1965.

== Bibliography ==
- "Bethlehem-Fairfield, Baltimore MD". www.ShipbuildingHistory.com. 7 August 2021.
- Maritime Administration. "Louis D. Brandeis". Ship History Database Vessel Status Card. U.S. Department of Transportation, Maritime Administration.
- Davies, James (May 2004). "Specifications (As-Built)" (PDF). p. 23.
- "SS Louis D. Brandeis".
