= USS Leopard =

American tanker

- USS Leopard, circa 1944

History

United States
- Laid down: October 5, 1943
- Launched: November 15, 1943
- Commissioned: December 26, 1943
- Decommissioned: June 21, 1946
- Stricken: July 3, 1946
- Fate: Disposed of by the WSA

General characteristics
- Displacement: 15,425 tons
- Length: 441 ft 6 in (134.57 m)
- Beam: 56 ft 11 in (17.35 m)
- Draft: 27 ft 9 in (8.46 m)
- Speed: 11 knots
- Complement: 97 officers and men
- Armament: 1 × 5-inch 38 caliber dual-purpose gun; 1 × 3 in (76 mm) gun; 8 × 20 mm cannons

USS Leopard (IX-122), an Armadillo-class tanker designated an unclassified miscellaneous vessel, was a United States Navy ship named for the leopard, a large and ferocious spotted cat of southern Asia and Africa. Her keel was laid down as William B. Bankhead on October 5, 1943, by Delta Shipbuilding Company, in New Orleans, Louisiana, under a Maritime Commission contract (T. Z-ET1-S-C3). She was renamed Leopard on October 27, 1943, launched on November 15, 1943, sponsored by Mrs. William B. Bankhead, acquired by the Navy December 24, 1943, and commissioned on December 26, 1943.

Originally designed to carry dry cargo, Leopard was converted to a tanker, and departed Key West, Florida, on January 18, 1944, for the southwest Pacific. Arriving Bora Bora, Society Islands on February 27, she performed harbor fueling operations out of Australia and New Guinea until mid-April when she sailed for the Admiralty Islands. For the rest of the war, Leopard continued harbor fueling duties in the vicinity of New Guinea.

Following V-J Day, the tanker departed Seeadler Harbor on August 30, 1945, and arrived Manila Bay on 9 September where she performed similar services. Leopard remained in the Philippines until she sailed for the United States on March 19, 1946, arriving Norfolk, Virginia, on May 11. She decommissioned there June 21, 1946 and was delivered to the War Shipping Administration the same day for disposal. Her name was struck from the Naval Vessel Register on July 3, 1946.
