= George Champlin Mason Sr. =

American architect (1820–1894)

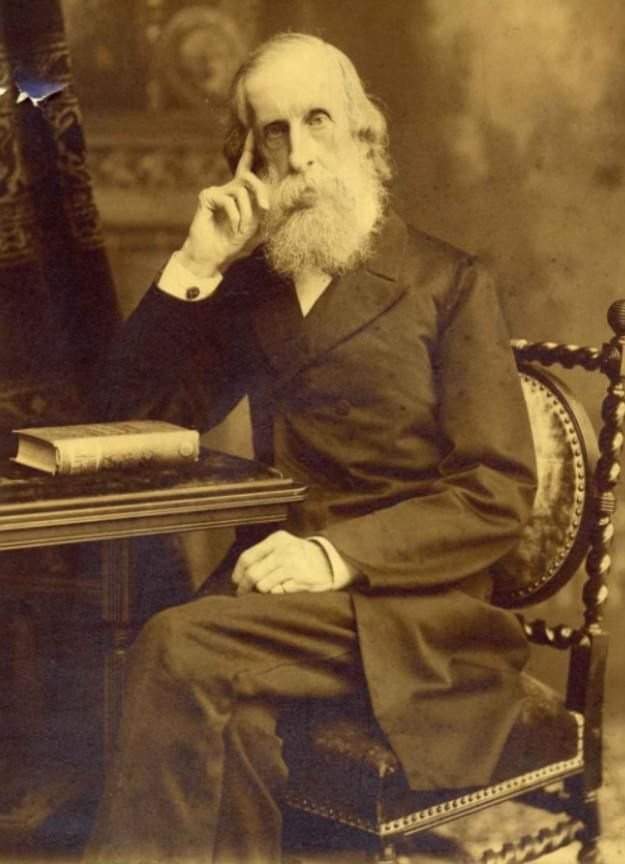
- Born: July 17, 1820; Newport, Rhode Island, U.S.
- Died: January 30, 1894 (aged 73); Philadelphia, Pennsylvania, U.S.
- Occupation: Architect
- Spouse: Frances Elizabeth Dean
- Children: George Champlin Mason Jr.
- Practice: George C. Mason & Son
- Buildings: Chepstow; Elm Court; Eisenhower House; Luce Hall

George Champlin Mason Sr. (1820-1894) was an American architect who built a number of mansions in Newport, Rhode Island, during the Gilded Age. He helped to found the Newport Historical Society as well.

== Early life and education ==
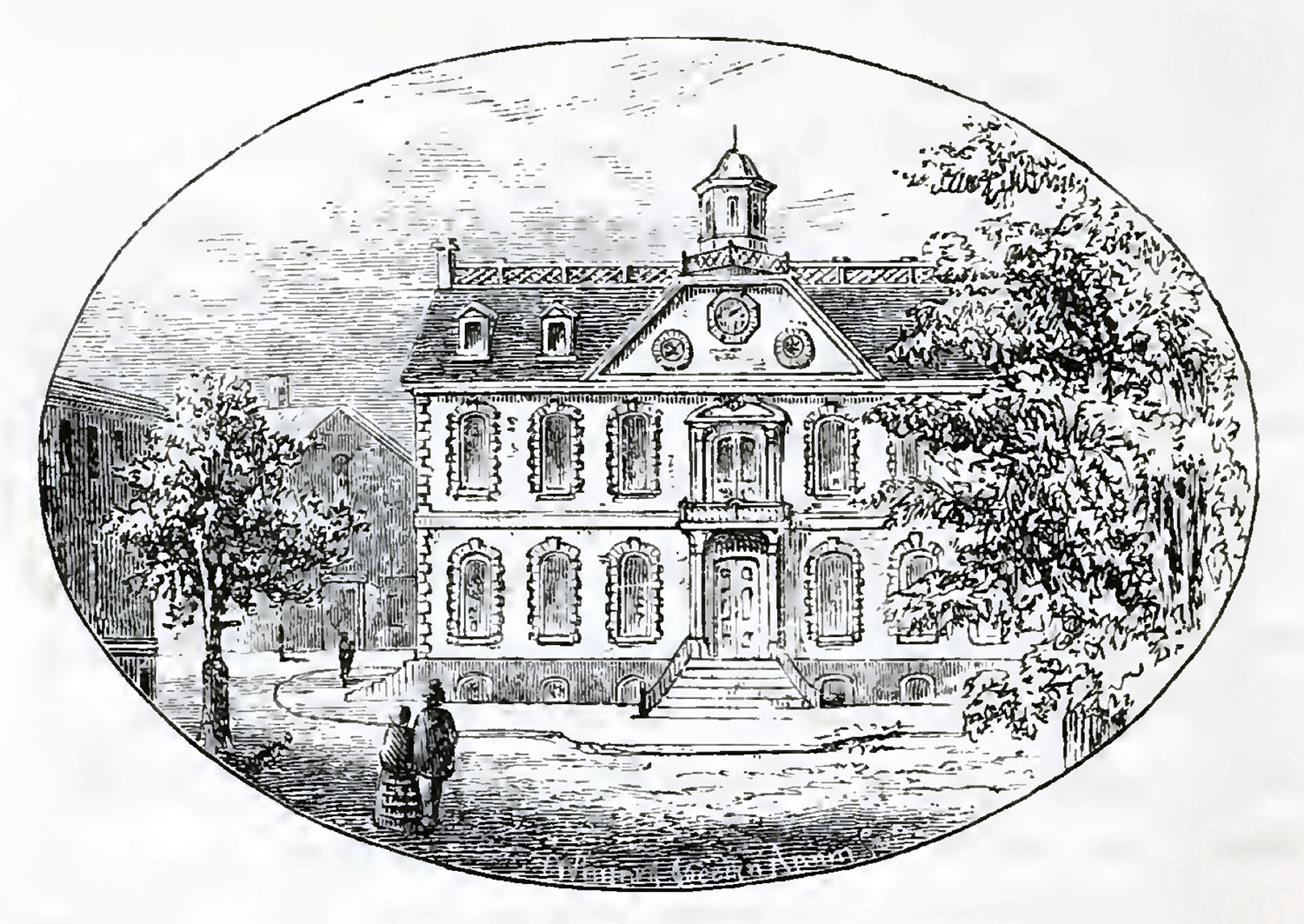
Drawing by George Champlin Mason Sr. of former Rhode Island State House, today known as Old Colony House. From Newport Illustrated, 1854.

George Champlin Mason was born to George Champlin Mason and Abigail Mumford Mason in Newport, Rhode Island in 1820. The Masons were a prominent New England family; his great-uncle Christopher G. Champlin was a U.S. Senator, and his aunt Elizabeth was married to Commodore Oliver Hazard Perry. After his early schooling in Newport, he moved to New York at the age of 15, where he worked in a dry goods establishment for six years. He left because of poor health and not long afterwards went to Europe to study art in Rome, Paris, and Florence, specializing in landscape paintings. He returned to the United States in 1846 and two years later married Frances Elizabeth Dean. Their son, George Champlin Mason Jr. (who would also become an architect), was born in 1849.

Mason spent the 1840s trying unsuccessfully to make a living as landscape painter in a Romantic pastoral style derived from the Hudson River School. During this period, he published Newport and Its Environs, a collection of 11 engravings of his landscape views of Newport that is one of the earliest books about Newport to showcase its potential as a vacation destination. It was noted as volume 1, but no further volumes ever materialized.

== Architectural career ==
=== Architectural writings ===
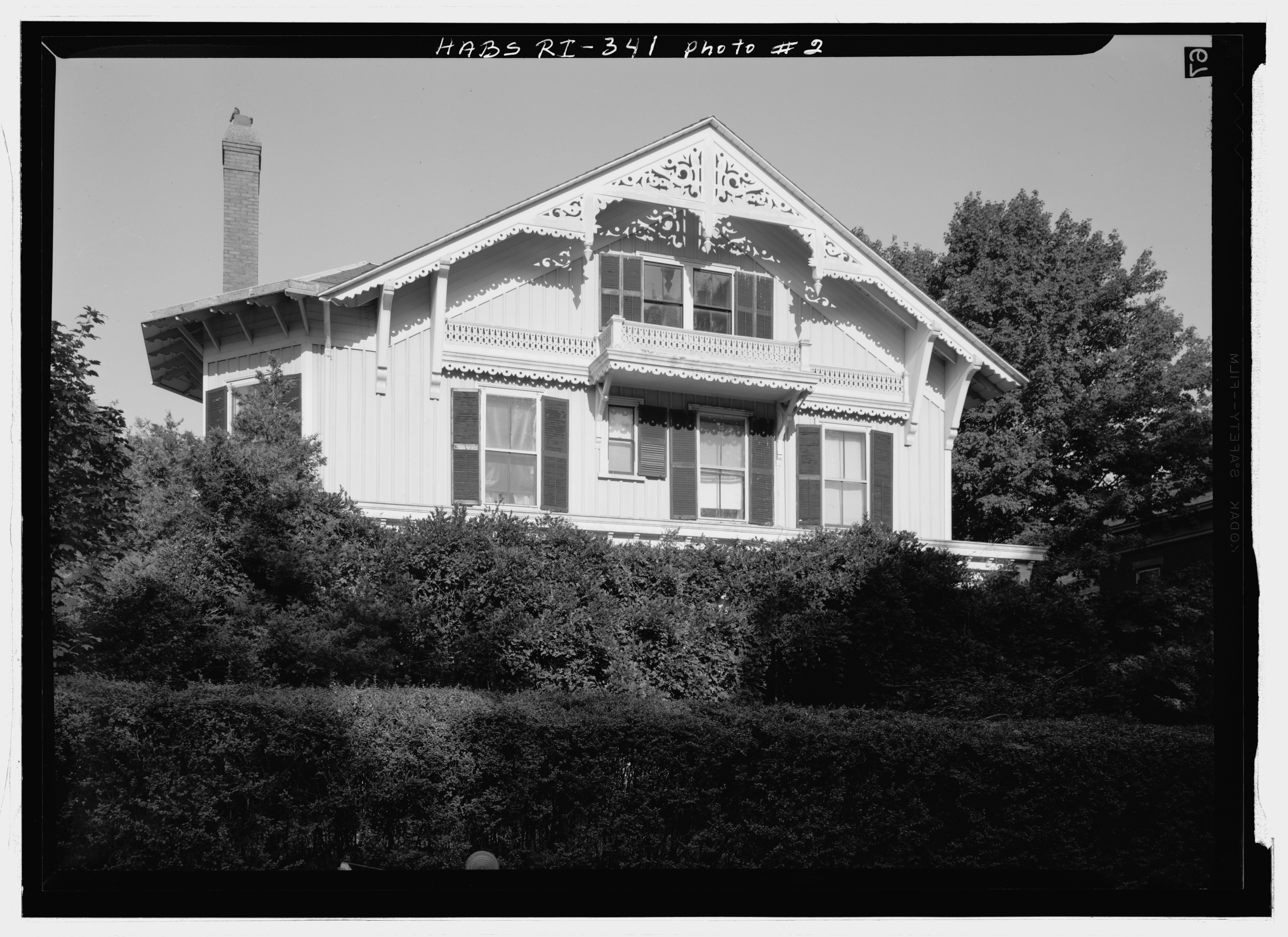
Front view of the house George Champlin Mason Sr. designed for himself in Newport, R.I. (now an inn).

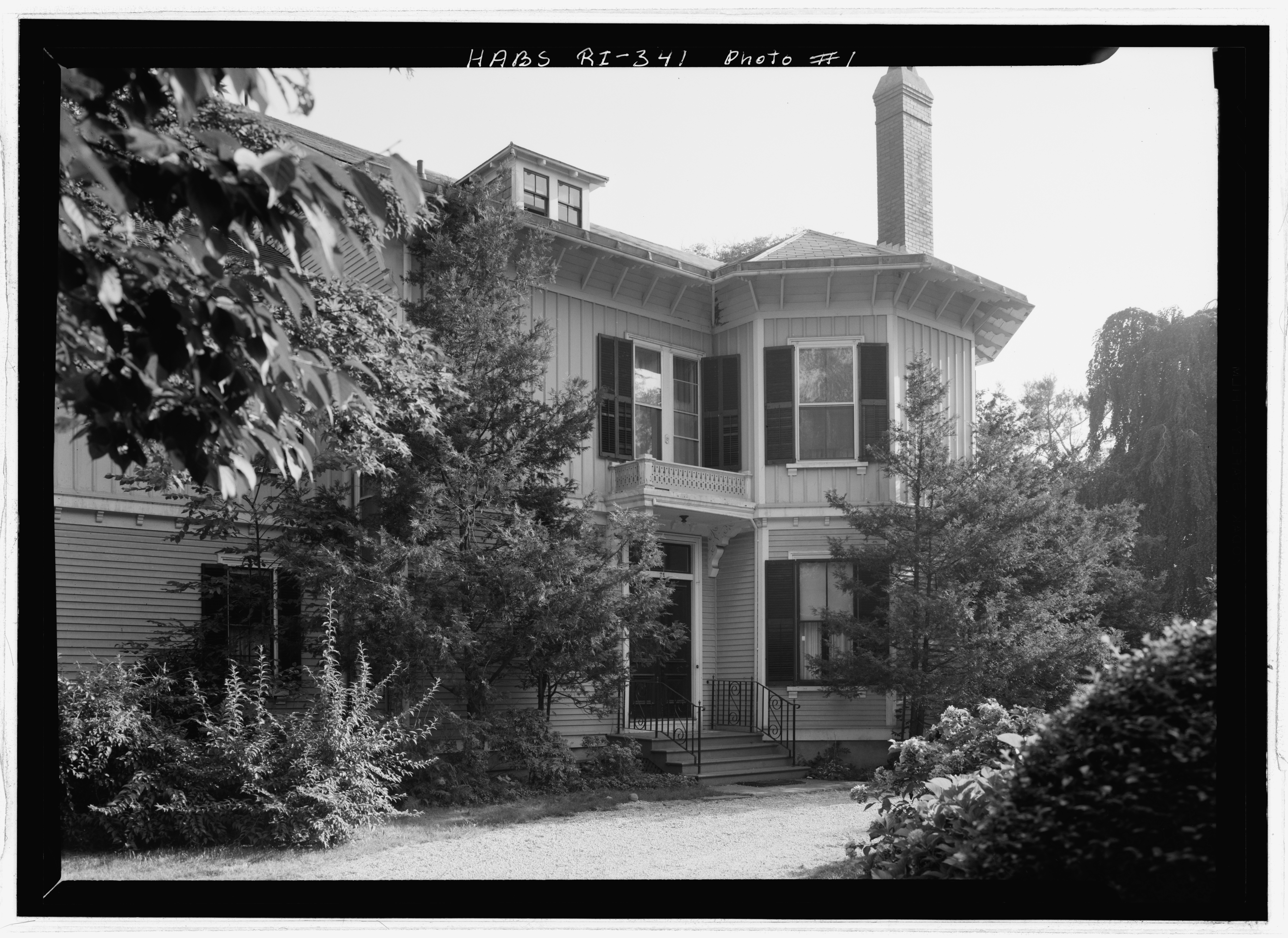
Side view of George Champlin Mason Sr.'s Newport house.

In 1851, Mason switched professions and became part owner and editor of the Newport Mercury newspaper. He often wrote about architectural subjects, and he worked with fellow citizens on developing the then-expanding plat of Newport. Beginning a few years later, he would occasionally write articles for the Providence Journal, the New York Evening Post, and other newspapers, sometimes using the pen names 'Aquidneck' and 'Champlin'. In 1854 he published Newport Illustrated, a guidebook that emphasizes the history of Newport buildings and places, and in 1884 he published a compendium of his occasional pieces under the title Reminiscences of Newport. Both were illustrated with black-and-white line drawings or engravings of Newport buildings, many of which are now long gone or substantially changed. Mason was also influential in the establishment of the Newport Historical Society (originally a branch of the Rhode Island Historical Society), and he was active in the Redwood Library and Athenaeum and other local organizations.

=== Solo practice ===
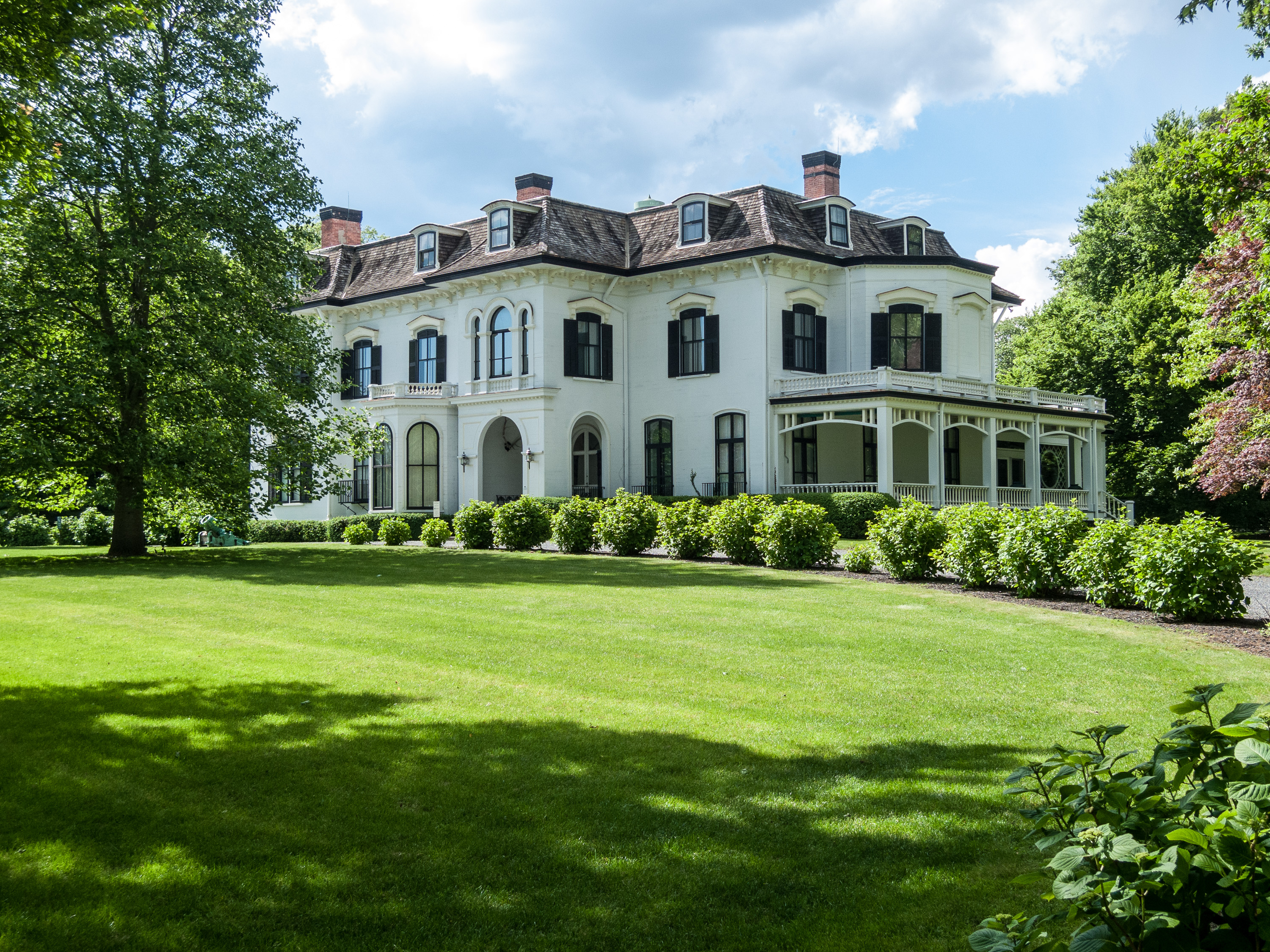
Chepstow Mansion

Around 1858, Mason resigned his editorship and began to study architecture in earnest. Two years later set himself up as an architect, opening the first professional architectural firm in Newport, where many of his 150 buildings are located. This was a period when Gilded Age New Yorkers of extreme wealth were building large summer homes in Newport, and Mason became a dominant architect of these residences in the 1860s. In 1860, Mason was commissioned to build the financier August Belmont's summer mansion "By-the-Sea". The commission came to him through Belmont's wife Caroline, who was a daughter of Commodore Matthew C. Perry, a relation of Mason's. "By-the-Sea" was an Italianate villa with many of the features that would become hallmarks of Mason's style: a formal, squarish building giving an impression of solidity; a modified French mansard roof; a three-bay entrance portico; and extensive use of bracketed trim. Mason's style owes something to that of the Providence architect Thomas Alexander Tefft, who died in 1859.

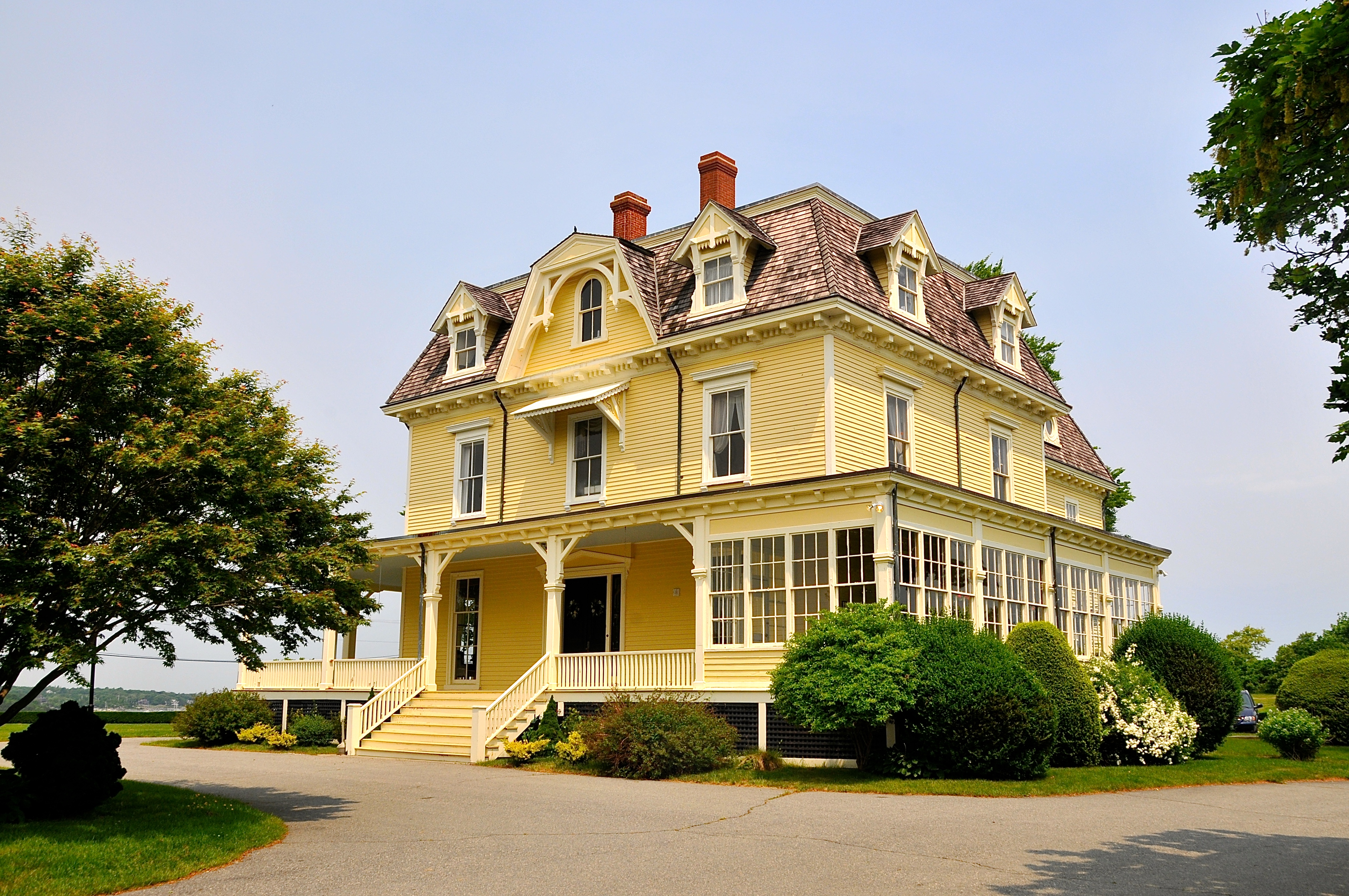
Eisenhower House

Also in 1860, Mason designed another large Italianate villa as a Newport summer home for Edmund Schermerhorn. Named "Chepstow", it was bequeathed with most of its furnishings intact to the Preservation Society of Newport County in 1986 and is now open to the public, one of a handful of buildings featured on the preservation society's website alongside more famous buildings like The Breakers. Chepstow includes features such as an interior staircase that pay deliberate homage to American pre-Revolutionary architecture, prefiguring the Colonial Revival period of the 1890s.

=== George C. Mason & Son ===
In 1867, Mason's son began working with him, and in 1871, he brought his son into partnership and renamed his firm George C. Mason & Son. In 1873, the firm designed the commanding officer's quarters (today known as the "Eisenhower House") at Fort Adams in Newport, which President Dwight D. Eisenhower used as his summer residence during his administration. "Woodbine Cottage," which Mason built for himself in 1873 in collaboration with his son, was a 23-room mansion in an ornate Swiss chalet style. Later named Chateau Sunnyside, it still is a private mansion until this day with many of its original features Mason became known for, but it now has an iconic three story Tower that has become synonymous with Newport. Like his slightly earlier "Edgewater" (1869–70), it features the elaborate kinds of wooden trim that increasingly crept into Mason's later work. Possibly the most stylistically adventurous of Mason's mature work is the "Loring Andrews House", which expresses the Modern Gothic style through facades that are almost completely covered in stick work.

Sometime between 1881 and 1891, Mason was elected as an honorary member New York Society of the Cincinnati. In 1891 Mason transferred to the Rhode Island Society of the Cincinnati. This was probably in recognition of his interest in preserving historical records and his family connection to Commodore Oliver Hazard Perry.

Mason died in 1894 in Philadelphia, Pennsylvania, and was buried in the Island Cemetery of Newport. He was inducted into the Rhode Island Heritage Hall of Fame in 2006.

Many of Mason's buildings have been demolished to make way for residential subdivisions; however, seven of his residences still stand along the north side of Narragansett Avenue in Newport.

== Partial list of buildings ==
- "Elm Court" (1853, for Boston merchant Andrew Robeson)
- "Cliffs" (1859, for Newport mayor Daniel B. Fearing; since demolished)
- "By-the-Sea" (1860, for August Belmont; demolished 1946)
- "F. Sheldon House" (ca. 1860? since demolished)
- "Chepstow" (1860–61, for Edmund Schermerhorn)
- "Henry Ledyard House" (1863–64)
- "Harbourview" (1865, for Ayres P. Merrill; demolished ca. 1950)
- "W. W. Tucker House" (1869; demolished 1938)
- "Edgewater" (for J. Frederick Kernochan, 1869–70; demolished 1888)
- "Loring Andrews House" (1871–72)
- "Eisenhower House" (1873)
- "Woodbine Cottage" (1873; also known as the "George Champlin Mason House"; now Chateau Sunnyside)

== Publications ==
- Newport and Its Environs, Illustrated by a Series of Views. Newport, R.I.: Chas. E. Hammett, 1848.
- Newport Illustrated in a Series of Pen & Pencil Sketches. New York: Appleton, 1854.
- Newport and Its Cottages. J. R. Osgood, 1875.
- The Old House Altered. New York: G.P. Putnam's, 1878.
- The Life and Works of Gilbert Stuart. New York: Scribner's, 1879.
- Reminiscences of Newport. Newport, R.I.: Charles E. Hammett, 1884.
- Annals of Trinity Church, Newport, Rhode Island 1698-1821. Philadelphia: Evans Printing, 1889.
