= USS Luce =

USS Luce may refer to various United States Navy ships named for Stephen B. Luce:

- USS Luce (DD-99), a Wickes-class destroyer launched in 1918 and scrapped in 1936
- USS Luce (DD-522), a Fletcher-class destroyer launched in 1943 and sunk during the Battle of Okinawa, 1945
- USS Luce (DDG-38), a Farragut-class guided missile destroyer launched in 1958 and scrapped in 2004

== See also ==
- USS Luce Bros. (SP-846), a patrol vessel in commission from 1917 to 1919
