= Naval War College Museum =

- Founders Hall
- U.S. National Historic Landmark District – Contributing property
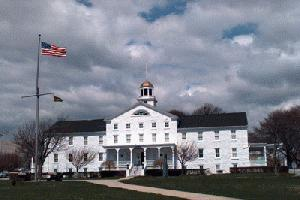

- Location within Rhode Island Location within the United States
- Location: Building 10; Luce Avenue; Naval Station Newport
- Coordinates: 41°30′24″N 71°19′44″W
- Built: 1884
- Architects: George C. Mason & Sons
- Part of: Naval War College (ID66000876)

Significant dates
- Added to NRHP: October 15, 1966
- Designated NHLDCP: January 29, 1964

The Naval War College Museum in Newport, Rhode Island, is one of 10 official American museums operated by the United States Navy, under the direction of the Naval History & Heritage Command and in co-operation with the Naval War College. It is located at Building 10, Luce Avenue, Naval Station Newport, in the building which first housed the Naval War College, a structure built in the early 19th century to house Newport's poor. It is a contributing element to a National Historic Landmark District, along with Luce Hall, the college's first purpose-built building.

== History ==
The Naval War College established the Naval Museum in 1952, with the approval of the Chief of Naval Operations to manage its collections of historical artifacts. It has occupied its present quarters on Coasters Harbor Island in Narragansett Bay since 1978. This building is now called Founders Hall and was built in 1819 as the Newport Poor Asylum. The city of Newport and the state of Rhode Island donated the property to the Navy for use as the Naval War College. College president Rear Admiral Stephen B. Luce formally dedicated the building to the Navy's use. It became famous between 1886 and 1889, when college president Captain Alfred Thayer Mahan gave lectures there which formed the basis for his famous book The Influence of Sea Power Upon History, 1660–1783 (1890).

Founders Hall and Luce Hall were designated a National Historic Landmark District in 1964, and were listed on the National Register of Historic Places in 1966.

== Museum ==
Today, the Naval War College Museum uses this building to display exhibits on the history of the Naval War College since 1884, the history of naval activities in the Narragansett Bay area since the colonial period, and the history of the art and science of naval warfare since ancient times. In 2015, the museum and its team of museum professionals were recognized as one of the ten best College museums in the United States.

== See also ==
- List of maritime museums in the United States
