= George Champlin Mason Jr. =

American architect (1849–1924)

- Born: August 8, 1849; Newport, Rhode Island
- Died: April 22, 1924 (aged 74); Ardmore, Pennsylvania
- Occupation: Architect
- Spouse: Sarah Borie
- Practice: George C. Mason & Son

George Champlin Mason Jr. (1849–1924) was an American architect who is considered the first professional architectural preservationist in the United States.

== Career ==
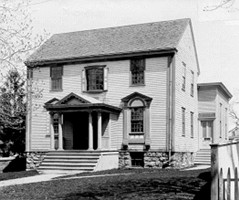
Sabbatarian Meeting House, built in 1729 in Newport, R.I., now part of the Newport Historical Society building complex.

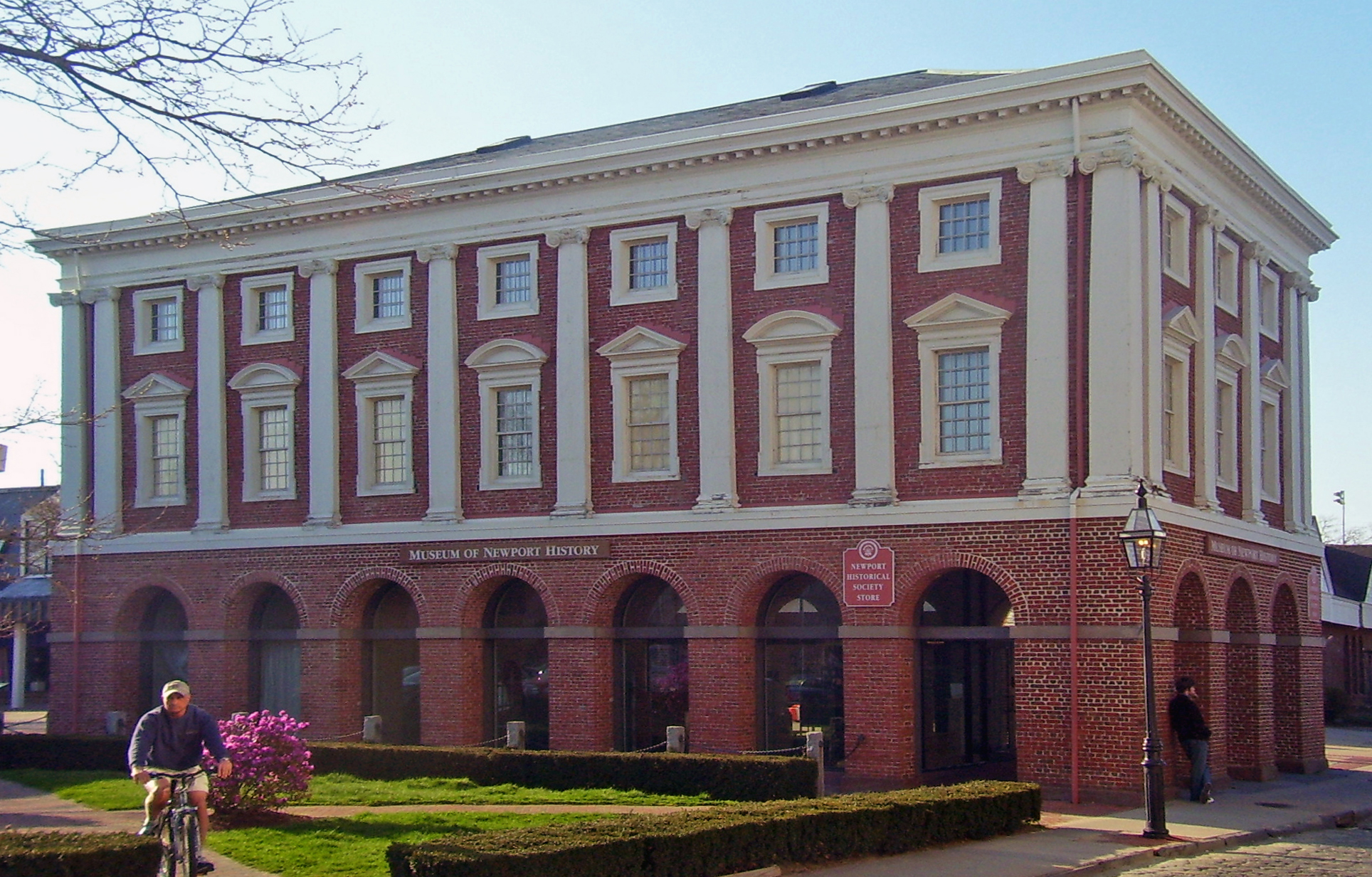
South profile and front elevation of the Old Brick Market, now the home of the Museum of Newport History.

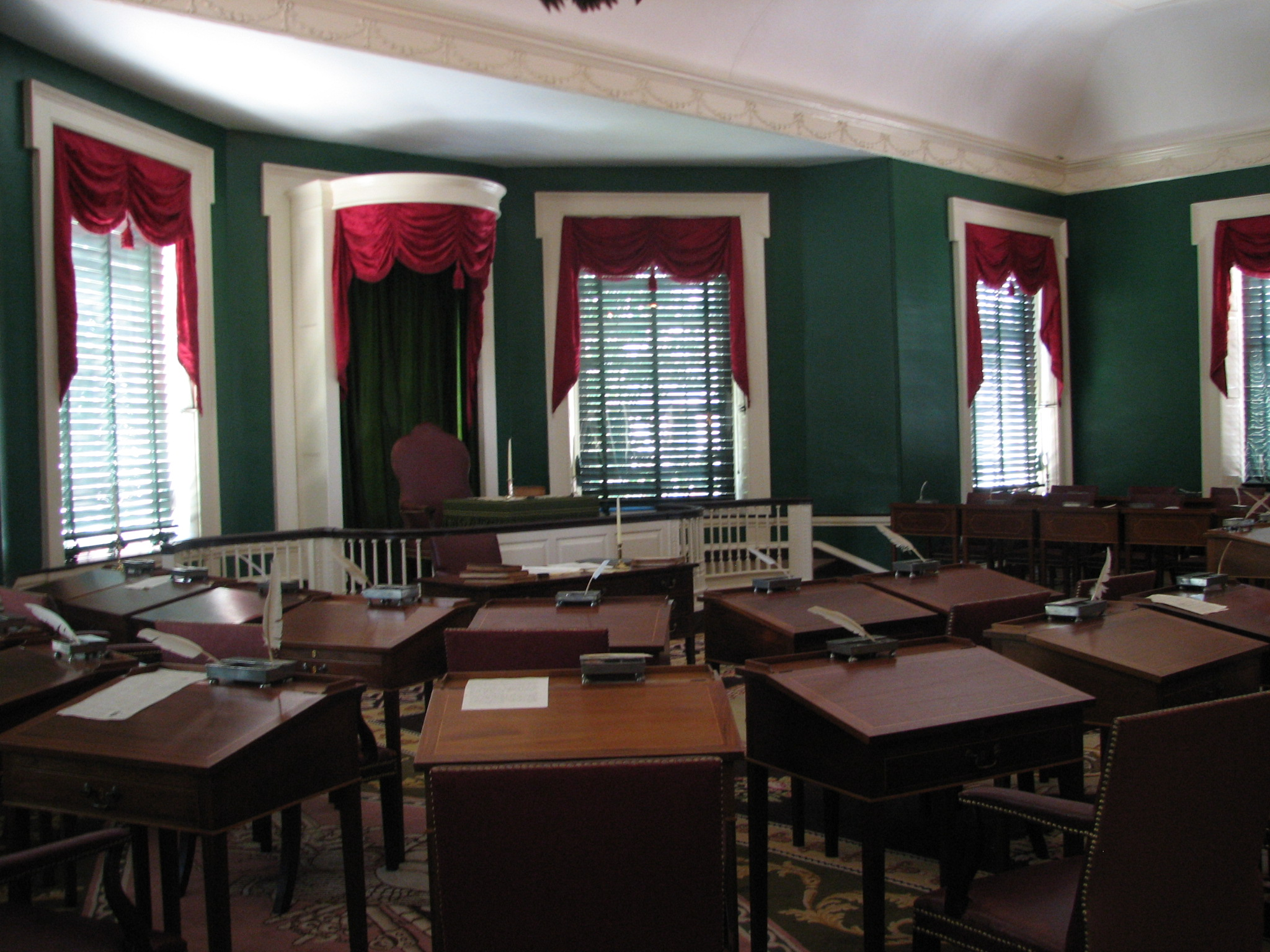
Senate chamber on the second floor of Congress Hall

George Champlin Mason Jr. was born in 1849 to Frances (Dean) and George Champlin Mason Sr. in Newport, Rhode Island. He was educated at the local Berkeley Institute and at the Oak Hill Military Academy in Yonkers, New York. His father was a well-known Newport architect, and Mason Jr. began working in his firm at the age of eighteen. Four years later, in 1871, his father made him a partner and renamed the firm George C. Mason & Son. He stayed in this partnership until his father's death in 1894.

Mason's earliest commission is thought to be the Thomas Cushing House in Newport, designed in 1869–1870 as an essay in the Stick style. Around the time he joined his father's firm, he designed the Frederick Sheldon house (since destroyed), which is considered by some historians to be the earliest Colonial Revival house in the United States. In the 1880s he designed the main building (now known as Luce Hall) of the Naval War College. In 1888, he moved to Philadelphia with his new wife, Sarah (Borie) Mason, and opened a branch of the firm there.

Mason became interested in American architectural history early in his career and wrote a number of articles on the subject. He became a fellow of the American Institute of Architects at the age of 25 and was one of the founders of the Rhode Island chapter, later becoming secretary of the Philadelphia chapter. He was made chairman of an AIA subcommittee that was set up to survey American colonial architecture with the goal of drawing attention to the work of early American architects. He wrote the committee's report, which was published in American Architect and Building News and illustrated with his own drawings. One major effect of this survey was to clearly distinguish between the American Colonial (including First Period and Colonial Georgian), the Federal, and the Colonial Revival building styles, ending the practice of considering these names as interchangeable terms for a single style. He used this forum to call for architects of the future to pay closer attention to the principles that had guided colonial architects and not just "find quaint details to copy in modern work and then unblushingly christen those works Queen Anne or Georgian."

With his strong interest in history, it is not surprising that after his father's death, Mason began to pursue commissions that involved historical preservation. Indeed, after 1895, it is thought that he did almost no original design work of the kind he had done while partnered with his father. His most extensive preservationist efforts were in Newport and Philadelphia. In Newport, he restored a monument to Admiral de Ternay at Trinity Episcopal Church in 1872, and in 1884 he restored the Sabbatarian Meeting House, which had been built in 1730 as a Seventh Day Baptist Church, installing tension rods to correct walls that had gone out of vertical alignment. He also encouraged the Newport Historical Society to buy the church for its headquarters, and it became the society's first headquarters and remains part of its complex today. He fought against a proposal to demolish the Old Brick Market, which had been built in 1760, on grounds of the quality of its design by the early American architect Peter Harrison. In this latter effort, he became one of the first architectural preservationists to argue from primarily aesthetic rather than purely historical grounds, and he has been called the first professional restoration architect in the United States. Thanks in part to Mason's efforts, Old Brick Market was saved and now houses the Museum of Newport History.

In 1895 to 1896, Mason restored the Senate Chamber in Congress Hall in Philadelphia, an initiative launched by The National Society of the Colonial Dames of America.

He died in Ardmore, Pennsylvania, in 1924. He is buried in the Laurel Hill Cemetery in Philadelphia.

== Selected publications ==
- "Colonial Architecture." American Architect and Building News, Aug. 20, 1881.
