= USS Luce (DD-99) =

Wickes-class destroyer

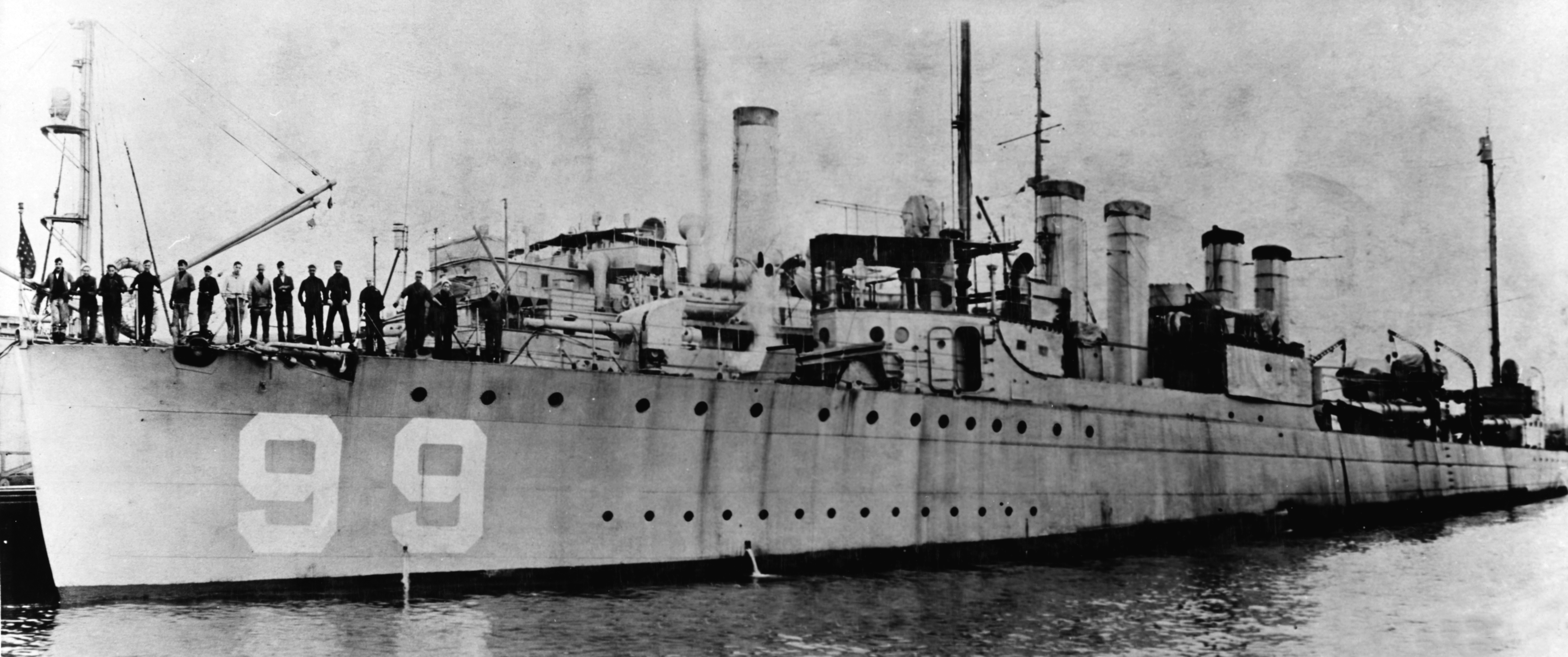
- USS Luce at the Boston Navy Yard, Charlestown, Massachusetts, on 28 November 1919

History

United States
- Name: Luce
- Namesake: Stephen B. Luce
- Builder: Fore River Shipyard, Quincy, Massachusetts
- Laid down: 9 February 1918
- Launched: 29 June 1918
- Commissioned: 11 September 1918
- Decommissioned: 30 June 1922
- Identification: DD-99
- Recommissioned: 19 March 1930
- Decommissioned: 31 January 1931
- Reclassified: 18 March 1920, DM-4
- Stricken: 7 January 1936
- Fate: Scrapped, 13 November 1936

General characteristics
- Class & type: Wickes-class destroyer
- Displacement: 1,191 tons
- Length: 314 ft 5 in (95.8 m)
- Beam: 31 ft 9 in (9.7 m)
- Draft: 9 ft 2 in (2.8 m)
- Speed: 35 knots (65 km/h; 40 mph)
- Complement: 133 officers and enlisted
- Armament: 4 × 4 in (102 mm) guns; 2 × 1-pounder guns; 12 × 21 in (533 mm) torpedo tubes

The first USS Luce (DD-99) was a Wickes-class destroyer in the United States Navy during World War I and the years following. She was named in honor of Stephen B. Luce.

== History ==
Luce was laid down by Fore River Shipbuilding Corporation at Quincy, Massachusetts, on 9 February 1918. The ship was launched on 29 June 1918, sponsored by Mrs. Boutelle Noyes, daughter of Rear Admiral Luce. The destroyer was commissioned on 11 September 1918.

Luce departed Boston on 19 September 1918 and reported to Commander Cruiser Force, Atlantic Fleet, in New York two days later. She sailed with Troop Convoy 67 for France on 23 September. Upon arrival at the Azores on 1 October, she was detached and proceeded to Gibraltar on 19 October. Luce performed escort and patrol duty in the Mediterranean Sea for the duration of the war.

On 26 November she departed for the Adriatic Sea and for five months patrolled the area in cooperation with the Food Commission. After voyaging to the eastern Mediterranean, Aegean, and Black Seas in May and June 1919, she returned to Gibraltar on 27 June en route to the United States. She arrived in New York on 10 July and proceeded to Boston for overhaul.

On 29 October she was transferred to Reserve Squadron 1, Atlantic Fleet, and 18 March 1920 was reclassified Light Mine Layer (DM-4). In April she departed Boston for Newport, Rhode Island, where she operated with the destroyer force until July. On 5 July 1921 she joined Mine Squadron 1 at Gloucester, Massachusetts, and participated in tactical exercises until October. After a cruise to the Caribbean Sea in January 1922, Luce arrived at Philadelphia where she decommissioned on 30 June 1922.

Luce recommissioned on 19 March 1930 and sailed to Panama on 18 April where she operated with submarines of the Canal Zone Control Force until May. She returned to the east coast on 4 June and trained with Mine Squadron 1 until steaming to Boston where she decommissioned for the final time on 31 January 1931. Luce was sold to Schiavone-Bonomo Corporation, New York on 29 September 1936 and scrapped 13 November 1936.
