= USS Luce (DDG-38) =

American Destroyer

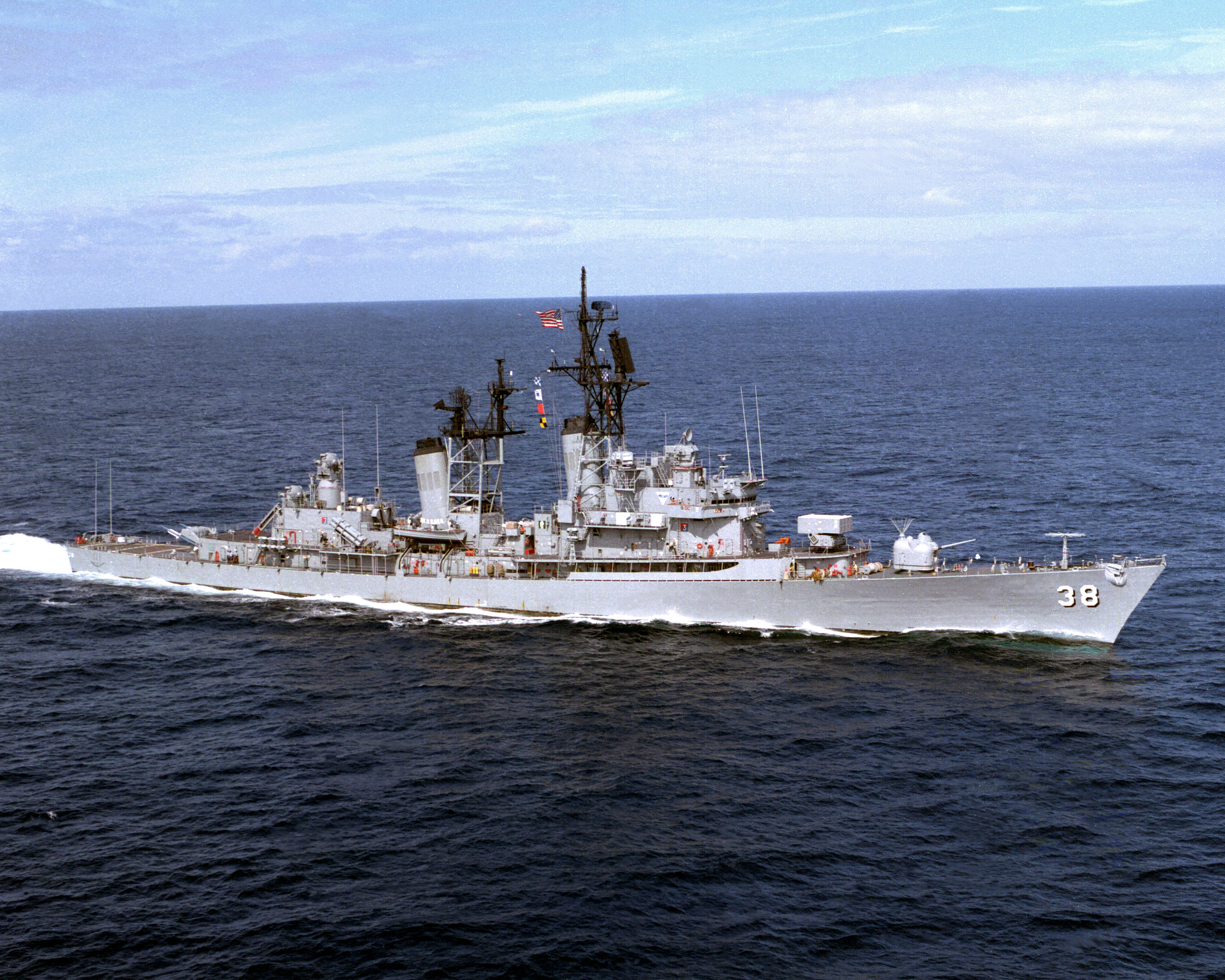
- USS Luce DDG-38

History

United States
- Name: Luce
- Namesake: Stephen B. Luce
- Builder: Bethlehem Steel Corporation, Fore River Shipyard
- Laid down: 1 October 1957
- Launched: 11 December 1958
- Commissioned: 20 May 1961
- Decommissioned: 1 April 1991
- Reclassified: DLG-7 14 November 1956 and DDG-38 30 June 1975
- Stricken: 20 November 1992
- Motto: "Pride, Power, Knowledge"
- Fate: Scrapped by Metro Machine, 17 June 2005 in Philadelphia, Pennsylvania

General characteristics
- Class & type: Farragut-class guided missile destroyer
- Displacement: 5,648 tons (full)
- Length: 512 ft 6 in (156.21 m)
- Beam: 52 ft 4 in (15.95 m)
- Draft: 17 ft 9 in (5.41 m) (max)
- Propulsion: 4 x 1,200psi boilers, 85,000 shp (63,000 kW); Geared turbines, 2 screws
- Speed: 33 knots (61 km/h; 38 mph)
- Range: 5,000 nautical miles (9,300 km; 5,800 mi) at 20 knots (37 km/h; 23 mph)
- Complement: 360
- Armament: 1 x 5 in (130 mm)/54 caliber Mk 42 gun; 2 x triple mounts of Mk 32 torpedo tubes for Mk 46 torpedoes; 1 x Mk 16 ASROC missile launcher; 1 x Mk 10 Mod 0 missile launcher for Standard Missile; 2 x Mk 141 Harpoon missile launchers

The third USS Luce (DLG-7/DDG-38) was Farragut-class guided missile destroyer of the United States Navy that served from 1962 until discarded in 1992. The ship was named for Rear Admiral Stephen B. Luce (1827–1917). Luce was sold for scrapping in 2005.

== History ==
Luce was laid down by the Bethlehem Steel Corporation at Quincy, Massachusetts, on 1 October 1957. The ship was launched on 11 December 1958, sponsored by the wife of Felix Stump, and commissioned on 20 May 1961 Commander David H. Bagley in command. USS Luce was reclassified as a guided missile destroyer on 30 June 1975 and designated DDG-38.

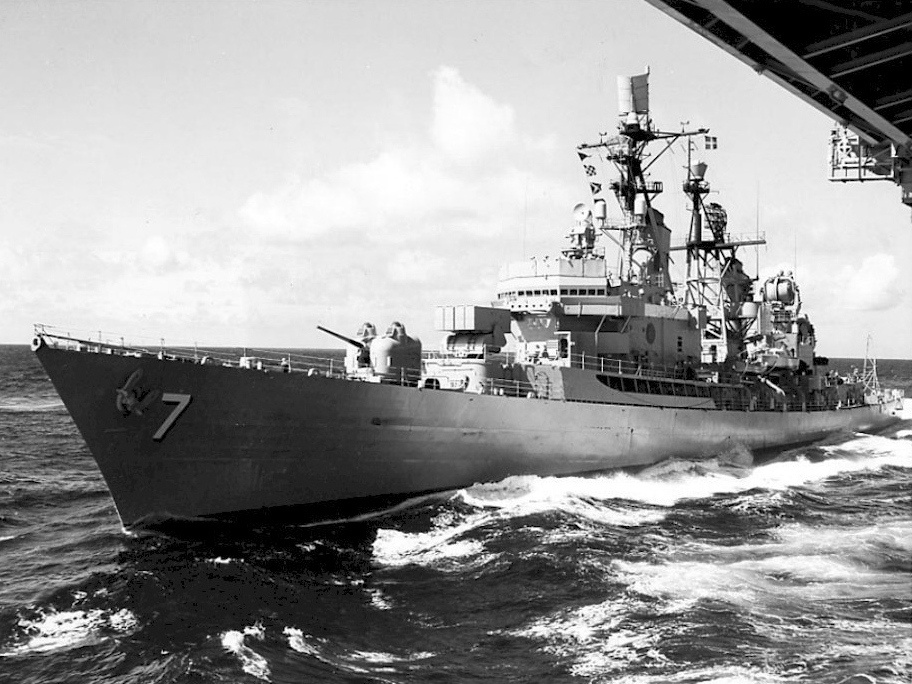
Luce in August 1962

Luce departed Mayport, Florida, on her shakedown cruise 14 February 1962. She spent the month of April with the U.S. 6th Fleet in her first task force operations, and returned home 11 May, where Capt. H. J. Ereckson, Commander of Destroyer Division 84, made her his flagship. She departed 3 August to rejoin the 6th Fleet, en route participating in NATO exercises Riptide III with units of the British and French navies. In the next 7 months she joined in three major NATO exercises before returning home 2 March 1963. During the spring and early summer, the guided missile destroyer conducted missile tests, trained midshipmen, and engaged in independent exercises along the Atlantic coast.

On 20 August 1963 she steamed to the Caribbean Sea for independent air, surface, and shore bombardment firings, and returned to Mayport 4 September. She joined Task Force 23 for intensive antisubmarine warfare (ASW) and anti-aircraft (AA) exercises 28 October, and after a short operation with the aircraft carrier USS Enterprise was back in Mayport for tender availability.

On 8 February 1964 she again joined the 6th Fleet, and was called upon to stand guard for 3 weeks near the unsettled island of Cyprus to evacuate American citizens if necessary. She hosted the Secretary of the Navy and Commander 6th Fleet 24 April for a missile firing demonstration, and then escorted the carrier USS Shangri-La on a high‑speed Atlantic crossing to Mayport, where she arrived 23 May.

In July the ship steamed to New York City to participate in operation "Sail" with a regatta of sailing craft from all over the world. She returned to Mayport after a 4-month overhaul 28 January 1965. The frigate had won both the Engineering and Battle Efficiency "E"s during 1964.

Luce returned to the Caribbean for intensive refresher training in March 1965. On 29 April she embarked a company of marines at Guantanamo Bay and proceeded to the troubled Dominican Republic 30 April. She patrolled the coast of the politically disturbed island until 8 May. She returned to the Mediterranean Sea in June for 4 months of operations with units of the Spanish, French, Greek, and Italian navies. In September she operated with the destroyer USS Corry in the Black Sea, and she returned to the Mediterranean late in 1965. She arrived Mayport 6 November and embarked Commander Destroyer Squadron 8. In December she engaged in missile firing and after a brief time in port in 1966 continued testing and improving missile techniques and carrying out the fleet's widespread peacekeeping activities which guard the free world.

On 19 January 1966 an "actual nuclear incident" occurred when the nuclear warhead on a Terrier anti-air missile separated from the missile and dropped about eight feet on the Luce while the ship was docked at Mayport Naval Station. It is recorded that "there were no personnel casualties, and aside from the dent in the warhead, no equipment was damaged."

On 13 June 1966 Luce got underway for deployment with the 6th Fleet in the Mediterranean. After participating in various exercises with United States and other allied ships, and representing the United States at two international trade fairs, she returned to Mayport on 26 October. The first half of 1967 saw Luce operating again in the Atlantic and Caribbean, and participating in a midshipmen training cruise in June. On 7 August, Luce began a regular overhaul at the U.S. Naval Shipyard, Charleston, South Carolina. She continued in overhaul until early 1968, then operated locally and in the Caribbean until departing Mayport 14 September for the Persian Gulf, sailing via Recife, Brazil, and various ports along the west and east coasts of Africa. She arrived at Bahrain 29 October and continued to stand watch over the troubled Middle East into 1969. Following Luce's return to Mayport in March 1969, the ship entered a stand-down period to prepare for the NTDS Modernization. In February 1970, Luce departed Mayport en route to Philadelphia Naval Shipyard. On 28 February 1970, Luce was decommissioned and underwent the NTDS Modernization at PNSY. During this period the two AN/SPQ-5A Missile Fire Control Radars were removed and replaced with an AN/SPS-48 Air Search Radar and two AN/SPG-55 Missile Fire Control Radars, respectively.

== Fate ==
Luce was decommissioned on 1 April 1991 at Naval Base Mayport, Florida, and stricken from the Navy list on 20 November 1992. On 16 December 1994, Luce was sold for scrapping and on 17 June 2005, the scrapping was completed.
