= Eisenhower House =

Historic house in Rhode Island, United States

- Commandant's Residence, Quarters Number One, Fort Adams
- U.S. National Register of Historic Places
- U.S. National Historic Landmark District – Contributing property
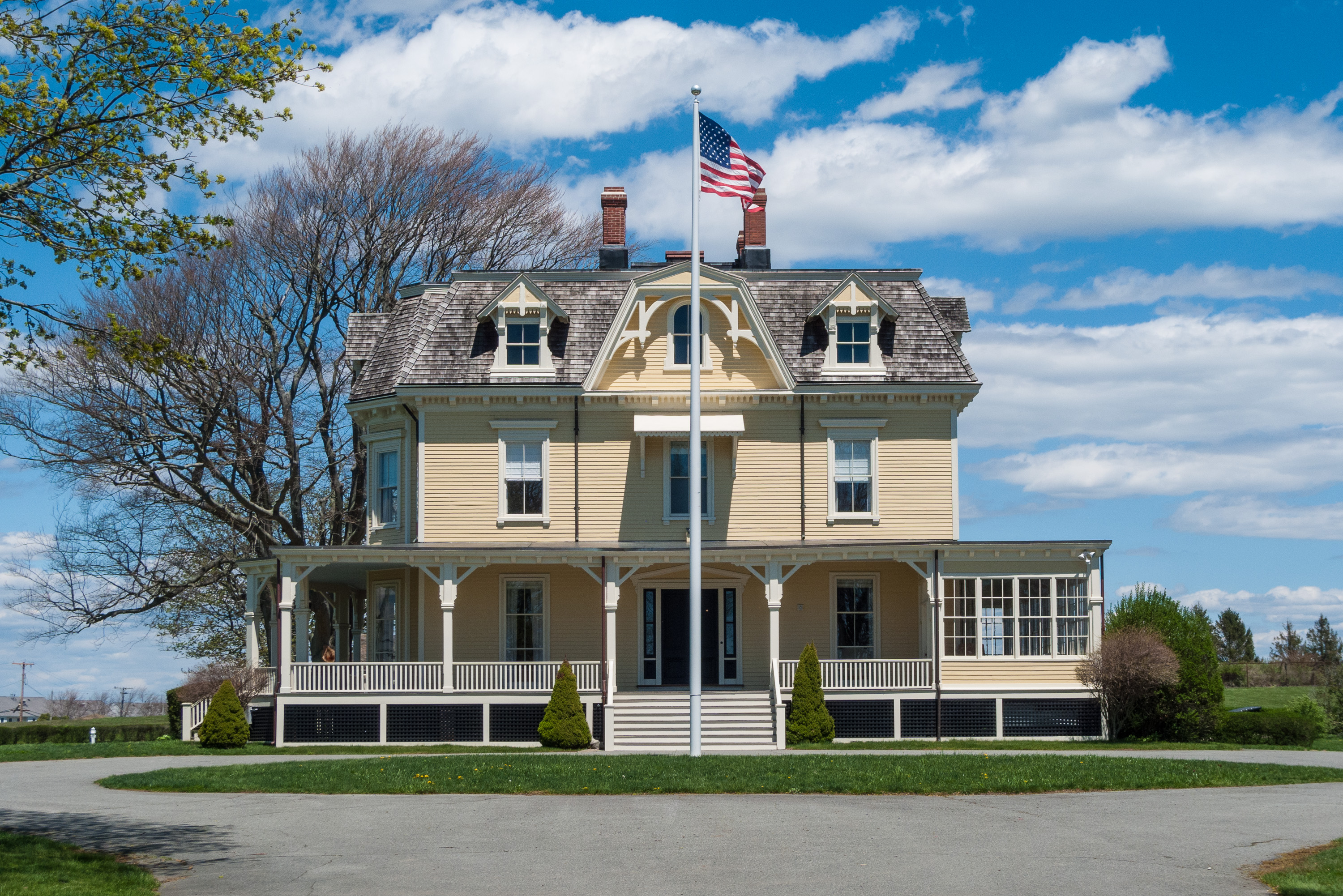
- The Eisenhower House in 2017
- Interactive map showing the house's location
- Location: Newport, Rhode Island
- Coordinates: 41°28′17″N 71°20′33″W
- Built: 1873
- Architect: George C. Mason & Son
- Architectural style: Victorian
- Part of: Fort Adams (ID70000014)
- NRHP reference No.: 74000043

Significant dates
- Added to NRHP: May 8, 1974
- Designated NHLDCP: July 28, 1970

Eisenhower House, formerly known as the Commandant's Residence or Quarters Number One of Fort Adams, is a historic house that is part of Fort Adams State Park in Newport, Rhode Island.

== History ==
The building was built by George C. Mason & Son in 1873. Its first inhabitant was General Henry Jackson Hunt. Dwight D. Eisenhower used the house as his summer residence during his presidency in 1958 and 1960. Initially, in 1958, the President was living at the Naval War College on Coasters Harbor Island. However, with his passion for golf, he moved to this location as it was close to the Newport Country Club. It then became the "Eisenhower House" and the Summer White House.

== Today ==
The Eisenhower House became part of Fort Adams State Park after the U.S. Navy transferred Fort Adams to the State of Rhode Island in 1964. The residence was added to the National Register of Historic Places in 1974. It is used for weddings and other social events.

== See also ==
- National Register of Historic Places listings in Newport County, Rhode Island
- List of residences of presidents of the United States
