= George C. Mason & Son =

American architectural firm

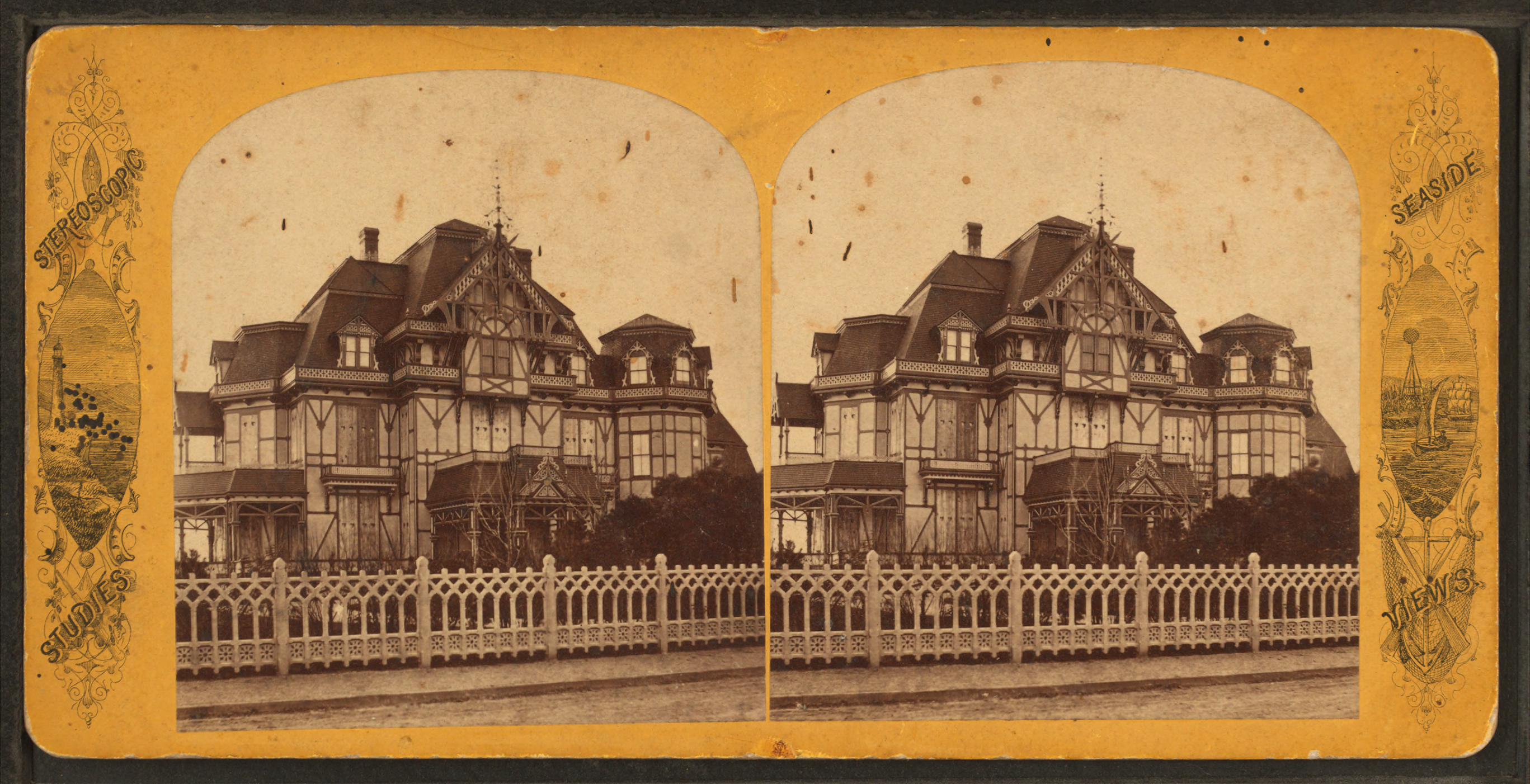
Loring Andrews House, Newport, 1871.

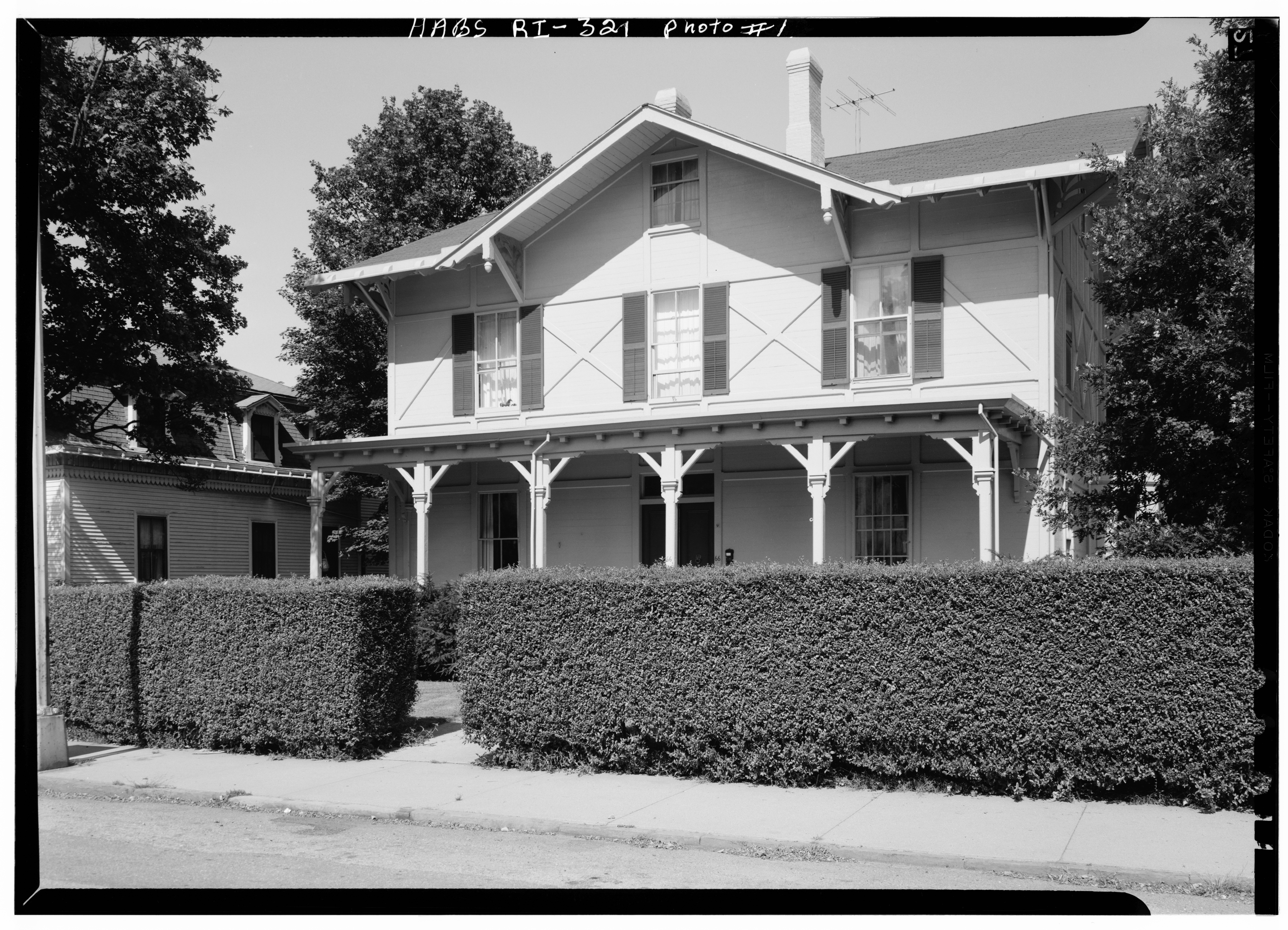
Isaac P. White House, Newport, 1872.

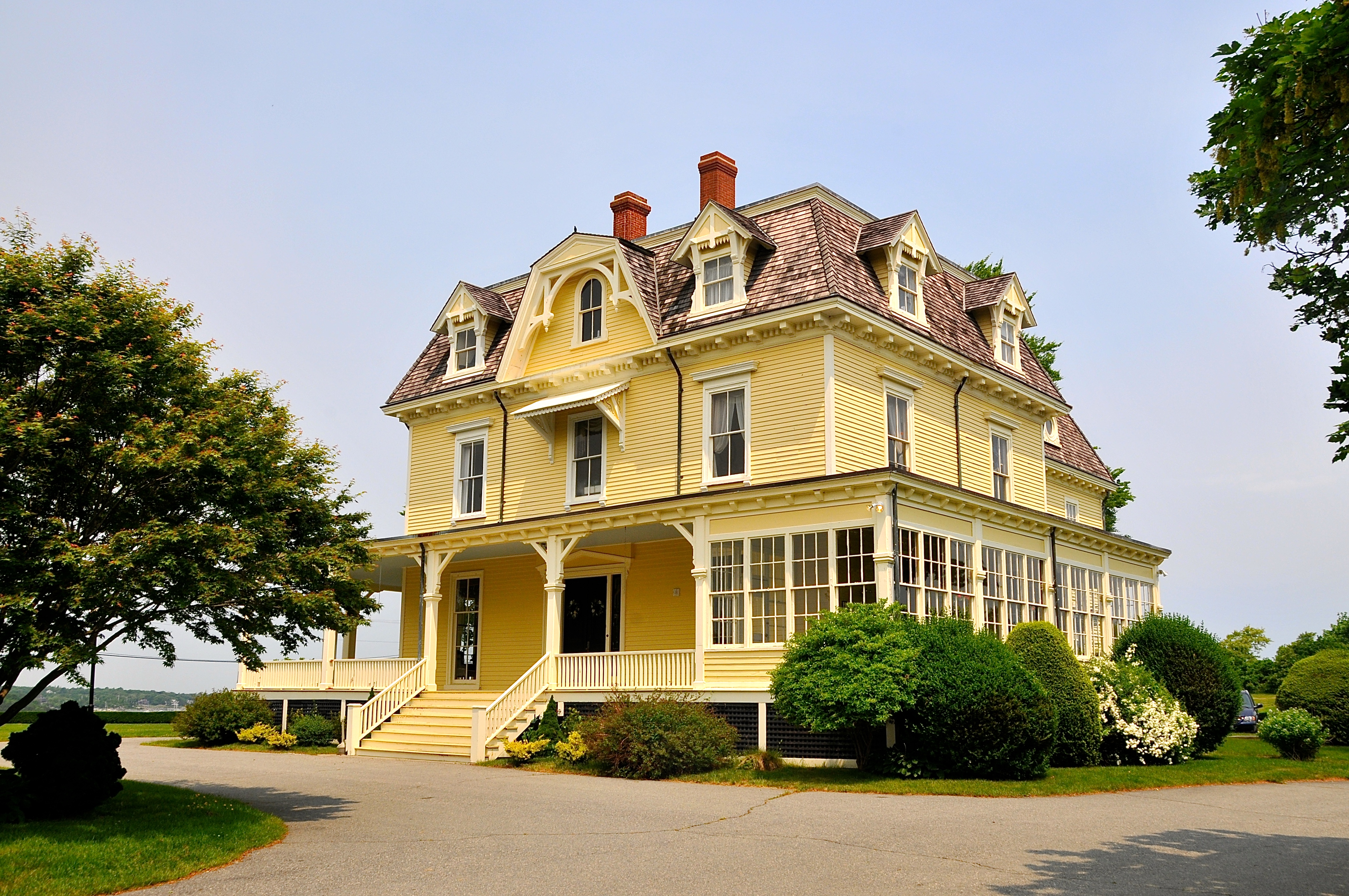
Commandant's House, Fort Adams, 1873.

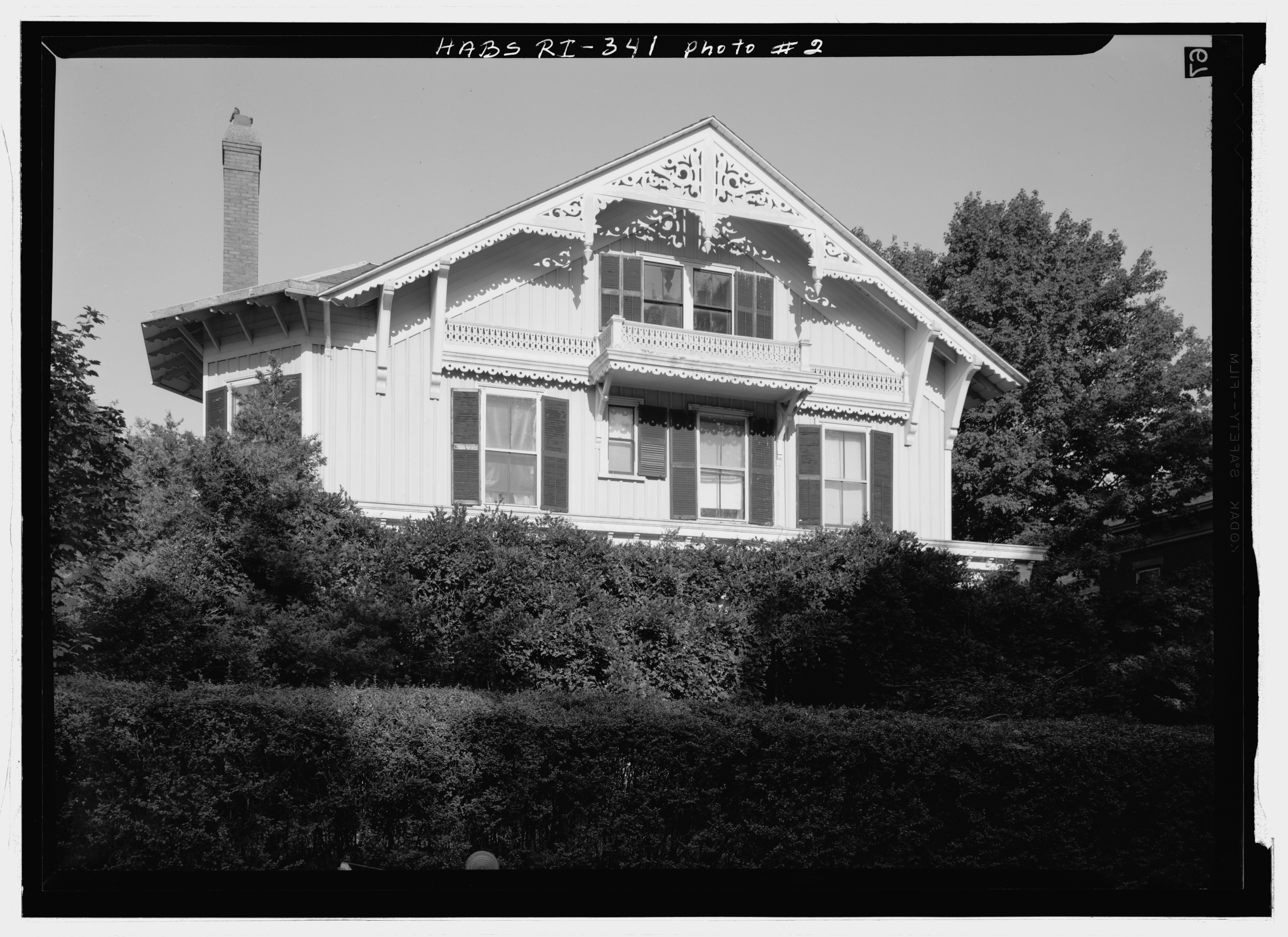
George C. Mason House, Newport, 1873.

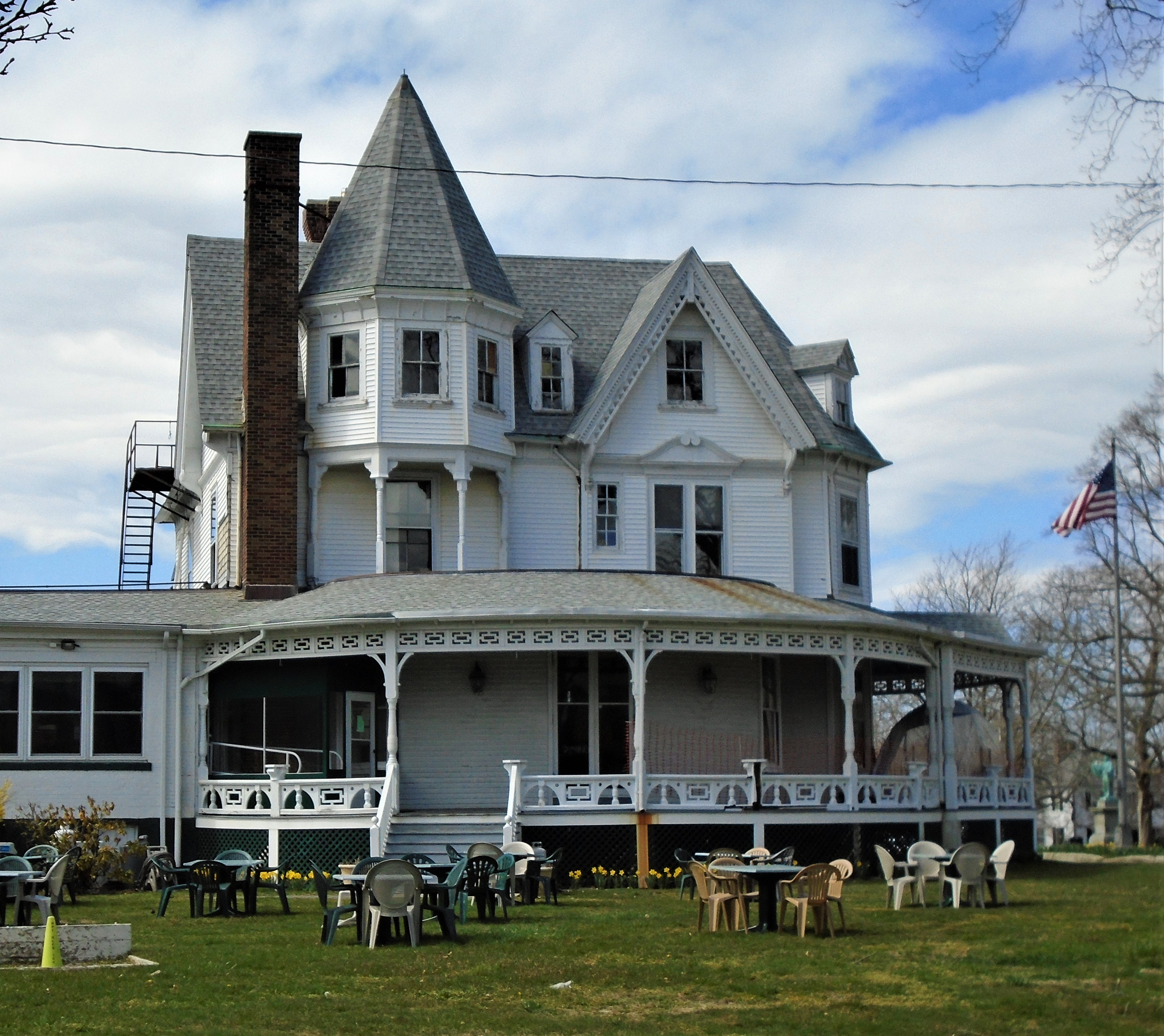
Parkgate, Newport, now Elks Lodge #104, 1881

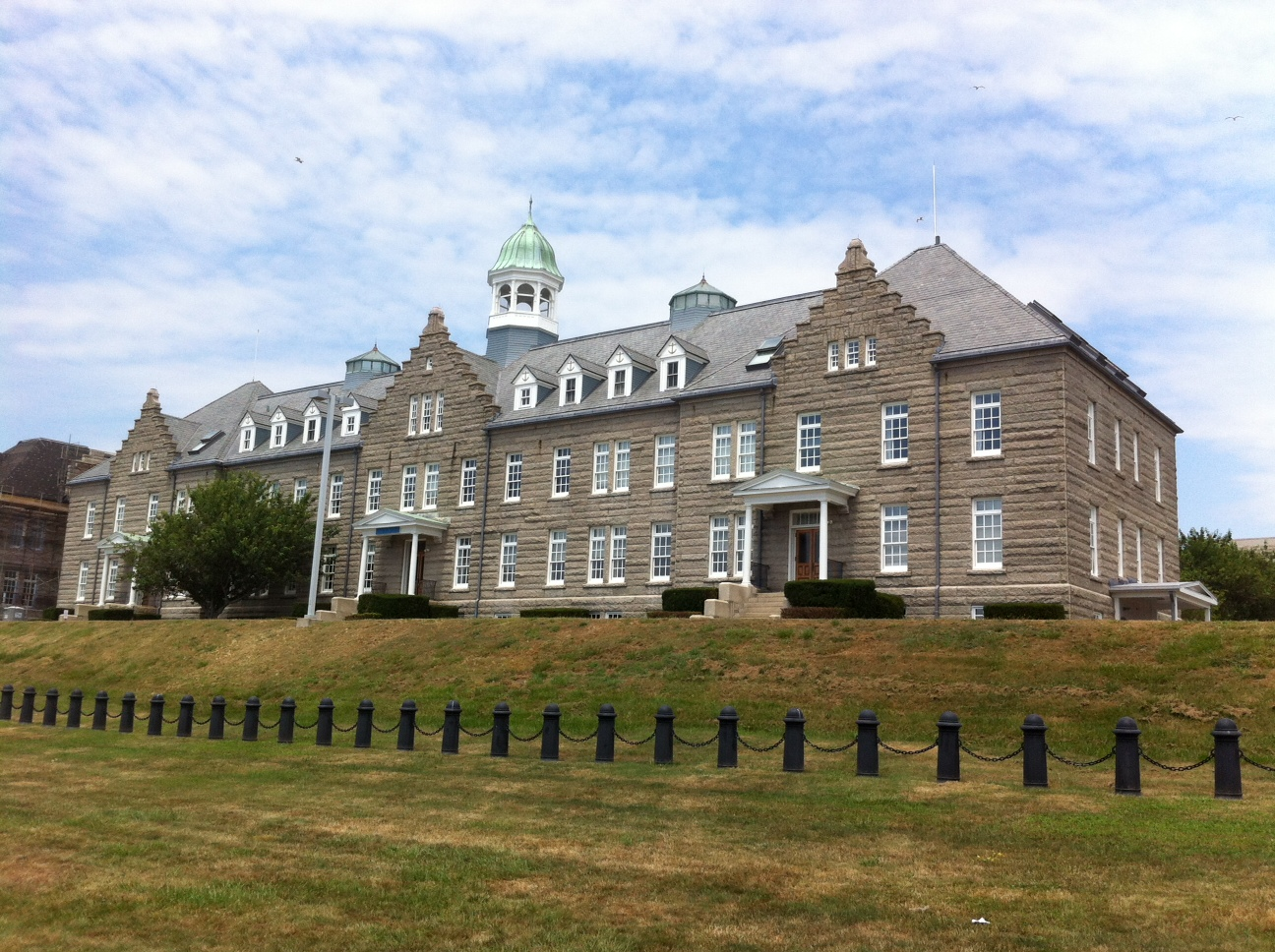
Luce Hall, Naval War College, 1891.

George C. Mason & Son (1871–94) was an American architectural firm in Newport, Rhode Island.

It was a father-son firm, the principals being George C. Mason (1820-1894) and George C. Mason Jr. (1849-1924). Mason established his office in 1860, and was the first true architect to work out of Newport. His son began working for him in 1867, and became a partner in January 1871. Mason Jr. married a Philadelphia woman in 1886, and opened a branch office of the firm in that city in 1888. The firm was dissolved with the elder Mason's death in 1894.

With the exception of the Philadelphia work, almost all of the Masons' known architectural work is in Newport County, Rhode Island. They were mainly noted for their residential designs for summer residents, though they also designed churches and civic structures of occasion.

== Architectural works ==
- Acorn House (Edward Cunningham Cottage), 1 Cottage St., Newport, RI (1871)
- Frederick Sheldon Cottage, Narragansett Ave. & Annandale Rd., Newport, RI (1871–72) - Demolished.
- Misses Hazard Cottage, 54 Kay St., Newport, RI (1871)
- Loring Andrews Cottage, 553 Bellevue Ave., Newport, RI (1871–72) - Replaced by Friedham in 1888, also by Mason & Son.
- Philip B. Case House, 60 Kay St., Newport, RI (1871)
- Maple Shade (John D. Ogden Cottage), 1 Red Cross Ave., Newport, RI (1871–72)
- Isaac P. White House, 66 Ayrault St., Newport, RI (1872)
- Heartseas (Charles N. Beach Cottage), 45 Ayrault St., Newport, RI (1873–74)
- Cliff Lawn (J. Winthrop Chanler Cottage), 117 Memorial Blvd., Newport, RI (1873) - Altered.
- Commandant's Residence, Fort Adams, Newport, RI (1873)
- Edward L. Brinley House, 6 Sunnyside Pl., Newport, RI (1873)
- Rogers High School, 95 Church St., Newport, RI (1873) - Built with a tower and mansard roof, both removed. No longer a school.
- Woodbine Cottage (George C. Mason House), 2 Sunnyside Pl., Newport, RI (1873–74)
- Redwood Library (Addition), 50 Bellevue Ave., Newport, RI (1874–75)
- John Howland House, 22 Old Walcott Ave., Jamestown, RI (1875) - Altered.
- Free Chapel of St. John the Evangelist, 61 Poplar St., Newport, RI (1875–76) - Now the parish house.
- White Gate (John B. Landers Cottage), 188 Narragansett Ave., Jamestown, RI (1875) - Altered by Hurricane Gloria.
- Cranston School, 15 Cranston Ave., Newport, RI (1876) - Demolished.
- Parkgate (Seth B. Stitt Cottage), 141 Pelham St., Newport, RI (1879) - For Seth B. Stitt. Now Elks Lodge #104.
- Mary Mitchell House, 13 Francis St., Newport, RI (1880)
- St. Matthew's Episcopal Church, 87 Narragansett Ave., Jamestown, RI (1880) - Demolished 1967.
- Charles Wheeler Cottage, 247 Eustis Ave., Newport, RI (1881)
- Francis Morris Cottage, 86 Rhode Island Ave., Newport, RI (1882–83)
- Graystone (Fitch J. Bosworth Cottage), Ochre Point & Victoria Aves., Newport, RI (1882–83) - Demolished.
- George C. Mason Jr. House, 5 Champlin St., Newport, RI (1883)
- Fire Station No. 4, 4 Equality Park Pl., Newport, RI (1884)
- St. George's Episcopal Church, 14 Rhode Island Ave., Newport, RI (1885–86)
- Belmont Memorial Chapel, Island Cemetery, Newport, RI (1886–88) - Overgrown, vacant and deteriorated.
- Chelten, Washington Ln., Abington, PA (1886) - Demolished.
- Swedish M. E. Church, 24 Annandale Rd., Newport, RI (1887)
- Friedham (Theodore Havemeyer Cottage), 553 Bellevue Ave., Newport, RI (1888) - Demolished 1906.
- Houses, 1017-1019 Spruce St., Philadelphia, PA (1888)
- Parish House for St. Stephen's Episcopal Church, 19 S. 10th St., Philadelphia, PA (1888)
- Addison C. Thomas House, 96 Rhode Island Ave., Newport, RI (1889–90)
- Stone Gables (Sarah T. Z. Jackson Cottage), 100 Rhode Island Ave., Newport, RI (1889–90)
- Luce Hall, Naval War College, Newport, RI (1891–92)

Mason & Son also submitted designs in the architectural competition for the new Rhode Island State House in 1890. Their entry did not make it past the first round.
