= Coasters Harbor Island =

Island in Newport County, Rhode Island, United States

Coordinates: 41°30′33.65″N 71°19′38.19″W

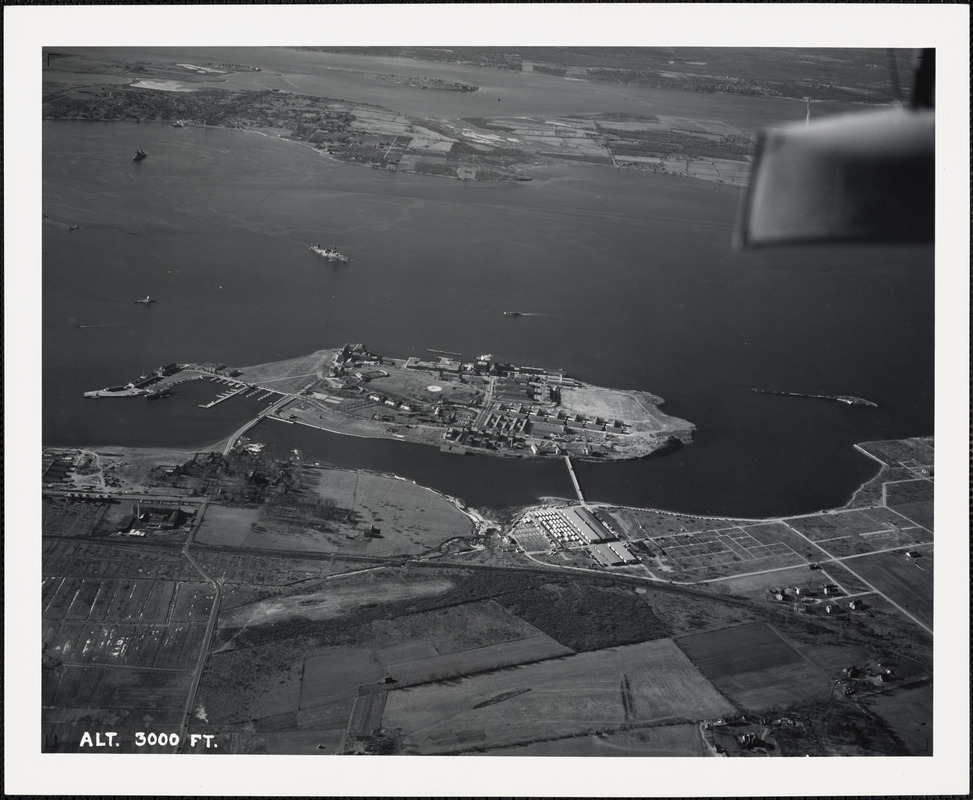
Aerial photograph of Coasters Harbor Island, 1941

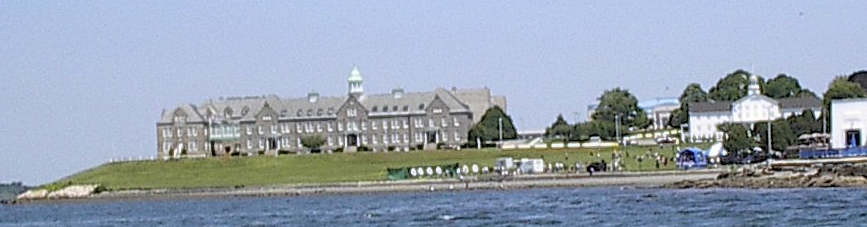
The Naval War College. The original Newport Asylum building can be seen on the far right, now housing the Naval War College Museum. The larger building on the left is Luce Hall.

Coasters Harbor Island is a 92-acre (370,000 m^{2}) island in Narragansett Bay, Newport, Rhode Island. The island is home to the Naval War College (NWC), an education and research institution of the United States Navy that specializes in developing ideas for naval warfare and passing them along to officers of the Navy.

== History ==
The island was originally known as Weenachasett. On April 30, 1639, Nicholas Easton and his two sons, Peter and John named the island "Coasters’ Harbour" or "Coasters Harbor" after spending a night on the island while travelling by boat from Portsmouth. In 1654 Rhode Island settlers purchased Coasters Island from the Narragansetts. In 1822 the town of Newport built the Newport Asylum for the Poor on the island, and the Newport Poor House and Farm was located there until the State of Rhode Island donated the island to the U.S. Navy in 1882. The Navy still uses it as a training center, and it is home to the Naval War College and Naval War College Museum.
