= Luce Hall =

- U.S. National Register of Historic Places
- U.S. National Historic Landmark District – Contributing property
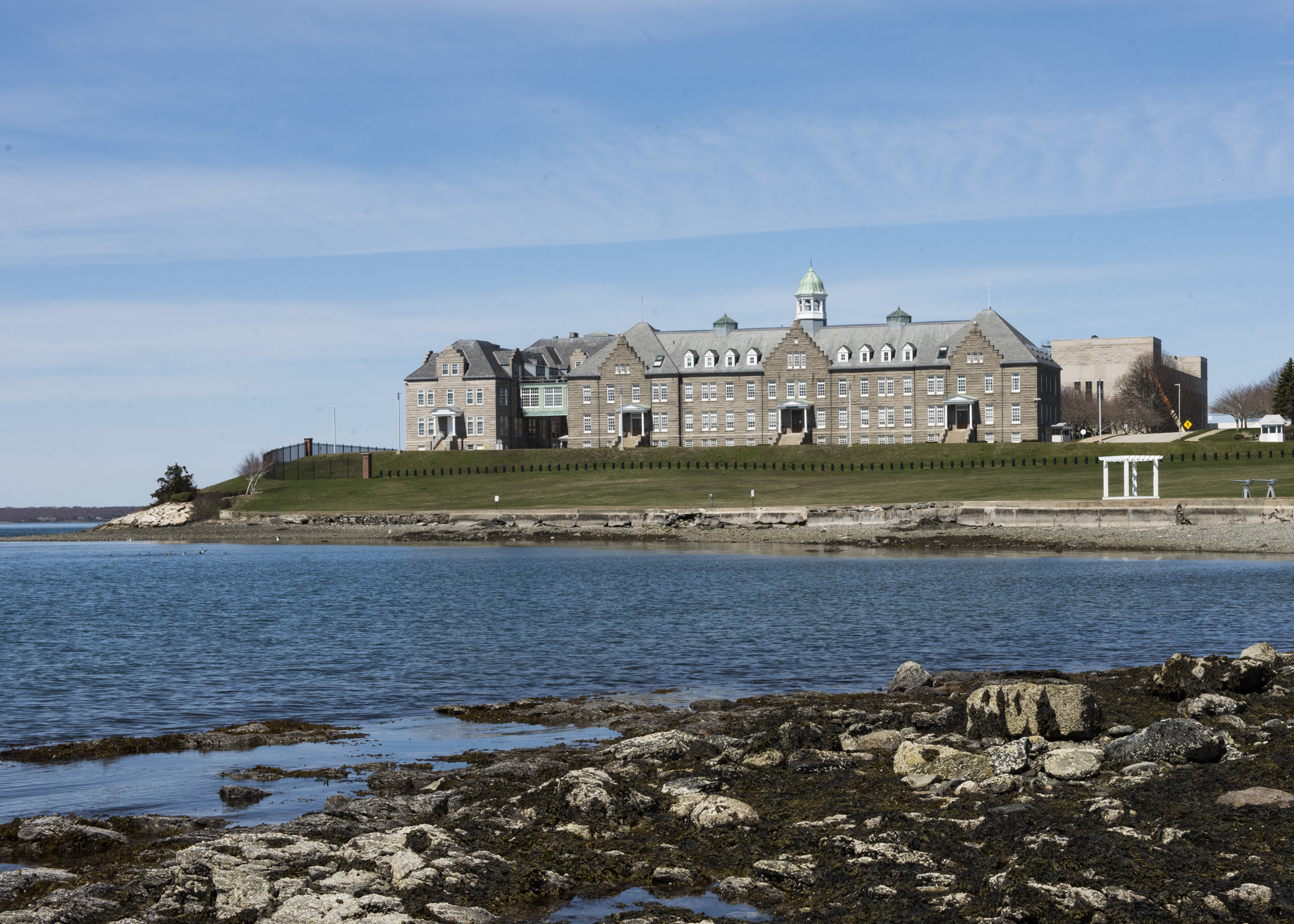

- Location within Rhode Island Location within the United States
- Location: Building 1 Luce Avenue; Naval Station Newport
- Coordinates: 41°30′24″N 71°19′44″W
- Area: less than one acre
- Built: 1890
- Architect: George C. Mason & Son
- Part of: Original US Naval War College (ID66000876)
- NRHP reference No.: 72001439

Significant dates
- Added to NRHP: September 22, 1972
- Designated NHLDCP: January 29, 1964

Luce Hall was the first purpose-built building for the U.S. Naval War College, founded at Newport, Rhode Island, in 1884. It is located at Building 1, Luce Avenue, Naval Station Newport. The building is named after Rear Admiral Stephen Luce.

In a Flemish style inspired by the town hall and guild halls on the Grote Markt in Antwerp, Belgium, local Newport architects George C. Mason & Son designed the building for the Navy with gables facing Narragansett Bay. It was completed on 22 May 1892 at the cost of $82,875, with the remainder of the $100,000 Congressional appropriation being spent on heating and equipment. The building was originally designed to have four sets of officers' quarters, one in each corner of the building, with the College classrooms, library, and administration located in the center section. This usage remained until 1914, when the entire building was opened for official uses.

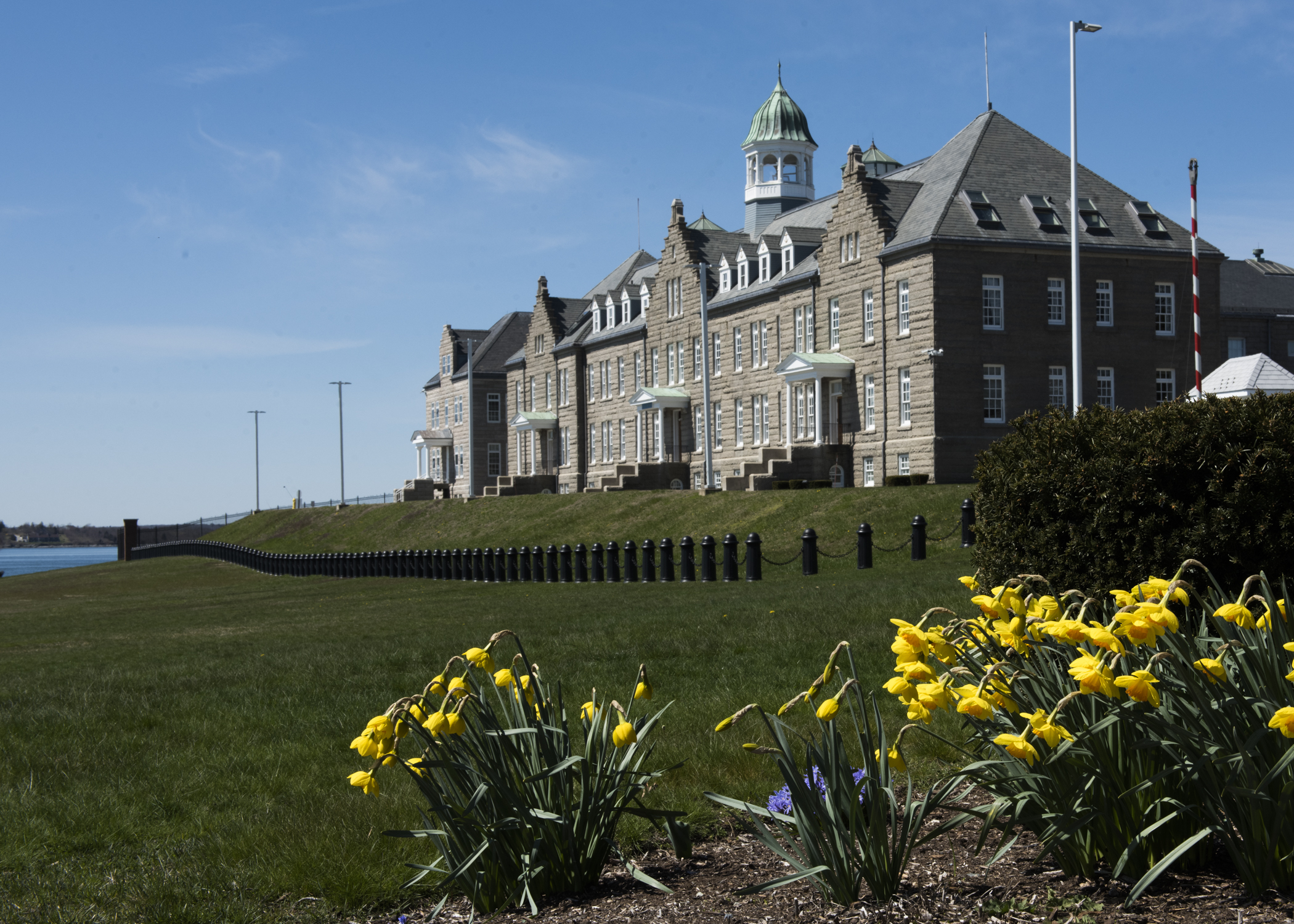
The building in 2020

The building was the main administrative building for the Naval War College from 1892, when Captain Alfred Thayer Mahan was President of the Naval War College for his second time, until 1974 during the presidency of Vice Admiral Stansfield Turner, when the president's office was moved to newly constructed Conolly Hall.

The building was designated part of a National Historic Landmark District, along with the building that is now the Naval War College Museum (which housed the college's first facilities but was built in 1819 to house Newport's poor), in 1964. It was separately listed on the National Register of Historic Places in 1972.

== See also ==
- National Register of Historic Places listings in Newport County, Rhode Island
