= Stephen Luce =

United States Navy admiral (1827–1917)

Stephen Bleecker Luce
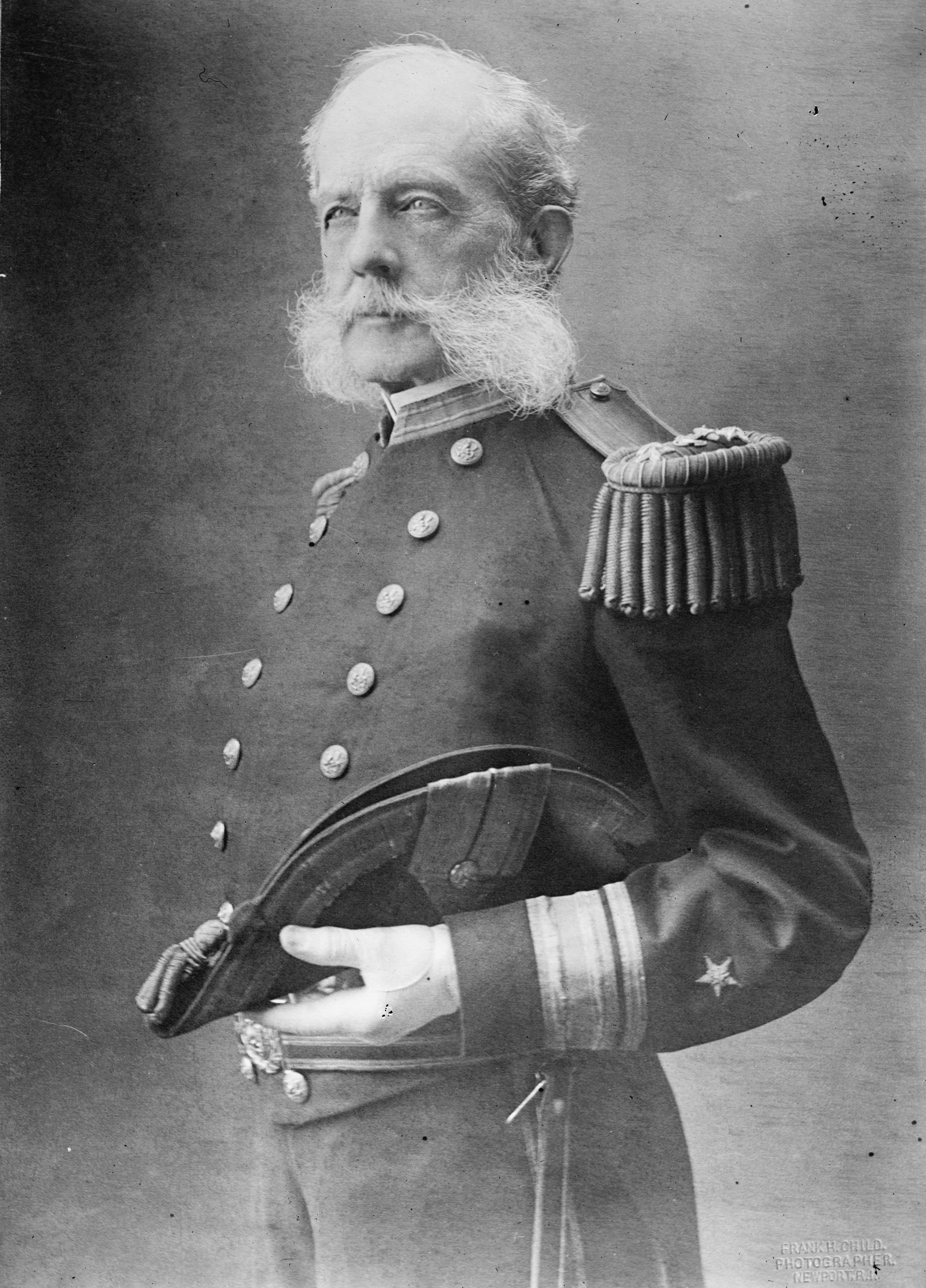
- Born: March 25, 1827; Albany, New York, U.S.
- Died: July 28, 1917 (aged 90); Newport, Rhode Island, U.S.
- Burial place: St. Mary's Episcopal Church, Portsmouth, Rhode Island, U.S.
- Military career
- Allegiance: United States
- Branch: United States Navy
- Service years: 1841–1889
- Rank: Rear admiral
- Commands: USS Nantucket; Training Squadron Newport; North Atlantic Squadron; Naval War College
- Conflicts: Mexican–American War; American Civil War

Stephen Bleecker Luce (March 25, 1827 – July 28, 1917) was an admiral in the United States Navy. Regarded as one of the Navy's outstanding officers in many fields, including strategy, seamanship, education, and professional development, he founded and served as the first president of the Naval War College in Newport, Rhode Island. He also co-founded and later served as president of the United States Naval Institute in Annapolis, Maryland.

== Early years and personal life ==
Born in Albany, New York, to Dr. Vinal Luce and Charlotte Bleecker, Luce entered the Navy on October 19, 1841, at the age of 14. He was instructed at the Naval School in Philadelphia until 1845, when the United States Naval Academy opened in Annapolis. He graduated from the Academy in 1848 and was warranted as a passed midshipman to date from August 10, 1847. He was promoted to lieutenant on September 15, 1855.

In 1854, Luce married Elizabeth Henley, a grand-niece of Martha Dandridge Custis Washington, wife of George Washington. Their children included daughter Caroline (1857–1933), who became the wife of Montgomery M. Macomb, later a brigadier general in the United States Army.

=== American Civil War ===
Luce served with the Atlantic Ocean / East Coast blockade squadron during the American Civil War (1861-1865), and commanded the ironclad monitor Nantucket at the siege of Charleston, South Carolina. He was promoted to lieutenant commander in 1862. He was assigned to the U.S. Naval Academy, which was moved to Newport, Rhode Island, from January 1862 to October 1863. In 1862, while serving as head of the Department of Seamanship, he prepared one of the first seamanship textbooks. During the war, he also commanded the naval vessels USS Sonoma, USS Canadaigua, and USS Pontiac.

He was promoted to full commander in 1866.

=== Post-Civil War ===
After the Civil War, Luce organized the Navy's apprentice training program to prepare naval seamen and petty officers for fleet duty. From 1869 to 1872, he commanded the sloop-of-war USS Juniata which was assigned to the Mediterranean Sea Fleet. He was promoted to captain in December 1872 and served as the captain of the yard at the Boston Navy Yard (at Charlestown, Massachusetts, across the Charles River from Boston), until 1875. He commanded the USS Hartford from November 1875 to August 1877. From August to December 1877, Luce was the Navy's inspector of training ships, then from January 1878 to February 1881, he commanded the training ship USS Minnesota.

From July to September 1884, Luce commanded the North Atlantic Squadron with the USS Tennessee as his flagship. From June 1886 to February 1889, Luce again commanded the North Atlantic Squadron with the USS Richmond this time as his flagship.

Luce helped start the United States Naval Institute in October 1873; he would serve as the Institute's president from 1887 to 1898.

==== Newport ====
In 1881, Luce was promoted to commodore, and commanded the U.S. Navy Training Squadron in Newport from April 1881 to June 1884.

While in command of the Training Squadron, Luce developed and implemented the apprentice training program—the first formal program for training American enlisted sailors. Luce's plan was to have bright and healthy young men, 14 to 17 years old, serve an apprenticeship with the Training Squadron during which they received an academic education and hands-on seamanship training.

The "boys" were typically enlisted around 14 or 15 and typically served in the Navy until age 21, when they could choose to be discharged or extend their service in the Navy. Previously, the Navy had taken recruits with no prior experience; all training of enlisted sailors was "on the job". Many recruits lacked the discipline and skills necessary to be useful. The program ended in 1904 when the Navy was rapidly expanding and could not wait several months for new recruits to be trained.

Based on Luce's urgings and exhaustive reports, the Naval War College at Newport, Rhode Island, was established on October 6, 1884. Luce served as its first president. In 1885, he was promoted to rear admiral, and the next year handed off the presidency to Captain Alfred Thayer Mahan.

=== Retirement ===
The wooden-hulled, steam-powered sloop-of-war Richmond, was Luce's last assignment at sea. Having reached the mandatory retirement age of 62, he retired from the Navy on March 25, 1889.

In 1892 he was appointed Commissioner General of the U.S. Commission for the Historical American Exposition held in Madrid, Spain to mark the four hundredth year of the Discovery of America.

Luce returned to the War College in 1901 and served for nearly a further decade as a faculty member. He retired in November 1910 at the age of 83.

== Affiliations ==
Luce belonged to several military societies. In 1894, Luce joined the Aztec Club of 1847, a military society of U.S. Army and Navy officers who had served during the Mexican-American War of 1846-1848, and served as its vice president from 1909 until 1910 and as its president from 1910 to 1911.

He joined the Pennsylvania Commandery of the Military Order of Foreign Wars (MOFW) in 1896 and became the founding commander of the Rhode Island Commandery of the MOFW in 1900. On February 6, 1901 he was elected as a veteran companion for the first class of the New York Commandery of the Military Order of the Loyal Legion of the United States (MOLLUS). He was assigned New York MOLLUS companion number 1324 and national MOLLUS insignia number 13113. He was also a member of the Naval Order of the United States.

In 1901, he was elected to the board of directors of the Redwood Library in Newport.

An active member of the Protestant Episcopal Church, Luce served as a vestryman of two Newport churches: All Saints Memorial Chapel and St. John's Episcopal Church, where he also served as a warden.

== Death and burial ==
Luce died on July 28, 1917 and was buried in St. Mary's Episcopal Churchyard in Portsmouth, Rhode Island.

== Publications ==
In 1863, David Van Nostrand published Luce's textbook Seamanship, intended for use at the Naval Academy. A later edition appeared in 1905.

In December 1891, The North American Review published Luce's paper "The Benefits of War".

Luce also edited The Patriotic and Naval Songster (1883).

== Dates of rank ==
Reference – U.S. Navy Register, 1899. p. 70.

- Midshipman – October 19, 1841
- Passed Midshipman – August 10, 1847 (Note: Some sources state 10 August 1848.)
- Lieutenant – September 16, 1855 (Note: Some sources state 15 September 1855.)
- Lieutenant Commander – July 16, 1862
- Commander – July 25, 1866
- Captain – December 28, 1872
- Commodore – November 25, 1881
- Rear Admiral – October 5, 1885
- Retired list – March 25, 1889
- Retired on active duty – February 13, 1901
- Final retirement – November 1910

== Awards ==
- Civil War Campaign Medal
- Spanish Campaign Medal

== Legacy ==
Three warships have been named USS Luce in his honor.

The Naval Academy and the Naval War College have buildings named Luce Hall in his honor.

The auditorium at the erstwhile Naval Training Center, constructed in 1941 in San Diego, California, was named for Luce. The library at the State University of New York Maritime College in the borough of The Bronx, New York City, is the Stephen B. Luce Library.

There is a memorial stained-glass window at the St. John's Episcopal Church in Newport in Luce's honor.

There is a descriptive historical plaque in honor of Luce at the corner of Kay Street and Rhode Island Avenue in Newport.

Military offices
Preceded by George H. Cooper	Commander-in-Chief, North Atlantic Squadron; 26 June 1884 – 20 September 1884	Succeeded by James E. Jouett
Preceded by none	President of the Naval War College; 1884–1886	Succeeded by Alfred Thayer Mahan
Preceded by James E. Jouett	Commander-in-Chief, North Atlantic Squadron; 18 June 1886 – 28 January 1889	Succeeded by Bancroft Gherardi
